= Dayton Literary Peace Prize =

American literary award

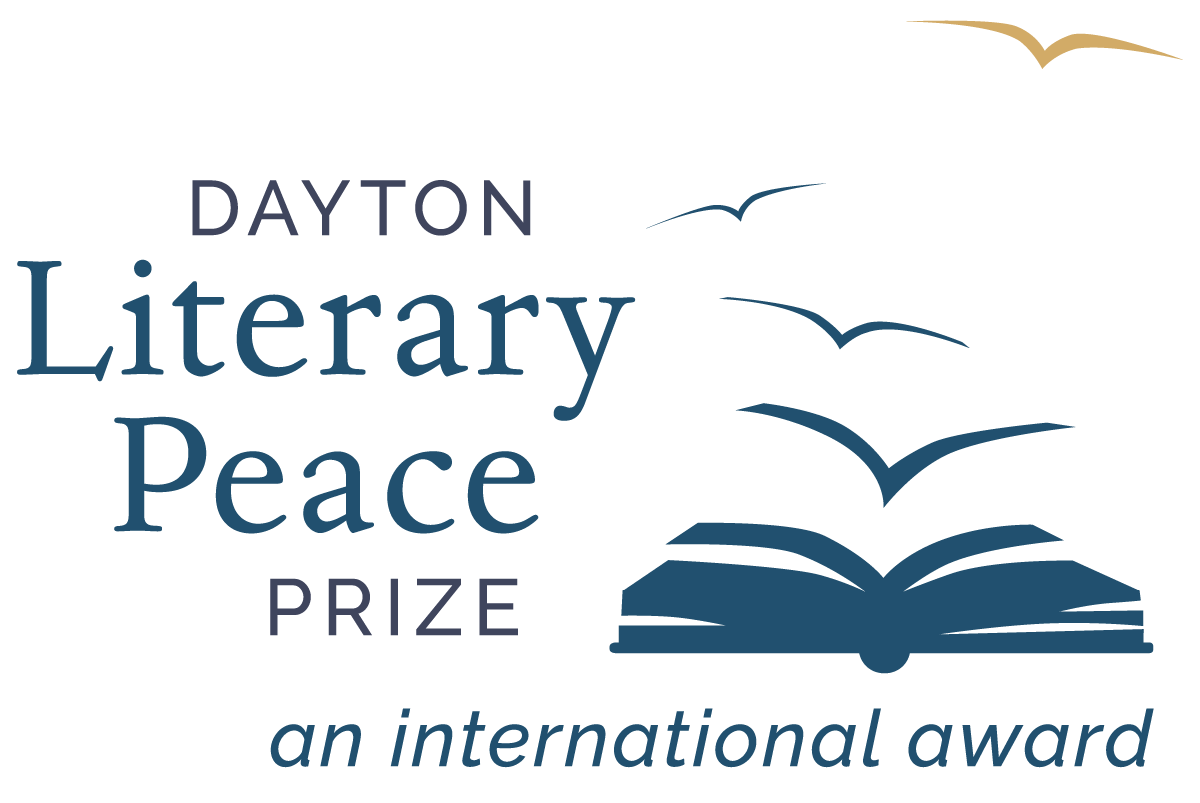
- The Dayton Literary Peace Prize logo
- Country: United States
- Status: Active
- First award: 2006
- Website: https://www.daytonliterarypeaceprize.org

The Dayton Literary Peace Prize is an annual United States literary award "recognizing the power of the written word to promote peace" that was first awarded in 2006. Awards are given for adult fiction and non-fiction books published at some point within the immediate past year that have led readers to a better understanding of other peoples, cultures, religions, and political views, with the winner in each category receiving a cash prize of $10,000. The award is an offshoot of the Dayton Peace Prize, which grew out of the 1995 peace accords ending the Bosnian War. In 2011, the former "Lifetime Achievement Award" was renamed the Richard C. Holbrooke Distinguished Achievement Award with a $10,000 honorarium.

In 2008, Martin Luther King Jr. biographer Taylor Branch joined Studs Terkel and Elie Wiesel as a recipient of the Dayton Literary Peace Prize's Lifetime Achievement Award, which was presented to him special guest Edwin C. Moses. The 2008 ceremony was held in Dayton, Ohio, on September 28, 2008. Nick Clooney, who hosted the ceremony in 2007, again served as the evening's host in 2008 and 2009.

The 2009 ceremony was held in Dayton, Ohio, on November 8, 2009, at which married authors and journalists Nicholas Kristof and Sheryl WuDunn received the Dayton Literary Peace Prize's 2009 Lifetime Achievement Award.

The Dayton Literary Peace Prize is recognized as "the first and only U.S. literary award recognizing the power of the written word to promote peace." The foundation's goal is to reward writers "whose work uses the power of the written word to foster peace, social justice, and global understanding."

In addition to the $10,000 cash prize for the Fiction and Nonfiction winners, the runners-up in both categories also receive a $5,000 cash prize. Furthermore, the winners of the three main categories receive a unique Michael Bashaw sculpture as part of their award package.

Recent recipients of the Ambassador Richard C. Holbrooke Distinguished Achievement Award (the lifetime honor) include Salman Rushdie (2025). The most recent Fiction winner is Sam Wachman (2026) for The Sunflower Boys and the most recent Nonfiction winner is Kevin Sack (2026) for Mother Emanuel.

== Recipients ==
=== Fiction ===
Year	Author	Title	Result	Ref.
2006	Francine Prose	A Changed Man	Winner	
2006	Kevin Haworth	The Discontinuity of Small Things	Runner-up	
2007	Brad Kessler	Birds in Fall	Winner	
2007	Lisa Fugard	Skinner's Drift	Runner-up	
2008	Junot Díaz	The Brief Wondrous Life of Oscar Wao	Winner	
2008	Daniel Alarcón	Lost City Radio	Runner-up	
2009	Richard Bausch	Peace	Winner	
2009	Uwem Akpan	Say You're One of Them	Runner-up	
2009	Louise Erdrich	The Plague of Doves	Finalist	
2009	Ma Jian	Beijing Coma	Finalist	
2009	Rachel Kushner	Telex from Cuba	Finalist	
2009	James McBride	Song Yet Sung	Finalist	
2010	Marlon James	The Book of Night Women	Winner	
2010	Chimamanda Ngozi Adichie	The Thing Around Your Neck	Runner-up	
2010	Lucy Beckett	A Postcard from the Volcano	Finalist	
2010	Ha Jin	A Good Fall	Finalist	
2010	Eugenia Kim	The Calligrapher's Daughter	Finalist	
2010	Abraham Verghese	Cutting for Stone	Finalist	
2011	Chang-rae Lee	The Surrendered	Winner	
2011	Maaza Mengiste	Beneath the Lion's Gaze	Runner-up	
2011	Dinaw Mengestu	How to Read the Air	Finalist	
2011	Mark Mustian	The Gendarme	Finalist	
2011	Teddy Wayne	Kapitoil	Finalist	
2012	Andrew Krivak	The Sojourn	Winner	
2012	Ha Jin	Nanjing Requiem	Runner-up	
2012	Leah Hager Cohen	The Grief of Others	Finalist	
2012	Michael Ondaatje	The Cat's Table	Finalist	
2012	Ismet Prcic	Shards	Finalist	
2012	Jesmyn Ward	Salvage the Bones	Finalist	
2013	Adam Johnson	The Orphan Master's Son	Winner	
2013	Ben Fountain	Billy Lynn's Long Halftime Walk	Runner-up	
2013	Louise Erdrich	The Round House	Finalist	
2013	Susanna Moore	The Life of Objects	Finalist	
2013	Robert Olmstead	The Coldest Night	Finalist	
2013	Kevin Powers	The Yellow Birds	Finalist	
2014	Bob Shacochis	The Woman Who Lost Her Soul	Winner	
2014	Margaret Wrinkle	Wash	Runner-up	
2014	Anthony Marra	A Constellation of Vital Phenomena	Finalist	
2014	Alice McDermott	Someone	Finalist	
2014	Antonio Muñoz Molina with Edith Grossman	In the Night of Time	Finalist	
2014	P.S. Duffy	The Cartographer of No Man's Land	Finalist	
2015	Josh Weil	The Great Glass Sea	Winner	
2015	Anthony Doerr	All the Light We Cannot See	Runner-up	
2015	Roxane Gay	An Untamed State	Finalist	
2015	Cristina Henriquez	The Book of Unknown Americans	Finalist	
2015	Jacqueline Winspear	The Care and Management of Lies	Finalist	
2015	Tiphanie Yanique	Land of Love and Drowning	Finalist	
2016	Viet Thanh Nguyen	The Sympathizer	Winner	
2016	James Hannaham	Delicious Foods	Runner-up	
2016	Elliot Ackerman	Green on Blue	Finalist	
2016	Matt Gallagher	Youngblood	Finalist	
2016	Aline Ohanesian	Orhan's Inheritance	Finalist	
2016	Hanya Yanagihara	A Little Life	Finalist	
2017	Patricia Engel	The Veins of the Ocean	Winner	
2017	Yaa Gyasi	Homegoing	Runner-up	
2017	Robert Olen Butler	Perfume River	Finalist	
2017	Peter Ho Davies	The Fortunes	Finalist	
2017	Annie Proulx	Barkskins	Finalist	
2017	Colson Whitehead	The Underground Railroad	Finalist	
2018	Hala Alyan	Salt Houses	Winner	
2018	Min Jin Lee	Pachinko	Runner-up	
2018	Jenny Erpenbeck	Go, Went, Gone	Finalist	
2018	Mohsin Hamid	Exit West	Finalist	
2018	Jaroslav Kalfař	Spaceman of Bohemia	Finalist	
2018	Jesmyn Ward	Sing, Unburied, Sing	Finalist	
2019	Golnaz Hashemzadeh Bonde	What We Owe	Winner	
2019	Richard Powers	The Overstory	Runner-up	
2019	Gina Apostol	Insurrecto	Finalist	
2019	Mary Lynn Bracht	White Chrysanthemum	Finalist	
2019	Tommy Orange	There There	Finalist	
2019	Moriel Rothman Zecher	Sadness Is a White Bird	Finalist	
2020	Alice Hoffman	The World That We Knew	Winner	
2020	Christy Lefteri	The Beekeeper of Aleppo	Runner-up	
2020	Valeria Luiselli	Lost Children Archive	Finalist	
2020	Maurice Carlos Ruffin	We Cast a Shadow	Finalist	
2020	Elif Shafak	10 Minutes, 38 Seconds	Finalist	
2020	Colson Whitehead	The Nickel Boys	Finalist	
2021	Alexander Starritt	We Germans	Winner	
2021	Nguyễn Phan Quế Mai	The Mountains Sing	Runner-up	
2021	Louise Erdrich	The Night Watchman	Finalist	
2021	James McBride	Deacon King Kong	Finalist	
2021	Douglas Stuart	Shuggie Bain	Finalist	
2021	Elizabeth Wetmore	Valentine	Finalist	
2022	Honorée Fanonne Jeffers	The Love Songs of W.E.B. Du Bois	Winner	
2022	JoAnne Tompkins	What Comes After	Runner-up	
2022	Anthony Doerr	Cloud Cuckoo Land	Finalist	
2022	Patricia Engel	Infinite Country	Finalist	
2022	Brad Kessler	North	Finalist	
2022	Juhea Kim	Beasts of a Little Land	Finalist	
2023	Geraldine Brooks	Horse	Winner	
2023	Lily Brooks-Dalton	The Light Pirate	Runner-up	
2023	James Hannaham	Didn't Nobody Give a Shit What Happened to Carlotta	Finalist	
2023	Noah Hawley	Anthem	Finalist	
2023	Susan Straight	Mecca	Finalist	
2023	Vauhini Vara	The Immortal King Rao	Finalist	
2024	Paul Lynch	Prophet Song	Winner	
2024	Anne Berest	The Postcard	Runner-up	
2024	Nguyễn Phan Quế Mai	Dust Child	Finalist	
2024	Janika Oza	A History of Burning	Finalist	
2024	Eleanor Shearer	River Sing Me Home	Finalist	
2024	Erum Shazia Hasan	We Meant Well	Finalist	
2025
2025	Kaveh Akbar	Martyr!	Winner	
2025	Priscilla Morris	Black Butterflies	Runner-up	
2025	Helen Benedict	The Good Deed	Finalist	
2025	Percival Everett	James	Finalist	
2025	Kristin Hannah	The Women	Finalist	
2025	Alejandro Puyana	Freedom is a Feast	Finalist	
2026
2026	Sam Wachman	The Sunflower Boys	Winner	
2026	Charlotte McConaghy	Wild Dark Shore	Runner-up	
2026	Gish Jen	Bad Bad Girl	Finalist	
2026	Roohi Choudhry	Outside Women	Finalist	
2026	Karen Russell	The Antidote	Finalist	
2026	Betty Shamieh	Too Soon	Finalist	

=== Nonfiction ===
Year	Author	Title	Result	Ref.
2006	Stephen Walker	Shockwave: Countdown to Hiroshima	Winner	
2006	Adam Hochschild	Bury the Chains: Prophets and Rebels in the Fight to Free an Empire's Slaves	Runner-up	
2007	Mark Kurlansky	Nonviolence: Twenty-five Lessons From the History of a Dangerous Idea	Winner	
2007	Greg Mortenson and David Oliver Relin	Three Cups of Tea: One Man's Mission to Promote Peace ... One School at a Time	Runner-up	
2008	Edwidge Danticat	Brother, I'm Dying	Winner	
2008	Cullen Murphy	Are We Rome	Runner-up	
2009	Benjamin Skinner	A Crime So Monstrous: Face to Face with Modern Day Slavery	Winner	
2009	Thomas Friedman	Hot, Flat, and Crowded	Runner-up	
2009	Nicholson Baker	Human Smoke: The Beginnings of World War II, the End of Civilization	Finalist	
2009	Joan Baxter	Dust from Our Eyes: An Unblinkered Look at Africa	Finalist	
2009	David Grossman	Writing in the Dark	Finalist	
2009	Ariel Sabar	My Father's Paradise: A Son's Search for His Father's Past	Finalist	
2009	Strobe Talbott	The Great Experiment	Finalist	
2010	Dave Eggers	Zeitoun	Winner	
2010	Justine Hardy	In the Valley of Mist	Runner-up	
2010	Chinua Achebe	The Education of a British-Protected Child	Finalist	
2010	Scott Kilman and Roger Thurow	Enough: Why the Worlds Poorest Starve in an Age of Plenty	Finalist	
2010	Greg Mortenson	Stones into Schools	Finalist	
2010	Elizabeth Norman and Michael Norman	Tears in the Darkness: The Story of the Bataan Death March and Its Aftermath	Finalist	
2011	Wilbert Rideau	In the Place of Justice: A Story of Punishment and Deliverance	Winner	
2011	Isabel Wilkerson	The Warmth of Other Suns	Runner-up	
2011	Kai Bird	Crossing Mandelbaum Gate: Coming of Age Between the Arabs and Israelis, 1956–1978	Finalist	
2011	Conor Grennan	Little Princes	Finalist	
2011	Laura Hillenbrand	Unbroken	Finalist	
2011	Mac McClelland	For Us Surrender Is Out of the Question	Finalist	
2012	Adam Hochschild	To End All Wars: A Story of Loyalty and Rebellion, 1914–1918	Winner	
2012	Annia Ciezadlo	Day of Honey	Runner-up	
2012	Leymah Gbowee	Mighty Be Our Powers: How Sisterhood, Prayer and Sex Changed a Nation at War: A Memoir	Finalist	
2012	Karl Marlantes	What It Is Like to Go to War	Finalist	
2012	Caroline Moorehead	A Train in Winter: An Extraordinary Story of Women, Friendship, and Resistance in Occupied France	Finalist	
2013	Andrew Solomon	Far from the Tree: Parents, Children, and the Search for Identity	Winner	
2013	Gilbert King	Devil in the Grove: Thurgood Marshall, the Groveland Boys, and the Dawn of a New America	Runner-up	
2013	Katherine Boo	Behind the Beautiful Forevers: Life, Death, and Hope in a Mumbai Undercity	Finalist	
2013	Shareen Brysac and Karl Meyer	Pax Ethnica	Finalist	
2013	Carmen Bugan	Burying the Typewriter	Finalist	
2013	Blaine Harden	Escape from Camp 14	Finalist	
2014	Karima Bennoune	Your Fatwa Does Not Apply Here	Winner	
2014	Jo Roberts	Contested Land, Contested Memory: Israel's Jews and Arabs and the Ghosts of Catastrophe	Runner-up	
2014	Katy Butler	Knocking on Heaven's Door: The Path to a Better Way of Death	Finalist	
2014	David Finkel	Thank You for Your Service	Finalist	
2014	Steve McQuiddy	Here on the Edge: How a Small Group of World War II Conscientious Objectors Took Art and Peace from the Margins to the Mainstream	Finalist	
2014	Jesmyn Ward	Men We Reaped	Finalist	
2015	Bryan Stevenson	Just Mercy: A Story of Justice and Redemption	Winner	
2015	Jeff Hobbs	The Short and Tragic Life of Robert Peace	Runner-up	
2015	Jeff Chang	Who We Be: A Cultural History of Race in Post-Civil Rights America	Finalist	
2015	Lacy Johnson	The Other Side	Finalist	
2015	Elizabeth D. Samet	No Man's Land: Preparing for War and Peace in Post-9/11 America	Finalist	
2015	Meline Toumani	There Was and There Was Not: A Journey Through Hate and Possibility in Turkey, Armenia, and Beyond	Finalist	
2016	Susan Southard	Nagasaki: Life After Nuclear War	Winner	
2016	Kennedy Odede and Jessica Posner	Find Me Unafraid	Runner-up	
2016	Ta-Nehisi Coates	Between the World and Me	Finalist	
2016	Wil Haygood	Showdown: Thurgood Marshall and the Supreme Court Nomination That Changed America	Finalist	
2016	Wab Kinew	The Reason You Walk	Finalist	
2016	Jan Jarboe Russell	The Train to Crystal City: FDR's Secret Prisoner Exchange Program and America's Only Family Internment Camp During World War II	Finalist	
2017	David Wood	What Have We Done: The Moral Injury of Our Longest Wars	Winner	
2017	Ben Rawlence	City of Thorns: Nine Lives in the World's Largest Refugee Camp	Runner-up	
2018	Ta-Nehisi Coates	We Were Eight Years in Power: An American Tragedy	Winner	
2018	Michelle Kuo	Reading with Patrick	Runner-up	
2019	Eli Saslow	Rising Out of Hatred	Winner	
2019	Wil Haygood	Tigerland	Runner-up	
2019	David W. Blight	Frederick Douglass: Prophet of Freedom	Finalist	
2019	Khalida Brohi	I Should Have Honor	Finalist	
2019	Anthony Hinton with Lara Love Hardin	The Sun Does Shine: How I Found Life and Freedom on Death Row	Finalist	
2019	Tara Westover	Educated	Finalist	
2020	Chanel Miller	Know My Name	Winner	
2020	Jennifer Eberhardt	The Beekeeper of Aleppo	Runner-up	
2021	Ariana Neumann	When Time Stopped: A Memoir of My Father's War and What Remains	Winner	
2021	Jordan Ritter Conn	The Road from Raqqa	Runner-up	
2021	Michele Harper	The Beauty in Breaking: A Memoir	Finalist	
2021	Toni Jenson	Carry: A Memoir of Survival on Stolen Land	Finalist	
2021	Valarie Kaur	See No Stranger: A Memoir and Manifesto of Revolutionary Love	Finalist	
2021	Isabel Wilkerson	Caste: The Origins of Our Discontents	Finalist	
2022	Clint Smith	How the Word Is Passed: A Reckoning with the History of Slavery Across America	Winner	
2022	Andrea Elliott	Invisible Child: Poverty, Survival & Hope in an American City	Runner-up	
2022	Heather McGhee	The Sum of Us: What Racism Costs Everyone and How We Can Prosper Together	Finalist	
2022	Evan Osnos	Wildland: The Making of America's Fury	Finalist	
2022	Amanda Ripley	High Conflict: Why We Get Trapped and How We Get Out	Finalist	
2022	Shugri Said Salh	The Last Nomad: Coming of Age in the Somali Desert	Finalist	
2023	Robert Samuels and Toluse Olorunnipa	His Name Is George Floyd: One Man's Life and the Struggle for Racial Justice	Winner	
2023	Adam Hochschild	American Midnight: The Great War, a Violent Peace, and Democracy's Forgotten Crisis	Runner-up	
2023	Catherine Ceniza Choy	Asian American Histories of the United States	Finalist	
2023	Zarifa Ghafari with Hannah Lucinda Smith	Zarifa: A Woman's Battle in a Man's World	Finalist	
2023	Ben Rawlence	The Treeline: The Last Forest and the Future of Life on Earth	Finalist	
2023	Putsata Reang	Ma and Me: A Memoir	Finalist	
2024	Victor Luckerson	Built from the Fire: The Epic Story of Tulsa's Greenwood District, America's Black Wall Street	Winner	
2024	Tania Branigan	Red Memory: The Afterlives of China's Cultural Revolution	Runner-up	
2024	Darrin Bell	The Talk	Finalist	
2024	Dina Nayeri	Who Gets Believed?: When the Truth Isn't Enough	Finalist	
2024	Edwin Raymond with Jon Sternfeld	An Inconvenient Cop: My Fight to Change Policing in America	Finalist	
2024	Dana Sachs	All Else Failed: The Unlikely Volunteers at the Heart of the Migrant Aid Crisis	Finalist	
2025	Sunil Amrith	The Burning Earth: A History	Winner	
2025	Lauren Markham	A Map of Future Ruins: On Borders and Belonging	Runner-up	
2025	David Greenberg	John Lewis: A Life	Finalist	
2025	Leah Hunt-Lendrix and Astra Taylor	Solidarity: The Past, Present, and Future of a World-Changing Idea	Finalist	
2025	Annie Jacobsen	Nuclear War: A Scenario	Finalist	
2025	Wendy Pearlman	The Home I Worked to Make: Voices from the New Syrian Diaspora	Finalist	
2026
2026	Kevin Sack	Mother Emanuel: Two Centuries of Race, Resistance, and Forgiveness in One Charleston Church	Winner	
2026	Eve L. Ewing	Original Sins: The (Mis) education of Black and Native Children and the Construction of American Racism	Runner-up	
2026	Danielle Leavitt	By the Second Spring: Seven Lives and One Year of the War in Ukraine	Finalist	
2026	Amanda Knox	Free: My Search for Meaning	Finalist	
2026	Calvin Duncan and Sophie Cull	The Jailhouse Lawyer	Finalist	
2026	Jack Fairweather	The Prosecutor: One Man’s Battle to Bring Nazis to Justice	Finalist	

=== Lifetime Achievement Award ===
Year	Author	Ref.
2006	Studs Terkel	
2007	Elie Wiesel	
2008	Taylor Branch	
2009	Nicholas Kristof	
2009	Sheryl WuDunn	

=== Richard C. Holbrooke Distinguished Achievement Award ===
Year	Author	Ref.
2010	Geraldine Brooks	
2011	Barbara Kingsolver	
2012	Tim O'Brien	
2013	Wendell Berry	
2014	Louise Erdrich	
2015	Gloria Steinem	
2016	Marilynne Robinson	
2017	Colm Tóibín	
2018	John Irving	
2019	N. Scott Momaday	
2020/2021	Margaret Atwood	
2022	Wil Haygood	
2023	Sandra Cisneros	
2024	Jimmy Carter	
2025	Salman Rushdie	
2026	Ann Patchett	
