= The Sunflower Boys =

2025 novel by Sam Wachman

- Author: Sam Wachman
- Language: English
- Genre: Coming-of-age, historical fiction, LGBTQ+
- Publisher: HarperCollins
- Publication date: August 12, 2025
- Publication place: United States
- Pages: 320
- ISBN: 978-0063418226

The Sunflower Boys is a 2025 debut novel by Sam Wachman. The novel is a bildungsroman set in modern Ukraine before and during the Russian invasion of Ukraine. It received positive reviews. Praise for The Sunflower Boys focused on its depictions of LGBTQ rights in Ukraine and the 2022 siege of Chernihiv.

== Author ==
Wachman was born in Cambridge, Massachusetts to a family of Ukrainian descent. He attended a Quaker school, Cambridge Rindge and Latin School, and Brandeis University. After graduating from Brandeis University, Wachman taught primary school English in Ukraine. He volunteered in Germany, Romania and the United States during the Ukrainian refugee crisis. He also advocated for the release of Rümeysa Öztürk.

The Sunflower Boys was Wachman's debut novel. Wachman wrote short fiction and film criticism for Sonora Review, Berkeley Fiction Review, River Styx, and Bright Lights Film Journal. His work was featured in Ploughshares and The Rumpus. Wachman's next novel is forthcoming in 2028.

== Synopsis ==
The Sunflower Boys follows twelve-year-old Artem, who lives with his mother and younger brother, Yuri, in Chernihiv, Ukraine. Their Hutsul father works in the United States and sends home remittances. Artem harbors secret romantic feelings for his best friend, Viktor.

In February 2022, Artem and his family escape the siege of Chernihiv and seek refuge in Artem's grandfather's home in rural Chernihiv Oblast, in a fictional village along the river Oster named "Vasyukivka" after Vsevolod Nestayko's 1972 novel Toreadors from Vasyukivka. Artem's mother and grandfather are killed in the Northern Ukraine offensive, and Artem and Yuri embark on a dangerous journey westward.

In Lviv, they reunite with their father, who is exempt from the 2022 Ukrainian mobilization but must navigate bureaucratic hurdles to leave the country. Ultimately, he hires a people smuggler to guide them across the Ukrainian Carpathians into Romania.

== Reception and awards ==
Kirkus Reviews and Publishers Weekly both published starred reviews praising the novel. In NPR's Weekend Edition, host Scott Simon called it "a powerful survival story".

Ron Charles wrote for The Washington Post that "Sam Wachman, a writer all of 25 years old, has created that rarest phenomenon: a war novel that feels at once timeless and precisely of the moment."

Bradley Babendir wrote for The Boston Globe that "[t]he line between a serious-minded confrontation with this pitch-black corner of humanity and an exploitive-seeming, schlocky book is thin as fishing line and [Wachman] stays consistently on the right side."

Julia Klein wrote for The Forward that The Sunflower Boys is "[c]onvincing and dramatic ... [it] works on multiple levels. It offers a historically specific look at Ukraine, a celebration of same-sex love, and a meditation on the pull of home. Surefooted in both its craft and its theme, the novel also lauds and exemplifies the power of art." Klein noted that the novel was critical of the Ukrainian government and specifically the 2022 Ukrainian mobilization.

Katie Noah Gibson wrote for Shelf Awareness: "Tender and poignant, shot through with deep sadness and wry humor, The Sunflower Boys is a bittersweet rendering of life in modern-day Ukraine, the effect of war on ordinary lives, and a young person discovering who he is."

The Sunflower Boys was also featured in Harper's Bazaar, Forbes, NPR, People, and The Gay and Lesbian Review.

An excerpt from The Sunflower Boys was published in Electric Literature.

In 2026, The Sunflower Boys won the Dayton Literary Peace Prize. The American Library Association named The Sunflower Boys a RUSA Award Notable Book. The Sunflower Boys was also a finalist for the 2026 Lambda Literary Award in Gay Fiction and longlisted for the Massachusetts Center for the Book 2026 Massachusetts Book Award in Fiction.

The Sunflower Boys has been received positively abroad. Ukrainian scholar and literary critic Улюра Ганна wrote a positive review for Ukrainian literary magazine Читомо. In Estonia, Hea Lugu published a translation by Estonian poet Marge Pärnits in April 2026. It was presented on Vikerraadio and Klassikaraadio, where actor Christopher Rajaveer narrated it. Film director Vahur Laiapea wrote a rave review in Sirp.
