= The Plague of Doves =

2008 novel by Louise Erdrich

- Cover of the Harper Perennial edition
- Author: Louise Erdrich
- Cover artist: Fritz Metsch
- Language: English
- Series: Justice #1
- Genre: Literary fiction
- Publisher: HarperCollins Publishers; Harper Perennial
- Publication date: 2008
- Publication place: United States
- Media type: Novel
- Pages: 352 pp.
- ISBN: 9780060515133
- OCLC: 262886577
- Followed by: The Round House

The Plague of Doves is a 2008 New York Times bestseller and the first entry in a loosely-connected trilogy by Ojibwe author Louise Erdrich. The Plague of Doves follows the townsfolk of the fictional Pluto, North Dakota, who are plagued by a farming family's unsolved murder from generations prior. The novel incorporates Erdrich's multiple narrator trope that is present in other works including the Love Medicine series. Its sequel is the National Book Award winning novel The Round House. Erdrich concluded the "Justice" trilogy with LaRose in 2016.

== Background ==
The central plot of The Plague of Doves revolves around an act of racism that took place in the early 20th century. Peter G. Beidler outlines how Louise Erdrich's plot for the novel was influenced by real-life events that happened in North Dakota in the late 1890s. As Beidler explains, a white family, the Spicers, were murdered by a group of Native Americans. While the murderers were tried and sentenced to death for their crimes, the citizens of the town believed the three witnesses, also Native Americans, were guilty as well. Nine months after the trial, the citizens stormed the jailhouse where the men were being held, overpowered the guards, and proceeded to hang the three men in question. One of the men was a 19-year-old boy named Paul Holy Track, believed to be the direct influence for Erdrich's character, the thirteen-year-old Holy Track.

== Character List ==
- Evelina Harp: The novel's first named narrator. She matures throughout the novel while exploring notions of bisexuality and uncovering Pluto's past.
- Mooshum/ Seraph Milk: Evelina's grandfather who tells her about the reservation's past.
- Shamengwa: Mooshum's brother. He is a violinist with a crippled arm who later tutors Corwin Peace.
- Judge Antone Bazil Coutts: The tribal judge. He is the novel's second narrator. He has an affair with Evelina's aunt Geraldine.
- Corwin Peace: Evelina's elementary school crush. He is a mischievous delinquent born out of wedlock, and he matures under Shamengwa's tutelage.
- Billy Peace: Marn Wolde's husband with familial connections to the area's past. He becomes a spiritual leader to his family and the community.
- Marn Wolde: Billy Peace's wife. She is the novel's third narrator. She seeks eccentric spirituality to escape her self-described prison.
- Uncle Warren Wolde: Marn Wolde's uncle. He is in a psychiatric hospital due to age-related cognitive decline. His past actions have shaped the entire town.
- Dr. Cordelia Lochren: The novel's last narrator. She is the surviving child of a family massacre; she harbors prejudices in her later years.

== Summary ==
The novel begins with a family's grisly murder, with a baby as the only surviving member. A lynch mob blames four innocent Ojibwe people from the nearby reservation and hangs three of them, including a boy named Holy Track.

Years later, a young girl named Evelina, who struggles with her sexuality in grade school, listens to her grandfather's, Mooshum's, tales of Pluto, North Dakota's past. In 1896, a flock of doves terrorized the town and the people within it. Mooshum also explains how he was the only surviving member of the lynch mob. This trauma caused Mooshum to flee the town for years before returning to the reservation, married and ready to start a family. Upon returning, Mooshum and his brother, Shamengwa, develop an alcohol dependency. These tales leave Evelina with more questions than answers, and Mooshum is hesitant to divulge everything. Evelina is nervous to express the attraction she has for both her teacher and her classmate.

Next enters Billy Peace, whose sister is having an affair with John Wildstrand. John is married to Neve Harp, the woman who rejected Mooshum's romantic advances. The affair between John Wildstrand and Billy Peace’s sister results in a child out of wedlock. After the kidnapping of Neve Harp backfires, he goes to join the army. The army is Billy's introduction to religion. When Billy returns home, he starts a church. Billy marries Marn Wolde as both bond over running away from past issues. Marn becomes increasingly unhappy in her marriage and with the way Billy disciplines their children and how he interacts with her. Eventually, Marn murders her husband and flees Pluto with her children in tow.

An older Evelina, now working at a diner, runs into Marn. The interaction recalls Evelina's former attractions to Marn's nephew. Evelina is also provided with information from her former crush and teacher that causes her to suffer mentally. While at the mental hospital, Evelina meets with patients but takes note of the weird actions of one in particular named Warren Wolde. Warren Wolde dies in the hospital after hearing Corwin Peace play the violin while visiting Evelina. Warren's death unravels some of the town's hidden mystery.

== Themes ==
=== Ojibwe and Métis History ===
Métis and Ojibwe history is featured heavily throughout the novel. The Métis connection comes to the forefront with the character Mooshum noting Louis Riel as a personal hero. Evelina also mentions a picture of Riel that her mother kept on display. The characters frequently refer to Riel and imagine what could have been had he succeeded in establishing a Michif nation. Additionally, throughout the novel the characters speak in both Michif and Anishinaabe. As Corrine Bancroft argues, Erdrich's novel allows readers "to face the way history still bleeds into the present and challenges us to develop a type of responsibility that is attentive to different and possibly incommensurate human experiences."

=== Crime ===
Crime and punishment are two prominent themes in The Plague of Doves. Literary critic Lara Feigel notes that Erdrich offers several moments where the issues of what constitutes justice emerge as central to the plot. In addition to the main plot regarding the family's murder, there are other instances of criminal enterprises. For example, Billy Peace plans to rob John Wildstrand of $10,000. For his part, Wildstrand also suggests that the two kidnap Neve, who is his current wife. They agree upon this plan and Billy kidnaps Neve, then makes John tie himself up, and John goes the extra mile to fake tears in front of Neve.

=== Dedication and Love ===
Feigel also explains how the world that Erdrich built is entangled with love and dedication. For example, Joseph and Bull's journey through the storm exemplifies this factor by showcasing their determination to stick together and withstand a cold storm. Evelina and Corwin also remain loyal friends throughout the novel.

== Reception ==
The novel was named a "Best Book of the Year" by The Washington Post, Chicago Tribune, San Francisco Chronicle, and The Christian Science Monitor.

In a review from The New York Times, Bruce Barcott notes that Erdrich created "an often gorgeous, sometimes maddeningly opaque portrait of a community strangled by its own history." In another The New York Times review, Michiko Kakutani states that Erdrich "uses several characters to narrate alternating chapters, giving us a choral story that unfolds from multiple perspectives." Writing for the Los Angeles Times, Brigette Frase described how "Erdrich moves seamlessly from grief to sexual ecstasy, from comedy (Mooshum’s proof of the nonexistence of hell is priceless) to tragedy, from richly layered observations of nature and human nature to magical realism. She is less storyteller than medium. One has the sense that voices and events pour into her and reemerge with crackling intensity, as keening music trembling between sorrow and joy."

== Awards ==
Additionally, the book was selected as a finalist for the Pulitzer Prize for Fiction in 2009. In the same year, the novel also won the Anisfield-Wolf Book Award, which is awarded to books that have made a vital contribution to understanding racism and human diversity.

Year	Award	Category	Result	Ref.
2009	Anisfield-Wolf Book Award	Fiction	Won	
2009	Audie Award	Multi-Voiced Performance	Finalist	
2009	Dayton Literary Peace Prize	—	Finalist	
2009	Minnesota Book Awards	Novel & Short Story	Won	
2009	Pulitzer Prize	Fiction	Finalist	
2010	International Dublin Literary Award	—	Longlisted	
