= I'll Tell You When I'm Home =

2025 memoir by Hala Alyan

- Author: Hala Alyan
- Language: English
- Genre: Memoir
- Publisher: Avid Reader Press / Simon & Schuster
- Publication date: June 3, 2025
- Publication place: United States
- Media type: Print
- Pages: 257
- ISBN: 978-1-9821-8258-8

I'll Tell You When I'm Home is a 2025 memoir by the Palestinian-American writer Hala Alyan. It is Alyan's first work of nonfiction, following two novels and five poetry collections. The book was published by Avid Reader Press, an imprint of Simon & Schuster, on June 3, 2025. It was a finalist for the 2026 Pulitzer Prize for Memoir or Autobiography.

== Summary ==
The memoir centers on Alyan's decision, after years of trying to conceive and repeated miscarriages, to have a child through a surrogate. Structured around the months of the pregnancy, it moves between this narrative and the history of Alyan's family, who left Gaza, Kuwait and Lebanon at different points across several decades. The book also addresses Alyan's marriage, her past addiction, and her relationship to Arabic after a childhood spent partly in the United States, where she was known as Holly.

== Reception ==
Reviewing the book for 4Columns, Leslie Camhi wrote that Alyan rifles through decades of her own and her family's history, and noted that the ongoing devastation in Gaza, where Alyan's father was born, appears only briefly in the memoir despite the family history it recounts. The book was named an NPR Book of the Year and one of Time's 100 Must-Read Books of the year, and was a finalist for the Pulitzer Prize.
