= Toumani =

Toumani is a given name and a surname. Notable people with the name include:

- Toumani Camara (born 2000), Belgian basketball player
- Toumani Diabaté (1965–2024), Malian musician
- Toumani Diagouraga (born 1987), French former football player
- Amadou Toumani Touré (1948–2020), Malian politician
- Meline Toumani (born 1975), American author and journalist
