= Margaret Wrinkle =

American novelist

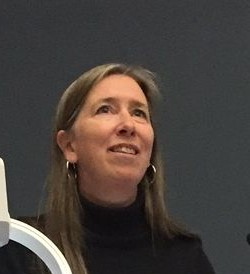
- Wrinkle at the 2015 Spring Antioch Writers' Workshop in Yellow Springs
- Born: Birmingham, Alabama, U.S.
- Occupation: Writer
- Writing career
- Notable work: Wash (2013)
- Website: margaretwrinkle.com

Margaret Wrinkle is an American writer and documentary film maker. She is known for her 2013 novel, Wash, which was a fiction runner-up for the 2014 Dayton Literary Peace Prize, and for co-creating the 1996 documentary broken/ground.

== Life ==
Wrinkle is a seventh-generation Southerner from Birmingham, Alabama. She described her parents as "Southern intellectuals". A voracious reader, Wrinkle was five years old when her parents realized television programs were giving her nightmares. They told her the television was broken, and no one used it for the next 10 years. "As a child, I read constantly, and the characters in books became like people in my life."

Wrinkle's family employed Ida Mae Lawson Washington as a domestic worker. "She had a big influence on my life," Wrinkle says. When Washington died, Wrinkle moved back to Birmingham from California, and began working on a documentary about black women in domestic service, work that eventually became broken\ground. Her experiences interviewing Washington's family helped push her into early childhood education. "From 1992 to 1997, I taught in inner city Birmingham schools and used painting, photography, video, and writing to work with children from the poorest income ZIP code in the United States. I taught them to read by asking them to tell their own stories."

== Literary work ==
Wrinkle's novel, Wash, focuses on slave breeding in Tennessee during the early 1800s. The main character, named Wash, is hired for breeding by other nearby slaveowners. Richardson’s idea was to “put him with three or four per day. Even if only some take, that will mean ten new negroes, worth two hundred apiece once weaned.” The book was a runner-up for the 2014 Dayton Literary Peace Prize. It was published by Atlantic Monthly Press.

== Film work ==
Wrinkle's documentary broken\ground, made with Chris Lawson about the racial divide in her historically conflicted hometown, was a winner of the Council on Foundations Film Festival. During the filming, Wrinkle says, "I started to get a haunting sense that we are still deeply affected by patterns laid down during slavery and began to see how many of our cultural differences could be traced all the way back to that original clash between Africa and Europe."

== Awards and honors ==
- 2013 Wall Street Journal's Best Books of 2013
- 2014 Fiction runner-up for the Dayton Literary Peace Prize

== Works ==
=== Fiction ===
- Wash (novel) 2013

=== Film ===
- broken\ground (documentary) 1996
