= Salt Houses =

2017 book by Hala Alyan

- First edition (publ. Houghton Mifflin Harcourt)
- Author: Hala Alyan
- Language: English
- Genre: Historical fiction
- Publisher: Houghton Mifflin Harcourt
- Publication date: 2017
- Publication place: United States
- Pages: 320 (first edition)
- ISBN: 9781328915856

Salt Houses is a 2017 historical fiction novel by Palestinian-American author Hala Alyan.

Salt Houses follows the story of four generations of the fictional Palestinian middle-class family, the Yacoubs. Beginning in 1963 and concluding in 2014, Alyan details the family's journey through the Six Day War (1967), the First Intifada (1987), the Gulf War (1990), the Second Intifada (2000), 9/11 (2001), and the 2006 Lebanon War.

Each chapter of the book follows a different member of the Yacoub family as they progress through the years, reading more like a collection of short stories that provide a holistic perspective. While this unique structure was largely praised, some reviews point out that it resulted in a lack of character development. Alyan is generally praised for providing a perspective into the plight of the privileged as opposed to focusing solely on Palestinians who live in refugee camps. The story focuses on migration and the struggle between staying connected with one's traditions and still finding a home in a new country.

== Plot ==
The story begins with Salma in Nablus, 1963. As her daughter Alia prepares for her wedding to Atef, Salma reads her future in a cup of coffee dregs. Though Salma reads a life full of uncertainty, instability, travel, and loss, she keeps the negative to herself, telling Alia that she sees a quick pregnancy and Atef's love for her.

The Yacoubs are a middle-class family who are already dispersed when the novel begins as Salma was from Jaffa, but had to flee to Nablus following WWII and Widad, Salma's very religious oldest daughter, is living in Kuwait in an arranged marriage.

Mustafa, Salma's middle child, struggles with his faith despite finding a strong community in his mosque. An eloquent speaker, Mustafa uses his talent to mobilize other young Palestinians by speaking of rebellion and anger. As he is best friends with Atef, Salma worries about the influence the two have on each other as they both turn to extremism. Though Mustafa's love for a working-class girl, Aya, could provide him a way out, his fear of disappointing his mother by marrying beneath their class leads him to devote himself entirely to his cause.

In the 1967 Six-Day War, the family is uprooted to Kuwait City, though Atef and Mustafa stay behind to fight. Both men are arrested and tortured during which Atef gives up Mustafa, resulting in Mustafa's death in an Israeli jail. Though the family never recovers Mustafa's body or learns what truly happened to him, Atef blames himself for Mustafa's death and is overwhelmed by guilt which results in his downward spiral caused by PTSD and depression when he joins Alia in Kuwait.

In Kuwait City, Atef becomes withdrawn and spends most of his time writing letters that he will never send to his late best friend in an attempt to process his emotions and spare Alia's. Though Alia is less affected by her brother's death, she hates the heat and unfamiliarity of the new city, and the fact that they are unable to return to their home. However, Alia and Atef, still full of love for each other, attempt to create a happy life and have three children: Riham, Souad, and Karam.

In the increasingly globalized world, Atef worries deeply about the influence of the West on his children, though the couple still sends the three children to international schools for a better education. The family is uprooted yet again at the start of the Gulf War (1990) and is dispersed with Alia and Atef moving to Amman, Jordan and then Beirut, Lebanon, Riham living in Amman with her husband, Latif, and Souad and Karam attending university in Paris, France and Boston, United States, respectively.

Due to her close relationship with her grandmother, Salma, Riham is deeply religious. She and her generous doctor husband, Latif, remain in Amman and care for poor patients and refugees in their shed. Though Riham wants to support this, she is traumatized by the cries of the injured at all hours and ends up somewhat resenting their generosity.

Even more rebellious than her mother, Souad has a whirlwind marriage to Elie and has two children, Manar and Zain, who grow up completely Americanized in the United States. Karam marries Budur and they raise one child, Linah, who is best friends with Zain. Though they are so dispersed, the family attempts to convene for summers with Alia and Atef in Beirut, and Riham and Latif eventually relocate there.

Zain, Manar, and Linah face racism against Arabs in the United States following 9/11, and, during their summers in Beirut, face racism against Palestinians. When visiting Beirut, the children witness war and violence as well.

The story ends with Souad, following her divorce from Elie, moving her family to Lebanon and Zain and Linah finding Atef's old letters to Mustafa. The grandchildren of Alia and Atef try to discover their family's history as Manar attempts to feel a connection to her Palestinian heritage by traveling to Jaffa. Alia is diagnosed with Alzheimer's disease and, as she deteriorates, longs for a feeling of belonging and home.

== Characters ==
- Salma is the matriarch of the Yacoub family and a religiously devout wife to Hussam and mother to three children Widad, Alia, and Mustafa.
- Hussam is the husband of Salma and father of Widad, Alia, and Mustafa.
- Mustafa is the middle child of Salma and Hussam. As a representation of "the young man in a rudderless moment, looking for anything that will point him north", Mustafa finds security in the mosque, though this connection causes Mustafa to turn to extremism. During the Six Day War, Mustafa is arrested, tortured, and killed in an Israeli jail.
- Widad is the oldest child of Salma and Hussam. She is described as conservative, quiet, and very committed to Islam. Widad is a young bride in an arranged marriage which moves her to Kuwait.
- Alia is the youngest child of Salma and Hussam. Her rebellious and head-strong nature quickly makes her the focal point of the novel with the story primarily focusing on her and her husband, their children, and their grandchildren. Alia defies her very religious mother by refusing to wear a hijab and often involves herself in conversations about war and other generally male-dominated conversations. She is mother to Riham, Souad, and Karam and favors Karam.
- Atef is the husband of Alia and the best friend of Mustafa. Atef shared Mustafa's activist ideology and fought with him in the Six Day War. He was arrested and tortured in the war and, though he was released and moved safely to Amman with Alia, he struggled PTSD and depression. He is father to Riham, Souad, and Karam and favors Riham.
- Riham, the eldest daughter of Alia and Atef, is very close with her grandmother, Salma. This leads her to live a very religiously devout life and get married at a young age to an older widower, Latif. She becomes the stepmother of Latif's son, Abdullah, and attempts to live a rather quiet life close to her parents in Amman.
- Latif is the husband of Riham. A quiet and generous doctor, Latif opens their home in Amman to injured refugees and patients to provide them free care in their shed.
- Abdullah is the son of Latif and the stepson of Riham. Similarly to Mustafa and Atef, Abdullah was filled with frustration towards the occupation of Palestine and flirted with extremism though never acted upon it. He expressed his frustration with his family for not being angry enough to fight for Palestine.
- Souad is the youngest daughter of Alia and Atef and is characterized as rebellious, unruly, and fearless. Though she and Alia constantly quarrel, Atef consistently highlights the similarities between the two strong and independent women. Souad is studying in Paris at the start of the Gulf War and impulsively marries her then-boyfriend, Elie. They ultimately move to Boston to live near her brother, Karam, where they have two children and then divorce. Souad later moves with her children to Beirut where Alia and Atef live.
- Elie is the husband, and later ex-husband, of Souad. Their whirlwind romance and marriage closely follows the start of the Gulf War that affected both Souad and Elie, whose families lived in Kuwait. Elie is described as the one person more volatile than Souad.
- Zain is the son of Souad and Elie. He grows up very Americanized and is best friends with Karam's daughter, Linah.
- Manar is the daughter of Souad and Elie. Like her brother, she also grows up Americanized.
- Karam is the son of Alia and Atef, husband of Budur, and father of Linah. After moving to Boston for university, Karam stays there for much of his life and returns only to visit his family. He is described as quiet and kind.
- Budur is married to Karam and mother to Linah.
- Linah is the daughter of Karam and Budur and best friend of Zain, Souad's son. She's characterized as curious and adventurous, though it is from her perspective that readers see the racism and violence that the children experience.

== Context ==
=== Global refugee and migration crisis ===
According to the United Nations, the world is currently facing "the worst migration crisis since World War II". This makes the story of the Yacoub family very relevant as it communicates a personalized story of those who must leave their homes, but do not reside in refugee camps. In an Al-Jazeera interview, Alyan said that "the Trump era has amplified issues that have always existed... in that sense, I'm happy this book has come out in an era of literal and psychological borders". The Yacoubs provide an insight into the mental and emotional ramifications of the migration crisis as opposed to the physical impacts that are generally emphasized in popular discussion.

== Reception ==
Salt Houses has been generally well received, including starred reviews from Kirkus Reviews, Publishers Weekly, and Shelf Awareness. Kirkus called the book "[a] deeply moving look inside the Palestinian diaspora." Publishers Weekly highlighted the author's writing, stating, "Alyan’s excellent storytelling and deft handling of the complex relationships ensures that readers will not soon forget the Yacoub family."

NPR, Nylon, Kirkus Reviews, Bustle, and BookPage named Salt Houses one of the best books of 2017.

Awards for Salt Houses
Year	Award	Result	Ref.
2017	Goodreads Choice Award for Historical Fiction	Nominee	
2018	Arab American Book Award for Fiction	Winner	
2018	Aspen Words Literary Prize	Longlist	
2018	Dayton Literary Peace Prize for Fiction	Winner	
