= Zeina Hashem Beck =

Lebanese poet

- زينة هاشم بيك
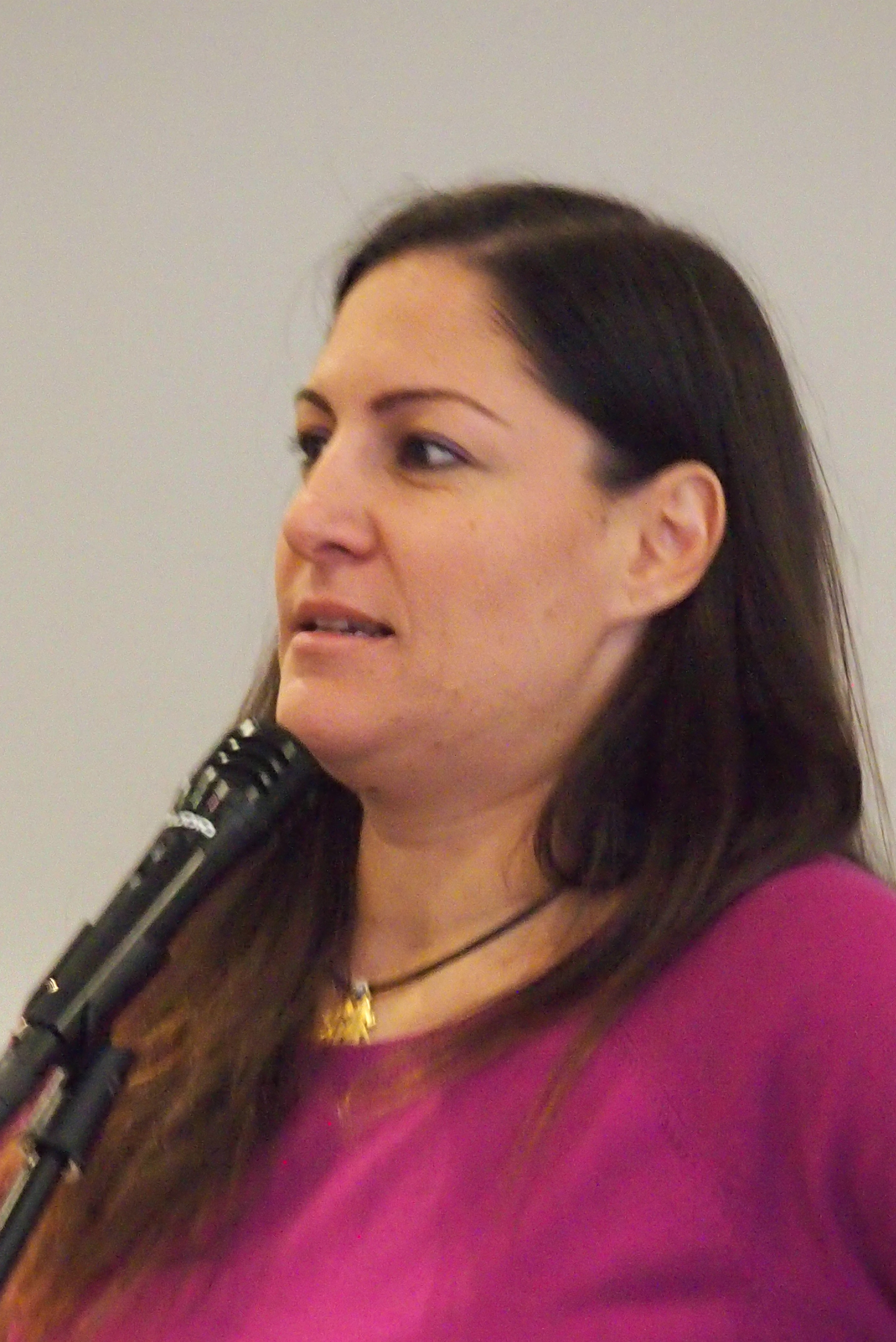
- Beck at a reading in 2017
- Born: Tripoli, Lebanon
- Education: American University of Beirut
- Occupation: Poet
- Writing career
- Notable work: O
- Notable awards: George Ellenbogen Poetry Award (2023)
- Website: www.zeinahashembeck.com

Zeina Hashem Beck (Arabic: زينة هاشم بيك) is a Lebanese poet. She is the author of the poetry collections To Live in Autumn, Louder than Hearts, and O, which won the 2023 George Ellenbogen Poetry Award. Her poem "Maqam" won Poetry magazine's 2017 Frederick Bock Prize.

== Life and career ==
Hashem Beck was born and raised in Tripoli, Lebanon. She moved to Beirut at 18 and studied English literature at the American University of Beirut, where she earned a BA and an MA.

Her first poetry collection, To Live in Autumn, was published by The Backwaters Press in 2014 after winning the 2013 Backwaters Prize in Poetry. In 2016, her chapbook 3arabi Song won the Rattle Chapbook Prize, and There Was and How Much There Was was published by smith/doorstop (UK) as a Laureate's Choice selected by Carol Ann Duffy.

Her second full-length collection, Louder than Hearts, was published in 2017 after winning the 2016 May Sarton New Hampshire Poetry Prize. In 2017, her poem "Maqam" won the Frederick Bock Prize from Poetry magazine.

Hashem Beck writes in English and Arabic. In interviews, she has discussed a bilingual poetic form she calls "The Duet", in which English and Arabic poems can be read separately and in relation to one another. A 2026 article in Humanities and Social Sciences Communications discussed her use of shape poetry, translingual poetics, and multilingual forms across her poetry collections. While living in Dubai, she founded and hosted an open mic night. After living in Dubai, she moved to California in 2022.

Penguin Books published her third full-length collection, O. It won the 2023 George Ellenbogen Poetry Award from the Arab American National Museum. Hashem Beck is also the co-host, with poet Farah Chamma, of Maqsouda, a podcast about Arabic poetry, and co-edited the anthology We Call to the Eye & the Night: Love Poems by Writers of Arab Heritage with Hala Alyan.

== Selected works ==
=== Poetry collections ===
- To Live in Autumn. The Backwaters Press (at the University of Nebraska Press), 2014. Reviewed in New Orleans Review.
- Louder than Hearts. Bauhan Publishing, 2017. Reviewed in The London Magazine and Asian Review of Books.
- O. Penguin Books, 2022. Winner of the 2023 George Ellenbogen Poetry Award. Reviewed or discussed in Chicago Review of Books, L'Orient Today, and Poetry School.

=== Chapbooks ===
- 3arabi Song. Rattle, 2016. Reviewed in World Literature Today and So to Speak.
- There Was and How Much There Was. smith/doorstop (UK-only release), 2016.

=== Anthologies edited ===
- We Call to the Eye & the Night: Love Poems by Writers of Arab Heritage. Persea Books, 2023. Co-edited with Hala Alyan.

=== Selected poems ===
- "Maqam", Poetry, 2017.
- "There, There, Grieving", Academy of American Poets' Poem-a-Day, 2018.
- "Standup Sonnet", Academy of American Poets' Poem-a-Day, 2025.

== Awards and honors ==
- 2013 Backwaters Prize in Poetry, for To Live in Autumn
- 2016 Rattle Chapbook Prize, for 3arabi Song
- 2016 May Sarton New Hampshire Poetry Prize, for Louder than Hearts
- 2017 Frederick Bock Prize, for "Maqam"
- 2023 George Ellenbogen Poetry Award, for O
