= Karima Bennoune =

Algerian-American professor

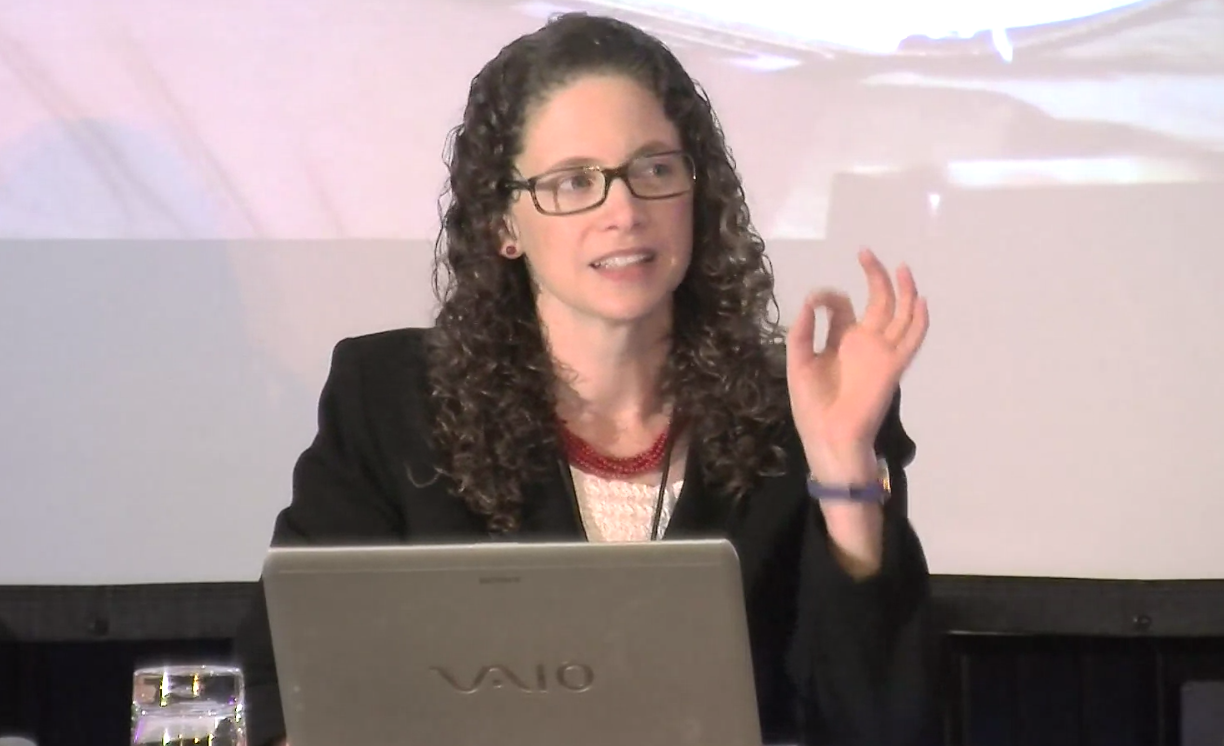
- Education: B.A. in History and Semiotics, Brown University (1988); J.D., University of Michigan Law School (1994); M.A. in Middle Eastern and North African Studies, University of Michigan Rackham Graduate School (1994); Graduate Certificate in Women's Studies, University of Michigan (1994)
- Occupation: Professor of Law
- Awards: Dayton Literary Peace Prize (2014)

Karima Bennoune is an Algerian American who is the Louis M. Simes Professor of Law at the University of Michigan Law School. She was the Homer G. Angelo and Ann Berryhill Endowed Chair in International Law and Martin Luther King Jr. Professor of Law when she taught at the UC Davis School of Law. She was also United Nations Special Rapporteur in the field of cultural rights from October 2015 to October 2021.

== Education ==
- J.D., University of Michigan Law School 1994
- M.A. Middle Eastern and North African Studies, University of Michigan Rackham Graduate School 1994
- Graduate Certificate, Women's Studies, University of Michigan 1994
- B.A. History and Semiotics, Brown University 1988

== Career ==
Before coming to the University of Michigan Law School, Bennoune was the Homer G. Angelo and Ann Berryhill Endowed Chair in International Law and Martin Luther King Jr. Professor of Law at the UC Davis School of Law. Before UC Davis, Bennoune was a professor of law and Arthur L. Dickson Scholar at Rutgers School of Law – Newark.

She won the Dayton Literary Peace Prize (2014) for her book, Your Fatwa Does Not Apply Here: Untold Stories from the Fight Against Muslim Fundamentalism.
