= Matthew Spangler =

American dramatist

Matthew Spangler is an American playwright, director, and professor of performance studies.

== Body of work ==
Matthew Spangler's plays have been produced on Broadway, in London's West End at Wyndham's Theatre and the Playhouse Theatre, off Broadway at 59E59 Theatres, and at theatres throughout the world.

He has written fifteen plays, but is best known for his adaptation of Khaled Hosseini’s novel The Kite Runner. His most recent play, an adaptation of Christy Lefteri's novel The Beekeeper of Aleppo, co- written with Nesrin Alrefaai and directed by Miranda Cromwell, opened at the Nottingham Playhouse in February 2023 followed by a five-month tour of the UK and Ireland.

His plays include Operation Ajax, about the CIA led coup against then Iranian Prime Minister Mohammad Mossadegh in 1953; Albatross, based on the poem "The Rime of the Ancient Mariner"; Tortilla Curtain based on the book by T. C. Boyle; The Forgotten Empress, about the Mughal Empress Noor Jahan, which has been presented in Los Angeles, Pakistan, San Jose, San Francisco, and Houston; and Together Tea based on the novel by Marjan Kamali. Other plays include one-person shows of James Joyce’s Dubliners and Finnegans Wake; A Paradise It Seems, an adaptation of John Cheever's short stories; Mozart!, a musical theatre adaptation of Wolfgang Amadeus Mozart’s letters; and adaptation of Jasmin Darznik's Masquerade. He co-writes many of his plays.

== Awards ==
San Francisco Bay Area Theatre Critics Circle Awards: Best Original Script, Best Overall Production - The Kite Runner.

== Education ==
Matthew Spangler holds a bachelor's degree from Northwestern University in Performance Studies, an M.Phil. in Theatre from Trinity College in Dublin, Ireland, and a Ph.D. from the University of North Carolina at Chapel Hill.

== Author credits ==
Matthew Spangler's writing has been published in Theatre Journal, Text and Performance Quarterly, The James Joyce Quarterly, The New Hibernia Review, Theatre Survey, Nineteenth-Century Literature, SIAR: The Journal of the Western Institute of Irish Studies, The South Atlantic Review, The Biographical Dictionary of Southern Writers, The Art of Elizabeth Bishop, and Performing the Crossroads: Critical Essays in Performance Studies and Irish Culture.

His book Staging Intercultural Ireland: New Plays and Practitioner Perspectives, (co-edited with Charlotte McIvor) about immigration and the performing arts in Ireland, is published by Cork University Press.

His play The Kite Runner, based on the novel by Khaled Hosseini, is published by Bloomsbury in the UK and Penguin in the US. Albatross is published by Stage Rights.

== Employment ==
Spangler is writer in residence at the Hinterland Festival of Literature & Arts in Ireland. He is professor of performance studies at San Jose State University in California.
