= Alexander Starritt =

Scottish-German writer

Alexander Starritt (born 1985) is a Scottish-German novelist, journalist and entrepreneur. Starritt was educated at Somerville College, Oxford. He came to public attention in 2017 with the release of his debut novel The Beast. He was also one of the founding team on the policy platform Apolitical, which in 2018 was listed by US business magazine Fast Company as one of the World's 'Most Innovative Companies'.

Starritt has also published several translations from German, including works by Stefan Zweig and Arthur Schnitzler. In 2020 he published We Germans, a novel about Germans defeated on the Eastern Front of World War II. It was the winner of the 2021 Dayton Literary Peace Prize; Starritt donated the prize money to his alma mater, Somerville College, Oxford to fund a new Sanctuary Scholarship in memory of his mother.

== The Beast ==
The Beast is a satire of British tabloid journalism. It has been described by critics as a successor to Evelyn Waugh's novel Scoop. It tells the story of a downtrodden sub-editor, Jeremy Underwood, who notices two figures dressed in burqas outside the offices of the tabloid newspaper where he works. When he mentions this to his colleagues, their paranoia and hunger for a story take over. The Beast's journalists come to believe they are the target of an imminent terrorist attack and events quickly escalate out of control.

The novel deals with themes such as the rapaciousness of the tabloids, the decline of print journalism, and Islamophobia in the British media. Several critics have pointed out that the novel contains a great deal of affection for the world it describes. For example, the Scottish journalist Hugh Macdonald, reviewing the novel in The National, wrote, "This may not be a love letter to the ailing print media but it will serve as an elegy."

== Drayton and Mackenzie ==
Drayton and Mackenzie (2025) was the first novel for fifteen years to be longlisted for the Financial Times Business Book of the Year Award.

== Bibliography ==
=== Books ===
- Starritt, Alexander (2017). The Beast. London: Head of Zeus. ISBN 978-1784979959.
- Starritt, Alexander (2020). We Germans. JM Originals. p. 208. ISBN 9781529317244.
- Starritt, Alexander (2025). Drayton and Mackenzie. London: Swift Press. p. 578. ISBN 9781800755260.

=== Translations ===
- Starritt, Alexander (2017). Late Fame by Arthur Schnitzler. London: NYRB Books. ISBN 978-1681370842.
- Starritt, Alexander (2013). A Chess Story by Stefan Zweig. London: Pushkin Press. ISBN 978-1784979959.

=== TEDx lectures ===
- TEDx Talks (19 December 2017). "What Happens When You Watch The News | Alexander Starritt at TEDxFrankfurt". TEDx Talks.
