= The Round House (novel) =

2012 novel by Louise Erdrich

- Author: Louise Erdrich
- Language: English
- Series: Justice #2
- Genre: Literary fiction, political fiction, mystery and suspense
- Publisher: Harper
- Publication date: October 2, 2012
- Publication place: United States
- Media type: Print (hardcover)
- Pages: 336 pp. (hardcover 1st ed.)
- Awards: National Book Award for Fiction (2012); Alex Awards (2013)
- ISBN: 9780062065247 (hardcover 1st ed.)
- OCLC: 778314690
- Preceded by: The Plague of Doves
- Followed by: LaRose

The Round House is a novel by the American writer Louise Erdrich first published on October 2, 2012, by HarperCollins. The Round House is Erdrich's 14th novel and is part of her "justice trilogy" of novels, which includes The Plague of Doves released in 2008 and LaRose in 2016. The Round House follows the story of Joe Coutts, a 13-year-old boy who is frustrated with the poor investigation into his mother's gruesome attack and sets out to find his mother's attacker with the help of his best friends, Cappy, Angus, and Zack. Like most of Erdrich's other works, The Round House is set on an Ojibwe reservation in North Dakota.

The Round House won the National Book Award for Fiction in 2012.

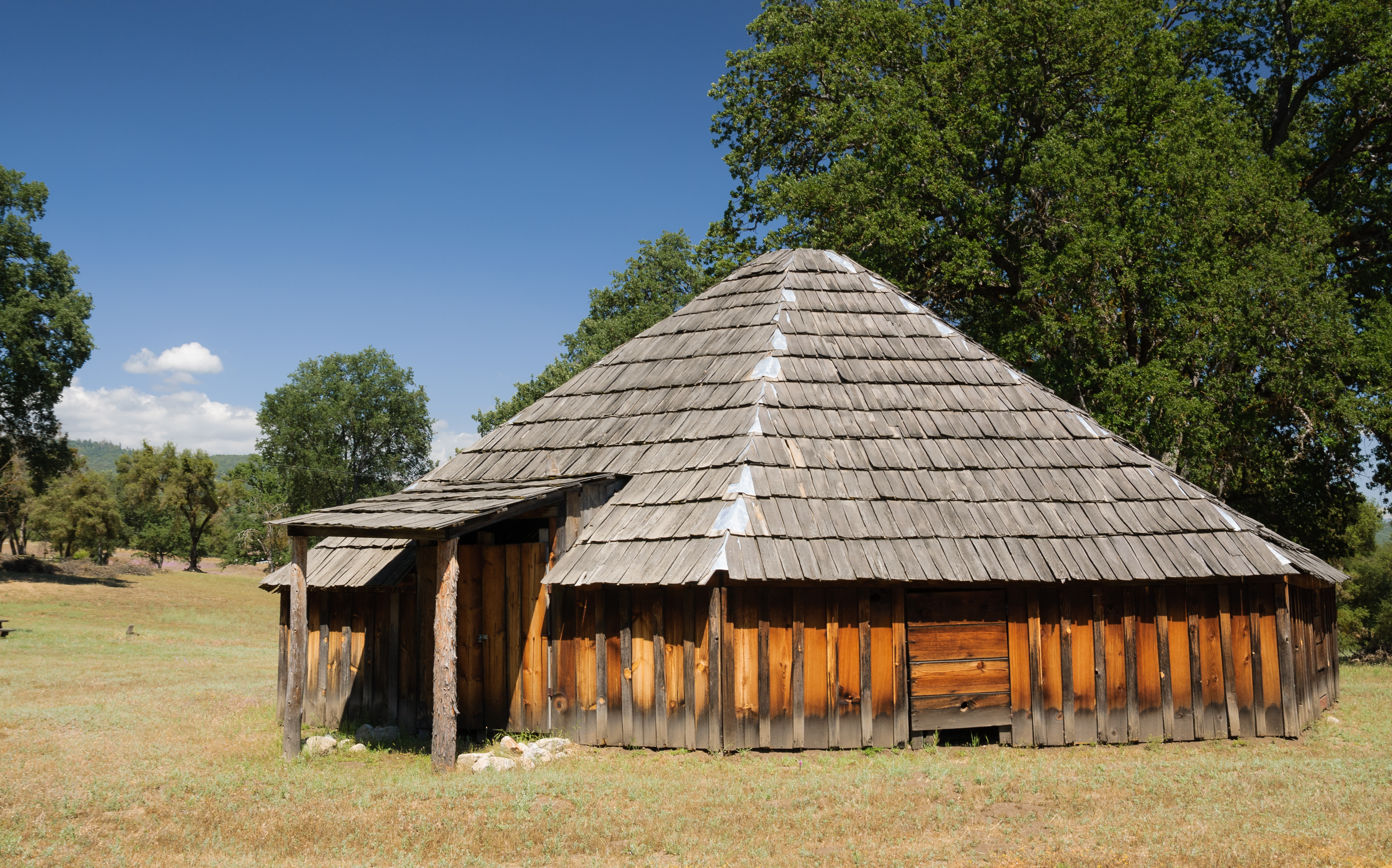
Exterior, Wassama Round House

== Background ==
The Round House was originally published in 2012. The novel is set in 1988 and is narrated by thirteen-year-old Joe Coutts as he attempts to avenge his mother after she is brutally raped. Erdrich wrote the novel while diagnosed with cancer, and has stated in interviews that the diagnosis impacted her productivity and passion for writing, though she was still able to write and publish The Round House, as well as a children's book and a new, revised version of her novel The Antelope Wife.

Erdrich was heavily inspired by the works of William Faulkner's Yoknapatawpha novels. Because of this, Erdrich's novels, including The Round House, are all primarily set in the same fictional location centered around the people who lived there throughout multiple generations. The Round House, specifically, takes place in the same reservation as one of Erdrich's previous works, The Plague of Doves, and the same one that appears in the conclusion to the trilogy, LaRose. However, the significance of this North Dakota reservation, similar to the reservation in Erdrich's Love Medicine series, stems from her own upbringing as an Ojibwe child in North Dakota.

== Characters ==
- Antone (Joe) Coutts: The protagonist of the novel is a 13-year-old boy named Joe who seeks out revenge against the man who raped his mother.
- Antone (Bazil) Coutts: Bazil is Joe's father, a tribal judge who uses his knowledge of the law and past cases to discover the true culprit.
- Geraldine Coutts: Geraldine is Joe's mother, who was violently raped and falls into a deep depression throughout the novel as a result.
- Virgil (Cappy) Lafournais: Cappy is Joe's best friend. He is characterized as exceedingly loyal and becomes an accomplice in Joe's revenge plot and Linden's murder.
- Uncle Whitey: Uncle Whitey is Joe's uncle and the owner of the gas station that plays a significant role in The Round House.
- Sonja: Sonja is Uncle Whitey's partner at the gas station and a former stripper whom everyone believes to be Whitey's wife, though she is not. Joe is attracted to her, and she treats him like a son.
- Mayla Wolfskin: Mayla is a Native woman who worked a while for Curtis Yeltow, the fictional, in-world senator of South Dakota. Linden fell in love with her before killing her out of jealousy.
- Linden Lark: Linden is Linda Lark's brother, characterized as a racist and violent man, and the man that rapes Geraldine and murders Mayla.
- Linda Lark Wishkob: Linda is Linden's twin sister, a white woman, who was abandoned by her birth parents due to birth defects and adopted into an Ojibwe family.

== Plot summary ==
The novel opens with Joe Coutts and his father, Judge Bazil Coutts, pulling out saplings from their house's garden and foundation. They realize Joe's mother and Bazil's wife, Geraldine Coutts, has not come home from an errand. The two go looking for her and see her speeding home. Geraldine arrives home smelling like gasoline and vomit and she is clearly in shock. Joe and Bazil take her to the hospital where Joe realizes his mother was raped. Police from multiple jurisdictions record statements from Geraldine and Bazil, and Joe is taken home by his aunt, Clemence.

A week later, Geraldine stays in bed, afraid to go outside. Joe, Bazil, and Clemence bring food for her. Geraldine refuses to tell any details about her rape or rapist, which causes her family stress. The following week, Joe and Bazil search through past case files in an effort to find a potential suspect. One case pertains to the adoption of a woman, Linda Lark, which Joe marks as potentially relevant to his mother's attack.

Joe and his friends take it upon themselves to investigate Geraldine's rape, which leads them to the round house where the incident took place. They find a gas canister and a pack of Hamm's beer, which they drink even though they realize the beer is potential evidence. The group theorizes that the rapist is Father Travis, a Catholic priest. However, their initial assumptions about Father Travis turn out to be wrong.

Later, Bazil takes Joe to talk to Linda Lark, and Linda speaks about her physical deformities and how she was abandoned by her birth parents because of them. Linda describes her twin brother, Linden Lark. Bazil marks Linden as a potential suspect. Meanwhile, Joe finds a doll containing a large sum of money near the lake, and entrusts the money to his Uncle Whitey's girlfriend Sonja, which she spends on herself despite having advised Joe to save it for his own education.

At the gas station, Joe works with Sonja and her husband, Whitey. Joe pumps gas for someone only to realize it's Linden Lark. Later that night, Whitey beats Sonja for suspicion that Sonja is cheating on him. Joe defends Sonja and quits his job at the gas station. After the incident, Joe goes to stay at Clemence's house where Mooshum tells him the story about Wiindigos.

Joe and his friends run into a church missionary group by the lake, and Cappy falls in love with one of the missionaries, Zelia. Joe goes home and asks Bazil the identity of Geraldine's rapist, but Bazil refuses to answer. Joe and his friend witness the recovery of the car of a woman named Mayla, a government secretary. Joe spots a fabric similar to the doll he found by the lake, and he begins to put the details together.

Joe blames his father for not handling the case properly, and Bazil tells Joe about the disadvantages of being a tribal judge. Despite his previous reserved and calm nature, when Bazil later sees Linden in a grocery store, he and Joe attack the suspect. However, Linden escapes. Bazil has a heart attack and is taken to a hospital. Joe plans to kill Linden himself.

Cappy joins Joe's plan to kill Linden, and they steal a rifle. Joe finds Linden and shoots him, but doesn't kill him. Cappy ultimately shoots and kills Linden. Joe and Cappy flee the scene, discarding the rifle under Linda Lark's porch. Joe returns for the rifle and Linda reveals she knows Joe killed Linden and explains why Linden raped Geraldine.

Cappy decides to travel to Montana where Zelia lives. Joe and his friends decide to join him and bring alcohol for the trip. Cappy crashes the car and dies. Angus and Zack are injured. At the end of the novel, Geraldine and Bazil bring Joe home.

== Themes ==
Jurisdiction of Tribal Law vs U.S. Federal and State Law

As reviewer Alden Mudge indicates, Indigenous reservation judicial law is a constant element in The Round House. Due to the fact that no one in the story can pinpoint where Geraldine's rape occurred — whether it happened on a patch of land under the jurisdiction of the federal government or on the grounds of the round house — the case becomes an issue of reservation versus state and federal government prosecution over crimes involving reservation residents.

Julie Tharp hints at the irony of Governor Curtis Yeltow trying to adopt Mayla's child after she is deceased. Curtis Yeltow, who is known to harbor racist views against Indigenous people, has an affair with his intern, Mayla, who is also underage. Yeltow attempting to adopt Mayla's child even through the child is biologically his, hints at how corrupt the federal government is when dealing with sexual abuse and misconduct against Indigenous women. Yeltow is more concerned with protecting his political power and ridicule for sleeping with an underaged girl and tries to cover up his crimes by 'adopting' Mayla's child.

Thomas Matchie outlines the implications of tribal law as the central conflict of the novel. He explains how because Geraldine's attacker was Linden, a white man who is not a recognized reservation resident, the novel acts as a potential commentary on the Supreme Court case Oliphant v. Suquamish Indian Tribe, which decided that tribal courts cannot prosecute non-Indigenous people who commit crimes on tribal land unless authorized by Congress. Bazil explains to Joe that being a tribal judge doesn't give him any judicial power over Geraldine's attacker, Linden, which leads to Joe and Cappy taking revenge on Linden by murdering him.

Sexual Violence against Indigenous Women

As Ron Charles explains in his review of the novel, Erdrich explores the difficulties Indigenous women face and how their struggles stem from misogynistic perceptions about sexuality, tribal identity, and gender. Geraldine's rape stems from the real-world phenomena that Indigenous women face on reservation lands in the late twentieth century as outlined by Sarah Deer. As Julie Tharp points out in a critical study of the novel, Indigenous women have a 2.5 times higher chance of experiencing sexual violence in their lifetimes than the general United States population and statistically, roughly 37 percent of Indigenous women may experience sexual assault in their lifetimes. After Geraldine is raped by Linden, she is too demoralized to complete her daily tasks and is bedridden for several weeks following the crime. Geraldine becomes a shadow of who she used to be, and when asked by Joe who her attacker was, she quickly dismisses him. As Erdrich noted in a piece for the New York Times, the demoralizing attitude Geraldine exhibits refers to the lack of judicial justice that will be delivered on her attacker, Linden, given that federal prosecutors decline to prosecute 67 percent of sexual abuse cases committed on tribal lands. Critics have noted how Linden, a white man who rapes Geraldine coincides with the reality that Indigenous women are far more likely to experience sexual violence from non-Indigenous men. Geraldine, Bazil, and Joe have little faith in the local judicial system in solving Geraldine's attack, which results in Joe searching out his mother's rapist himself.

Coming of Age and Manhood

Joe Coutts, who is the narrator of The Round House, is an adolescent teenager when the events of the novel take place. Joe is unaware of sexual violence and laws that prohibit tribal citizens from seeking justice. Julie Tharp explains how his mother's rape puts Joe in a difficult situation, as he is beginning to view women such as Sonja as sexual objects, but bears witness to his mother's misery from the hands of male sexual aggression. Joe is surrounded by male role models who exhibit different forms of masculinity, with some exhibiting sexual abuse towards women and others exemplifying leadership and restraint such as his father, Bazil. When Joe blackmails Sonja, she confronts Joe claiming he is no better than the other men she deals with. Joe rejected Whitey's abusive treatment of Sonja when he quit his gas station job, and as Tharp outlines, this incident forces Joe to consider a toxic cycle of misogyny. Joe's masculinity also comes into effect when he plans to kill Linden by preparing his plan of drawing him out on the golf course and murdering him for abusing his mother.

== Reception ==
The Round House won the National Book Award for Fiction in 2012, competing against the likes of Junot Díaz's This Is How You Lose Her and Kevin Powers's The Yellow Birds.

The novel was also included in The Oyster Review's list of "100 Best Books of the Decade So Far" in 2015. According to some of the most reputable literary critics, The Round House emerges as an emotional, deeply moving novel and one of Erdrich's best works. Ron Charles of The Washington Post focuses his review primarily on the protagonist, describing how "Joe is an incredibly endearing narrator, full of urgency and radiant candor." Charles concludes by noting that, "beyond the rape and the investigation and any possible retribution, Joe’s sobering evaluation of his relationship with his parents is the most profound drama of the novel." Molly Antopol of the San Francisco Chronicle praises the author's writing saying, "Erdrich's plotting is masterfully paced: the novel, particularly the second half, brims with so many action-packed scenes that the pages fly by. And yet the author also knows just when to slow down, reminding us that despite everything upending Joe's life, he's still just a teenager."

Despite being largely well-received, there are several negative criticisms of the novel as well. The New York Times critic Michiko Kakutani claims Erdrich's portrayal of a realistic criminal act in a reservation is too cartoony, especially when compared to her previous novel, The Plague of Doves, which Kakutani claims was more successful in portraying the shades of psychological grayness. She further delves into the fact that the main antagonist is one-dimensional and seems to be a stand-in for a more fleshed-out and developed villain. Another sharp criticism comes from The Boston Globe in a review stating that the novel is resolved quickly and abruptly shifts the plot toward its conclusion.

== Awards and honors ==
Year	Award	Category	Result	Ref.
2012	National Book Award	Fiction	Won	
2013	Alex Award	—	Won	
2013	American Book Award	—	Won	
2013	Andrew Carnegie Medals for Excellence	Fiction	Finalist	
2013	Dayton Literary Peace Prize	Fiction	Finalist	
2013	Indies Choice Book Awards	Adult Fiction	Won	
2013	Maine Readers' Choice Award	—	Longlisted	
2013	Minnesota Book Awards	Novel & Short Story	Won	
2014	International Dublin Literary Award	—	Longlisted	
2015	Nutmeg Book Award	High School	Nominated	

=== Other honors ===
- New York Times Notable Book in 2012
- Washington Post 50 Notable Works of Fiction

== Works cited ==
- Erdrich, Louise (2012). The Round House. New York: HarperCollins Publishers. ISBN 978-0-06-206524-7.
