= Lauren Markham =

American journalist and writer

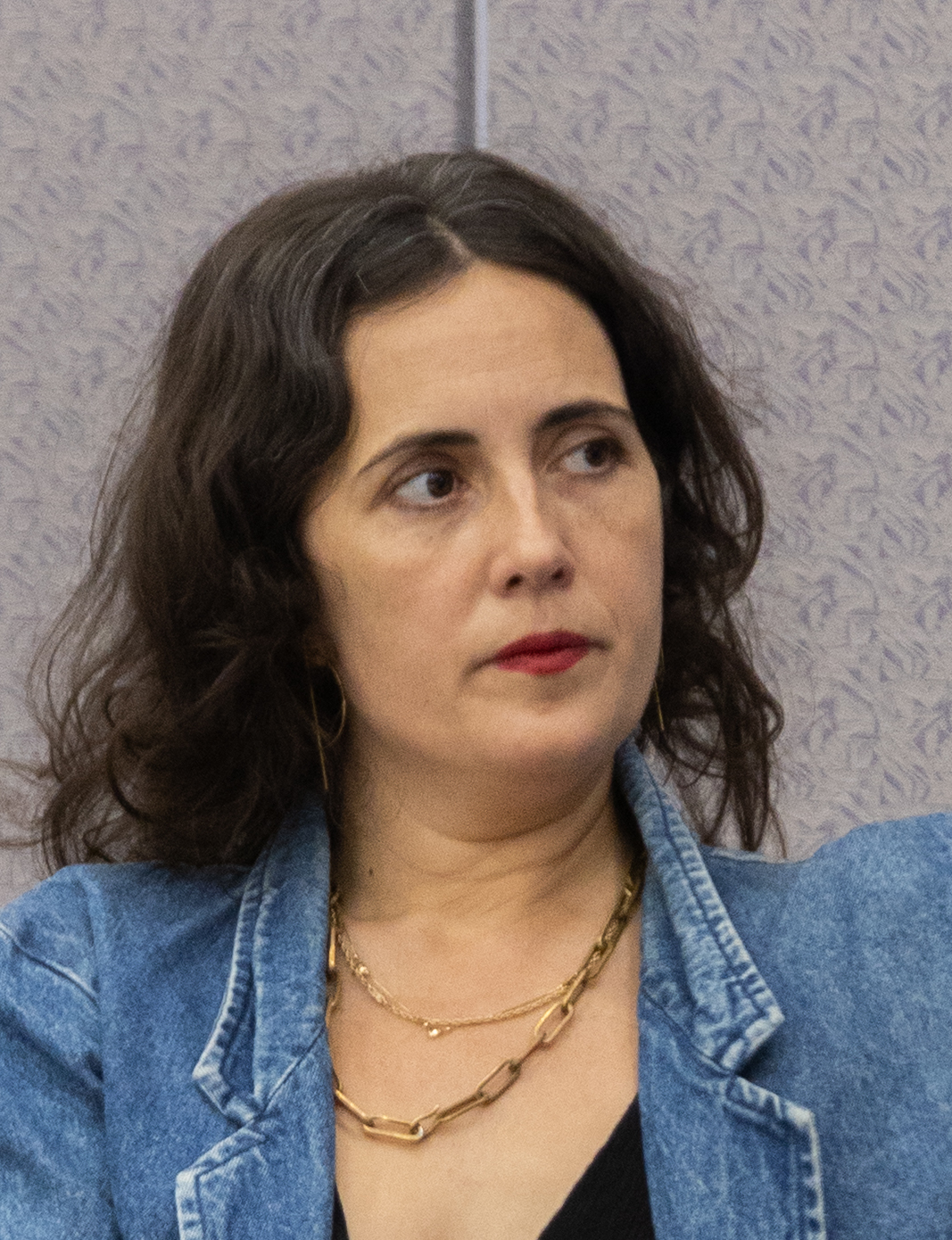
- Markham at AWP 2025
- Education: Vermont College of Fine Arts
- Occupations: Journalist, writer

Lauren Markham is an American journalist and writer.

Markham graduated from Middlebury College and received an M.F.A from Vermont College of Fine Arts. She was an editor at Virginia Quarterly Review and her work appeared in numerous magazines and journals, including The Atlantic and Mother Jones.

Markham teaches at St. Mary’s College of California, and the University of San Francisco. She is the author of The Far Away Brothers, A Map of Future Ruins, which was the runner-up for the 2025 Dayton Literary Peace Prize for non-fiction, and Immemorial.

== Works ==
- The Far Away Brothers: Two Young Migrants and the Making of an American Life, Crown, 2017.
- A Map of Future Ruins: On Borders and Belonging, Riverhead Books, 2024.
- Immemorial, Transit Books, 2025
