= The Arsonists' City =

2020 novel by Hala Alyan

The Arsonists' City is Hala Alyan's second novel, published by HarperCollins in 2020. The book structure follows the Nasr family into the past and the present repeatedly to unfold the intergenerational trauma caused by war and secrets passed down from parents to children.

== Plot ==
Idris Nasr, the new patriarch of the Nasr family after his father’s death, decides to sell his childhood home in Beirut, Lebanon. The matriarch of the family, Mazna Nasr dislikes the home in Beirut due to all the memories she had from her adolescence with Zakaria- Idris’ childhood friend- but despite this she asks for her children’s help to prevent Idris from selling the home.

In the present time, we follow the children of Mazna and Idris, who struggle deeply to assimilate to American culture as many children of migrants do. So much so that it was a factor as to why Naj, their youngest child, decided to move back to Beirut, despite having to stay closeted.

The family decides to go back to Idris' home in Beirut to hold a service for his father, in which during that time the book flips to the past, giving us a glimpse of the type of relationship Mazna, Zakaria, and Idris had during the civil war.

== Characters ==
- Mazna Nasr: Syrian-born theater actress who married her husband Idris Nasr after her lover Zakaria was murdered during the war. She is mother to Ava, Mimi, and Naj Nasr.
- Idris Nasr: Grew up in Beirut, Lebanon with Zakaria as his close childhood friend. After Zakaria's murder, he married Mazna and together moved to California so he could pursue his career in cardiac surgery.
- Zakaria: Met and became childhood friends with Idris because his mother was the housekeeper in Idris' childhood home. Zakaria and Mazna were lovers while it was known that Idris had feelings for Mazna. Zakaria was murdered during the civil war happening in Lebanon during the time.
- Ava Nasr: Struggles with assimilating into American culture as a child of migrants, it affects her identities as a wife to a white man, a respected professor, and as a Middle Eastern mother surrounded by rich white women who live in wealthy parts of New York City.
- Marwan "Mimi" Nasr: The only boy in the family, who is a struggling rock star in comparison to his younger sister Naj.
- Najla "Naj" Nasr: The youngest of the Nasr family, moved back to Beirut as a famous international musician who is a closeted lesbian due to the difference in culture between America and Lebanon.
