= Christy Lefteri =

English novelist and lecturer

- Born: Christy George Lefteri
- Education: Brunel University London
- Years active: 2009–present
- Children: 1

Christy George Lefteri is an English novelist. Her second novel, The Beekeeper of Aleppo (2019), became a Sunday Times bestseller and won the Aspen Words Literary Prize.

== Early life and education ==
Christy George Lefteri was born to Greek Cypriot refugee parents who met in London after fleeing the 1974 invasion; her paternal grandparents ran shops in Brixton and Tottenham. Lefteri grew up on estates in Islington and Edmonton before moving out to the suburbs.

She attended Southgate School. She went on to graduate with a Bachelor of Arts (BA) in English, and a Master of Arts (MA) and PhD in creative writing, all from Brunel University London, where she worked for some time as a lecturer. She then studied psychoanalysis.

== Career ==
Lefteri's debut novel, titled A Watermelon, a Fish and a Bible, was published via Quercus in April 2009. The novel is told from the perspectives of three different characters amid the Turkish invasion of Cyprus. A Watermelon, a Fish and a Bible was longlisted for the 2010 Edinburgh First Book Award and a 2012 Dublin Literary Award.

For six years, Lefteri worked as a psychotherapist at a central London hospital. In response to the Syrian civil war and refugee crisis in 2015, Lefteri felt compelled to help and volunteered at the Hope Centre in Athens, Greece, for two summers.

Inspired by her time in Athens, combined with her own parents' experiences, Lefteri returned to writing. In a six-way auction in 2018, Zaffre (a Bonnier Books imprint) acquired the rights to publish Lefteri's second novel The Beekeeper of Aleppo in May 2019. The novel follows the journey of two Syrian refugees named Nuri and Afra. The beekeeper Mustafa is based on Ryad Alsous, an academic at the University of York and formerly Damascus University. With over a million copies sold internationally as of 2023, The Beekeeper of Aleppo became The Sunday Times' third bestselling fiction paperback of 2020, made the Richard & Judy Book Club list, won the 2020 Aspen Words Literary Prize, and was runner-up for the Dayton Literary Peace Prize in the fiction category. In addition, the audiobook version, narrated by Art Malik, was shortlisted for a British Book Award.

In 2020, Manilla Press (another Bonnier Books imprint) acquired the rights to publish Lefteri's third novel Songbirds in July 2021. The novel is centered around the disappearance of a Sri Lankan domestic worker named Nisha, based on a real-life case of five migrant women and two children disappearing from Cyprus. Songbirds made The Sunday Times top 100 bestseller list of 2022.

Lefteri reunited with Manilla Press for her fourth novel The Book of Fire in August 2023. With the backdrop of forest wildfires on a Greek island, the novel deals with a family's trauma. Lefteri had witnessed the 2018 Attica wildfires firsthand.

== Adaptations ==
The Beekeeper of Aleppo was adapted for stage by Nesrin Alrefaai and Matthew Spangler. Directed by Miranda Cromwell and starring Roxy Faridany and Alfred Clay as Afra and Nuri respectively, the play had its world premiere in February 2023 at the Nottingham Playhouse. The production subsequently went on a UK and Ireland tour.

== Personal life ==
Lefteri has a daughter.

== Bibliography ==
=== Novels ===
- A Watermelon, a Fish and a Bible (2010)
- The Beekeeper of Aleppo (2019)
- Songbirds (2021)
- The Book of Fire (2023)
- The Library of Nicosia
