= Benjamin Skinner =

American writer (born 1976)

E. Benjamin Skinner (born May 4, 1976) is a writer on modern-day slavery and Founder and President of Transparentem.

== Career ==
Skinner began his career at the Council on Foreign Relations in New York City, where he focused on U.S. foreign policy. While at the Council in August 2001, he met veteran diplomat Richard C. Holbrooke. Skinner soon became "one of Holbrooke’s youngest protégés," and his Special Assistant for the next three years. Subsequently, he also worked for journalist David Halberstam and Gen. Stanley McChrystal (U.S. Army, Ret.). In 2003, while on assignment in Sudan for Newsweek International, Skinner met his first survivor of slavery.

As a writer, Skinner has infiltrated trafficking networks and slave quarries, urban child markets and illegal brothels, going undercover when necessary. His work has appeared in Time, Bloomberg Businessweek, Travel + Leisure, the Los Angeles Times, the Miami Herald and Foreign Affairs and Foreign Policy, among others.

The New York Times and The Boston Globe called Skinner's first book, A Crime So Monstrous, "devastating." The book was awarded the 2009 Dayton Literary Peace Prize for nonfiction, as well as a citation from the Overseas Press Club in its book category for 2008. He was also named one of National Geographic's Adventurers of the Year 2008. The book was published in Czech, German, Korean, Italian, and Polish translations. Chapters from the book have been adapted for an Emmy Award-winning episode of ABC's Nightline and for NBC's Law & Order.

Starting in 2009, Skinner was a Senior Fellow at the Schuster Institute for Investigative Journalism at Brandeis University, where he focused on tracing slavery in corporate supply chains from theaters like the New Zealand fishing industry and Indonesian palm oil plantations to U.S. and Chinese consumer markets. Previously, he was the first fellow for human trafficking at the Carr Center for Human Rights Policy at Harvard University's John F. Kennedy School of Government. In 2011, the World Economic Forum named Skinner one of its Young Global Leaders, and he formerly served on the Forum's Global Agenda Council on Illicit Trade. Skinner is a former senior vice president at Tau Investment Management.

== Personal ==
Skinner was raised in Wisconsin and northern Nigeria where his father served as a British colonial administrator. Skinner comes from a long line of abolitionists. His great-great-grandfather, Robert Pratt, served with the 1st Connecticut Artillery at the Siege of Petersburg, which led to Lee's surrender at Appomattox. Skinner received his bachelor's degree from Wesleyan University. He currently lives in Manhattan, NY.

== Bibliography ==
- Crimes of War 2.0: What The Public Should Know (Revised and Expanded) (Essay by Skinner, Editors Anthony Dworkin, Roy Gutman and David Rieff) (W.W. Norton & Company, 2007) ISBN 0393328465
- A Crime So Monstrous: Face-to-Face with Modern-Day Slavery (Free Press, 2008). ISBN 978-0-7432-9008-1
- The Unquiet American: Richard Holbrooke in the World (Essay by Skinner, Editors Derek Chollet and Samantha Power) (PublicAffairs, 2011) ISBN 1610390784
