= Nguyễn Phan Quế Mai =

Vietnamese poet and author

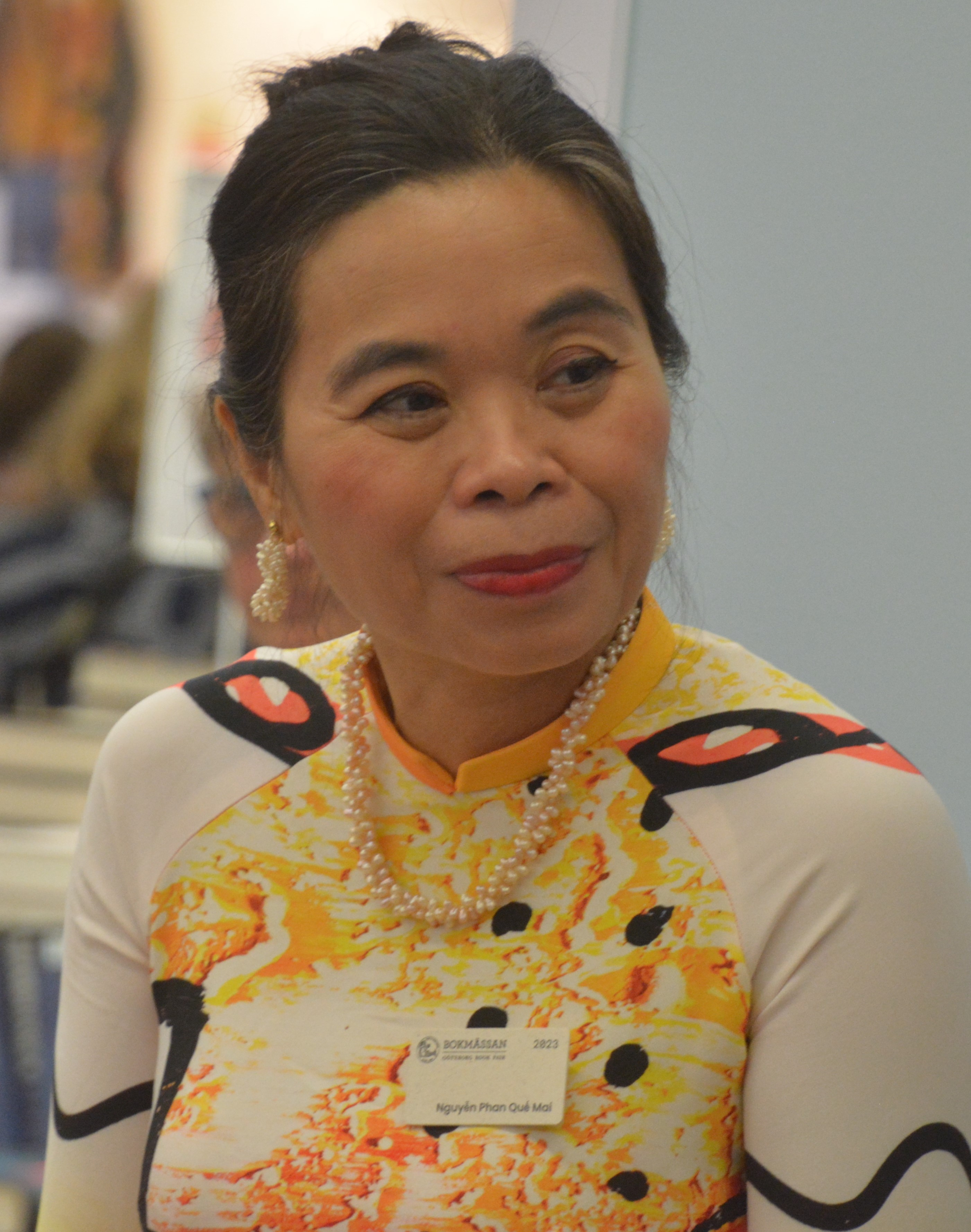
- Göteborg Book Fair in Sweden 2023

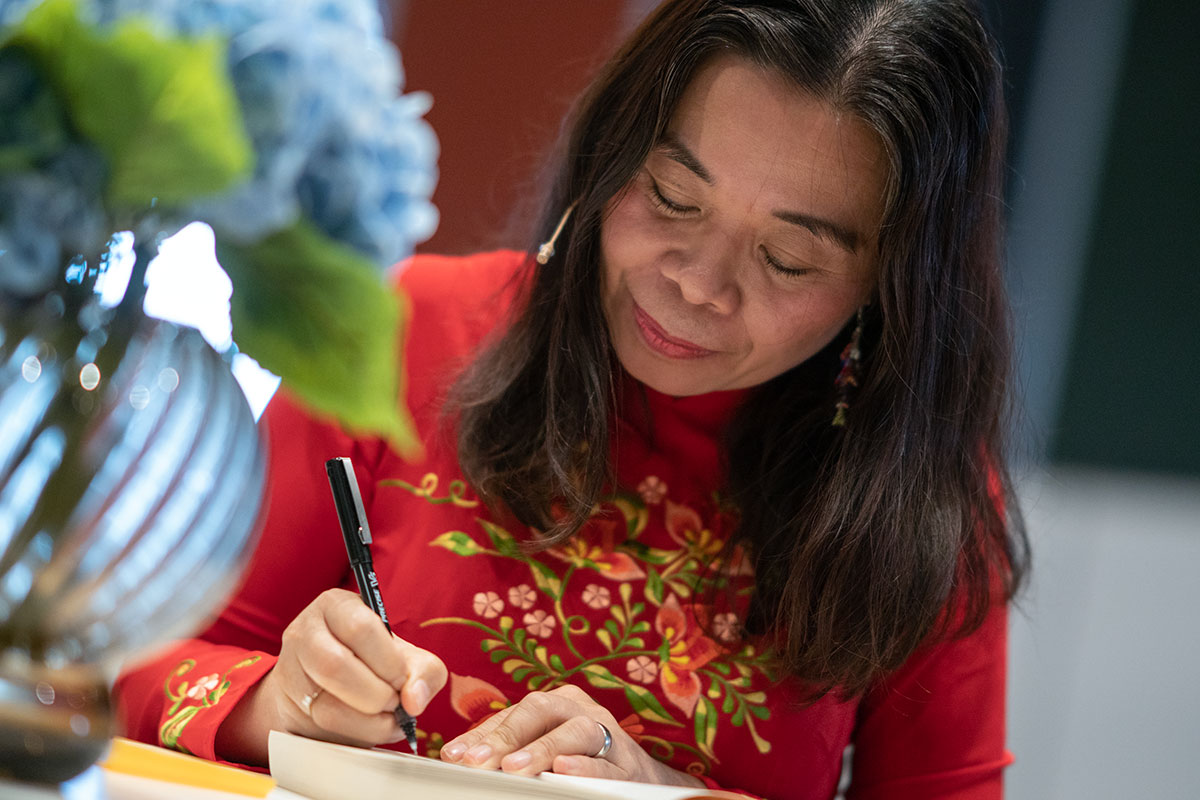
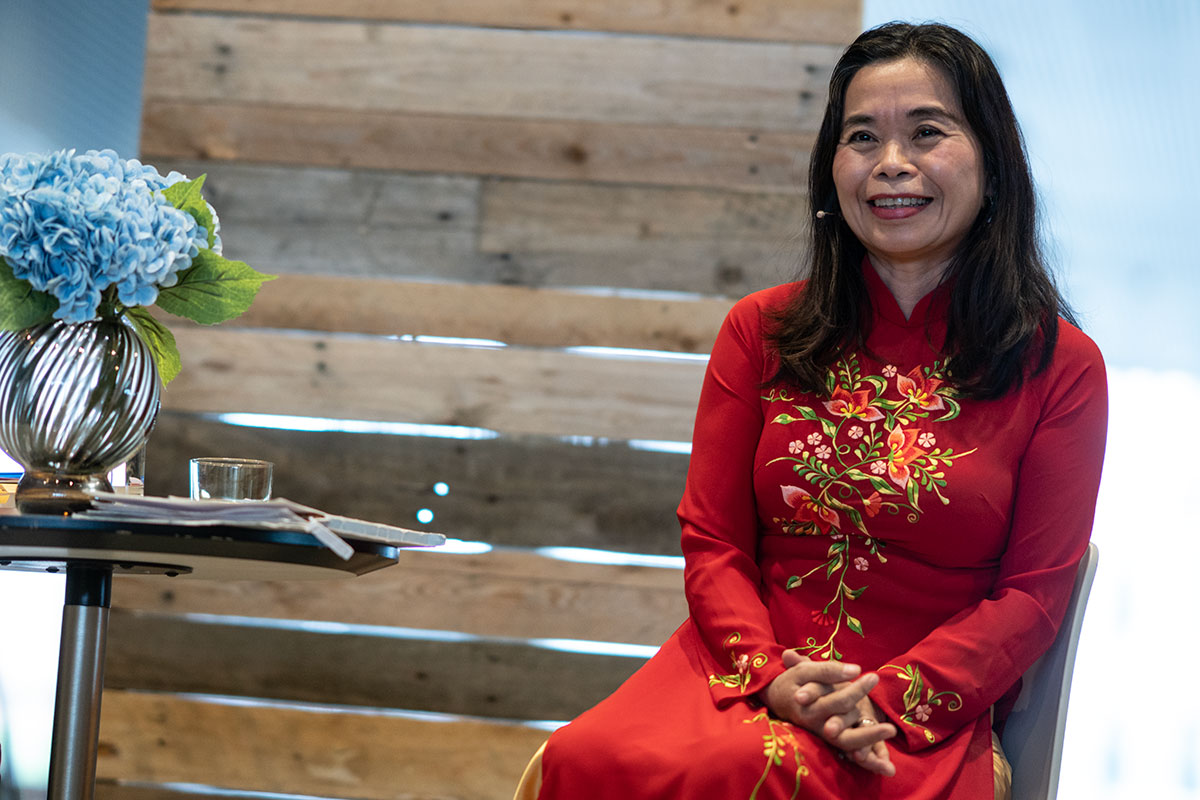
LiteratureXcange Festival in Aarhus (Denmark 2025)
Foto Hreinn Gudlaugsson

Nguyễn Phan Quế Mai (born August 12, 1973) is a Vietnamese poet and novelist. She is the author of twelve books of poetry, fiction and non-fiction in Vietnamese and English.

== Career ==
She started her writing career with poetry in Vietnamese and has been honored with some of the top literary awards in Vietnam including the Poetry of the Year 2010 Award from the Hanoi Writers Association, First Prize, the Poetry about 1,000 Years Hanoi, as well as the Capital's Arts & Literature Award. Her debut novel, and first book written in English, The Mountains Sing, was released in 2020. The novel is a fictional family saga that gives voice to rarely documented historical events. The book has become an international bestseller, and was runner-up for the 2021 Dayton Literary Peace Prize, winner of the 2020 BookBrowse Best Debut Award, the 2021 International Book Awards, the 2021 PEN Oakland/Josephine Miles Literary Award, and the 2020 Lannan Literary Award Fellowship for Fiction. Quế Mai's writing has been translated into twenty languages and has appeared in major publications including the New York Times. She has a PhD in Creative Writing from Lancaster University. She was named by Forbes Vietnam as one of 20 inspiring women of 2021. Her second novel written in English, Dust Child, was released in March 2023.

With Dust Child, Quế Mai continues to uncover rarely-told stories related to Vietnamese history. The novel centers on the Amerasian experience – children born to Vietnamese mothers and American military fathers. Like The Mountains Sing, Dust Child has received critical acclaim and has been voted as a best book of the year/month/season by many media establishments. The Boston Globe calls it "an exquisite novel". The Dust Child has been nominated for the Dayton Literary Peace Prize 2024 out of six novels.
