= Eugenia Kim (author) =

Korean American writer and novelist (born 1952)

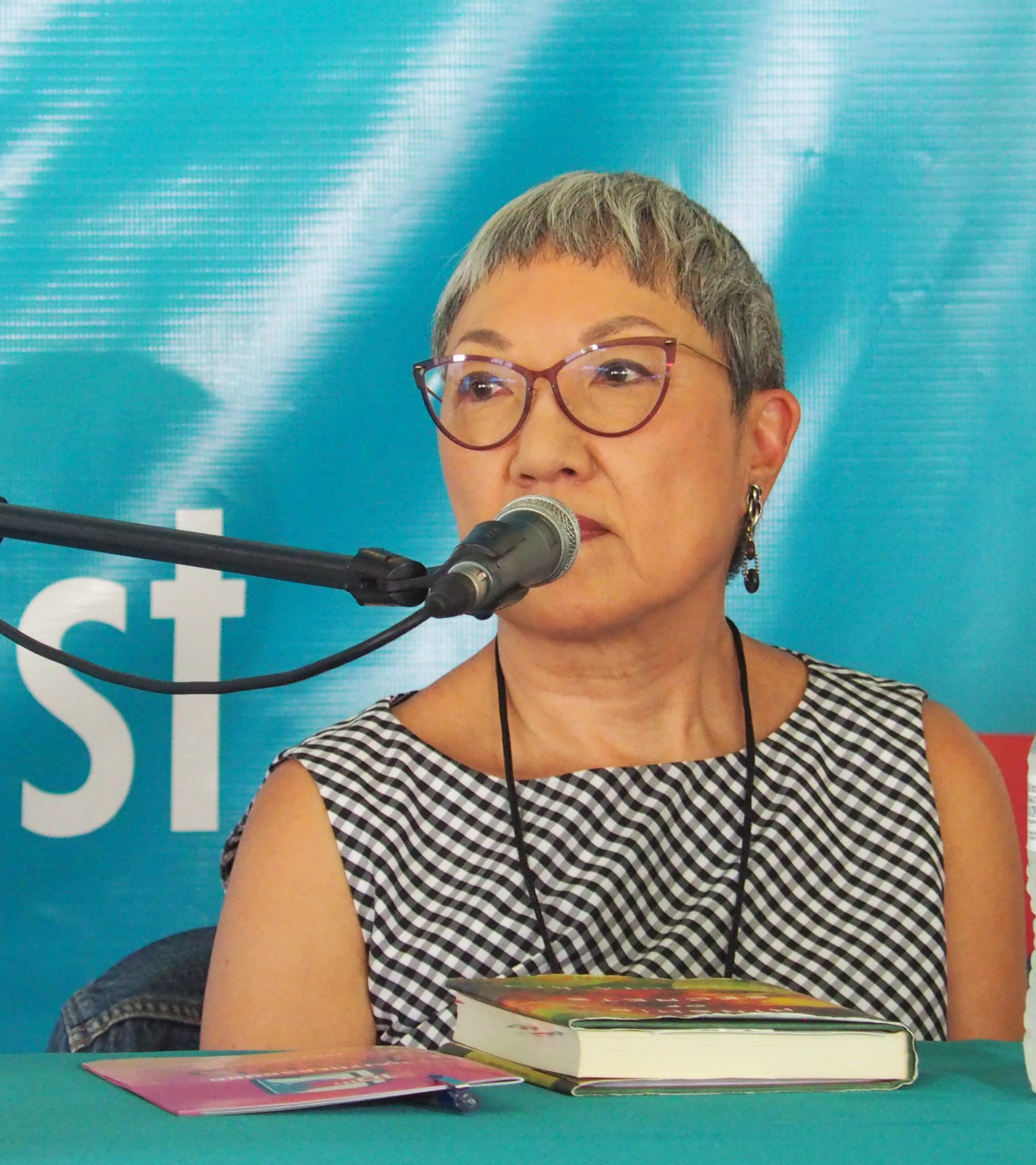
- Korean American writer and novelist
- Born: 1952 (age 73–74); White Plains, New York, U.S.
- Education: University of Maryland (BA in Studio Art); Bennington College (MFA in Writing and Literature)
- Writing career
- Language: English
- Genre: Historical fiction
- Notable works: The Calligrapher's Daughter (2009); The Kinship of Secrets (2018)
- Notable awards: Borders Original Voices Award 2009

Eugenia Kim (born 1952) is a Korean American writer and novelist who lives in Washington, D.C. She is most known for her debut novel, The Calligrapher's Daughter (2008), which was critically acclaimed and won multiple awards, including the 2009 Borders Original Voices Award for Fiction. Kim teaches at Fairfield University's MFA Creative Writing program.

== Early life ==
The daughter of Korean immigrant parents who came to America shortly after the Pacific War, Kim was born in White Plains, New York and raised in Takoma Park, Maryland. She attended Central Connecticut State University (then College), and the University of Maryland, College Park, from which she received a BA in Studio Art. Following a long career in graphic design, she received her MFA in Writing and Literature from Bennington College in 2001.

== Works ==
Kim's debut novel, The Calligrapher's Daughter, was released in the United States in 2008 by Henry Holt. It received a Publishers Weekly starred review among other advance reviews. It was also published by Bloomsbury in the United Kingdom in January 2010, and has been translated into other languages so as to be published in Indonesia and South Korea. Kim's epic historical novel, inspired by the life of her mother, is about a young woman who fights for a brighter future in early 20th-century Korea during the Japanese occupation. In addition to other press attention, including a less favorable review by the Smithsonian BookDragon, The Calligrapher's Daughter was named Critic's Pick and a Best Book of 2009 by The Washington Post, and was a September 2009 Book Pick in Good Housekeeping magazine.

The Calligrapher's Daughter won the 2009 Borders Original Voices Award for Fiction and was shortlisted for the 2010 Dayton Literary Peace Prize.

Her stories and essays were published by Potomac Review, APAJ (the former literary journal of the Asian American Writers' Workshop), Our Bodies, Ourselves (2005 edition) and in anthologies, including Echoes Upon Echoes: New Korean American Writing, edited by Elaine H. Kim and Hyun Yi Kang. Her short story "Orientation" was first runner-up in the 2001 F. Scott Fitzgerald Short Story Contest.

Kim's second novel, The Kinship of Secrets, was published by Houghton Mifflin Harcourt in November 2018.

== Other work ==
In May, 2010, Kim presented at the American Studies Association of Korea, at the invitation of the Embassy of the United States, Seoul, and at Sookmyung Women's University Library as part of an exhibition, "A Glimpse into the World of Korean American Literature". She has presented at the Library of Congress Asian American Association, the American Library Association, and elsewhere.

She teaches fiction at Fairfield University's MFA Creative Writing Program.

== Awards ==
=== Literary awards ===
- 2009 Borders Original Voices Award for Fiction
- 2010 Dayton Literary Peace Prize shortlist
- 2019 New American Voices Award finalist for The Kinship of Secrets

=== Honors ===
- Mid Atlantic Arts Foundation Fellow, Millay Colony for the Arts
- Eli Cantor Fellow, Yaddo
- Fellow, Hedgebrook
- Stanford Calderwood Fellow, MacDowell Colony
- Fellow, Virginia Center for the Creative Arts

== Bibliography ==
- The Calligrapher's Daughter. New York: Henry Holt and Company. 2009. pp. 386. ISBN 978-0-8050-8912-7.
- The Kinship of Secrets (2018)
