= The Beekeeper of Aleppo =

2019 novel by Christy Lefteri

- The cover of the first edition of The Beekeeper of Aleppo, published in May 2019
- Author: Christy Lefteri
- Audio read by: Art Malik
- Language: English
- Publisher: Zaffre
- Pages: 378
- Awards: Aspen Words Literary Prize
- ISBN: 978-1-78576-893-4
- Website: https://www.beekeeperofaleppo.com

The Beekeeper of Aleppo is a 2019 novel by English writer Christy Lefteri. Its characters are Syrian refugees who leave the country in 2015 and travel through Europe with the aim of finding sanctuary in the UK.

== Background ==
The Beekeeper of Aleppo is a novel drawn from the author's experience over two summers volunteering in Athens, Greece, at a refugee centre run by the NGO Faros. It deals with the plight of refugees from Syria to Europe during the Syrian Revolution in 2015. It is Lefteri's second novel.

The character of beekeeper Mustafa is based on Ryad Alsous, an academic at the University of York and formerly Damascus University.

== Synopsis ==
The story is told by a Syrian man from Aleppo, Nuri, who before the revolution was a beekeeper who worked with his friend Mustafa. The novel tells the story of the journey travelled by Nuri and his wife Afra, who leave Syria after Nuri is threatened by the police. Mustafa has already managed to get to safety in England.

== Publication ==
In a six-way auction in 2018, Zaffre (a Bonnier Books imprint) acquired the rights to publish The Beekeeper of Aleppo in May 2019.

== Reception and awards ==
With over a million copies sold internationally as of 2023, The Beekeeper of Aleppo became The Sunday Times' third bestselling fiction paperback of 2020, and made the Richard & Judy Book Club list.

The novel won the 2020 Aspen Words Literary Prize and was runner-up for the Dayton Literary Peace Prize in the fiction category.

The audiobook version, narrated by Art Malik, was shortlisted for a British Book Award in 2020.

== Stage adaptation ==
In 2023, Nesrin Alrefaai and Matthew Spangler adapted the story for stage. UK Productions staged the production at various locations in the UK, including Nottingham Playhouse. Reviewing the play for The Guardian, Anya Ryan said the story was powerful, but thought that there was "a stiffness and sense of detachment to the staging".
