= LaRose (novel) =

2016 novel by Louise Erdrich

- First edition cover, 2016
- Author: Louise Erdrich
- Cover artist: Aza Erdrich
- Language: English
- Series: Justice #3
- Genre: Literary fiction
- Publisher: HarperCollins
- Publication date: May 10, 2016
- Publication place: United States
- Media type: Print (hardcover, paperback)
- Pages: 384 pp (hardcover 1st ed.)
- ISBN: 9780062277022 (hardcover 1st ed.)
- OCLC: 918994415
- Dewey Decimal: 813/.54
- LC Class: PS3555.R42 L37 2016
- Preceded by: The Round House
- Website: Official website

LaRose is a novel by the Ojibwe author Louise Erdrich, published in 2016 by HarperCollins. The novel features the same setting as Erdrich's 2012 novel The Round House. The book received positive reviews from literary publications. It won the 2016 National Book Critics Circle Award for Fiction.

== Plot summary ==
LaRose is set in North Dakota on an Ojibwe reservation in the "era of George W. Bush and 9/11." The novel's protagonist is LaRose Iron, a young Native American boy. His father, Landreaux Iron, accidentally shoots LaRose's best friend and neighbor, Dusty Ravich, also 5 years old, in a hunting accident, when the buck Landreaux had aimed at suddenly moved from in front of the boy.

Dusty's parents, Peter and Nola, are devastated by his death. To compensate for their loss, following an ancient custom, LaRose's parents, Landreaux and Emmaline, give him to Dusty's family after speaking with a priest and visiting a sweat lodge, to find a way to resolve their guilt.

While Peter and Nola are initially reluctant to accept LaRose into their family, perceiving it as an act of betrayal towards their own dead son, they soon warm to him. LaRose later helps protect Nola as she deals with suicidal ideation.

The story also introduces the stories of several of LaRose's ancestors, who were sent to residential schools and endured many traumatic experiences. The first person in the family to be named LaRose, an Ojibwe woman, was a young girl in 1839 when her mother sold her at a trading post. She is raped and later participates in the murder of her rapist. After her death, her remains are stolen by white "scientists".

== Critical reception ==
It received positive reviews from The New York Times, The Kansas City Star, Winnipeg Free Press, The Philadelphia Inquirer, The Washington Post, The A.V. Club, The Sydney Morning Herald, USA Today, and The Chronicle Herald.

USA Today gave it 3.5 out of 4 stars, while The Sydney Morning Herald described it as a "page-turner," The Kansas City Star described it as "brutally beautiful," and The A.V. Club described it as "everything you want a novel to be." LaRose was described by The Washington Post as a "masterly tale of grief and love" and by The Philadelphia Inquirer as a "brilliant, subtle exploration of tragic histories."

== Awards and honors ==
Year	Award	Category	Result	Ref.
2016	International Dublin Literary Award	—	Longlisted	
2016	National Book Critics Circle Award	Fiction	Won	
2017	Andrew Carnegie Medals for Excellence	Fiction	Longlisted	
2017	Audie Award	Literary Fiction & Classics	Shortlisted	
2017	Indies Choice Book Awards	Adult Fiction, Debut	Shortlisted	
2017	Minnesota Book Awards	Novel & Short Story	Shortlisted	
2017	PEN/Faulkner Award for Fiction	—	Finalist	
2017	Society of Midland Authors Award	Adult Fiction	Longlisted	
