= Hala Alyan =

Palestinian-American writer (born 1986)

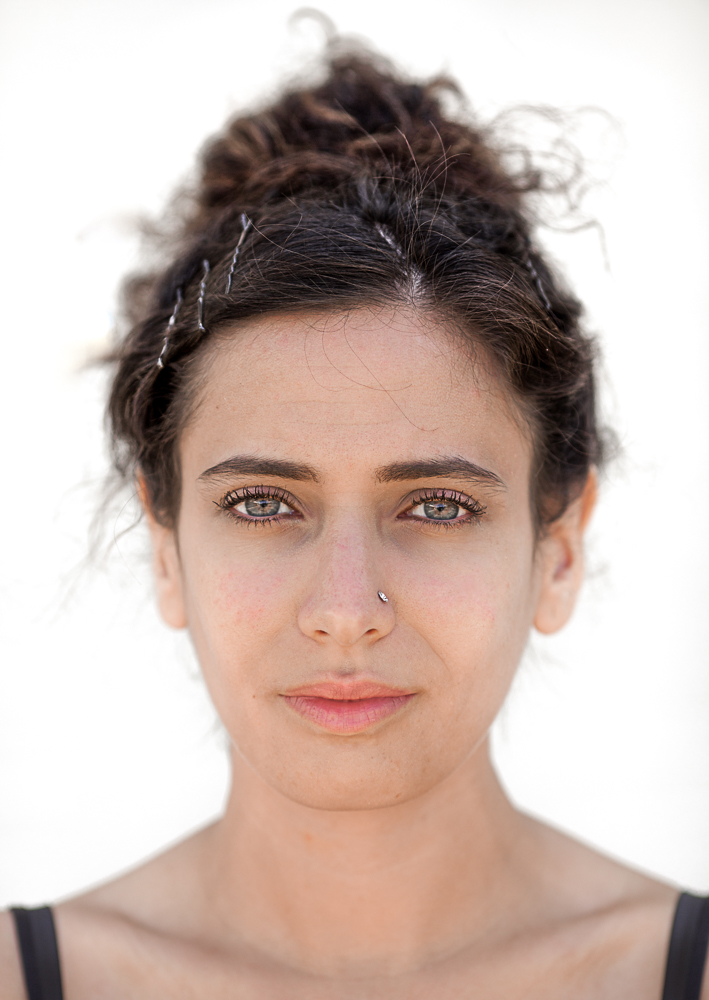
- Alyan in 2019
- Born: July 27, 1986 (age 40); Carbondale, Illinois, U.S.
- Education: American University of Beirut; Columbia University; Rutgers University
- Occupations: Poet; Novelist; Clinical psychologist
- Notable work: Salt Houses; The Arsonists' City; I'll Tell You When I'm Home
- Awards: Arab American Book Award (2013); Dayton Literary Peace Prize (2018); GLCA New Writers Award (2026); National Book Critics Circle Award (Autobiography longlist, 2025)
- Website: www.halaalyan.com

Hala Alyan (Arabic: هَلَا عَلْيَان, romanized: Ḥalā ʿAlyān; born July 27, 1986) is a Palestinian-American writer, poet, and clinical psychologist specializing in trauma, addiction, and cross-cultural behavior. She is the author of the novels Salt Houses (2017) and The Arsonists' City (2021), the memoir I'll Tell You When I'm Home (2025), and five poetry collections.

Alyan's honors include an Arab American Book Award in 2013 and the Dayton Literary Peace Prize in 2018. Her memoir I'll Tell You When I'm Home won the GLCA New Writers Award for creative nonfiction in 2026 and was longlisted for the 2025 National Book Critics Circle Award. The book was a finalist for the 2026 Pulitzer Prize.

== Early life and career ==
Hala Alyan was born in Carbondale, Illinois, on July 27, 1986. Her family lived in Kuwait after her birth but sought political asylum in the United States when Iraqi forces invaded the country.

She graduated from the American University of Beirut and from Columbia University. She received her doctorate in clinical psychology at Rutgers University and is a Clinical Assistant Professor of Applied Psychology at New York University. She and her husband live in Brooklyn, New York.

== Awards and works ==
Alyan's work has been published in a range of journals and literary magazines, including The New Yorker, the Academy of American Poets, Guernica, and Jewish Currents, among others. Examples of her poems published online include "Meals" (The Missouri Review) and "Honeymoon" (Poetry).

In her first novel, Salt Houses, Alyan follows multiple generations of the fictional Yacoub family, tracing their lives across decades and major regional upheavals, including displacement following the Six-Day War of 1967 and later disruption during the 1990 Gulf War.

In 2018, Alyan's novel Salt Houses won the Arab American Book Award (Adult fiction) presented by the Arab American National Museum. That year, she also won the Dayton Literary Peace Prize, and in the fall she was a visiting fellow at the American Library in Paris.

Her second novel, The Arsonists' City, was published by Houghton Mifflin Harcourt on March 9, 2021, and received positive reviews.

In 2026, Alyan won the GLCA New Writers Award for creative nonfiction for her memoir I’ll Tell You When I’m Home, which was longlisted for the 2025 National Book Critics Circle Award for Autobiography. It was a finalist for the 2026 Pulitzer Prize for Memoir or Autobiography.

In 2013, Alyan won the Arab American Book Award for poetry for her first full-length poetry collection Atrium: Poems.

== Bibliography ==
=== Novels ===
- Salt Houses. Houghton Mifflin Harcourt. 2017. ISBN 9781328915856.
- The Arsonists' City. HarperCollins. 2021. ISBN 9780358126553.

=== Memoir ===
- I'll Tell You When I'm Home. New York: Simon and Schuster. June 3, 2025. ISBN 978-1-9821-8258-8.

=== Poetry ===
Collections

- Atrium (2005)
- Four Cities (2015)
- Hijra (2016)
- The Twenty-Ninth Year (2019)
- The Moon That Turns You Back (2024)

Anthologies

- We Call to the Eye & the Night: Love Poems by Writers of Arab Heritage (2023) edited by Hala Alyan & Zeina Hashem Beck

=== Essays ===
- "'I am not there and I am not here': a Palestinian American poet on bearing witness to atrocity" in The Guardian (January 28, 2024)
- "The Power of Changing Your Mind" in TIME (January 17, 2024)
- "What a Palestinian-American Wants You To Know about Dehumanization" in Teen Vogue (December 20, 2023)
- If Palestinian Freedom Makes You Uneasy, Ask Yourself Why" in The New York Times (November 1, 2023)
- "The Palestine Double Standard" in The New York Times (October 25, 2023)
- A Letter to My Husband" in Emergency Magazine (January 21, 2019)
- "In Dust," essay appearing in Being Palestinian: Personal Reflections on Palestinian Identity in the Diaspora, edited by Yasir Suleiman (2016)
