= Toreadors from Vasyukivka =

1973 children's novel by Vsevolod Nestaiko

- Cover of the Russian-language translation of the book
- Author: Vsevolod Nestayko
- Original title: Тореадори з Васюківки
- Language: Ukrainian
- Genre: Novel
- Published: 1972

Toreadors from Vasyukivka (Ukrainian: Тореадори з Васюківки; Bullfighters from Vasyukivka) is a humorous three-part children's novel written between 1963 and 1970 by the Ukrainian writer Vsevolod Nestayko. The book is considered one of the most prominent children's novels in contemporary Ukrainian literature and was translated in over 20 languages.

== Plot ==
The novel consists of three episodes (published as separate stories): “The Adventures of Robinson Kukuruzo” (Ukrainian: «Пригоди Робінзона Кукурузо»), “The Stranger from Apartment Thirteen” (Ukrainian: «Незнайомець із тринадцятої квартири») and “The Secret of the Three Unknowns” (Ukrainian: «Таємниця трьох невідомих»). Each episode has its own logical narrative, connected to the other ones only through the main characters.

The main characters of the book are Ukrainian schoolboys from the village of Vasyukivka – Pavlusha Zavgorodniy (in early editions – Kryvorotko) and Yava (Ivan) Ren. The brave Yava and the more calm and reasonable Pavlusha are united by a sincere desire to become famous throughout the world. To achieve this, throughout the trilogy they attempt to become toreadors, catch foreign spies in their village, conquer Kyiv, and many other adventures. The main message of the book is true friendship, self-sacrifice, and readiness to help someone in need.

== History ==
According to the author: “Vasyl Evdokimenko, an artist who designed my books, once told me a story about students who got lost in a cornfield and managed to get out only when the radio on a pole in the village went on. That's how I wrote the story 'Adventure in the Cornfield,' where Yava and Pavlusha, the protagonists of the entire trilogy 'Toreadors from Vasyukivka,' appeared for the first time”.

The first story in the trilogy was published in 1964, and the whole novel appeared as one book in 1972. After the Soviet Union collapse, the book was republished in a new edition, where the author removed the ideological Soviet layers, removed some outdated details that are incomprehensible to the modern reader, and added new storylines.

The book was translated in over 20 languages and is part of school curriculum in Ukraine.

== Film adaptation ==
In 1965, the Kharkiv Television Studio shot an eponymous film based on the book's first episode. The film adaptation was successful not only in the USSR, but also at foreign film festivals. The adaptation received multiple awards: Grand Prize at the International Film Festival in Munich (1968), the main prize at the International Film Festival in Austria and the main prize at the International Festival in Alexandria (Australia, 1969).

A new film adaptation was announced in 2024.
