= Ben Rawlence =

British writer

Ben Rawlence is a British writer who has written five books: The River in the Sea: The Ocean Current That Made the World As We Know It (2027), Think Like A Forest: Letters to My Children From a Changing Planet (2026), The Treeline: The Last Forest and The Future of Life on Earth (2022), Radio Congo: Signals of Hope From Africa's Deadliest War (2012) and City of Thorns: Nine Lives in the World's Largest Refugee Camp (2016). From 2006 to 2013, he was a researcher for Human Rights Watch's Africa division. Rawlence has also written for The New York Times, The Guardian and London Review of Books. He lives in the Black Mountains, Wales, where he is the founding director of Black Mountains College, an institution devoted to creative and adaptive thinking in the face of the climate and ecological emergency.

== Education ==
Rawlence attended Bishop Wordsworth's Grammar School in Salisbury, Wiltshire. He later studied at the School of Oriental and African Studies at the University of London, where he gained a BA degree in Swahili and History, and the University of Chicago, where he gained an MA in international relations.

== Life and work ==
From 2000 to 2002, Rawlence worked at the Social Science Research Council in the USA coordinating the Global Security and Cooperation Program, a field-building programme funded by the MacArthur Foundation focused on the challenge of re-defining international relations in terms of human security rather than great power rivalry. This was at a time of the end of the Cold War but before 9/11 and the commencement of the 'War on Terror'. At the SSRC, Rawlence conceived and proposed the founding of a new research agenda on International Law and International Relations that led to a major initiative of workshops and the publication of an edited volume: International Law and International Relations: Bridging Theory and Practice (Routledge, 2007), edited by Thomas Biersteker, Peter J. Spiro and Chandra Lekha Sriram.

From 2002-2004, Rawlence served as foreign affairs special adviser to Sir Menzies Campbell and Charles Kennedy of the Liberal Democrats in the UK Parliament. His covered the launching of the Iraq war (2003). Whilst there he contributed to key parliamentary research on arms exports licenses, the legality of the war in Iraq, Ministry of Defence procurement failures regarding kit and equipment for personnel, the auditing of the major projects procurement pipeline, arms sales to Saudi Arabia, the US-UK extradition treaty among others.

In 2005 Rawlence assisted the Civic United Front in Tanzania with their election campaign which resulted in a disputed result and widespread human rights abuses that Rawlence documented for the party and in an article for African Affairs. The campaign famously included a plan for 'people's power', a popular uprising that was to be enacted should the election be stolen as expected. In the event, the party's leadership did not activate the plan due to fears that any protests would be violently suppressed.

From 2006 to 2013, Rawlence was a researcher for Human Rights Watch (HRW) in its Africa division, covering at different times the Horn of Africa, Kenya, Nigeria, Uganda, and Zanzibar.

His work in Kenya in 2008 covering the post-election violence there (Ballots to Bullets) contributed to the cases brought by the ICC against the political leaders Jomo Kenyatta and William Ruto.

In 2009-10 Rawlence worked undercover in Ethiopia documenting the politicisation of development aid from the World Bank and the UK. This led to groundbreaking research published by Human Rights Watch, Development Without Freedom: How Aid Underwrites Repression in Ethiopia. The research kick-started an internal review by the World Bank of its human rights policies and aid to Ethiopia and culminated in a judicial review in the UK of bilateral and multilateral development aid to Ethiopia. Pre-empting the judicial review about the mis-use of its funds, in 2015 the then UK Department of International Development cancelled its main aid programme to Ethiopia, citing concerns about human rights.

From 2013, Rawlence returned to the UK, settling in Wales where he co-founded (with Owen Sheers) a new kind of educational institution for the climate emergency, Black Mountains College. He has been the founding CEO of Black Mountains College since 2018, launching the college's teaching programmes with sixteen students in 2021 and overseeing fundraising and investment of more than £12 million with total student enrolments rising to 145 in 2026.

== Books ==
=== Radio Congo ===
Whilst working for Human Rights Watch, Rawlence undertook an expedition around the war zone of Eastern Congo, traveling for four months on foot, bicycle, canoe and motorbike interviewing inhabitants, combatants, missionaries and diplomats for his first book, Radio Congo: Signals of Hope From Africa's Deadliest War (2012). The book is concerned with restoring the balance in reporting about Africa, focusing more on hopeful stories of how people are living and surviving rather than how they are dying in eastern Democratic Republic of the Congo.

=== City of Thorns ===
In 2010, while working for Human Rights Watch, Rawlence visited the refugee camp complex of Dadaab on the eastern Kenyan border with Somalia, then home to around 300,000 people. In 2011 he returned for the first of seven long visits over four years. Building on his years of research conducted for Human Rights Watch, he interviewed young Somali refugees living there, and saw the camp, which already was the largest refugee settlement in the world, grow further. His resulting book, City of Thorns: Nine Lives in the World's Largest Refugee Camp (2016), alternates between portraits of these residents and "big-picture accounts of the regional turmoil that drove them there ... and continues to shape their lives". The book received positive reviews in the Los Angeles Times, The Economist, and by one reviewer in The New York Times, The book won the youth award of the Ryzard Kapucinski Prize, and was shortlsted for the Los Angeles Times Book Award, the German Kultupreis, and the Ryzard Kapucinski Award in Poland.

=== The Treeline ===
The Treeline: The Last Forest and the Future of Life on Earth, was published by Jonathan Cape in the UK and St. Martin's Press in the USA, in 2022. It documents a journey around the Arctic Circle examining how the boreal forest is responding to warming. Each chapter deals with a different species of tree, examining how the treeline in each place came to be formed over millennia, what the current ecosystem looks like and how earth systems are changing the prospects for the forest as well as the people who live within it. It is a sweeping travel book as well as journey of science and wonder.

The Treeline won the New York Public Library's Helen Bernstein Award for Excellence in Journalism in 2023 and the Eric and Wendy Schmidt / National Academies of Science, Engineering and Medicine Top Prize Award for Science Communication in 2022. It was shortlisted for the Wainwright Prize for Conservation Writing among others.

Longlisted for the American Library Association's 2023 Carnegie Medal for Excellence in Nonfiction, Finalist, 2023 Banff Mountain Book Competition, Finalist, 2023 Dayton Literary Peace Prize.

=== Think Like A Forest ===
Starting in 2012, Rawlence began writing letters to his unborn daughter. Continuing over the following decade, he wrote to both his daughters about his fears around climate change and how to communicate these. The resulting collection of letters discuss not only climate but psychology, protest, politics and the challenges of raising children at a time of rapid discontinuous change. These were published as Think Like A Forest: Letters to My Children From a Changing Planet in 2026.

=== The River In The Sea ===
The sequel to The Treeline, The River In The Sea: The Ocean Current That Made the World As We Know It, is published in 2027. It is a geographic journey from the origins of the Gulf Stream system - the Atlantic Meridional Overturning Circulation - in Panama to the Gulf of Mexico, following the current across the Atlantic to Europe. In a series of chapters along the route of the current, Rawlence examines the effect of pollution and ocean change on the ecosystems and creatures that call the current home. He considers copepods and zooplankton, coral in Cuba, North Atlantic Right Whales, eels, herring, Northern bottlenose whales and sponges. The journey takes the reader from the Caribbean to the fjords of Norway and the whirlpools of Svalbard and then back down along the seafloor to the Azores on the Mid Atlantic Ridge. The book wrestles with the question "what's going to happen?" in the event of the collapse of the ocean circulation which is increasingly feared by scientists. It presents the latest findings on the prospects for the current and considers how to live in the shadow of this threat.

In addition to these books, Rawlence has written for a range of publications including The New York Times, The Guardian, The Telegraph, The New York Times Book Review, The New Yorker, Dark Mountain Project, Granta, Prospect Magazine, Monocle and The London Review of Books.

== Publications ==
=== Publications by Rawlence ===
- The Bullets Were Raining: The January 2001 Attach on Peaceful Demonstrators in Zanzibar, April 10, 2002
- Briefing: The Zanzibar Election, African Affairs, Vol 104, Issue 416, July 2005
- In Hope And Fear: Uganda's Presidential and Parliamentary Polls, February, 2006
- Election or Selection: Human Rights Abuse and Threats to Free and Fair Elections in Nigeria, April 4, 2007
- Briefing: Nigeria's 2007 General Elections, Democracy in Retreat, African Affairs, Vol 106. No. 424, 2007
- Criminal Politics: Violence, "Godfathers" and Corruption in Nigeria, October 11, 2007
- Ballots to Bullets: Organised Political Violence and Kenya's Crisis of Governance, Human Rights Watch, March 16, 2008,
- Collective Punishment: War Crimes and Crimes Against Humanity in the Ogaden area of Ethiopia's Somali Region, June 12, 2008
- All The Men Have Gone: War Crimes in Kenya's Mt Conflict, Human Rights Watch, July 27, 2008
- Bring the Gun Or You'll Die: Torture, Rape and Other Serious Human Rights Violations by Kenyan Security Forces in the Triangle, Human Rights Watch, June 29, 2009
- Hostages to Peace: Threats to Human Rights and Democracy in Somaliland, July 13, 2009
- One Hundred Ways of Putting Pressure: Violations of Freedom of Expression and Association in Ethiopia, March 24, 2010
- Hold Your Heart: Waiting for Justice in Kenya's Mt. Elgon Region, Human Rights Watch, October 27, 2011
- Development Without Freedom: How Aid Underwrites Repression in Ethiopia, October 19, 2010.
- You Don't Know Who to Blame: War Crimes in Somalia, August 14, 2011
- No Place for Children: Child Recruitment, Forced Marriage and Attacks on Schools in Somalia, February 20, 2012
- Hostages of the Gatekeepers: Abuses Against Internally Displaced in Mogadishu, March 28, 2013
- Radio Congo: Signals of Hope From Africa's Deadliest War.
  - London: OneWorld, 2013. ISBN 9781851689651.
  - Radio Congo: Voyage au Cœur du Congo des Africains. Paris: Globe, 2014. ISBN 9782211213660. Translation by Lucie Delplanque. French-language edition
- City of Thorns: Nine Lives in the World's Largest Refugee Camp
  - This biographic follows the stories of nine individuals who fled, started and/or left the camp of Dadaab. The book primarily views the effects of the conflict through the eyes of the protagonists, while interspersed with commentary on the larger political and economic forces at work. City of Thorns is an urgent human story with deep international repercussions, brought to life through the people who call Dadaab home.
    - London; New York: Picador, 2016. ISBN 978-1250067630. Hardback.
    - London: Portobello, 2016. ISBN 978-1846275876. Paperback.
    - Stadt der Verlorenen: Leben im größten Flüchtlingslager der Welt. Zürich: Nagel & Kimche, 2016. ISBN 978-3312006915. Translation by Bettina Münch and Kathrin Razum. German-language edition.
- The Treeline: The Last Forest and the Future of Life on Earth, 2022
  - London; Penguin, Vintage, Jonathan Cape: ISBN 978-1-5291-1250-4
  - New York, Macmillan, St Martin's Press, ISBN 978-1-250-90596-3
- Think Like A Forest: Letters to My Children From A Changing Planet, 2026
  - London; Penguin, Vintage, Jonathan Cape; ISBN 978-1-78733-525-7

=== Publications with contributions by Rawlence ===
- Between a Rock and a Hard Place: African NGOs, Donors and the State. Edited by Jim Igoe and Tim Kelsall. Durham, NC: Carolina Academic Press, 2005. ISBN 9781594600173. Rawlence contributes the chapter "NGOs and the new field of African politics"

== Awards ==
- Open Society Foundations Fellow 2013
