= Meline Toumani =

American author and journalist

- Born: 1975 (age 50–51) (Note: In 2005, Toumani was reported to be 30); Tehran, Iran
- Education: B.A., English and public policy, University of California, Berkeley; M.A., Cultural Reporting and Criticism, New York University
- Occupation: Author
- Notable work: There Was and There Was Not: A Journey Through Hate and Possibility in Turkey, Armenia, and Beyond
- Website: melinetoumani.com

Meline Toumani (born 1975) is an American author and journalist. Her memoir There Was and There Was Not: A Journey Through Hate and Possibility in Turkey, Armenia, and Beyond was a finalist for the 2014 National Book Critics Circle Award for Autobiography and 2015 Dayton Literary Peace Prize. In 2019, she joined the faculty at Bard College to teach in their Globalization and International Affairs program.

== Early life and education ==
Toumani was born to Iranian-Armenian parents in Tehran, Iran, although her family moved to North America by the time she turned two. She grew up in an Armenian community in New Jersey and attended Camp Armenia in Massachusetts where she learned Genocide doctrines. One of the focuses of the camp was to teach hatred of Turkish natives and when she grew older, she used their various newsletters in her memoir.

Toumani graduated from the University of California, Berkeley with a Bachelor of Arts degree in English and public policy, before enrolling in the Cultural Reporting and Criticism Program at New York University.

== Career ==
After graduating, Toumani moved to Russia to serve as the coordinator of the Russian American Journalism Institute. She began her journalism career as an editorial assistant for the New York Times, during which she witnessed the spread of Anti-Turkish sentiments across North America. As a result, in 2005, she flew to Turkey and spent four years in Istanbul conducting research on the Turkish point of view of history. In 2007, she was selected as a journalism fellow in residence at the Institute for Human Sciences in Vienna.

In 2014, Toumani combined her research into a memoir titled There Was and There Was Not: A Journey Through Hate and Possibility in Turkey, Armenia, and Beyond. In the book, she examines both sides of the 1915 Armenian genocide from a native and diasporic view. She examines her own childhood in which she was taught Anti-Turkish ideals and her research conducted in Istanbul with politicians and locals. Her memoir was later named a finalist for the 2014 National Book Critics Circle Award for Autobiography and 2015 Dayton Literary Peace Prize.

In 2019, she joined the faculty at Bard College to teach in their Globalization and International Affairs program. Toumani teaches creative nonfiction at Goucher College.
