= Catherine Ceniza Choy =

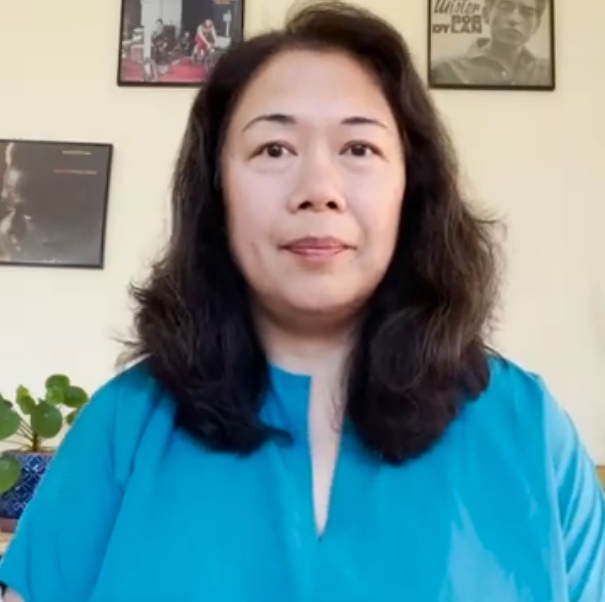
- In a San Francisco Public Library video in 2022
- Born: April 9, 1969 (age 57)
- Education: Pomona College, UCLA
- Occupation: Professor

Catherine Ceniza Choy (born April 9, 1969) is a professor of ethnic studies at the University of California, Berkeley. Prior to working at UC Berkeley, she taught at the University of Minnesota in American studies.

== Biography ==
Choy grew up in New York City and attended Stuyvesant High School. Choy received her Bachelor of Arts in history from Pomona College in 1991. Choy received her Master of Arts from UCLA in 1993, and then a Ph.D. in history from UCLA in 1998.

== Books ==
In 2003, Choy published a book entitled Empire of Care: Nursing and Migration in Filipino American History. Empire of Care traces the history and migration of Filipino nurses. Choy uses the term "empire of care" to refer global inequalities in health services due to an inequitable distribution of healthcare providers around the world. She argues that international migration patterns of nurses serve to exacerbate those inequalities.

In 2013, Choy's book Global Families: A History of Asian International Adoption in America was published.

== Awards ==
Choy was awarded a Faculty Research Grant (2009–2010), a Mellon Project Grant (2008–2009), a Humanities Research Fellowship (2008–2009) and a Townsend Center for the Humanities Initiative Grant (2007) from UC Berkeley. For her book Empire of Care, she received the History Book Award from the Association for Asian American Studies in 2005, an honorable mention for the American Studies Association Lora Romero First Book Prize in 2004, and the Book of the Year Award in History and Public Policy from the American Journal of Nursing in 2003. In 2005, she was named Edith Kreeger Wolf Distinguished Visiting Professor by Northwestern University.
