= Erum Shazia Hasan =

Erum Shazia Hasan is a Canadian writer whose debut novel, We Meant Well, was longlisted for the 2023 Giller Prize.

Based in Toronto, she works as a sustainable development consultant for the United Nations and other international aid agencies.
