= City of Thorns: Nine Lives in the World's Largest Refugee Camp =

2016 biography written by Ben Rawlence

- First edition cover (UK)
- Author: Ben Rawlence
- Genre: History, Biography
- Publisher: Picador (UK), Thorndike Press (US)
- Publication date: 2016

City of Thorns: Nine Lives in the World's Largest Refugee Camp is a history biography nonfiction work published in 2016 by Picador in the UK and Thorndike Press in the US, and written by author, journalist Ben Rawlence. Generally, the book follows the stories of nine people narratively through their respective journeys through Dadaab, the world's largest refugee camp, home to about 300,000 people (although the exact number is unknown and contentious).

== Description ==
The book's thesis can be summarized in that "the quintessential refugee experience is not so much of movement as [of] being stuck, physically and psychologically, individually and collectively."

"Located on Kenya’s border with Somalia, Dadaab was established in 1992 to house around 90,000 refugees from the civil war there. Since then it has grown into a large sprawling city in the parched desert where generations of Somali refugees are born and where the majority of those will die."

Among the characters followed throughout the book is Guled, a boy who grew up in war-torn Mogadishu, who was kidnapped and escaped from al Shabaab (an extremist terror organization); Nisho, born as his parents were fleeing Somalia in 1991 and clever Muna, who benefited from the free schooling offered at the camp. Her own strong will and education helped her to defy the strictures of her clan. "It is through their individual stories, their efforts to claw out tolerable lives, find work, have children, remain healthy, that Rawlence has built his remarkable book."

== Reception ==
According to the Guardian review, City of Thorns is a "remarkable book comes as a timely reminder that the vast majority of the world’s refugee population will never see European shores,"

A New York Times article by Caroline Moorehead states that the book "is a deeply disturbing and depressing portrait of the violence, destitution, fear, sense of hopelessness and neglect in which a large number of the world’s estimated 60 million forcibly displaced people now live."

The Foreign Policy Association has recommended the book for its Spring 2019 "Great Decisions" program on Refugees and Global Migration.
