= Vsevolod Nestayko =

Ukrainian children's writer (1930–2014)

Vsevolod Nestaiko
- Всеволод Зіновійович Нестайко
- Born: Vsevolod Zinoviiovych Nestaiko; 30 January 1930; Berdychiv, Ukrainian SSR, Soviet Union
- Died: 16 August 2014 (aged 84); Kyiv, Ukraine
- Occupation: Author of children's books

Vsevolod Zinoviiovych Nestaiko or Nestayko (Ukrainian: Всеволод Зіновійович Нестайко; 30 January 1930 – 16 August 2014) was a modern Ukrainian children's writer. In Ukraine he is considered the country's best-known and best loved Ukrainian children’s literature writer.

== Biography ==
During World War I Nestayko's parents were on opposite sides of the front. His father was a Sich Rifleman of the Austro-Hungarian army, and later a member of the Ukrainian Galician Army; his mother was a teacher of Russian literature and nurse in the Russian Imperial Army. In 1933 his father was killed by the NKVD. To escape the Holodomor famine Nestayko and his mother moved to Kyiv where her sister lived. After that time Nestayko lived and worked in Kyiv.

In 1947 Nestayko entered the Faculty of Philology of the Taras Shevchenko National University of Kyiv, from which he graduated in 1952. He then worked in the magazine "Dnipro", "Periwinkle" and "Youth". From 1956 to 1987 Nestayko was the editor in charge of children's literature magazine "Rainbow". Nestayko's first book “Shurka & Shurko” was published in 1956. From then till his death circa 30 of his stories, fairy tales, novels and plays were published. His books have been translated into twenty languages throughout the world, including English, German, French, Spanish, Russian, Arabic, Bengali, Hungarian, Romanian, Bulgarian, and Slovak. The adaptation of Nestayko's Toreadors from Vasyukivka won a Grand-prix at the International Festival in Munich in 1968 and the main prize in Sydney in 1969. The Fraud ”F” adaptation was awarded at the All-Soviet Union Film Festival in Kyiv in 1984 and at the Gabrovo Film Festival in Bulgaria (1985). Nestayko's works are included in school curricula in Ukraine.

In 2010 Viktor Yushchenko awarded him an order of Prince Yaroslav the Wise of fifth class.

On 30 January 2015 Google celebrated his 85th birthday with a Google Doodle.
