= Jan Jarboe Russell =

American journalist and writer (1951–2026)

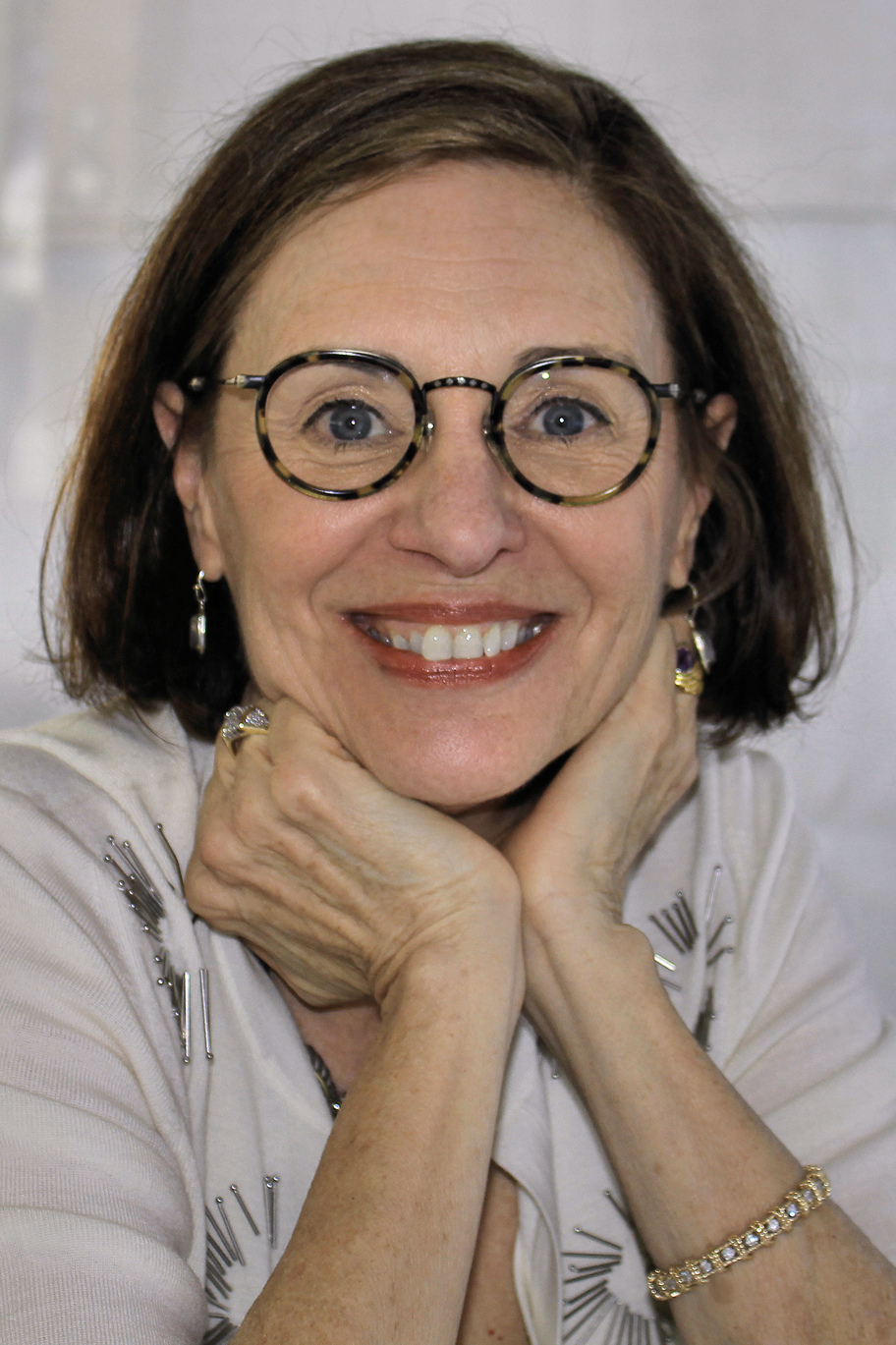
- Russell at the 2015 Texas Book Festival
- Born: January 14, 1951; Beaumont, Texas, U.S.
- Died: September 29, 2026 (aged 75); San Antonio, Texas, U.S.
- Education: University of Texas at Austin
- Occupation: Journalist
- Writing career
- Genre: non-fiction
- Website: www.janjarboerussell.com/jan-jarboe-russell/

Jan Jarboe Russell (January 14, 1951 – September 29, 2026) was an American journalist and non-fiction writer.

== Background ==
Russell was born in Beaumont, Texas, on January 14, 1951, and grew up in Cleveland, Texas. She graduated from University of Texas at Austin. Her work appeared in Texas Monthly. She was married to Lewis F. Russell Jr..

Russell died from complications of dementia in San Antonio, on September 29, 2026, at the age of 75.

== Works ==
- Cisneros: portrait of a new American, Corona Publishing Company, 1985, ISBN 9780931722370
- Jan Jarboe Russell, ed. (1 November 2007). They Lived to Tell the Tale: True Stories of Modern Adventure from the Legendary Explorers Club. Rowman & Littlefield. ISBN 978-1-59921-639-3.
- Linda Pace; Jan Jarboe Russell; Eleanor Heartney; Kathryn Kanjo (16 December 2014). Dreaming Red: Creating ArtPace. Trinity University Press. ISBN 978-1-59534-196-9.
- Lady Bird: A Biography of Mrs. Johnson. Scribner. 16 December 2014. ISBN 978-1-5011-0699-6.
- The Train to Crystal City: FDR's Secret Prisoner Exchange Program and America's Only Family Internment Camp During World War II. Scribner. 20 January 2015. ISBN 978-1-4516-9368-3.
