= Louise Erdrich bibliography =

List of works by or about American author Louise Erdrich.

== Novels ==
=== Love Medicine series ===
1. Erdrich, Louise (1984). Love Medicine (hardcover 1st ed.). New York: Holt, Rinehart and Winston. ISBN 9780030706110.
2. —— (1986). The Beet Queen (hardcover 1st ed.). New York: Henry Holt and Company. ISBN 9780060835279.
3. —— (1988). Tracks (hardcover 1st ed.). New York: Henry Holt and Company. ISBN 9780805008951.
4. —— (1994). The Bingo Palace (hardcover 1st ed.). New York: HarperCollins. ISBN 9780060170806.
5. —— (1997). Tales of Burning Love (hardcover 1st ed.). New York: HarperCollins. ISBN 9780061767999.
6. —— (2001). The Last Report on the Miracles at Little No Horse (hardcover 1st ed.). New York: HarperCollins. ISBN 9780061577628.
7. —— (2004). Four Souls (hardcover 1st ed.). New York: HarperCollins. ISBN 9780066209753.
8. —— (2005). The Painted Drum (hardcover 1st ed.). New York: Harper. ISBN 9780060515102.

=== Justice trilogy ===
1. —— (2008). The Plague of Doves (paperback 1st ed.). New York: Harper Perennial. ISBN 9780060515133.
2. —— (2012). The Round House (hardcover 1st ed.). New York: HarperCollins. ISBN 9780062065247.
3. —— (2016). LaRose (hardcover 1st ed.). New York: HarperCollins. ISBN 9780062277022.

=== Other ===
- The Crown of Columbus [coauthored with Michael Dorris] (1991)
- The Antelope Wife (1998), revised (2009) and published as Antelope Woman (2016)
- The Master Butchers Singing Club (2003) ISBN 978-0-06-083705-1
- Shadow Tag (Harper, 2010)
- Future Home of the Living God (2017)
- The Night Watchman (2020)
- The Sentence (2021)
- The Mighty Red (2024)
- I'm Hungry (2027)

== Short fiction ==
=== Collections ===
- The Red Convertible: Collected and New Stories 1978–2008 (2009)
- Python's Kiss: Stories (2026)

=== Stories ===
Year	Title	First published	Reprinted/collected	Notes
1981	The Red Convertible	Mississippi Valley Review	The Red Convertible: Collected and New Stories 1978–2008	First short story published. Later made part of Love Medicine.
1984	Saint Marie	(March 1984). The Atlantic Monthly	The Red Convertible: Collected and New Stories 1978–2008	Later made part of Love Medicine.
1985	Destiny	(January 1985). The Atlantic Monthly	The Red Convertible: Collected and New Stories 1978–2008	
1988	Matchimanito	(July 1988). The Atlantic Monthly		Later expanded into Tracks.
1997	Satan: Hijacker of a Plane	(August 1997). The Atlantic Monthly		
2001	Sister Godzilla	(February 2001). The Atlantic Monthly		
2008	The Fat Man's Race	Erdrich, Louise (November 3, 2008). "The Fat Man's Race". The New Yorker. Vol. 84, no. 35. pp. 85–86.	The Red Convertible: Collected and New Stories 1978–2008	
2014	The Big Cat	Erdrich, Louise (March 31, 2014). "The Big Cat". The New Yorker. Vol. 90, no. 6. pp. 60–64.	Python's Kiss: Stories	
2015	The Flower	Erdrich, Louise (June 29, 2015). "The Flower". The New Yorker. Vol. 91, no. 18. pp. 56–61.		
2022	The Hollow Children	Erdrich, Louise (November 28, 2022). "The Hollow Children". The New Yorker. Vol. 94.	Python's Kiss: Stories	

== Children's literature ==
- Grandmother's Pigeon (1996)
- The Range Eternal (2002)

=== The Birchbark series ===
- The Birchbark House (1999)
- The Game of Silence (2005)
- The Porcupine Year (2008)
- Chickadee (2012)
- Makoons (2016)

== Poetry ==
- Jacklight (1984)
- Baptism of Desire (1989)
- Original Fire: Selected and New Poems (2003)

== Nonfiction ==
- Route Two [coauthored with Michael Dorris] (1990)
- The Blue Jay's Dance: A Birthyear (1995) ISBN 978-0-06-176797-5
- "Two Languages in Mind, But Just One in the Heart" (2000)
- Books and Islands in Ojibwe Country (2003)

== As editor or contributor ==
- The Broken Cord by Michael Dorris (Foreword) (1989)
- The Best American Short Stories 1993 (Editor, with Katrina Kenison) (1993)
- Ghost Fishing: An Eco-Justice Poetry Anthology (Contributing poet, edited by Melissa Tuckey) (University of Georgia Press, 2018)

== Critical studies and reviews of Erdrich's work ==
- Beidler, Peter; Barton, Gay (2006). A Reader's Guide to the Novels of Louise Erdrich. Columbia: Missouri University Press.
- Chavkin, Allan, ed. (1999). The Chippewa Landscape of Louise Erdrich. Birmingham: Alabama University Press.
- Hafen, Jane (2012). Louise Erdrich: Critical Insights. Ipswich, MA: Salem Press.
- Jacobs, Connie A. (2001). The Novels of Louise Erdrich: Stories of Her People. Peter Lang.
- Jacobs, Connie A.; Peterson Nancy J. (2021). Louise Erdrich's Justice Trilogy: Cultural and Critical Contexts. Michigan State University Press.
- Kurup, Seema (2015). Understanding Louise Erdrich. Columbia, SC: University of South Carolina Press.
- Madsen, Deborah L., ed. (2011). Louise Erdrich. London: Continuum.
- Sarris, Greg; Jacobs, Connie A.; Giles, James Richard, eds. (2004). Approaches to Teaching the Works of Louise Erdrich. Modern Language Association.
- Stirrup, David (2012). Louise Erdrich. Manchester: Manchester University Press.
- Stookey, Lorena L. (1999). Louise Erdrich: A Critical Companion. Westport: Greenwood. ISBN 9780313306129.
- Washburn, Frances (2013). Tracks on a Page: Louise Erdrich, Her Life and Works. Santa Barbara: Praeger.
