= Chickadee (novel) =

Novel by Louise Erdrich

- Author: Louise Erdrich
- Language: English
- Series: The Birchbark House (series)
- Genre: Historical fiction
- Publisher: HarperCollins
- Publication date: 2012
- Publication place: United States
- ISBN: 0-060-57790-8
- Preceded by: The Porcupine Year
- Followed by: Makoons

Chickadee is a 2012 historical fiction novel by American author Louise Erdrich, the fourth book in The Birchbark House series. Moving the story fourteen years into the future, the novel follows Omakayas's twin sons, Chickadee and Makoons, as the family moves further into the Great Plains. When Chickadee is kidnapped, he embarks on a journey to reunite with his family against a backdrop of American westward expansion.

The book was first published in 2012 and received positive reviews from critics for its storytelling, attention to detail, and teaching of Indigenous history and culture in the United States. It won the Scott O'Dell Award for Historical Fiction in 2013. Scholars have highlighted the novel as a response to the stereotypical depictions of American Indians in many works of children's literature. It has also been described as a work of ecocentrism and language revitalization.

== Background ==
The novel is the fourth installment of Erdrich's The Birchbark House series. It was preceded by The Birchbark House (1999), The Game of Silence (2005), and The Porcupine Year (2008), which tell the story of Chickadee's mother, Omakayas. The final installment in the series, Makoons, focuses on Chickadee's twin brother and was published in 2016.

Erdrich has stated that she wanted the main characters of the series to remain the same age as the books' readership, shaping her decision to focus on a new generation in Chickadee.

== Plot ==
Fourteen years after the events of The Porcupine Year, Omakayas and Animikiins have married and have twin 8-year-old sons, Chickadee and Makoons. In the winter months, Animikiins goes hunting while the rest of the family stays home. He shoots a moose, but it attacks him, causing Animikiins to fall into an icy lake. An image of his father helps Animikiins to escape, and he eventually reunites with his family, bringing the moose with him.

Once the weather warms, the family moves to a maple sugaring camp. A mean-tempered older man called John Zhigaag mocks Chickadee for his small size and namesake, the chickadee. In response, Makoons ties Zhigaag's moccasins together and greases his jacket while the man sleeps, causing the entire camp to laugh at his disheveled appearance the next morning. Babiche and Batiste, Zhigaag's adult sons, decide to kidnap one of the twins in an act of revenge. They snatch Chickadee out of his family's tent in the middle of the night and flee the camp on horseback. When the family realizes that Chickadee is missing, they are distraught, especially Makoons.

Babiche and Batiste take Chickadee to their cabin on the Great Plains and force him to be their servant. However, Chickadee eventually tricks the two brothers, allowing him to escape. Soon after, he encounters a wagon carrying a priest and several nuns who decide to take the boy with them, believing him to be starving. They reach a small settlement, and the nuns roughly scrub Chickadee with lye soap, then attempt to cut off his braids with scissors. Believing the nuns intend to kill him, Chickadee runs off into the woods.

Meanwhile, Animikiins and Two Strike, Omakayas's cousin, set out to find Chickadee, and the rest of the family travels to Pembina to find Omakayas's now grown-up little brother Quill. They find Quill's Metis wife Margaret in Pembina and decide to wait there for Chickadee's return. Animikiins and Two Strike track down Babiche and Batiste, who confess that they kidnapped Chickadee but no longer know where he is.

Alone in the woods, Chickadee finds a chickadee bird who offers to help the boy, leading him to two hawks. The birds offer him food and guide him to a cart trail, which Chickadee follows from the woods, fearing another encounter with the nuns. Eventually, an ox-cart train approaches, and Chickadee sees his uncle, Quill, who rescues him. On the ox-cart trail, Chickadee learns the customs of the Metis and visits St. Paul, where he feels amazed by the city's size yet saddened by the destruction of the environment. Mosquitoes attack the train for several days on the way home, but they eventually make it through.

Without his twin brother, Makoons becomes depressed and falls ill. One day, after waking from a fever, Makoons announces that he can hear his brother. Omakayas becomes worried, fearing that Makoons is dying. However, Chickadee soon arrives along with his uncle, and the family rejoices.

== Style ==
Chickadee is a work of historical fiction, providing a description of Ojibwe life during American westward expansion. Reviewers note that Erdrich's extensive attention to detail in describing the everyday lives of her characters enhances the story's historical lessons.

Although intended for a younger audience, Chickadee follows many of the same stylistic elements found in Erdrich's works for adults. Its character list is expansive and continues the universe built in the series' preceding books, following the model of works like Love Medicine and The Round House. Erdrich switches between perspectives throughout the novel, telling the story through the eyes of Chickadee and his family members, another notable technique from her adult works.

While Chickadee is part of a larger series, several reviewers posit that the book can be read as a standalone work. However, this opinion is not universal, as others contend that knowledge of the series' previous volumes makes it easier to keep track of Chickadee's many characters.

== Analysis ==
Many scholars and reviewers interpret Chickadee as a response to the negative depictions of American Indians found in many classic works of children's literature. In particular, the book has been likened to Laura Ingalls Wilder's Little House on the Prairie series for its setting and themes. However, Seema Kurup, Professor of English at Harper College, argues, "placing the series in the context of the western frontier narrative is itself a form of literary colonization". Chickadee and The Birchbark House series should instead be read as "corrective texts" that present the history of the Ojibwe people. Likewise, Michelle Stewart of Mt. San Jacinto College understands the book as a literary form of counting coup: "instead of simply reworking or countering the original texts, they are in fact triumphing over negative images and mindsets while celebrating more culturally sensitive depictions". Young readers gain a greater understanding of American Indian experiences through Chickadee, allowing them to be more critical when they encounter stereotypes in classics.

Erdrich depicts the Ojibwe understanding of kinship with the environment in Chickadee. Roxanne Harde of the University of Alberta contends that Indigenous worldviews must be used to understand animals in the novel, as animals are understood as other-than-human people on which humans depend for all of their needs. For instance, small animals like the chickadee provide guidance for the Ojibwe to survive the mounting pressures of American expansion. Li-ping Chang of the National Taipei University of Business reads Chickadee as a display of ecocentrism: the main character's connection to nature allows him to survive his journey through the woods and eventually reunite with his family. This experience contrasts with the anthropocentric worldview of the Christian missionaries Chickadee encounters, which threatens to kill his spirit and culture.

Throughout Chickadee, Erdrich incorporates a wide variety of Anishinaabe vocabulary, which American poet Margaret Noodin describes as an act of language revitalization. Her use of Anishinaabemowin sustains the culture's "philosophies, politics, and aesthetics". At the same time, the language used to describe everyday life shows American Indians "as people engaged in universal human activities", pushing back against descriptions of Indigenous people as savage or uncivilized.

== Publication history ==
Chickadee was first published as a hardcover by HarperCollins in 2012. A paperback edition, which contains an interview with the author and activities, was published in 2013.

== Reception ==
Chickadee was met with positive reviews from critics. Writing for The Horn Book Magazine, Martha Parravano applauded Erdrich's ability to weave history into the story. School Library Journal gave the novel a starred review, noting, "All of the characters, even minor ones, are believable and well developed, and small pencil drawings add to the story's charm." The review also highlights the information Erdrich provides about Ojibwe history and culture. In a review for Booklist, Hazel Rochman praised Erdrich's depiction of the relationship between Chickadee and Makoons but also noted that some readers may struggle with the book's large cast of characters. Karl Hele, member of the Garden River First Nation and professor of Canadian Studies, wrote that "Chickadee provides an engaging and exciting read-along providing further knowledge of the Anishinaabeg people" while also introducing lesser-known parts of Indigenous history such as the Red River Ox Cart Trails. Debbie Reese, Nambé Pueblo scholar and founder of American Indians in Children's Literature, stated, "I began reading–but not racing–through Chickadee, because it is written with such beauty, power, and elegance that I knew I'd reach the end and wish I could go on." She also recommended the book in School Library Journal as an example of writing on Native Americans that goes beyond stereotypes, "[opening] the door to cross-cultural understanding and [empowering] young people to select literature that accurately reflects the lives of American Indians."

Chickadee received the 2013 Scott O'Dell Award for Historical Fiction. Martha Parravano of The Horn Book Magazine suggested the book as a contender for that year's Newbery Medal, although it did not ultimately win the award. The book has also appeared on many lists as a suggestion for middle grade readers for both its "direct, elegant style" and its historical lessons on the Indigenous experience in the United States.
