= Chickadee (disambiguation) =

Chickadees are a number of passerine birds in the genus Poecile in the family Paridae.

Chickadee may also refer to:

- Chickadee (magazine), a Canadian children's magazine
- Chickadee Lake, a lake in Idaho, United States
- My Little Chickadee, a 1940 film starring W.C. Fields and Mae West
- USS Chickadee, a minesweeper in the United States Navy
- Chickadee (novel), 2012 novel by Louise Erdrich
- Chickadee "Chick P" Pao, main character in the animated TV Show, Chop Socky Chooks

== See also ==
- Chickaree
