= Game of Silence =

Game of Silence may refer to:

- Game of Silence (Turkish TV series) or Suskunlar, a 2012 drama series
- Game of Silence (U.S. TV series), a 2016 American adaptation of the Turkish series
- The Game of Silence, a 2005 novel by Louise Erdrich
