= The Last Report on the Miracles at Little No Horse =

2001 novel by Louise Erdrich

- Author: Louise Erdrich
- Language: English
- Series: Love Medicine
- Genre: Literary fiction
- Publisher: HarperCollins
- Publication date: 2001
- Publication place: United States
- Media type: Print
- ISBN: 9780060931223

The Last Report on the Miracles at Little No Horse, first published in 2001, is a novel by author Louise Erdrich. The novel tells the story of Agnes DeWitt as Father Damien, the reverend who becomes part of the reservation community. Erdrich's narration alternates between Agnes’ early 20th-century memories and a series of interviews set in 1996 wherein another priest questions Damien about the possible canonization of Pauline Puyat.

Like the other works in the Love Medicine series, Last Report centers the lives of Anishinaabe families who live on a fictional reservation presumed to be in North Dakota. The preceding novel, Tales of Burning Love, also features Pauline Puyat as Sister Leopolda, but the events in Last Report connect most strongly to Erdrich's novel Tracks.

== Genre ==
Erdrich is known to mix the real and surreal in a manner reminiscent of magical realism. The way her novels connect with interwoven sets of characters and relationships in a fictional setting has also been compared to William Faulkner’s works. It can be argued that Last Report is a postmodern work because of its fragmented narrative, dark humor, and metafictional inclusion of the author herself in the epilogue.

== Plot ==
There are two main timelines: novel’s “present day,” set in 1996 during the last few months of Father Damien's life, and Damien's past as Agnes DeWitt, from 1910 onward. Erdrich intermixes these timelines; Damien has been writing letters to the Vatican since he arrived at the reservation in 1912, and these letters link the text to his memories of Agnes's life. Further details of certain events surrounding Pauline Puyat are explained, not in chronological order, through Father Jude Miller's interviews of Damien.

In the earlier timeline, the reader learns about the transformation of Agnes into Damien. After leaving a convent, Agnes briefly lives with a farmer named Berndt Vogel. They love each other, but Agnes refuses to marry since she has already been wed to Christ. Tragedy strikes when they are caught up in a bank robbery. Agnes is injured and briefly kidnapped; Berndt is killed in his effort to save her. Berndt had written a will leaving his property to Agnes as his common-law wife(link to wiki), so she stays there a few months longer until a cataclysmic flood destroys the farm and washes her northward. The flood also kills the original Father Damien Modeste, who was on his way to Little No Horse to do missionary work. When she comes across his body, Agnes buries him and assumes his identity. Upon her arrival, Agnes finds the reservation struggling with starvation. She meets Fleur Pillager and Nanapush, both of whom feature prominently in Erdrich's other works. Nanapush also introduces Agnes/Damien to everyone in the Kashpaw household.

Damien gets to know the residents through several events such as the altered marriages of Kashpaw and his wives, the accidental deaths of Kashpaw and Quill, the recovery of their daughter Mary Kashpaw, and the birth of Fleur's daughter, Lulu. In 1918, Spanish influenza strikes the reservation, resulting in over 200 Anishinaabe deaths. Damien cares for the sick and dying with help from Mary Kashpaw and Pauline Puyat. The following spring, Pauline enters a trance state which the parishioners interpret as a spiritual possession. Damien tells Jude in 1999 that this was in fact tetanus caused by barbed rosary Pauline used to murder Napoleon Morrissey.

A couple years later, Agnes/Damien is visited by “a great black dog” which had previously appeared to at least two tribe members accompanying a spectre of death. Agnes interprets this dog as being satanic in origin. The dog wants Lulu, but Agnes tells him to take her soul instead. The dog says he will send a temptation and then disappears. The temptation arrives later in the form of an apprentice, Father Gregory Wekkle, who studies under Agnes for a while. They have an intense affair until he leaves some months later. Agnes loves Gregory very much but is unwilling to abandon her life as Father Damien in order to be with him. Damien becomes depressed after Gregory's departure. He takes narcotics, spends a month in a dream state (watched over by Mary Kashpaw), and walks out into the woods carrying poison with the intent to kill himself. Nanapush intervenes and conducts a sweat lodge ceremony to heal Damien. Damien does not see Gregory again until Gregory returns to the reservation in 1962. Gregory dies of cancer shortly thereafter.

Between 1920 and 1950, Damien also recalls a variety of changes in the families’ lives on the reservation, including Lulu's and Nector's time at boarding school, Nector's joyride in a borrowed car which results in a violent encounter between his cousins and their enemy Lazarres, Fleur's marriage to John James Mauser and the birth of their son Awun, Mary Kashpaw's incident with Awun and their resulting child, Nanapush's encounter with a moose and his death by Margaret Kashpaw's cooking, the birth of Lulu's magical baby Gerry, and Mary Kashpaw's confinement in a mental institution.

Damien recounts much of this to Father Jude Miller in the spring of 1996. Jude learns from Damien's stories that Leopolda, another name for Pauline Puyat, was more twisted than saintly, and in fact a murderer. Jude also interviews Marie Kashpaw (Pauline's daughter), and Lulu, with whom Jude immediately falls in love. Jude decides that Damien is the better candidate for canonization. Later that summer, Damien is now over 100 years old and decides to end his life on his own terms to keep his secret identity hidden from the parish. He rows out to Spirit Island in Matchimanito Lake to die there amidst the spirits of his deceased friends. Mary Kashpaw finds Damien's body a few days later and buries it in the lake to protect his secret.

== Themes ==
=== Anishinaabe Spirituality vs. Catholic Dogma ===
Though Damien is ostensibly a missionary whose task it is to convert the indigenous people at Little No Horse, he ultimately becomes the one who is converted to the Ojibwe way of life. Damien writes, in one of his letters to the Vatican, that the Ojibwe spiritual system is “sound, even compatible with the teachings of Christ.” Father Jude Miller realizes by the end of the book that Damien, rather than Leopolda, is the more saintly. To illustrate Damien's saintliness, Erdrich writes many plot points as subversions of medieval saints’ stories to build him as a syncretic figure. Agnes' gender identity is itself syncretic and parallels her negotiation of Christianity and Ojibwe spirituality. In this novel and others, Erdrich writes conversion to Catholicism as “deadly,” suggesting an endorsement of Ojibwe religion.

=== Gender Fluidity ===
Agnes does not transition to Damien in a linear fashion; more accurately, she embodies both identities and more. Erdrich constantly moves between the pronouns “he” and “she” when describing Agnes/Damien, sometimes within the same paragraphs and sentences. Erdrich reportedly developed rules for when Agnes would react as her female self and when she would react as Father Damien, and this shifting happens continually throughout the work. Multiple times throughout the novel, when the question of gender identity arises, Agnes/Damien simply says that s/he is a priest, eliminating the binary altogether. Though she considers her life as Damien to be a “deception,” which implies that she does not think of Damien's maleness as her singular true identity, Agnes chooses to live as Damien because she believes her priesthood at Little No Horse is where she truly belongs, which makes the deception the truest lie one could tell . Agnes/Damien's fluidity is one way in which Erdrich's text disrupts the gender binary.

=== Loss and Resilience ===
The characters in Last Report must continually face loss of some kind: deaths of family members, loss of land, loss of love, even loss of sanity. Despite the tragic plot lines, Erdrich resists the idea of post-apocalyptic cynicism, instead emphasizing the resilience of the Ojibwe community and the cyclical, ongoing state of the natural world. The imperative to survive particularly shapes the storylines of Fleur and Nanapush as they contend with legal land disputes in both Tracks and Last Report. Ojibwe language also features prominently in the novel, which turns the text into a site of cultural transmission and preservation rather than a record of destruction.

== Critical reception ==
Christina Patterson wrote for The Independent: “Erdrich's precise lyricism is rightly acclaimed... more successful is her ability to encompass, in her encyclopaedic scope, a profound sense of the astonishing range of human yearning: the ways in which people and communities find the love, laughter and meanings they need to get through.”

Michiko Kakutani wrote for the New York Times: “By turns comical and elegiac, farcical and tragic, the stories span the history of this Ojibwe tribe and its members' wrestlings with time and change and loss….From these stories, and the story of Father Damien's devotion to his adopted people, Ms. Erdrich has woven an imperfect but deeply affecting narrative and in doing so filled out the history of that postage-stamp-size world in Ojibwe country that she has delineated with such fervor and fidelity in half a dozen novels.”

== Awards ==
Last Report was a finalist for the National Book Award for fiction in 2001.
