= The Red Convertible =

Short story by Louise Erdrich

"The Red Convertible" is a short story that appears in Love Medicine, a collection of narratives written in 1974 by American author Louise Erdrich.

The story focuses on the relationship dynamics between Lyman Lamartine and his brother Henry, a soldier who was deployed in the Vietnam War. The Lamartine family lives on a reservation, just as Erdrich's did. The author, who is of German and Native American descent, lived in Wahpeton, North Dakota, as a member of the Turtle Mountain Band of Chippewa in the 1960s.

== Plot summary ==
"The Red Convertible" is set in 1974 on a Chippewa Native American reservation in North Dakota. The setting briefly extends as far as Alaska, when Lyman and Henry embark on a road trip.

Lyman Lamartine narrates the story and recounts memories of his relationship with his brother, telling of the good times they had with the car until Henry's deployment to Vietnam and the events following Henry's return.

Three years after enlisting, Henry returns home and Lyman sees how he has changed during his time away. The old Henry has been replaced by a war-hardened soldier who cannot simply rejoin his and Lyman's youthful brotherly relationship. Henry wears only broken-in clothes and military boots from his time in Vietnam; he is either withdrawn or "jumpy and mean". Lyman had purchased a colored television for his mother, and now regrets doing so when he sees Henry entranced by the vivid colors, rather than the seemingly distant black and white of the television they had before.

Lyman mentions the car, hoping that those memories will help Henry. Lyman takes a hammer to the car in the hope that his brother will notice it and want to repair it. When Henry sees the run-down convertible, he works on restoring the car for a month. Meanwhile, Lyman still hopes that the car returns his brother to who he was before.

After Henry fixes the car, the two take it for a drive and end up down at the river. Henry tries to give Lyman full ownership of the car but Lyman constantly refuses, and two brothers start to wrestle and fist-fight over the issue. When Lyman hits Henry's chin, Henry begins to laugh and tells Lyman to take good care of the car. The brothers enjoy a short moment of laughter and then sit and think about how things used to be. Then Henry tells Lyman that he needs to cool off, so he runs and jumps into the river. Henry remarks apathetically that his boots have filled with water and he goes under in the current. Lyman rushes to rescue his brother but to no avail. Lyman then turns on the car and sends it into the river, watching it sink to its demise just like Henry.

== Characters ==
- Lyman – narrator of the story.
- Henry – Lyman's brother and closest companion, he is drafted into the Vietnam War and returns a changed man.
- Susy – a girl that the brothers meet on a road trip who lives in Chicken, Alaska. She has very long hair that she wears in buns.
- Bonita Lamartine – the boys' 11-year-old younger sister.

== Symbolism ==
The main symbol used in "The Red Convertible" is the car itself. The red flashy car represents the youthful, vibrant, and exciting relationship between Lyman and Henry. Before the war, the car is in mint condition and the boys are happy. The boys spend much of their time together and care for each other deeply, as shown by their actions and the road trip they go on. During the war, when Henry and Lyman are separated, the car is left alone, sitting in the garage untouched. When Henry comes back from the war a changed man, Lyman tries to rekindle their relationship, but when his efforts fail he destroys the car and in turn symbolically destroys their relationship. Lyman wants to remain close with his brother and tries to restore his personality. Henry spends countless hours trying to repair the car. When he does, the boys seem to have a glimmer of hope as they go for a drive to reminisce about the good times. At the end, when Henry drowns and is lost forever, Lyman pushes the car into the river to sink with him, representing that the connection that they once had is now drowned, dead, and lost forever.

Another minor symbol in the story is the picture that Bonita took of the boys with the red convertible. In it, Lyman's face is clear and happy, while Henry's face is hidden by a shadow in the picture. This image foreshadows the events to come, and Henry's fading away from his family.

== Publication history ==
- —— (1981). "The Red Convertible". Mississippi Valley Review.
- —— (1984). "The Red Convertible". Love Medicine (hardcover 1st ed.). New York: Holt, Rinehart and Winston. ISBN 9780030706110.
- ——. "The Red Convertible". In McMahan, Elizabeth (ed.). Literature and the Writing Process (print ed.). New York: Prentice Hall. pp. 463–469.
- —— (2011). "The Red Convertible". In Charters, Ann (ed.). The Story and Its Writer: An Introduction to Short Fiction (print) (Compact 8th ed.). Boston: Bedford/St. Martin's. pp. 305–312.
