= Tracks (novel) =

1988 novel by Louise Erdrich

Tracks: a novel
- Front cover of the US first edition
- Author: Louise Erdrich
- Language: English
- Genre: novel; Native American literature; literary fiction; family saga
- Publisher: Henry Holt and Company
- Publication date: 1988
- Publication place: United States
- Media type: Print (hardcover)
- Pages: 226 pp. (hardcover 1st edition)
- ISBN: 9780805008951
- OCLC: 88-9321
- Preceded by: The Beet Queen
- Followed by: The Bingo Palace

Tracks is a novel by Louise Erdrich, published in 1988. It is the third in a tetralogy of novels beginning with Love Medicine that explores the interrelated lives of four Anishinaabe families living on an Indian reservation near the fictional town of Argus, North Dakota. Within the saga, Tracks is earliest chronologically, providing the back-story of several characters such as Lulu Lamartine and Marie Kashpaw who become prominent in the other novels. As in many of her other novels, Erdrich employs the use of multiple first-person narratives to relate the events of the plot, alternating between Nanapush, a tribal patriarch, and Pauline, a young girl of mixed heritage.

== Plot ==
Tracks alternates between two narrators: Nanapush, a jovial tribal elder, and Pauline, a young girl of mixed heritage. In Nanapush's chapters the point of view is that of Nanapush telling stories to his granddaughter, Lulu, several years after the main events in the novel occur. When Lulu was ten years old, her mother, Fleur Pillager, sent her away to a government school. Because of this, Lulu is now estranged from her mother. Nanapush, therefore, narrates the story in attempt to reconcile mother and daughter by telling Lulu about the events between 1912 and 1924 that led Fleur to her decision.

Nanapush first meets Fleur in 1912 when he rescues her in the middle of winter and nurses her back to health from consumption – a recent epidemic among the Anishinaabe. Because of their shared grief at losing so many from their community, Nanapush and Fleur develop a friendship and begin to see one another as family. The next year, Fleur goes to the nearby town of Argus and takes a job at a butcher's shop, where she meets Pauline Puyat – the novel's second narrator. After beating a group of men from the shop one night at a game of poker, Fleur is beaten and raped. She leaves town, but the next day a tornado strikes Argus. Mysteriously, no one in town is harmed in the storm with the exception of the men who raped her – whose bodies are found locked in the freezer of the butcher shop, where they had taken refuge.

Fleur returns to her family home on the reservation, where she meets Eli Kashpaw while hunting in the woods one day. Much to his mother's dismay, Eli falls in love with Fleur and moves in with her. Soon, Fleur begins to show signs that she is pregnant and, although the true paternity is unknown, Eli takes responsibility of the child as his own. A new family unit begins to form at the Pillager home – Fleur, Eli and their daughter, Lulu, as well as Eli's mother, Margaret, and her second son, Nector. Throughout the novel, Margaret and Nanapush, whom Fleur regards as a father, also develop an intimate relationship. Together, the family faces trials of hunger, tribal conflict, and ultimately the loss of their land to the government.

In the meantime, Pauline has also left Argus. She stays with a widow named Bernadette Morrissey, from whom she learns the art of tending the sick and dying. She stays in Argus and visits Nanapush and the family home as an unwanted guest. Pauline serves as a midwife to Fleur during an early birth. She becomes increasingly jealous of Fleur and her relationship, and in an attempt to break them up, feeds a sort of love potion to Eli and a younger girl named Sophie, inducing them to copulate passionately in the forest. Claiming to have received a vision, she decides to join a convent, where she only delves further into obsession. She devotes herself to the cause of converting Fleur and the others, but is generally regarded as a nuisance. She develops several unusual habits as a means of self-inflicting suffering to remind herself of Christ's suffering. Her behaviors are frowned upon by the superior nun, and she is eventually sent away to teach mathematics at a Catholic school. Pauline's narratives deal with her own personal story and also provide a second perspective on many of the same events described by Nanapush.

== Major themes ==
=== Traditional beliefs vs. Christianity ===
One major theme in Tracks is the tension between traditional Anishinaabe culture and beliefs and the Westernizing influence of white, Christian America. This clash can clearly be seen in the two characters of Fleur and Pauline; as Michelle R. Hessler writes, "Fleur upholds the traditions of her ancestors and attempts to save their land from the rapid advance of white civilization, whereas Pauline enters a cloister, denies her Native American heritage, and brings death and destruction to the reservation."

=== Narrative structure ===
Contradictions, lies, and "double-voiced-ness" have also been identified as major themes in Tracks by some critics. As the plot unfolds, the narrator Nanapush is able to use his gift of speech to negotiate with government representatives on behalf of his people, but he often tells contradictory stories and even outright lies. Similarly, Pauline's narrative is unreliable and often contradictory.

Some critics view Nanapush as a reliable narrator. As critic Susan Stanford Friedman argues, "the novel overtly sets up a contrast between Nanapush as the reliable narrator who retains his Anishinabe religion and the unreliable narrator, the convert Pauline whose self-hatred takes the form of a denial of her Indian heritage and the adoption of a self-destructive Catholicism."

Nanapush is a critical character in the tension between the Anishinaabe and the whites because of his trickster qualities and ability to navigate both sides of the conflict through talking. Anishinaabe scholar Lawrence W. Gross points out that Nanapush's association with the mythical figure Nanabozho helps him to survive by enabling him to adapt white culture to his own traditions and interests, arguing that "it is the tricksters who survive to build a new world on the ashes of the old." Literary critic Sheila Hassel Hughes further expands on this notion by commenting on Nanapush's duplicitous speech, which, "like that of the prophet or the trickster, works simultaneously to undermine the power of the privileged oppressor and to appeal for his or her re-alignment on the side of the oppressed."

Maria DePriest also points out that, while Fleur is obviously the central character in the book, she does not get to narrate her own story. Fleur must battle two fronts - not only the external conflict of white America that threatens to take away her ancestral land, but also internal betrayals from her own people – but her story is told at a distance by Nanapush and Pauline, both of whom are unreliable narrators.

=== Hauntings and madness ===
Fleur has been described as "one of the most haunting presences in contemporary American literature", and Tracks is also characterized by the theme of haunting. Fleur is described as having mystical, shamanistic powers and at one point even travels to the spirit world to negotiate for the life of her second child. Several references are made to the manitou (including Misshepeshu, the lake spirit who is said to be a guardian of the Pillager family) and the windigo. For instance, in the first chapter of the novel, Nanapush describes his and Fleur's descent into grief at the loss of so many of their people to consumption, saying, "We had gone half windigo. I learned later that this was common, that there were many of our people who died in this manner, of the invisible sickness. There were those who could not swallow another bite of food because the names of their dead anchored their tongues." Their grief is characterized as a gripping depression, verging on madness. Madness itself is also a motif in the novel – manifesting most notably in the characters of Pauline (with her masochistic self-mortification methods) and Fleur (particularly following the death of her second child). Beidler notes that madness is associated with the characters' emotional distress at the destruction of their environment by the white logging company.

== Development history ==
Tracks is part of a cycle of books all set in the same fictional community and dealing with many of the same characters and families – the Kashpaws, Pillagers, and Morrisseys. Other books in the saga include Love Medicine, The Beet Queen, The Bingo Palace, Four Souls, and The Painted Drum. Tales of Burning Love, which features Sister Leopolda (Pauline), is also loosely related. Erdrich's method of writing these related histories of families from the same community has been compared to William Faulkner and his creation of Yoknapatawpha County.

After her success with Love Medicine and The Beet Queen, Erdrich was unsure of what to write about next. She had a 400-page manuscript that was to be the foundation for Tracks, but regarded it as her "burden". With the help of her husband, Michael Dorris, she decided she could use the story to continue the saga of Love Medicine and The Beet Queen.

=== Publication history ===
The first edition of Tracks was published in 1988. Several of its chapters had been published previously as short stories, including:

- Chapter Two: Originally published as "Fleur" in Esquire in August, 1986. This chapter, narrated by Pauline, relates the events of Fleur's rape in Argus.
- Chapter Five: Narrated by Nanapush, this chapter deals with the aftermath of Eli's infidelity with Sophie, and was originally published as "Snares" in Harper's, May 1987 and in Best American Short Stories 1988.
- Chapters One and Three: Originally published together as "Matchimanito" in The Atlantic in May 1988. In these chapters, Nanapush tells the story of the beginnings of his relationship with Fleur - how he rescued her from the sickness, helped Eli to woo her, and adopted Lulu as his granddaughter.

== Reception ==
Tracks received mixed reviews at the time of its publication, with most critics identifying Erdrich's vivid language and narrative structure as either effective or not.

R.Z. Sheppard criticized Erdrich's use of alternating narratives as too "schematic" and forced – and characterized her graphic descriptions as too "grandiose". "Crammed into a short, intense novel", Sheppard wrote, "her characters are too busy hauling symbolic freight to reveal their humanity." Similarly, The New Statesman and Society criticized the novel for being too vivid and heavy-handed with language, writing, "[Erdrich's] linguistic profusion veers toward sentimentalizing a people and their history."

In The New York Times Book Review, Jean Strouse found Tracks to be "a bit more didactic and wrought" than Erdrich's previous novels, and more political as well. She also highlighted concerns over whether or not Tracks could even be considered a true novel, since four of its nine chapters had been previously published as short stories – including one, "Snares", which was controversially published in Best American Short Stories, an anthology that claims it does not admit novel excerpts. Nonetheless, Strouse also praised Erdrich for "centering on life instead of self" in the novel, and called Tracks "a welcome contrast" to much of mainstream 1980s fiction.

Other reviewers responded positively to the novel, including Barbara Hoffert, who called it "splendid", and wrote that Erdrich's prose is "as sharp, glittering, and to the point as cut glass." Christopher Vecsey, in Commonweal, compared her writing to the magical realism employed by writers such as Gabriel García Márquez, and Andrew Welsh-Huggins placed her in the company of contemporary writers like Anne Tyler, John Updike and Toni Morrison. The reviewer for Choice compared her writing style to William Faulkner, identified by Erdrich as one of her favorite authors.
