= Future Home of the Living God =

2017 novel by Louise Erdrich

- First edition cover
- Author: Louise Erdrich
- Language: English
- Genre: Contemporary Native American fiction, dystopian fiction, speculative fiction
- Publisher: HarperCollins
- Publication date: 14 November 2017
- Publication place: United States
- Media type: Print (hardcover, paperback)
- Pages: 276 (paperback edition)
- ISBN: 978-0-06-269406-5
- Followed by: The Night Watchman

Future Home of the Living God is a dystopian novel and work of speculative fiction by Louise Erdrich first published on November 14, 2017, by HarperCollins. The novel follows 26-year-old Cedar Hawk Songmaker, an Ojibwe woman raised by white parents, who visits her birth mother's reservation just as the United States becomes increasingly totalitarian following a reversal of evolution.

The novel was listed as one of the 100 Notable Books in 2017 by The New York Times Book Review.

== Background ==
Erdrich began writing the novel in 2002 following the signing of the global gag rule by former President George W. Bush. Erdrich stated in an interview with The Handmaid's Tale author Margaret Atwood, "I started Future Home of the Living God sometime after the 2000 U.S. election. I was furious and worried. I saw the results of electing George W. Bush as a disaster for reproductive rights. Sure enough, he began by reinstating the global gag rule, which cuts international funding for contraceptives if abortion is mentioned."

Erdrich resumed writing and revising the novel again in 2016, including cutting 200 pages from the original manuscript, after Donald J. Trump won the 2016 presidential election. Trump stated that one of his first acts would be to re-sign the global gag rule, which would deprive women's health organizations performing abortions of their funding.

== Plot summary ==
=== Part I ===
Science says the world is going backward. Humans are no longer evolving; in fact, they are going back. Pregnancy and birth are now a matter concerning the government. A young woman named Cedar Hawk Songmaker finds herself in the very center. The story is told in a first-person narrative from Cedar's perspective. As Cedar is four months pregnant, the book is her writing to her future child, creating what she believes will be a historical record.

Cedar was raised by her adoptive parents, who are described as "Minneapolis Liberals," Glen and Sera, but now she feels the need to meet her Ojibwe family. Cedar struggled previously with not knowing who she was and joined a Catholic Church. Now, she wants her child to feel a greater connection to their Native heritage, so she journeys to her family's reservation to meet them for the first time.

At the reservation, she meets her birth mother, Mary Potts (Sweetie), stepfather, Eddy, and half-sister Mary Potts (Little Mary.) At first, Cedar feels out of place visiting the reservation. She does not necessarily know how to feel about Sweetie and the life they live. Cedar learns about Eddy's manuscript, which is a list of reasons not to kill yourself. Later she sees Glen and Sera's car pull up. The meeting between her two sets of parents is strange for Cedar, and there is an awkwardness in the air. Cedar ends up spending the night at her biological family's house. Before bed, Sweetie and Cedar share a nice moment where Cedar reveals her pregnancy, and Sweetie tells her about her biological father.

Feeling paranoid, Cedar makes several stops to stock up on the way home from the reservation the next day. She first goes to the grocery store, then to withdraw $8,000 she had kept in what she calls an old-fashioned bank account. Making a quick stop, she decides to pick up some baby clothes and toys. Back to her end-of-the-world shopping, then picks up extensive amounts of liquor, bullets, and cigarettes.

Nervous about the future of the world, Cedar is unsure what to do but is willing to risk everything to go to a doctor's appointment and see her child. At the appointment, the doctor says many cryptic things, including: "We've got one." He then tells Cedar they must keep her there, but after sending the technician away, he has Cedar duct tape him to a chair and run out the back way.

At home, while working on her religious newsletter, Zeal, a strange woman appears on Cedar's laptop. She refers to herself as mother and asks Cedar how she is. A few days later, the woman appears yet again. The same day Phil, her baby's father, appears at Cedar's door. He brings news that the government is trying to round up all the pregnant women, and they decide to hide out in Cedar's house. A few days later while out Cedar sees a pregnant woman get taken aggressively by police. Cedar now officially goes into hiding and no longer leaves the house, and Phil leaves to go get supplies. He returns a few days later.

Staying confined to the house is difficult for Cedar. Her mother makes several more appearances, there are several close calls in which Cedar nearly gets caught, and Phil is absent most of the time. Cedar tries to maintain a strict routine, although she still has more free time than she would like.

=== Part II ===
Cedar is abducted and forced to stay in a dull hospital with other pregnant women. Her assigned roommate, Agnes, has a defiant and aggressive manner. She instructs Cedar to stop taking the vitamins provided by the nurses. Cedar complies, immediately resulting in the shifting of her obscured image of a friendly and caring hospital to its harsh reality: a prison. Soon after she is introduced, Agnes gives birth and leaves without a trace, leaving Cedar clueless about what happened to her.

Agnes is quickly replaced with a new roommate who refuses to speak and has a mysterious manner. Without a name to call her, Cedar refers to her as ‘spider nun' in her diary. Cedar realized that Spider nun did not take her vitamins either, and she spent every night unraveling provided blankets into balls of yarn. This process became a ritual for the two roommates, stealing more blankets, unraveling, and later tying the yarn into long ropes.

After many more nights at the hospital, Sera enters Cedar's hospital room briefly as a nurse. Cedar is overjoyed to see her mother and the two of them become more optimistic regarding their escape plan. Sera, unfortunately, provides Cedar with the devastating news that Phil was the one to turn Cedar into the hospital, though after being tortured for some time.

When the makeshift blanket rope has reached the required length, the escape plan is solidified. Minutes before escaping, a nurse named Orielee finds the rope in its hiding spot and laughs, confiscating it. Before she can leave the room, however, Spider nun begins strangling the nurse. She speaks for the first time to Cedar asking for help. The two roommates strangle the nurse to death. Cedar learns that Spider nun's name is Tia Jackson.

After the murder, Cedar and Tia climb out the window using the rope and meet Sera at the bottom of the building. The three women are hidden in a storage area where they spend the night, the memory of the murder haunting Cedar.

Much time is spent in hiding, and a couple of relocations are arranged throughout. Eventually, Tia is ready to go into labor. Sera and Cedar try their best to assist in the birth and calm Tia. After many grueling hours, Tia gives birth to a stillborn baby. Later, Tia leaves the group, reuniting with her husband.

Sera admits to Cedar that she wishes for her daughter to lose her baby. To Sera, this means being freed from government control, but to Cedar, this is a devastating event and cannot believe her mother would think such a thing.

=== Part III ===
Finally, Cedar and Sera arrive at the reservation to hide, the area is much safer for her than living in the city. The two of them stay in the Pott's house, allowing Cedar to grow closer with her biological family. Eddy is actively involved in the reservation's politics, specifically getting land back. After the Dawes Act of 1862, the reservation was left as only a small piece of land. Being stuck at home all day, Cedar and Sera end up having a deep conversation, revealing a secret of Cedars identity. She was not adopted after all, and Glen is her biological father. This is difficult for Cedar to process and she does not know how to feel immediately.

Cedar gets abducted a second time soon after. She is moved into a separate hospital, one full of women forced to carry babies. The women in the hospital are forced to deliver babies until their deaths. This sadly becomes Cedar's future. At the end of the book, she gives birth to a healthy boy. Erdrich concludes the novel with Cedar talking to her newborn child, whom she cannot see in person. She wonders when the last snowfall will occur on earth.

== Characters ==
Cedar Hawk Songmaker

The protagonist and narrator of the story. A pregnant twenty-six-year-old Ojibwe woman described to have dark eyes and hair and medium to pale skin tone. She had been adopted by an affluent white family. Adopted daughter of Sera and Glen Songmaker. Cedar struggles with her Native identity as a result of this. Cedar's birth name is Mary Potts, the same as her mother, grandmother, and sister. Despite her struggles she is a dedicated mother to her unborn child.

Sera Songmaker

The white adoptive mother of Cedar Hawk. Sera is described to have "long, beautiful white-gray hair." Cedar describes her adopted parents as "trust fund liberals" but also as "truly beautiful people." Sera and her husband are Buddhists and vegans. She seems almost annoyingly cautious as she is "phobic about food additives" and is anti vaccine, as she believes that they cause autism or mercury poisoning.

The nurse / Orielee

Orielee is the nurse assigned to take care of Cedar and Tia Jackson during their hospital stay. Cedar believes Orielee does not have high security clearance, and thinks of her as loose-lipped. Cedar thinks Orielee is friendly, but finds her unsettling and does not trust her. Orielee mentions previously having a daughter who willingly turned herself to the authorities, and a two and a half year old granddaughter. Orielee is killed by Cedar and Tia Jackson after discovering their woven rope.

Spider Nun / Tia Jackson

Tia Jackson, originally referred to as Spider Nun is trapped in the same room as Cedar during their stay in the hospital. Previously a designer, Tia came up with the idea to weave blankets into rope to escape the hospital. Cedar hears Tia speak for the first time while the two kill Orielee. Tia's child is stillborn while on the run from the authorities. She opts to go back to her husband instead of continuing to run away with Cedar.

Mary Potts Almost Senior "Sweetie"

Known as "Sweetie" Mary Potts almost Senior is the birth mother of Cedar. She has dark hair and eyes she shares with her daughter. She gave birth to Cedar at around 16 years old, later putting her up for adoption. She is warm to Cedar although she herself acknowledges she's maybe not the most competent of mothers as she is oblivious to the drug use of her youngest daughter.

Mary Potts (Little Mary)

Younger sister of Cedar. She is a Native 16-year-old girl. She has dark eyes paired with a gothic style and heavy eyeliner. She has damaged long hair with short bits spiked purple and multiple piercings. She describes herself as "Gothlolita." She plays into the edgy teenager stereotype equipped with hostility, heavy drug use and a filthy room. She does end up warming up to Cedar.

== Literary influences ==
In an interview with Margaret Atwood, Louise Erdrich lists the books that influenced her when writing Future Home of the Living God: Russell Hoban's Riddley Walker, Kazuo Ishiguro's Never Let Me Go, P. D. James's The Children of Men, Lidia Yuknavitch's The Book of Joan, Ursula Le Guin's Always Coming Home and The Left Hand of Darkness, Frank Herbert's Dune trilogy, Octavia Butler's Lilith's Brood series, and Hans Fallada's Every Man Dies Alone. Most of these titles fall into the genre of post apocalyptic science fiction and feature human survival. Children of Men, for instance, tells the story of global infertility and is tied in with themes of parenthood and religion like Future Home of the Living God.

A primary influence on Future Home of the Living God is The Handmaid's Tale by Margaret Atwood. Both novels include a fertility crisis that leads to a heavy surveillance over pregnant women. In an interview with the author of The Handmaid's Tale, Erdrich discusses the importance of Atwood's book in her writing: "Your book has always resonated for me. Fundamentalist religions always include religious laws that control the female body—you got that perfectly right, and invented such a horrifyingly normal society based on literal readings of scripture."

== Themes ==
=== Control of women and babies ===
Control of women and babies is prevalent throughout the novel. Once evolution begins to decline, and the reproductive abilities of the human race are threatened, different governments rise to power hoping to prevent extinction. Throughout each of these regimes one thing stays constant: the need to exercise control over women. Women hold the power of reproduction, and thus play a key component in the downfall of society. Laws are quickly put into place designed to capture and imprison fertile women in order to force them into being pregnant and giving birth in a controlled environment. Being a pregnant woman herself, Cedar faces the brunt of these laws firsthand, as she is imprisoned on two occasions, and even gives birth in a government facility. Cedar describes this very moment in her journal by writing, "The pushing went on forever, until, with a violence I didn't know was in me, I pushed you out…As I slipped away, someone pried apart your fist and I felt you lifted from my arms." With this theme, Erdrich conveys the harsh reality women face, immediately stripped of their freedom and rights, when chaos erupts in a society.

=== Searching for identity ===
Cedar struggles to find her sense of self, alternating between feeling special and feeling out of place. Being raised by her wealthy, white adoptive parents, Sera and Glen, and being born of a middle-class Native American mother, Cedar wrestles with who she is and where she belongs. While Sera and Glen attempt to connect Cedar to her heritage, their attempts feel superficial. For example, Cedar is given the name Cedar Songmaker, yet her birth mother names her Mary Potts. This is ironic: the sing-songy nature of Cedar's adoptive name and the rather average name given by her birth mother. Sera and Glen seem to try honoring Cedar's heritage, though Mary Potts Senior, her birth mother, pays homage by giving her a family name passed down through generations. Growing up, praised for her Ojibwe, ‘uniqueness', the lack thereof in her name is a bit disheartening: "my ethnicity was celebrated in the sheltered enclave of my adoptive Songmaker family. Native Girl! Indian Princess! …I was rare…I always felt special, like royalty." Once arriving at college, Cedar realizes that she had been put on a pedestal that existed only in her childhood. "Without my specialness, I melted." In the novel's final scene, her younger sister asks what Cedar will name her baby. In the midst of digging through Little Mary's room, Cedar finds a piece of clothing with a label that reads Victoria. The decision to name her baby after something found in Little Mary's room shows Cedar incorporating her Native family into her future, though naming her baby Victoria is her individuating and making her future a combination of both worlds.

=== End of evolution ===
Throughout Cedar's journey, the world is facing a climate catastrophe: temperatures have risen and snow does not fall during the winter anymore. Furthermore, evolution is regressing. This unpredictable crisis provokes panic about the future of the world. Even the internet and television stations are taken over as pregnancy becomes a matter that needs to be controlled by the government. Women are not able to reproduce in the way that they once were able to. Heavy surveillance is necessary for the government to attempt to salvage as many pregnancies as possible and any woman who is pregnant must turn herself in to be kept under observation. Cedar, being four months pregnant herself, must navigate the world in a new light as she is in danger of these limitations placed on pregnant women.

== Critical reception ==
Some critics felt that the Future Home of the Living God had too many loose ends and was rushed. The premise of reverse evolution is "frustratingly vague," and the sudden appearance of prehistoric creatures is incredible even in the book's universe. The New York Times wrote that, " the novel's perspective is limited to what Cedar experiences personally or hears about," resulting in "tantalizing plot points that aren't followed through." Additionally, the state of the government is similarly implausible, "practically overnight [...] becom[ing] a theocracy, "the Church of the New Constitution," and all of the streets are renamed after Bible verses." Despite its intentionally mysterious air, reviewers felt that they didn't know what was really going on throughout the novel.

Writing for the Los Angeles Review of Books, Anita Felicelli said, "Future Home is a departure from the lush intimacy of Erdrich's Love Medicine and the dark, unforgettable storytelling of The Round House. As a gifted author's flawed, experimental foray into dystopian fiction, it illustrates an important distinction between dystopian writing that arises from dreams and fantasy and that which arises from observation."
