= The Sentence (novel) =

2021 novel by Louise Erdrich

- The first edition hardcover art of The Sentence by Louise Erdrich
- Author: Louise Erdrich
- Language: English
- Genre: Fiction, Mystery, Magical Realism
- Publisher: Harper
- Publication date: November 9, 2021
- Publication place: United States
- Media type: Print (hardcover)
- Pages: 387
- ISBN: 9780062671127
- OCLC: 1263759934

The Sentence is a 2021 novel by American author Louise Erdrich. The novel was shortlisted for the Women's Prize for Fiction and longlisted for the Andrew Carnegie Medal for Excellence in Fiction.

== Plot ==
Louise Erdrich’s The Sentence takes place in a Native American bookstore in Minneapolis, between November 30th, 2019 through November 30th, 2020, or All Souls’ Day. The novel follows Tookie through four distinct plot points: the death of a customer, Flora, and her subsequent haunting, family relationships, the Covid-19 outbreak, and the murder of George Floyd.

Through the story of Flora and her haunting of Tookie, Erdrich explores the beliefs of the Ojibwe and Potawatomi surrounding death. Tookie makes several attempts to rid herself of Flora, including burning the things Flora had given her and attending her cremation. While Flora’s ghost is confined to the bookstore, she does give Tookie the bulk of her attention. This haunting leaves Tookie feeling isolated and afraid.

Tookie’s relationship with her husband, Pollux, and their adopted daughter, Hetta, go through several changes through the year. Tookie feels she cannot talk to Pollux about the haunting because he usually shuts down any conversation about the dead. Their daughter comes home for a visit with a surprise baby boy. Tookie has never felt very maternal, but baby Jarvis brings that out of her. Hetta and Tookie had a strained relationship before this and Jarvis allows the two to heal their relationship over the year, with some setbacks. These three relationships go through the most growth throughout the novel, in large part due to Covid-19 and the George Floyd protests.

During this time, Hetta attends protests in Minneapolis, and Pollux helps protect a local Native American resource center. Pollux contracts Covid-19 and is hospitalized which adds directly to Tookie’s fears and isolation.

While many of these plot points are resolved, the ending is open and indicates a brighter future for Tookie and her family.

== Awards ==
Year	Award	Category	Result	Ref.
2021	Goodreads Choice Awards	Fiction	Nominated	
2022	Andrew Carnegie Medals for Excellence	Fiction	Longlisted	
2022	Heartland Booksellers Award	Fiction	Won	
2022	Women's Prize for Fiction	—	Shortlisted	
2023	International Dublin Literary Award	—	Longlisted	
2023	Prix Femina	Étranger	Won	
