= Michael Dorris =

American writer (1945–1997)

- Born: Michael Anthony Dorris; January 30, 1945; Louisville, Kentucky, U.S.
- Died: April 10, 1997 (aged 52); Concord, New Hampshire
- Occupations: Academic, fiction writer
- Spouse: Louise Erdrich (m. 1981; div. 1996)
- Children: 6
- Writing career
- Pen name: Milou North
- Genres: Children's fiction, memoir
- Subject: Native American studies
- Notable works: A Yellow Raft in Blue Water; The Broken Cord

Michael Anthony Dorris (January 30, 1945 – April 10, 1997) was an American novelist and scholar who was the first Chair of the Native American Studies program at Dartmouth College. His works include the novel A Yellow Raft in Blue Water (1987) and the memoir The Broken Cord (1989).

The Broken Cord, which won the 1989 National Book Critics Circle Award for General Nonfiction, was about dealing with his adopted son, who had fetal alcohol syndrome, and the widespread damage among children born with this problem. The work helped provoke Congress to approve legislation to warn of the dangers of drinking alcohol during pregnancy.

He was married to author Louise Erdrich, and the two had a family of six children. They collaborated in some of their writing. They separated in 1995, and then divorced in 1996. He killed himself in 1997 while police were investigating allegations that he had sexually abused his daughters.

== Biography ==
=== Early life ===
Michael Dorris was born in Louisville, Kentucky, to Mary Besy (née Burkhardt) and Jim Dorris. The senior Dorris was later reported as mixed race, with a Native American father. His father died before Dorris was born, reportedly by suicide during WWII. In an article published in New York Magazine two months after Dorris's death, a reporter quoted the Modoc tribal historian as saying, "Dorris was probably the descendant of a white man named Dorris whom records show befriended the Modocs on the West Coast just before and after the Modoc War of 1873. Even so, there is no record of a Dorris having been enrolled as an Indian citizen on the Klamath rolls." The Washington Post reported: "Dorris' father's mother, who was white, became pregnant by her Indian boyfriend, but, the times being what they were, she could not marry him. She later married a white man named Dorris."

Dorris was raised as an only child by his mother, who became a secretary for the Democratic Party. Two maternal relatives reportedly also helped raise him, either two aunts, or an aunt and his maternal grandmother. In his youth, he spent summers with his father's relatives on reservations in Montana and Washington state. The Washington Post reported that he was raised in part by a stepfather.

=== Education ===
Dorris received his BA (cum laude) in English and Classics from Georgetown University in 1967 and a Master's degree from Yale University in anthropology in 1970, after beginning studies for a theater degree. He did his field work in Alaska, studying the effects of offshore drilling on the Native Alaskan communities.

=== Career ===
Dorris taught at the University of Redlands from 1970 to 1971 and at Franconia College from 1971 to 1973.

At a time of rising Native American activism, in 1972, Dorris helped form Dartmouth College's Native American studies department, and served as its first chair.

He wrote the text to accompany the photographs of Joseph C. Farber in the book Native Americans: Five Hundred Years After (1975). He was named a Guggenheim Fellow in 1977 for his work in Anthropology & Cultural Studies. In 1980, he took his three adopted children with him from Cornish, New Hampshire to New Zealand, where he had arranged a year's sabbatical.

Dorris and Erdrich contributed to each other's writing and together wrote romance fiction under the pseudonym Milou North to supplement their income. Many of the latter pieces were published in the British magazine Woman.

Erdrich dedicated her novels The Beet Queen (1986),Tracks (1988), and The Bingo Palace to Dorris. The family lived in Cornish, New Hampshire.

While teaching at Dartmouth, Dorris frequently mentored other students. He was part of the successful effort to eliminate the college's Indian mascot. In 1985, after the couple had received major grants, the family moved for a year to Northfield, Minnesota.

After the success of The Broken Cord in 1989, and an advance of $1.5 million for the outline of Crown of Columbus, Dorris quit teaching at Dartmouth to become a full-time writer.

== Personal life ==
In 1971, he became one of the first unmarried men in the United States to adopt a child. His adopted son, a 3-year-old Lakota boy named Reynold Abel, was eventually diagnosed with fetal alcohol syndrome. Dorris's struggle to understand and care for his son became the subject of his 1987 memoir The Broken Cord (in which he uses the pseudonym "Adam" for his son). Dorris adopted two more Native American children, Jeffrey Sava in 1974 and Madeline Hannah in 1976, both of whom also likely suffered from fetal alcohol syndrome.

After returning to the United States in 1981, he married Louise Erdrich, a writer of Anishinaabe, German-American, and Métis descent. They had met 10 years earlier while he was teaching at Dartmouth and she was a student. During his sabbatical in New Zealand, Dorris and Erdrich had begun corresponding regularly by mail. After their marriage, she adopted his three children. They had three daughters together: Persia Andromeda, Pallas Antigone, and Aza Marion.

Beginning in 1986, Dorris's son Sava was sent to boarding school and military school. Madeline began attending boarding school when she was 12.

In 1991, his oldest son Reynold Abel was hit by a driver and killed. Dorris, Erdrich, and their three daughters moved to Kalispell, Montana, allegedly because of death threats Sava had made towards them. They later returned to New Hampshire in 1993. They finally moved to the Piper Mansion in Minneapolis.

Sava sent a letter to the couple in 1994 threatening to "destroy their lives" and demanding money. Dorris and Erdrich took Sava to court for attempted felony theft. The first jury deadlocked, and the next year Sava was acquitted of the charges.

The couple separated in 1995. Dorris went for treatment of alcohol abuse at Hazelden. Dorris and Erdrich divorced in 1996. Dorris considered himself "addicted to" Erdrich and fell into a depression.

=== Sex abuse allegations and suicide ===
Madeline and two of Dorris's biological daughters made allegations of abuse against him. In March 1997, Dorris made a suicide attempt. On April 10, 1997, he used a combination of suffocation, drugs, and alcohol to end his life in the Brick Tower Motor Inn in Concord, New Hampshire. It was later disclosed that during a therapy session, one of his daughters alleged that he had sexually abused her. In conversations with friends, Dorris maintained his innocence and his lack of faith that the legal system would exonerate him without his "demolishing" his wife and children in a "vicious" court trial. With his death, the criminal investigations into the sexual abuse allegations were closed.

== Reception ==
Dorris was the author, co-author, or editor of a dozen books in the genres of fiction, memoirs and essays, and non-fiction.

His Yellow Raft in Blue Water (1987) has been named among the "finest literary debuts of the late 20th century." It tells the story of three generations of women, in a non-linear fashion, from multiple perspectives, a technique that Dorris would frequently use in his later writings as well.

His memoir The Broken Cord is credited with bringing "international attention to the problem of fetal alcohol syndrome" ("FAS"). The book won a number of awards, including the Christopher Award and the National Book Critics Circle Award for general non-fiction. It is credited with inspiring Congressional legislation on FAS. It was adapted as a made-for TV film, with Jimmy Smits playing Dorris. In an essay originally published in the WicaSa Review, Elizabeth Cook-Lynn criticizes Dorris and Erdrich (who had written the foreword), claiming that they were calling for the jailing of alcoholic Native mothers during their pregnancies to forestall fetal alcohol syndrome.

When he and Erdrich co-wrote The Crown of Columbus (the only fiction they officially share credit for, although they frequently stated that they collaborated on other works), each individually wrote a preliminary draft of each section. Within the novel, various characters are writing collaborators. The work has been characterized as an autobiographical representation of the creative "pleasure and problems" that Dorris and Erdrich shared.

In Cloud Chamber (1997), Dorris continued the story of the families introduced in Yellow Raft in Blue Water, telling "the hard story of hard people living difficult lives with much courage". It was described as written in "evocative prose".

Dorris published three works for young adults during his lifetime; The Window was published posthumously. These novels also explore his themes of identity and sibling rivalry.

== Works ==
- Native Americans Five Hundred Years After (with photographer Joseph Farber, 1975)
- A Guide to Research on North American Indians (with Mary Byler and Arlene Hirschfelder, 1983)
- A Yellow Raft in Blue Water (1987)
- The Broken Cord: Fetal Alcohol Syndrome and the Loss of the Future (1989)
- The Crown of Columbus (with Louise Erdrich, 1991)
- Route Two and Back (with Louise Erdrich, 1991)
- Morning Girl (1992)
- Working Men (1993)
- Rooms in the House of Stone (1993)
- Paper Trail (essays, 1994)
- Guests (1995)
- Sees Behind Trees (1996)
- Cloud Chamber (1997)
- The Window (1997)
- The Most Wonderful Books: Writers on Discovering the Pleasures of Reading, edited (1997)

== See also ==
- Native American Renaissance
- Native American studies
