= The Master Butchers Singing Club =

2003 novel by Louise Erdrich

- First edition
- Author: Louise Erdrich
- Language: English
- Genre: Historical fiction
- Publisher: HarperCollins
- Publication date: February 4, 2003
- Publication place: United States
- Media type: Print (hardback & paperback) and audio cassette
- Pages: 400 pp
- ISBN: 0-06-620977-3
- OCLC: 49925192
- Dewey Decimal: 813/.54 21
- LC Class: PS3555.R42 M37 2003

The Master Butchers Singing Club is a 2003 novel by American author Louise Erdrich. It follows the lives of German immigrants Fidelis Waldvogel and his family, as well as Delphine Watzka and her partner Cyprian, as they adjust in their separate lives in the small town of Argus, North Dakota. Bookended by World War I, which Fidelis and Cyprian fought in, and World War II, which Fidelis' children fight in, the title contains several overarching themes including family, tradition, loss, betrayal, and memory.

Much of The Master Butchers Singing Club revolves around the German American cultural tradition, which is part of Erdrich's personal heritage, though she is best known as a Native American novelist.

The novel has been developed into a stage play by Pulitzer Prize-winning playwright Marsha Norman, and premiered as part of the Guthrie Theater's 2010/11 season in September 2010 under the direction of Francesca Zambello. In 2019, the novel was adapted in Germany for TV by ARD, one of Germany's main public TV stations.

== Plot summary ==
The novel begins at the end of World War I with Fidelis Waldvogel, a German sniper, returning to his hometown in defeated Germany from the battle lines. Fidelis seeks out Eva Kalb, the pregnant fiancée of his dear friend, Johannes, and informs her that her fiancé has died in the war. He tells Eva of his promise to Johannes, which is that he would marry and take care of her. She agrees, and soon the two are wed.

Fidelis, a butcher by trade, leaves Germany by himself to emigrate to the United States in order to escape the immense poverty brought on by the war. He plans to travel to Seattle to set up a new life for his family, paying his way by selling German sausages. However his funds and sausages run out in Argus, North Dakota. Fidelis first works for the local butcher and then sets up his own butcher shop in Argus. He works hard until he can finally send for his wife, Eva, and her child, Franz.

Delphine Watzka is the daughter of Roy Watzka, the town drunk, who grew up in Argus, North Dakota. Delphine never met her mother and leaves the town to become a vaudeville performer. Delphine meets and becomes attached to Cyprian, a World War I veteran. The two make money from an act where Delphine performs as a table upon which Cyprian balances. One day, after a performance, Delphine discovers Cyprian engaging in a sexual act with a man. This discovery changes their relationship, but the two remain together, posing as a married couple.

The two return to Argus, where they stop to see Delphine's severely alcoholic father. There is an overpowering stench in Roy's house, and in the process of cleaning the dwelling, Delphine and Cyprian discover the corpses of three people – two adults and one child – rotting in her father's cellar. The three corpses are later revealed as the remains of the Chavers family.

While attempting to unravel the mystery of the bodies in the cellar, as well as to eradicate the odor from the house, Delphine meets Eva. The two quickly become friends; Eva takes Delphine under her wing, allowing Delphine to work in the butcher shop, and mentoring her in many of the domestic skills Delphine had never learned.

Eva learns that she has cancer, and despite medical treatments and Delphine's nursing, her health deteriorates. Eva's sister-in-law Tante ("aunt" in German) Maria Theresa arrives to assist the family with the various means of daily life. Tante and Delphine take an instant dislike to each other. During Eva's painful final days, Tante destroys prescribed narcotic medication to assist her out of shame towards Eva's dependency on the drug. In one of the most gripping sections of the novel, Delphine tries to find a doctor and pharmacist while Eva's pain becomes uncontrollable. Finally, Roy breaks into the pharmacy and obtains the morphine that Eva desperately needs.

Soon after, Eva dies. Her death leads to the sobering of Roy, as she was one of the few people that was actually nice to him. Additionally, Delphine vows to raise Eva's four boys and to assist Fidelis.

Meanwhile, Albert Hock, town sheriff, has been investigating the Chavers case. Beads from mortician Clarisse's dress that were embedded in the floor over the cellar becomes the means by which Hock attempts to blackmail Clarisse into becoming involved with him. She stabs the sheriff to death and flees to the Twin Cities.

Tante and Cyprian both leave Argus. Tante returns to Germany with Erich and Emil. Cyprian returns to the life of the traveling performer. Both departures pave the way for a romance between Delphine and Fidelis, which eventually results in marriage.

Roy Watzka dies, but not before revealing the truth behind the deaths of the Chavers family. They were left in the cellar as retribution towards Porky Chavers, the father, singing over Roy in Fidelis' singing club. Roy did not intend for them to die, but due to the after-effect of an alcohol-induced binge, he forgot they were in the basement.

At the outbreak of World War II, Fidelis finds his family once again ravaged by war. His sons Franz and Markus both enlist in the United States Army, whereas his twin sons, Erich and Emil, enlist in the German military. Emil is quickly killed in the war, and his twin Erich is eventually captured by U.S. soldiers. He is transferred to a POW camp in the U.S. After Markus finds this out, he takes Fidelis there but Erich refuses to speak to either of them. Franz as well, on the American side, is gravely injured in an airplane accident, which eventually results in his death.

On a post-war trip to Germany, at which Delphine and Fidelis attend an unveiling of a memorial to the bombing of Fidelis' home town, Fidelis falls ill. He dies on their return trip to Argus.

The novel concludes with the revelation of Delphine's true heritage, as told by the town scrap collector, Step-and-a-Half. Delphine was the biological daughter of Mrs. Shimek (Mazarine's mother). She had been abandoned when she was born and found in an outhouse by Step-and-a-Half. Step-and-a-Half gave her to Roy to raise.

== Significant characters ==
- Fidelis Waldvogel: A German American immigrant and former sniper in World War I who works as a butcher in North Dakota. As his name suggests, Fidelis is a stable man who remains faithful to his personal convictions and also to anyone with whom he builds a relationship. He possesses a beautiful singing voice which stands in stark contrast to his rather brutal profession.
- Delphine Watzka: Partner to Cyprian Lazarre and daughter to Roy Watzka, she returns to Argus, North Dakota. Although she's never known her real mother, Delphine is forced to play the role as caregiver for not only her father but also to various other people of the town.
- Eva Waldvogel: Former fiancé to Johannes, wife of Fidelis who helps run many of the operations of his butcher shop; mother of Franz, Markus, Emil and Erich. Eva becomes a role model, much needed mother figure and dearest friend to Delphine.
- Johannes: Close friend of Fidelis who dies in World War I fighting for the Germans, leaving Eva alone and pregnant. He is Franz's biological father.
- Franz Waldvogel: Biological son of Johannes and Eva, Franz is raised to see Fidelis as his father. He is a strong intelligent athlete and develops a relationship with Mazarine. He also becomes increasingly interested in aviation, leading to his position as a World War II pilot.
- Markus Waldvogel: Son of Eva and Fidelis. Named after Eva's father, he is the more sensitive of the brothers. He is also rather introverted and philosophical, and becomes deeply attached to the women in his family. Delphine becomes especially fond of him.
- Emil and Erich Waldvogel: Twins born to Eva and Fidelis, they are the youngest in the family. Strong and simple-minded, the boys share a special interest in war games as children, which leads to their future position as World War II soldiers in the German Army (1935-1945).
- Tante Maria Theresa Waldvogel: Fidelis' jealous sister, controlling aunt to Fidelis' sons who prides herself on her strong German heritage and is one of Delphine's greatest rivals. Tante comes to Argus, North Dakota for an American life that her brother has found and finds nothing similar.
- Cyprian Lazarre: Former U.S. Marine in World War I, traveling performer and balancing expert, who struggles with his own sexual identity, and even though he loves Delphine dearly, his relationship with her only makes his struggle more intense.
- Roy Watzka: Delphine's father, town alcoholic, who never stops grieving over the loss of the love of his life. Although Roy is not a pillar of the community, he exhibits moments of integrity. However, Roy carries deep and dark secrets that will shake the whole town.
- Step-and-a-Half: She hoards not only the town's junk but a great secret as well. Her past, which she doesn't reveal until the novel's end, causes her to wander in and out of peoples lives much as she wanders about town.
- Mazarine Shimek: Franz's girlfriend; becomes a close friend of Delphine's.
- Clarisse Strub: Intimidating town mortician, and childhood friend to Delphine, who is constantly forced to fight off Sheriff Hock's sexual advances.
- Albert Hock: Sheriff of Argus who uses his power of intimidation in an attempt to entice the Clarisse Strub and also in solving the death of the Chavers family.
- The Chavers Family: Doris, Portland "Porky" and their young daughter Ruthie. In search of a bottle in the cellar, the family becomes the fatal victims of what started out as a practical joke.

== Themes ==
Identity: Erdrich plays with modern notions of identity by not ascribing an inherent essential self to the characters of Master Butchers Singing Club, and not reducing them to one single experience or factor. Instead, identity comes from a mix of things, and many characters experience a kind of blurred identity, in which they exhibit or hold dear two traits that would seemingly appear to not go together. Fidelis' butchering profession suggests a potential for brutality, but he also has a beautiful voice that he uses to unite the men of the town in the singing club. Eridrich reminds us that this is a world "where butchers sing like angels" (p. 388). Delphine likewise exhibits a blurred identity—she feels the loss of her mother deeply and wants to know her mother's story, but is not distraught when she is unable to receive concrete answers from Roy. Instead, she is able to cultivate meaningful relationships with women that mirror a mother-daughter relationship. Cyprian feels sexually drawn to men but attempts to live a heterosexual life with Delphine; he must constantly balance these two opposing aspects of his personality. Roy also exhibits traits that would seem to not go together in the same person—he is both the bad guy (neglectful father and alcoholic) and the good guy (Eva's savior from pain in her darkest hour). The characters are not defined by one single event or one single heritage; instead, they draw their identities based on a complex set of experiences, relationships, heritage, and emotions.

Loyalty: In the novel some of the characters experience divisions in loyalty causing personal dissonance. Fidelis, the German native, experiences this most clearly when WWII begins. This is best illustrated when the singing club decides to quit singing Germans songs—instead they sing American songs. However, when alone Fidelis sings old German songs that "fill him with shame." Fidelis also has the awful knowledge that he has sons fighting for both sides. Delphine feels divided loyalty in regards to her father. She feels very protective of him and cares for him throughout her life. However, he was a raging alcoholic that forced her to be self-sustaining from a young age, and she suspects throughout the novel that he may be guilty of murdering the Chavers family.

Family: Erdrich examines the true meaning of family in The Master Butchers Singing Club. Biological relationships are often hidden or deceiving complications of traditional notions of family. Through Fidelis' honor of marrying Eva and raising Franz after Johannes' death, the relationship between Cyprian and Delphine, Delphine's relationship with Roy and Step-and-a-Half, as well as the relationships between Delphine and the Waldvogels, Erdrich illustrates that family is not limited by blood. The characters are free to move in and out of their immediate biological family circles to create and sustain meaningful relationships that come to resemble familial relations, such as Delphine's motherly love and affection for Markus. Characters choose how to feel about one another and are not limited by their genetics.

Tradition: The defining theme of tradition stems from the traditions brought to the United States by Fidelis. Examples of this include the precision Fidelis takes in caring for his butcher knives, the perfection he achieves in his profession as a butcher, as well as the singing club itself. However, the singing club that is created in Argus is radically different from those in Germany. In Germany the singing club includes only master butchers as tradition dictates. However, in Argus there are only two butchers so it is necessary for Fidelis to extend the tradition to the rest of the town males.

== German-American heritage ==
Erdrich uses some of her personal family history and background as source for The Master Butcher's Singing Club. Overwhelmingly, Germans immigrated to the United States in search of an improved standard of living. There were incentives from land and railroad companies as well to insure jobs for German immigrants.

After a failed German Revolution in 1848, there was the greatest wave of political asylum seekers who left Germany. The majority of the German immigrants wanted to achieve, "The American Dream." They wanted to be where soil was fertile and space was abundant. By the end of the 19th century, most immigrants were unmarried industrial workers, who came to the United States seeking seasonal work but never returned to Germany.

Many immigrants would settle with or around others who spoke their native language or were from the same area of Germany. Many settled in the Midwest, where they became bakers, butchers, shoemakers, and cabinet makers. Germans also became high-profile businessmen and shopkeepers. The largest group of German immigrants were the skilled craftspeople. They immigrated to major cities such as Pittsburgh, Cincinnati, and Chicago.

In 1900, Kaiser Wilhelm II instituted the idea of national German pride. His influence was felt across the sea in the United States by way of a divided feeling of German-Americans on the stand of an imperialist Germany. This idea of loyalty was felt not only in the U.S., but in Germany as well. The Socialists felt that the Kaiser's power centered on a too militaristic reign. Millions of German-Americans held on to an attachment to the German language and culture. The 1830s through the 1870s saw a massive immigration of Germans to the U.S. resulting in an important ethnic German-born block of American society. The immigration explosion of youthful Germans resulted in a pro-imperialist view of Germany to the American public by way of the German-American press. 1901 saw the formation of the German-American alliance, a pressure group used to enforce propaganda geared to an imperial Germany upon politicians.

The United States entry into World War I in 1917 caused an increase in abuse on German-Americans. The public opinion of the time rejected all forms of foreign language and culture. Thus, upon the eve of World War II, there was no form of Nazi propaganda, leaving the German-Americans to have no biased view on the war without public retaliation. To this day, there remain untold accounts of German-American internment camps during World War II.

== Reviews ==
"Not since Richard Russo's 2001 novel, Empire Falls, which won the Pulitzer Prize, have I enjoyed the company of such memorable characters." -Bob Minzesheimer, USA Today. Feb. 6, 2003.

"Explored, exposed and cherished if not by each other than at least, unmistakably, by their author, these creatures wrench their vanished time and place into the modern mind with such force as to displace everything else -- not only during the hours and days spent reading about them, but in their interstices and the aftermath as well." -Anneli Rufus, San Francisco Chronicle. Feb. 2, 2003.

"The Master Butchers Singing Club is an ambitious novel, covering 36 years and several points of view. Too ambitious perhaps, because Erdrich can't keep up with her own agenda: she has created an array of colorful people but not one credible character, except possibly for the troubled, appealing Cyprian."–Brooke Allen, New York Times. Feb. 9, 2003.

"It is a measure of Ms. Erdrich's poise as a writer, her understanding of her characters' inclinations and dreams that she is able to make such developments feel not like the contrivances of a novelist playing God but like the inevitable workings of a random but oddly symmetrical fate." –Michiko Kakutani, New York Times. Feb. 4, 2003.

== Literary criticism ==
The historical facts of twentieth-century Germany, especially the traumatic events surrounding World Wars I and II, are built right into the structure of the novel.... Erdrich recognizes the political ghosts she will conjure up in writing about Germany.

1. Austenfeld, Thomas. "German Heritage and Culture in Louise Erdrich's The Master Butchers Singing Club," Great Plains Quarterly. Vol. 26 N. 1, Winter 2006, pp. 3–11.

2. Rowe, John Carlos. "Buried Alive: The Native American Political Unconscious in Louise Erdrich's Fiction." Postcolonial Studies: Culture, Politics, Economy. Volume 7, Number 2, July 2004, pp. 197–210 (14), Routledge.

3. Oliver-Rotger, Maria Antonia. "Literature and Ethnicity in the Cultural Borderlands." MELUS, Vol. 29, 2004.

== Theatre ==
In 2010, a play based on the novel opened at the Guthrie Theater in Minneapolis.

== Television ==
In 2019, the novel was adapted for TV by ARD, one of Germany's main TV stations. The two-part movie of 176 min. total time is named Der Club der singenden Metzger.
