= Margaret Noodin =

American poet from Minnesota (born 1965)

- Born: Margaret O'Donnell; 1965 (age 60–61)
- Citizenship: American
- Occupations: Poet, college professor
- Employer: University of Wisconsin–Milwaukee

Margaret A. Noodin (née O’Donnell) is an American poet and Anishinaabemowin language teacher. She is an Ojibwemowin instructor for the Grand Portage Band of Lake Superior Chippewa and resides near the reservation along the shores of Lake Superior in northeastern Minnesota. She also serves on the faculty at the University of Wisconsin–Milwaukee, where she teaches Ojibwemowin, creative writing, and Irish literature.

She is the author of Bawaajimo: A Dialect of Dreams in Anishinaabe Language and Literature, as well as two poetry collections written in Anishinaabemowin and English: Weweni and What the Chickadee Knows.

== Background and education ==
Born Margaret A. O'Donell in 1965, she grew up in Chaska, Minnesota. She has self-identified as having Ojibwe descent from her paternal great-great-grandfather; however, she could never identify what tribal nation she believed he descended from. She also identifies as being of Irish, French, and English descent.

She completed her higher education at the University of Minnesota, earning a Bachelor of Arts in English and a Bachelor of Science in Secondary Education in 1987. She subsequently obtained a Master of Fine Arts in Creative Writing (Poetry) in 1990, followed by a Ph.D. in Literature and Linguistics in 2001.

Her doctoral research, Native American Literature in Tribal Context: Anishinaabe Aadisokaanag, examined Indigenous literary traditions within cultural and linguistic frameworks.

== Academic career ==
Noodin has held a range of academic and administrative positions across several institutions. She joined the University of Wisconsin–Milwaukee as a faculty member in 2013 and was promoted to professor in 2019. From 2020 to 2023, she served as Associate Dean of Humanities in the College of Letters and Science, overseeing academic programs, faculty affairs, and institutional initiatives across multiple departments. She also directed the Electa Quinney Institute for American Indian Education from 2014 to 2022, where she led program development, research initiatives, and community partnerships focused on Indigenous education.

Noodin has held additional academic affiliations, including adjunct and research appointments at institutions such as the University of Manitoba, the University of Western Ontario, and the University of Michigan. Earlier in her career, she served as director of the Comprehensive Studies Program at the University of Michigan (2009–2013), where she managed large-scale academic support programs.

In 2023, she began working with the Gichi-Onigaming (Lake Superior Band of Chippewa), developing and teaching Ojibwe language and cultural curriculum for primary-level students.

== Research and scholarly works ==
Noodin’s research integrates Indigenous language revitalization, literary studies, and cultural knowledge systems, with a primary focus on Anishinaabemowin (Ojibwe). Her scholarship combines linguistic analysis with creative practice, frequently drawing on poetry, translation, and oral traditions to explore the relationships between language, identity, and place. Her work situates Indigenous literatures within broader cultural and ecological frameworks, emphasizing the role of language in sustaining community knowledge and continuity.

Noodin has contributed to interdisciplinary research on Indigenous environmental knowledge, ethnobotany, and water policy, including collaborations associated with freshwater sciences.

Her academic work also engages with comparative and global Indigenous philosophies, including studies that examine connections between Anishinaabe and Celtic linguistic and cultural traditions. She has participated in collaborative research initiatives on endangered Algonquian languages and projects addressing land-based knowledge, linguistic diversity, and cultural resilience, often employing community-based and participatory research methodologies.

Alongside her scholarly research, Noodin is an established poet and translator working in both English and Anishinaabemowin.

Her published books include Bawaajimo: A Dialect of Dreams in Anishinaabe Language and Literature, which examines narrative traditions and the role of dreaming in Anishinaabe literary expression, and What the Chickadee Knows, a bilingual poetry collection that reflects on language, landscape, and ecological awareness. In Weweni, she presents poetry rooted in Ojibwe language linguistic structures, foregrounding the interplay between language form and cultural meaning. Through these and other works, Noodin contributes to both literary scholarship and creative practice, bridging academic analysis with artistic expression.

Her publications also include literary criticism, translations of Indigenous texts, and contributions to edited volumes and journals in Native American and Indigenous studies. In addition to print scholarship, she is active in performance and oral storytelling, further supporting the transmission and visibility of Indigenous literary traditions in both academic and public contexts.

Her work was originally included in the Field Museum's Native American exhibition but has since been removed after Native American advisors questioned her Indigenous identity claims and she could not furnish any connections to any Native American tribes. Doug Kiel, a University of Wisconsin professor and citizen of the Oneida Nation, spoke out against her inclusion in the Field Museum's exhibition.

=== Learning Ojibwe: Anishinaabemowin Maajaamigad (2009) ===
Co-authored with Kimewon Howard, Learning Ojibwe: Anishinaabemowin Maajaamigad is an introductory textbook designed for learners of Anishinaabemowin (Ojibwe). Developed for classroom instruction and community language programs, the book combines grammar, vocabulary, dialogues, reading passages, and cultural context to support language acquisition while emphasizing language revitalization.

=== Bawaajimo: A Dialect of Dreams in Anishinaabe Language and Literature (2014) ===
In Bawaajimo: A Dialect of Dreams in Anishinaabe Language and Literature, Noodin examines the relationship between language, oral tradition, literature, and Indigenous knowledge systems. Drawing on Anishinaabe storytelling, linguistics, literary criticism, and cultural history, she argues that Anishinaabemowin conveys distinctive ways of understanding the world that are not fully captured through English translation. The book explores themes including dreams, ceremonial traditions, identity, language revitalization, and the role of literature in sustaining Anishinaabe cultural continuity.

=== Weweni: Poems in Anishinaabemowin and English (2015) ===
Published in Wayne State University Press's Made in Michigan Writers Series, Weweni is Noodin's first bilingual poetry collection, presenting original poems in Anishinaabemowin alongside English versions. Rather than direct translations, the paired texts reflect the distinct expressive possibilities of each language while exploring themes of memory, family, relationships, landscape, language, and Anishinaabe identity.

=== Gijigijigaaneshiinh Gikendaan: What the Chickadee Knows (2020) ===
Noodin's second bilingual poetry collection, Gijigijigaaneshiinh Gikendaan: What the Chickadee Knows, expands her exploration of Anishinaabe language, ecology, and cultural memory. Conceived first in Anishinaabemowin and then rendered into English, the poems examine nature, seasonal knowledge, history, kinship, and environmental stewardship from an Anishinaabe perspective. The collection also addresses historical events, including the Sandy Lake Tragedy and the Standing Rock protests, while emphasizing the continuing revitalization of Indigenous languages and knowledge systems. The book was shortlisted for the 2020 Foreword INDIES Awards and received the Bronze Award in the Poetry category.

== Awards ==
Noodin has received funding from the National Endowment for the Humanities, the National Science Foundation, and the U.S. Department of Education.

She has also been awarded philanthropic and institutional grants, including funding for Indigenous language programs and educational initiatives through the Electa Quinney Institute. In 2018, she received the Faculty Distinguished University Service Award from the University of Wisconsin–Milwaukee.

== Works ==
=== Dissertation ===
- Noori, Margaret Ann (2001). Native American Literature in Tribal Context : Anishinaabe Aadisokaanag Noongom. University of Minnesota.

=== Articles and essays ===
- Noori, Margaret (2010). "Native American Narratives from Early Art to Graphic Novels: How We See Stories / Ezhi-g'waabmaananig Aadizookaanag". In Aldama, Frederick Luis (ed.). Multicultural Comics: From Zap to Blue Beetle. University of Texas Press. ISBN 9780292739536.
- Noori, Margaret (2011). "Reading Queen of the Woods Today". Ogimawkwe Mitigwaki (Queen of the Woods). American Indian Studies. Michigan State University Press. pp. 57–76. ISBN 978-0870139871.
- Noori, Margaret (Summer 2011). "Waasechibiiwaabikoonsing Nd'anami'aami, 'Praying through a Wired Window': Using Technology to Teach Anishinaabemowin". Studies in American Indian Literatures. 23 (2): 3–24. doi:10.5250/studamerindilite.23.2.0003. ISSN 0730-3238.
- Noori, Margaret (2013). "Anishinaabemowin: Language, Family, and Community". In Hinton, Leanne (ed.). Bringing Our Languages Home: Language Revitalization for Families. Berkeley, California: Heyday. ISBN 9781597142007.
- Noori, Margaret (2013). "Beshaabiiag G'gikenmaaigowag: Comets of Knowledge". In Doerfler, Jill; Sinclair, N.J.; Stark, H.K. (eds.). Centering Anishinaabeg Studies: Understanding the World through Stories. MSU Press. ISBN 9781609173531.
- Noodin, Margaret (2014). "Megwa Baabaamiiaayaayaang Dibaajomoyaang: Anishinaabe Literature as Memory in Motion". In Cox, James H.; Justice, Daniel Heath (eds.). The Oxford Handbook of Indigenous American Literature. Oxford University Press. ISBN 978-0199914036.
- Noodin, Margaret with James Price and Tracy Boyer (2020). "Challenges and Opportunities for Nonmarket Valuation of Water Among the Anishinaabe Nations of the Great Lakes Basin" with James Price and Tracy Boyer in The Solutions Journal, vol 11, issue 2, online.

=== Books ===
- Learning Ojibwe: Anishinaabemowin maajaamigad. With Kimewon, Howard. Owen Sound, Ont.: Ningwakwe Learning Press. 2009. ISBN 9781896832975.
- Bawaajimo: A Dialect of Dreams in Anishinaabe Language and Literature. American Indian Studies. Michigan State University Press. 2014. ISBN 978-1611861051.
- Weweni: Poems in Anishinaabemowin and English. Made in Michigan Writers Series. Wayne State University Press. 2015. ISBN 978-0814340387.
- Gijigijigaaneshiinh Gikendaan: What the Chickadee Knows. Made in Michigan Writers Series. Wayne State University Press. 2020. ISBN 978-0814347508

In anthology

- Melissa Tuckey, ed. (2018). Ghost Fishing: An Eco-Justice Poetry Anthology. University of Georgia Press. ISBN 978-0820353159.
- Erdrich, Heid, ed. (2018). New Poets of Native Nations. Graywolf Press. ISBN 978-1555978099.
- LaPensee, Elizabeth, ed. (2019). Sovereign Traces. volume 2: Relational Constellation. Michigan State University Press. ISBN 978-1938065118.

=== Poetry online ===
- "Waawaateseg (Fireflies)". Michigan Quarterly Review. 2011.
- "Dinebikeyah (Dine Land)". Ojibwe.net. 2014.
- "Nimbiiskaabiimin Apane, and: We Are Returning Always". Cream City Review. 38 (1). Spring–Summer 2014. doi:10.1353/ccr.2014.0016.

=== Bilingual children’s and young adult literature ===
These include translations and adaptations)

- Noodin, M. (Trans.). (2026). Jejiibadakii / હાથીભાઈ. StoryWeaver, Pratham Books.
- Noodin, M. (Trans.). (2026). Chi miigwech / Big thank you (with A. Mesic). Orca Book Publishers.
- Noodin, M. (Trans.). (2026). Nimaamaa, Biibaagim a’aw Bineshiinh! StoryWeaver, Pratham Books.
- Noodin, M. (Trans.). (2025). Omaamakaadendaagozi Edwiina / The fabulous Edweena (with A. Mesic). Second Story Press.
- Noodin, M., & Zimmerman, M. (2024). Nanaboozhoo babaamosed: Nanaboozhoo went walking & other stories from Grand Portage. Hidden Timber Press.
- Noodin, M., & Mesic, A. (2022). Ajijaak miinawaa bizhiw mazina’igan izhi-atisige. Waub Ajijaak Press.
- Noodin, M. (Trans.). (2021). Dakonaninjingwaan: To fall asleep holding hands. Waub Ajijaak Press.
