= The Night Watchman (novel) =

2020 novel by Louise Erdrich

- First edition cover
- Author: Louise Erdrich
- Language: English
- Genre: Contemporary Native American fiction
- Published: March 3, 2020
- Publisher: HarperCollins
- Publication place: United States
- Media type: Hardcover & Paperback
- Pages: 464
- ISBN: 9780062671196

The Night Watchman is a novel by American author Louise Erdrich, first published on March 3, 2020, by HarperCollins. The novel is set in the 1950s. This is Erdrich's sixth standalone novel following Future Home of the Living God. The novel was inspired by the life of Erdrich's grandfather who motivated and inspired other members of the Turtle Mountain Reservation to resist the Indian termination policies of the 1940s–1960s. The Night Watchman is the first novel that Erdrich has written that is set on the Turtle Mountain Reservation.

The novel was awarded the 2021 Pulitzer Prize for Fiction and the 2025 William Dean Howells Medal.

== Writing and composition ==
The novel was directly inspired by the letters written by Erdrich's grandfather detailing his resistance against termination bills meant to assimilate Ojibwe people into broader American society through a variety of means, including the end of federal recognition of the sovereignty of indigenous tribes. Erdrich has referred to the letters as "beautiful, full of humor and storytelling." She based The Night Watchman on his loving personality and commitment to his tribe.

This historical fiction provides detailed descriptions of surroundings and relationships between characters. Alongside the political storyline, readers follow a variety of other characters through daily life on the reservation, family tragedy, boxing matches, and romance. It is written in third person and follows a number of characters, and in some instances, animals. The story switches narrators between other characters in the book to give a different perspective.

== Plot ==
Thomas Wazhashk, a night watchman at a jewel bearing plant and an Ojibwe Councilor, works to comprehend the consequences of a new termination bill drafted by Arthur Vivian Watkins heading to the floor of the United States Congress. In 1953, Thomas and other Ojibwe people begin to fear the implications of this bill.

As Thomas tries to save his tribe from termination, his niece Patrice embarks on a journey to Minneapolis in order to find her sister, Vera. Patrice Paranteau, a young Ojibwe woman and a former high school valedictorian, balances the demands of both modern and traditional life. She works at the jewel bearing plant and earns just enough to help her mother Zhanaat and her brother Pokey. Patrice's alcoholic father comes home sporadically to threaten the family for cash. Patrice uses her saved money to look for her sister Vera, who vanished after moving to Minneapolis with her husband. During her journey, Patrice encounters abuse and danger.

The lives of the young Ojibwe boxer Wood Mountain and his mother Juggie Blue intersect with those of many others living on the reservation as they each make the best out of their respective circumstances.

== Characters ==
Thomas Wazhask – Thomas is a kindhearted man, a husband, and a father who spends his nights as a Watchman in a jewel bearing plant in Turtle Mountain. He becomes politically involved when he reads the Indian Termination Bill and begins to organize against it. Wazhask translates to "muskrat" in Ojibwe and is pronounced Wa-shush-k. While locked outside of his place of work during a snowstorm in the night, Thomas experiences a vision where he describes seeing Jesus Christ and others.

Patrice Paranteau – Patrice (also known as Pixie) is a strong, willful 19-year-old who is determined to find her missing older sister, Vera. She ventures to the city and takes up a job performing at a bar while pursuing various leads towards her sister's whereabouts.

Vera Paranteau – Vera is Pixie's older sister, who is missing in Minneapolis and has had a baby.

Pokey Paranteau – Pokey is Pixie's younger brother.

Zhanaat Paranteau – Mother of Pokey, Vera, and Patrice Paranteau, Zhanaat lives on the reservation and taught Patrice about traditional ways of living.

Lloyd Barnes – A local math teacher at the reservation school. He is referred to as "Hay Stack" by members of the community because of his blonde hair. It is well known among the community that he desires a romantic relationship with Patrice Paranteau.

Wood Mountain – A young boxer under the tutelage of Lloyd Barnes and the son of Juggie Blue. He has a crush on Patrice, but he focuses on helping Patrice find her missing sister Vera. He does not pursue Patrice in the same way Barnes does. He fights against Joe Wobleszynski at the Battle Royale to raise money for Thomas and the other members of the community council to travel to Washington, D.C.

Millie Cloud – The daughter of Louis Pipestone and half-sister of Grace Pipestone. Millie is a college student studying economics at the University of Minnesota. She later changes her major to Anthropology after spending time around her family and other Turtle Mountain Ojibwe. She becomes involved in the resistance effort against the passing of House Concurrent Resolution 108 bill when asked by Thomas Wazhashk and her father to present her research findings on the Turtle Mountain Reservation's resources in court.

Arthur V. Watkins – A Republican senator from Utah who is also a Mormon. Erdrich's fictional version of Arthur V. Watkins is heavily based on the real person; his dialogue during the characters' visit to Congress is pulled from actual transcriptions.

Vernon and Elnath – These two Mormon missionaries believe the Chippewa are Lamanites.

== Semi-fiction ==
Aspects of this fictional novel are inspired by historical events. The jewel-bearing plant is based on a real factory in Turtle Mountain where mostly women were employed. While an attempt in 1955 to unionize failed, the workers succeeded in their demand for higher pay and better working conditions.

In the chapter "Falcon Eyes", Patrice attends a meeting of the United States House of Representatives, where she sees a beautiful woman who fires a gun into the air.

The fictional dialog written in the book about Turtle Mountain's testimony to Congress closely follows the real transcripts of the testimony given there.

== Recurring elements ==
=== Animals ===
Animals and animal intelligence are a recurring subject in The Night Watchman. One chapter is entirely from the perspective of two escaped horses. At another point, Patrice perceives a dog as speaking to her, giving her information on the fate of her sister.

Another animal that provides symbolism is the owl. Thomas and the owl have a connection because similar to the owl Thomas stays up guarding the factory and tries to persuade people in power to support them against termination. "The owl shares Thomas' solitude and symbolizes the mental and psychic loneliness of his battle".

Additionally, the muskrat provides symbolism. The book mentions it being an "ordinary" yet "crucial" animal toward creating the Earth in a cultural tale. Thomas mirrors the muskrat in this way by also playing a crucial role in supporting the Turtle Mountain Band of Chippewa against losing their land to the bill.

=== Ambiguous magic ===
There are several instances in the novel seemingly caused by magical or supernatural means. The partial facial paralysis of a classmate occurs after he tried to sexually assault Patrice was supposedly an instance of magic. Erdrich leaves the reality of these scenes intentionally ambiguous. When asked why this was, she stated "So many things happen to us that we immediately explain away, and so I'm just not explaining away what's happening."

== Reception ==
=== Critical reception ===
In a review for The New York Times, Luis Alberto Urrea praised the novel, referring to it as "[...] a magisterial epic that brings [Erdrich's] power of witness to every page." Love, rage, political resistance, and courage saturate the lives of the memorable characters in The Night Watchman. Ron Charles of The Washington Post says that Erdrich "rediscovers her genius" with this novel. A review for USA Today praised the relatability of the novel. The Boston Globe recognizes faults some may find with the novel, but ultimately views it as among "...the best of her remarkable fiction." Other critics have noted the beauty of the "family feeling" of the novel, the endurance of the characters, and called Erdrich a "master storyteller."

The gradual way that the poverty of certain characters is presented in the novel has also received praise with Erdrich remarking on the ways this mirrored real life. Erdrich has also addressed in interviews the importance of Patrice's role in the novel and how she functions as a second protagonist, saying that her daughter even made a separate cover for the novel with the title Pixie. While this novel is set in the past, Erdrich comments on the issues that still persist within Indigenous communities today, stating "It's true that the policies that start with dispossession do not stop there."

=== Honors ===
The novel won the 2021 Pulitzer Prize. The committee awarding the prize referred to the novel as "[...] a majestic, polyphonic novel about a community's efforts to halt the proposed displacement and elimination of several Native American tribes in the 1950s, rendered with dexterity and imagination." The novel won William Dean Howells Medal in 2025.
