= Louise Erdrich =

American author (born 1954)

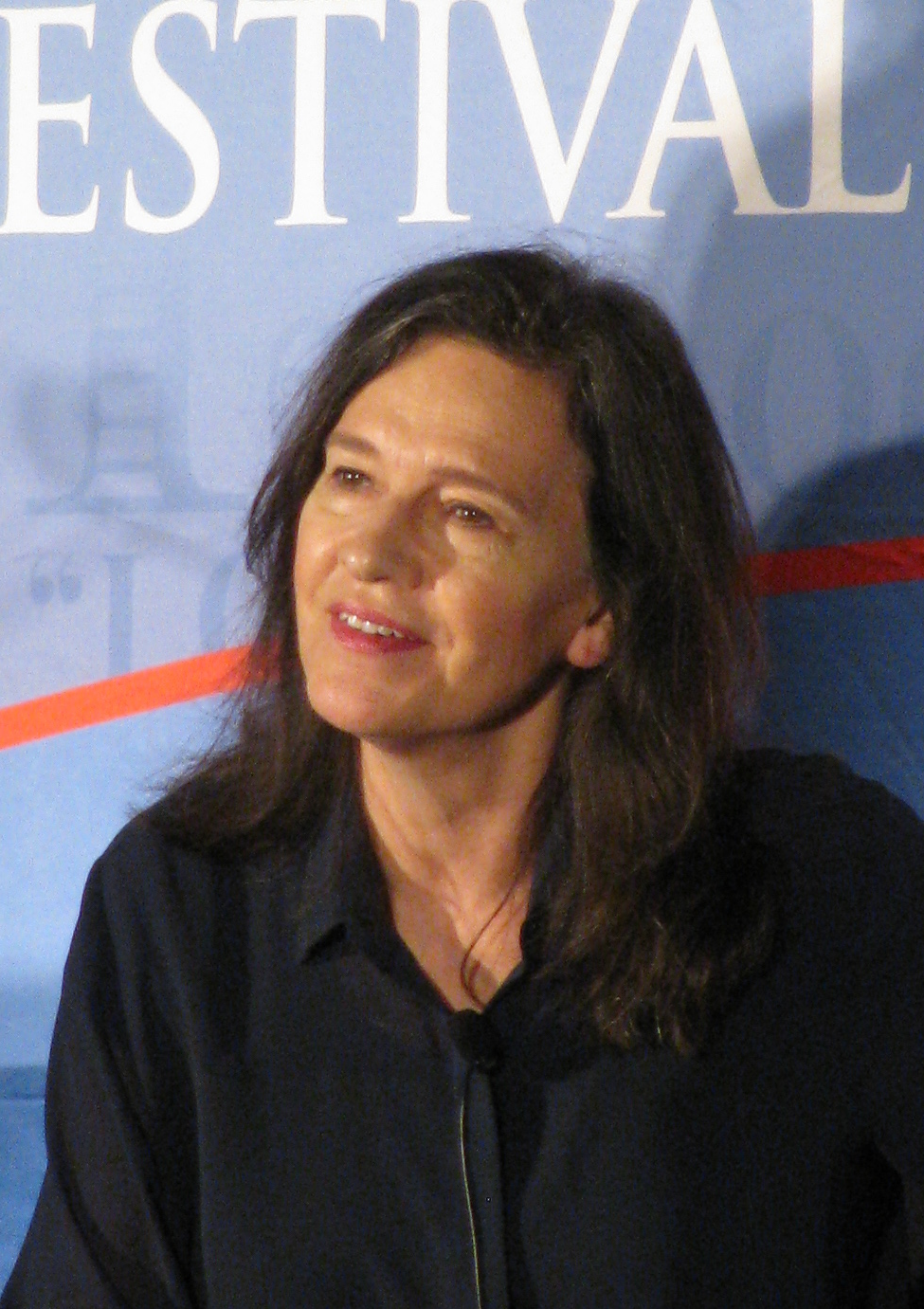
- Erdrich at the 2015 National Book Festival.
- Born: Karen Louise Erdrich; June 7, 1954 (age 72); Little Falls, Minnesota, U.S.
- Citizenship: Turtle Mountain Band of Chippewa Indians of North Dakota and American
- Education: Dartmouth College (BA); Johns Hopkins University (MA)
- Occupations: Novelist; short story writer; poet
- Spouse: Michael Dorris (m. 1981; div. 1996)
- Children: 7
- Relatives: Heid E. Erdrich (sister)
- Writing career
- Genres: Native American literature, children's books
- Notable works: Love Medicine; The Birchbark House; The Round House; LaRose; Future Home of the Living God; The Night Watchman
- Notable awards: National Book Award for Fiction (2012); Pulitzer Prize for Fiction (2021)
- Movements: Postmodernism, Native American Renaissance
- Website: birchbarkbooks.com/blogs/birchbark

Karen Louise Erdrich (/ˈɜːrdrɪk/ ER-drik; born June 7, 1954) is an Indigenous-American author of novels, short stories, poetry, and children's books featuring Native American characters and settings. She is an enrolled citizen of the Turtle Mountain Band of Chippewa Indians of North Dakota, a federally recognized Ojibwe people.

Erdrich is widely acclaimed as one of the most significant writers of the second wave of the Native American Renaissance. She has written 28 books in all, including fiction, non-fiction, poetry, and children's books. In 2009, her novel The Plague of Doves was a finalist for the Pulitzer Prize for Fiction and received an Anisfield-Wolf Book Award. In November 2012, she received the National Book Award for Fiction for her novel The Round House. She is a 2013 recipient of the Alex Awards. She was awarded the Library of Congress Prize for American Fiction at the National Book Festival in September 2015. In 2021, she was awarded the Pulitzer Prize for Fiction for her novel The Night Watchman.

She was married to author Michael Dorris and the two collaborated on a number of works. The couple separated in 1995 and then divorced in 1996. Dorris took his own life in 1997 as allegations that he sexually abused at least three of the daughters whom he raised with Erdrich were under investigation.

She is also the owner of Birchbark Books, a small independent bookstore in Minneapolis that focuses on Native American literature and the Native community in the Twin Cities.

== Personal life ==
Erdrich was born on June 7, 1954, in Little Falls, Minnesota. She was the eldest of seven children born to Ralph Erdrich, a German-American, and Rita (née Gourneau), an Ojibwe woman of French descent. Both parents taught at a boarding school in Wahpeton, North Dakota, set up by the Bureau of Indian Affairs. Erdrich's maternal grandfather, Patrick Gourneau, served as tribal chairman for the federally recognized tribe of Turtle Mountain Band of Chippewa Indians for many years. Though not raised in a reservation, she often visited relatives there. She was raised "with all the accepted truths" of Catholicism.

While Erdrich was a child, her father paid her a nickel for every story she wrote. Her sister, Heid, became a poet and publishes under the name Heid E. Erdrich. She also lives in Minnesota. Their sister Lise Erdrich has written children's books and collections of fiction and essays.

Erdrich attended Dartmouth College from 1972 to 1976. She was a part of the first class of women admitted to the college and earned a B.A. in English. During her first year, Erdrich met Michael Dorris, an anthropologist, writer, and then-director of the new Native American Studies program. While attending Dorris's class, she began to look into her own ancestry, which inspired her to draw from it for her literary work, such as poems, short stories, and novels. During that time, she worked as a lifeguard, waitress, researcher for films, and as an editor for the Boston Indian Council newspaper The Circle. In addition to these other early career experiences, she also taught poetry and was an aide in a hospital for a period of time.

In 1978, Erdrich enrolled in a Master of Arts program at Johns Hopkins University in Baltimore, Maryland. She earned the Master of Arts in the Writing Seminars in 1979. Erdrich later published some of the poems and stories she wrote while in the M.A. program. She returned to Dartmouth as a writer-in-residence.

After graduating from Dartmouth, Erdrich remained in contact with Dorris. He attended one of her poetry readings, became impressed with her work, and developed an interest in working with her. Although Erdrich and Dorris were on two different sides of the world, Erdrich in Boston and Dorris in New Zealand for field research, the two began to collaborate on short stories.

The pair's literary partnership led them to a romantic relationship. They married in 1981, and raised three children whom Dorris had adopted as a single parent (Reynold Abel, Madeline, and Sava) and three biological children together (Persia, Pallas, and Aza Marion). Reynold Abel suffered from fetal alcohol syndrome and in 1991, at age 23, he was killed when he was hit by a car.

In 1995, their son Sava accused Dorris of committing child abuse. Dorris and Erdrich separated in 1995, and divorced in 1996. In 1997, after Dorris's death by suicide, his adopted daughter Madeline claimed that Dorris had sexually abused her also and that Erdrich had neglected to stop the abuse. Dorris's will omitted Erdrich, Sava, and Madeline.

In 2001, at age 47, Erdrich gave birth to a daughter, Azure, whose Native American father Erdrich declines to identify publicly. She discusses her pregnancy with Azure, and Azure's father, in her 2003 nonfiction book, Books and Islands in Ojibwe Country. She uses the name "Tobasonakwut" to refer to him. He is described as a traditional healer and teacher, who is eighteen years Erdrich's senior and a married man. In a number of publications, Tobasonakwut Kinew, who died in 2012, is referred to as Erdrich's partner and the father of Azure.

When asked in an interview if writing is a lonely life for her, Erdrich replied, "Strangely, I think it is. I am surrounded by an abundance of family and friends and yet I am alone with the writing. And that is perfect." Erdrich lives in Minneapolis.

== Work ==
In 1979, she wrote "The World's Greatest Fisherman", a short story about June Kashpaw, a divorced Ojibwe woman whose death by hypothermia brought her relatives home to a fictional North Dakota reservation for her funeral. She wrote this while "barricaded in the kitchen." At her husband's urging, she submitted it to the Nelson Algren Short Fiction competition in 1982, where it won the $5,000 prize. It later became the first chapter of her debut novel, Love Medicine, published by Holt, Rinehart, and Winston in 1984.

"When I found out about the prize I was living on a farm in New Hampshire near the college I'd attended," Erdrich told an interviewer. "I was nearly broke and driving a car with bald tires. My mother knitted my sweaters, and all else I bought at thrift stores ... The recognition dazzled me. Later, I became friends with Studs Terkel and Kay Boyle, the judges, toward whom I carry a lifelong gratitude. This prize made an immense difference in my life."

Love Medicine won the 1984 National Book Critics Circle Award. It is the only debut novel ever to receive that honor. Erdrich later turned Love Medicine into a tetralogy that includes The Beet Queen (1986), Tracks (1988), and The Bingo Palace (1994). It has also been featured on the National Advanced Placement Test for Literature.

In the early years of their marriage, Erdrich and Michael Dorris often collaborated on their work, saying they plotted the books together, "talk about them before any writing is done, and then we share almost every day, whatever it is we've written" but "the person whose name is on the books is the one who's done most of the primary writing." They got started with "domestic, romantic stuff" published under the shared pen name of "Milou North" (Michael + Louise + where they live).

During the publication of Love Medicine, Erdrich produced her first collection of poems, Jacklight (1984), which highlights the struggles between Native and non-Native cultures, as well as celebrating family, ties of kinship, autobiographical meditations, monologues, and love poetry. She incorporates elements of Ojibwe myths and legends. Erdrich continues to write poems, which have been included in her collections.

Erdrich is best known as a novelist, and has published a dozen award-winning and best-selling novels. She followed Love Medicine with The Beet Queen (1986), which continued her technique of using multiple narrators and expanded the fictional reservation universe of Love Medicine to include the nearby town of Argus, North Dakota. The action of the novel takes place mostly before World War II. Leslie Marmon Silko accused Erdrich's The Beet Queen of being more concerned with postmodern technique than with the political struggles of Native peoples.

Tracks (1988) goes back to the early 20th century at the formation of the reservation. It introduces the trickster figure of Nanapush, who owes a clear debt to Ojibwe figure Nanabozho. There are many studies of the trickster figure in Erdrich's novels. Tracks shows early clashes between traditional ways and the Catholic Church. The Bingo Palace (1994), set in the 1980s, describes the effects of a casino and a factory on the reservation community. Tales of Burning Love (1997) finishes the story of Sister Leopolda, a recurring character from all the previous books, and introduces a new set of European-American people into the reservation universe.

The Antelope Wife (1998), Erdrich's first novel after her divorce from Dorris, was the first of her novels to be set outside the continuity of the previous books. Erdrich heavily revised the book in 2009 and published the revision as The Antelope Woman in 2016. Her 2010 work, Shadow Tag, is said to be inspired by the fall out and eventual divorce of their marriage.

She subsequently returned to the reservation and nearby towns. She has published five novels since 1998 dealing with events in that fictional area. Among these are The Last Report on the Miracles at Little No Horse (2001) and The Master Butchers Singing Club (2003). Both novels have geographic and character connections with The Beet Queen. In 2009, Erdrich was a Pulitzer Prize finalist for The Plague of Doves and a National Book Award finalist for The Last Report on the Miracles at Little No Horse. The Plague of Doves focuses on the historical lynching of four Native people wrongly accused of murdering a White family, and the effect of this injustice on the following generations. Her Pulitzer Prize–winning novel The Night Watchman (2020) concerns a campaign to defeat the 'termination bill' (introduced by Senator Arthur Vivian Watkins). Erdrich acknowledged her sources and its inspiration being her maternal grandfather's life. Her most recent novel, The Sentence, tells the fictional story of a haunting at Erdrich's Minneapolis bookstore, set against the backdrop of the COVID-19 pandemic, George Floyd's murder, and the resulting protests.

She also writes for younger audiences; she has a children's picture book Grandmother's Pigeon, and her children's book The Birchbark House was a National Book Award finalist. Erdrich illustrated many of the images in The Birchbark House, using animals and objects from her home and photographs of her children and relatives as reference. The crow, Andeg, in The Birchbark House was modeled on a real crow her family raised. She continued the series with The Game of Silence, winner of the Scott O'Dell Award for Historical Fiction, The Porcupine Year, Chickadee, and Makoons.

=== Nonfiction and teaching ===
In addition to fiction and poetry, Erdrich has published nonfiction. The Blue Jay's Dance (1995) is about her pregnancy and the birth of her third child. Books and Islands in Ojibwe Country (2003) traces her travels in northern Minnesota and Ontario's lakes following the birth of her youngest daughter.

=== Influence and style ===
Her heritage is influential in her life and prominent in her work. Although many of Erdrich's works explore her Native American heritage, her novel The Master Butchers Singing Club (2003) featured the European, specifically German, side of her ancestry. The novel includes stories of a World War I veteran of the German Army and is set in a small North Dakota town. The novel was a finalist for the National Book Award.

Erdrich's interwoven series of novels have drawn comparisons with William Faulkner's Yoknapatawpha novels. Like Faulkner's, Erdrich's successive novels created multiple narratives in the same fictional area and combined the tapestry of local history with current themes and modern consciousness.

== Birchbark Books ==
Erdrich's bookstore hosts literary readings and other events. Her new works are read here, and events celebrate the works and careers of other writers as well, particularly local Native writers. Erdrich and her staff consider Birchbark Books to be a "teaching bookstore". In addition to books, the store sells Native American art and traditional medicines, and Native American jewelry. Wiigwaas Press, a small nonprofit publisher founded by Erdrich and her sister, is affiliated with the store.

== Awards ==
=== Literary prizes ===
- 1983 Pushcart Prize in Poetry
- 1984 National Book Critics Circle Award for Fiction for Love Medicine
- 1984 Sue Kaufman Prize for First Fiction for Love Medicine
- 1984 Virginia McCormick Scully Literary Award for Best Book of 1984 dealing with Indians or Chicanos for Love Medicine
- 1985 Los Angeles Times Book Prize for Fiction, Love Medicine
- 1987 O. Henry Award for the short story "Fleur" (published in Esquire, August 1986)
- 1999 World Fantasy Award—Novel for The Antelope Wife
- 2006 Scott O'Dell Award for Historical Fiction for the children's book "The Game of Silence"
- 2009 Anisfield-Wolf Book Award for Plague of Doves
- 2012 National Book Award for Fiction for The Round House
- 2013 Scott O'Dell Award for Historical Fiction for Chickadee
- 2014 Dayton Literary Peace Prize, Richard C. Holbrooke Distinguished Achievement Award
- 2016 National Book Critics Circle Award for Fiction for LaRose
- 2021 Pulitzer Prize for Fiction for The Night Watchman
- 2023 Prix Femina étranger for The Sentence (its French translation La Sentence)
- 2025 Nomination for Minnesota Book Award in the Novel & Short Story category for The Mighty Red

=== Honors ===
- 1975 American Academy of Poets Prize
- 1980 MacDowell Fellowship
- 1985 Guggenheim Fellowship in Creative Arts
- 2000 Lifetime Achievement Award from the Native Writers' Circle of the Americas
- 2005 Associate Poet Laureate of North Dakota
- 2007 Honorary Doctorate from the University of North Dakota; refused by Erdrich because of her opposition to the university's North Dakota Fighting Sioux mascot
- 2009 Honorary Doctorate (Doctor of Letters) from Dartmouth College
- 2009 Kenyon Review Award for Literary Achievement
- 2013 Rough Rider Award
- 2014 PEN/Saul Bellow Award for Achievement in American Fiction
- 2015 Library of Congress Prize for American Fiction
- 2022 Berresford Prize for significant contributions to the advancement and care of artists in society
- 2025 New York Public Library Library Lion award.
- 2026 Dorothy and Lillian Gish Prize

== See also ==
- List of Indigenous writers of the Americas
- Joy Harjo
- Terese Marie Mailhot
