= The Porcupine Year =

2008 novel by Louise Erdrich

- Author: Louise Erdrich
- Audio read by: Christina Moore
- Series: "The Birchbark Series"
- Publisher: Harper Collins
- Publication date: 2008
- Publication place: United States
- ISBN: 9780064410304
- Preceded by: The Game of Silence (2005)
- Followed by: Chickadee (2012)

The Porcupine Year is a 2008 novel by Louise Erdrich. It is the third novel in "The Birchbark House" series that began with The Birchbark House. It continues to follow the family of the Ojibwe girl Omakayas ("little frog").

Leanne Betasamosake Simpson has noted the importance of the novel including the character Two Strikes, who "clearly demonstrates that difference and diversity" in gender norms "were both valued and fostered within Nishnaabeg practices. Two Strikes, while identified in the novels as a girl, takes up the responsibilities of hunting, trapping, and physically defending the family from a young age". She also argued, however, that "Two Strikes isn’t written as a particularly lovable character. She is bossy, obnoxious, and mean, and she is also strong, uncompromising, and persistent. I wish the one gender 'nonconforming' Nishnaabeg character my kid has read about was not written as someone who takes on the worst aspects of colonial masculinity as her queer identity".
