= The Bingo Palace =

1994 novel by Louise Erdrich

- Author: Louise Erdrich
- Language: English
- Series: Love Medicine
- Genre: Fiction
- Published: January 1st, 1994
- Publication place: United States

The Bingo Palace is a novel written by Louise Erdrich published in 1994, with three chapters appearing in the Georgia Review, The New Yorker, and Granta. It is the fourth novel in Erdrich's Love Medicine series, and it follows Lipsha Morrissey as he is summoned home by his grandmother Lulu Lamartine. He returns home to the reservation for the first time in years and finds himself in rapture of a woman named Shawnee Ray. The novel discusses themes of family and identity from an Anishinaabe perspective.

== Background ==
Erdrich wrote The Bingo Palace to coincide with the emergence of Indian gaming. As Erdrich wrote the Love Medicine series, several prominent legal cases such as Seminole Tribe v. Butterworth signaled a rise in American Indian gaming law. When reservation gaming became popular, Congress passed the Indian Gaming Regulatory Act in 1988. The act focused on three types of gaming—traditional Native games, games on electronic devices (including bingo), and card games. In the novel, Lyman plans to include these forms of gambling in his casino, "The Bingo Palace," in order to build wealth for the tribe.

== Setting ==
This novel takes place on a fictional reservation named Little No Horse as Lipsha Morrissey leaves his home in Fargo, North Dakota to return to the reservation after many years. The exact location of the reservation is unknown, but it is assumed to be located in North Dakota near the Great Lakes region.

== Characters ==
Lipsha Morrissey: He is the main character of the novel. He is returning to the reservation after many years of absence and becomes romantically involved with Shawnee Ray.

Lulu Lamartine: She is Lipsha's grandmother and the mother of Gerry Nanapush.

Gerry Nanapush: He is the father of Lipsha Morrissey.

Shawnee Ray Toose: She is the love interest of Lyman Lamartine and Lipsha Morrissey. She has a son with Lyman named Redford and lives with Zelda Kashpaw.

Lyman Lamartine: He is Lipsha's uncle and half brother. He and Lipsha are both in love with Shawnee Ray. He is Redford's father.

Redford: He is the son of Shawnee Ray and Lyman.

Zelda Kashpaw: She is the motherly figure to Shawnee Ray and Redford. She has a vested interest in Shawnee's love life.

Fleur Pillager: She is Lulu Lamartine's mother.

June: She is the deceased mother of Lipsha.

== Plot summary ==
A call from his grandmother Lulu brings Lipsha Morrisey home to the reservation after living with his father Gerry in Fargo. Once home, Lipsha soon falls in love with Shawnee Ray Toose, a dancer and designer who lives with Lipsha's aunt Zelda. Shawnee Ray is dating Lyman, Lipsha's entrepreneurial uncle, and the two have a child named Redford. This doesn't stop Lipsha from asking Shawnee Ray out on a date.

Lipsha and Shawnee Ray plan a date in Canada but are soon stopped by border police because of a pipe that belonged to Lipsha's grandfather Nector. Lyman goes to rescue the two and asks Lipsha for the pipe because of the historical value. When Lipsha refuses to give the pipe up, Lyman offers Lipsha a job at The Bingo Palace, a casino that he owns. Lipsha takes the job and is soon visited by his late mother June in a dream. She gives him bingo chips to use at the casino and drives off into the night.

Lipsha begins to play these chips and wins each time after playing bingo. He wins a van and a lot of money. Lipsha's relationship with Shawnee Ray is also going well. They have a romantic evening together, which leaves Lipsha more in love than he was before.

Lyman finally gets Lipsha to give him Nector's pipe only for him to gamble it away. Lyman's gambling addiction is something he keeps to himself. He begins planning to open a new resort on Matchimanito Lake, a piece of sacred tribal land. Lyman convinces Lipsha it would be a good idea to join him in this business opportunity.

Shawnee Ray begins to distance herself from Lipsha. He becomes depressed over this and finds himself on a vision quest. This quest leads him to a vision with a skunk telling him the plan for the resort on Matchimanito Lake will never have purpose as the land "is not real estate." Lipsha is confused as to where his life is going at this point.

After living with Zelda for months, Shawnee Ray is ready to live on her own with her son. Zelda tries to control everything Shawnee Ray and Redford do, and Shawnee Ray has had enough. She leaves for college with Redford suddenly and doesn't tell Lipsha.

Lipsha has another vision where he sees his father Gerry hiding after breaking out of prison. He goes to find him in Fargo, and they steal a car and drive into a blizzard. The two realize they accidentally kidnapped a baby that was in the backseat of the car. They're stuck in a blizzard when they see June drive in front of them. Gerry goes to be with June, leaving Lipsha taking care of a child in the middle of a snow storm.

== Major Themes ==
=== Gambling ===
According to Kristan Sarvé-Gorham, Erdrich comments on the rise of Native American gaming during the 1980s through Lyman and Lipsha. With the progression of legal actions, such as the Indian Gaming Regulatory Act of 1988, Lyman was able to have a successful casino. Lyman becomes addicted to gambling by playing the slot machines and soon sells Nector's pipe just to get money. Lipsha gambles in order to change his own luck but feels empty after each winning. As Sarvé-Gorham explains, Erdrich illustrates the dangers of gambling by focusing on the things Lyman and Lipsha did not gain from their pursuits surrounding the Bingo Palace.

=== Identity ===
Jonathan Wilson argues that Erdrich depicts the journey of self-discovery through the characters of Lipsha and Shawnee Ray. In writing about the novel, Wilson states that being an indigenous person in America means one "must adapt, but they must not lose connection with their culture and customs." This becomes difficult for the two characters. Throughout the novel, Lipsha ponders on who he is and how to make good decisions. His relationship with Shawnee Ray is a rollercoaster he isn't sure how to deal with. He begins to regret helping Lyman with the new casino after having a vision of a skunk telling him not to do it. He becomes depressed because of both events. For Shawnee Ray, she discovers that she needs her independence after living with Zelda. She chooses going to college over staying at the reservation with Lipsha in order to better her and Redford's lives.

=== Family ===
Critics including Wilson have also noted the novel's strong thematic commentary on familial relationships. As Sarvé-Gorman points out, even though Lyman is Lipsha's uncle, the two rarely agree. They occasionally reference their relationship as uncle and nephew, but they still fight over Shawnee Ray and Nector's pipe. Furthermore, writer Meldan Tanrisal argues that while Zelda isn't Shawnee Ray's biological mother, she assumes the mother role, using Shawnee Ray as a substitute for her own daughter Albertine who has gone to live in the city. This causes tension between the two as Zelda thinks she knows what's right for Shawnee Ray.

== Style ==
According to critic Rose Hsiu-Li Juan, the stylistic technique Erdrich uses in The Bingo Palace combines the magical realism of Anishinaabe culture with historical events. For example, characters such as Fleur are able to transform into animals when they need to. Animals also talk in the novel and deliver important messages to characters including Lipsha. Erdrich employs parallelism by linking the events in her book to historical events; for example, Kristan Sarvé-Gorham outlines how her motifs of gambling are directly correlated with the legalization of American Indian gambling.

== Public Reception ==
=== Popular ===
Pam Houston gives praise for the novel's “commitment to objective observation that records each emotional event entirely.” Houston also finds The Bingo Palace to be full of “stoic wisdom” and has the “honest and exquisite rhythms readers look for in Erdrich's prose.” Houston and other reviews agree that the novel is Erdrich's most exciting because of the character Lipsha's traditional wisdom that is mixed with his modern passion and love.

The Bingo Palace received criticism for the latter half of the novel and the role of the character Gerry. Michael Boylan takes issue with later chapters, claiming the ending to be “unsatisfactory,” and “does not fit with the story as presented earlier.” Lawrence Thornton criticized that Lipsha's journey in the novel is turned into “a wildly improbable madcap chase,” and “[skews] the novel's focus."

=== Scholarly ===
The novel was well received by Indigenous literature scholars for its use of Lipsha's struggle with the "tenets of Western ideology." Jonathan Wilson notes that Lipsha's struggle leads him into "circles of cultural/economic bankruptcy, rebirth, and eventually home." Emphasis is also given to the characters' redefining of home under the presence of forces like capitalism that merge or ostracize ideologies. Scholars such as John Carlos Rowe agree with Wilson and look to Erdrich's mixture of identity for his theories within Postcolonial literary studies. Rowe specifies that Erdrich's writing of Lipsha's struggle should be understood as "postcolonial studies in their own right."

== Publication history ==
A hardcover edition of the novel was published by HarperCollins in 1994.

The Harper Perennial edition was reissued in 2006 and 2017.

Prior to the novel's initial publication in 1994, three of the chapters appeared as short stories in the following:

- Chapter Seven as “The Bingo Van” in The New Yorker in February 1990.
- Chapter Twenty-four as “I'm a Mad Dog Biting Myself for Sympathy” in Granta in November 1990.
- Chapter Twelve as “Fleur's Luck” in the Georgia Review’s winter edition of 1993.
