= The Game of Silence =

2005 novel by Louise Erdrich

- Author: Louise Erdrich
- Series: "The Birchbark Series"
- Publication date: 2005
- Publication place: United States
- Awards: Scott O'Dell Award (2006)
- Preceded by: The Birchbark House (1999)
- Followed by: The Porcupine Year (2008); Chickadee (2012)

The Game of Silence is a 2005 novel by Louise Erdrich. It is the second novel in "The Birchbark" series that began with The Birchbark House. The two novels both feature the family of the Ojibwe girl Omakayas.

== Plot summary ==
The story picks up from the previous novel in 1850, when Omakayas is 9 years old and with the arrival of a group of Ojibwe refugees who have been driven off their land by the government. The title refers to the "game" that the elders use to keep the children quiet when the adults are having serious conversations, in this case, discussions with the refugees about how to interpret the government's actions and how to respond. The elders send four men on a year-long quest to uncover the causes of the government's hostility, only to learn that the answer is government rapacity and complete disregard for the Indians' rights. The story ends with Omakayas' people having to leave their home for new land out west.

Meanwhile, Omakayas is growing up and learning to control her spiritual gifts, including healing and communicating with the spirits, and learning the values of her community, such as that her gifts are to be used to help others, that individualism and the group can co-exist, and that it is better to patiently work with the White people rather than resist and lose their lives.

== Awards ==
- ALA Booklist Editors’ Choice Winner
- ALA Notable Children's Book Winner
- Horn Book Fanfare Winner
- Kirkus Reviews Editors’ Choice Winner
- New York Times Notable Winner
- Scott O'Dell Award for Historical Fiction Winner
