= Love Medicine =

Novel by Louise Erdrich

- First edition
- Author: Louise Erdrich
- Language: English
- Series: Love Medicine #1
- Subject: Ojibwe Family Life in Minnesota and North Dakota
- Genre: Contemporary Native American Fiction & Family Saga
- Publisher: Holt, Rinehart, and Winston; HarperCollins (rev. ed.)
- Publication date: 1984; 1993 (rev. ed.); 2009 (rev. ed.)
- Publication place: United States
- Media type: Print (hardcover, paperback)
- Pages: 275 pp. 367 pp. (rev. ed. paperback)
- ISBN: 9780030706110 (hardcover 1st ed.)
- OCLC: 10483004
- Dewey Decimal: 813
- LC Class: PS3555.R42 L6 2009

Love Medicine is Louise Erdrich's debut novel, first published in 1984 by Holt. Erdrich revised and expanded the novel in subsequent 1993 and 2009 editions. The book follows the lives of five interconnected Ojibwe families living on fictional reservations in Minnesota and North Dakota. The collection of short stories in the book spans six decades from the 1930s to the 1980s. Love Medicine garnered critical praise and won numerous awards, including the 1984 National Book Critics Circle Award.

== Plot summary ==
Love Medicine follows the intertwining lives of three central families, the Kashpaws, Lamartines, and Morrisseys, and two peripheral families, the Pillagers and the Lazarres. Members of the families variously reside on the fictional Ojibwe reservations of Little No Horse and Hoopdance, and in Minneapolis-St.Paul and Fargo. Erdrich employs a non-linear format in Love Medicine, and each chapter is told from the point of view of a different character, using first-person and third-person limited narration.

Love Medicine begins with June Morrissey freezing to death on her way home on Easter Sunday, 1981, and ends in 1985, with the reunification of June's former husband, Gerry Nanapush, with June and Gerry's son, Lipsha. Encapsulated between those two chapters are interrelated stories that proceed in loosely chronological order from 1934 onwards. A pair of stories at the midpoint of the novel converge on a single day in the lives of Lulu Lamartine, Marie Lazarre, and Nector Kashpaw, who are involved in a love triangle.

== Characters ==
Family Tree

                     Rushes Bear (Margaret)====Kashpaw
                                   ________|_________
                                  |                  |
           Marie Lazarre=.=.= Nector Kashpaw     Eli Kashpaw
      ____________________|_________________         !
     |         |          |        |        |        !
   Patsy    Eugene     Aurelia     |    Gordie =.=.=June.....................Gerry
  Kashpaw   Kashpaw    Kashpaw     |    Kashpaw  |  Morrissey       |       Nanapush
                                 Zelda           |          Lipsha Morrissey
                                 Kashpaw         |
                                   |        King Kashpaw =.=.=Lynette
                          Albertine Johnson                |
                                                       King Jr.

Legend

= = = Traditional Ojibwe Marriage

......... Sexual affair or Liaison

=.=.=. Catholic Marriage

| Children born from the above unions

! Adopted Children

== Major themes ==
The diversity of critical and theoretical approaches to Love Medicine reflects the book's complexity as a meeting site for multiple forms and conventions. The most prominent themes of the novel are those that are relevant to various literatures and discourses, such as contemporary Native American literature, post modernism, realism, oral storytelling, folklore, and mythology.

=== Identity and mythology ===
In the vein of contemporary Native American literatures, many characters in Love Medicine are in search of an identity. David Treuer identifies "the search for cultural reconnection" as a driving force of Native American fiction, arguing that "self-recovery is achieved through cultural recovery." Speaking of her own mixed-blood heritage, Erdrich has explained in an interview that "one of the characteristics of being a mixed blood is searching…all of our searches involve trying to discover where we are from." Louis Owens and Catherine Rainwater have noted that the positionality of Native Americans and writers both coincide on the margins, as people that must observe from the outside. Owens states that "the seemingly doomed Indian, or tortured mixed-blood caught between worlds surfaces in Erdrich's fiction, but such characters tend to disappear behind those other, foregrounded characters who hang on in spite of it all […] and, like a story teller, weave a fabric of meaning and significance out of the remnants."

To illustrate Indigenous cultural endurance, Erdrich superimposes Ojibwe mythological narratives and images onto her characters. Owens identifies Nanabozho, a peripatetic trickster and world-creator, as a key intertextual reference in Erdrich's text. Owens points to the first chapter of Love Medicine: true to traditional trickster narratives, in the beginning of Love Medicine, June Kashpaw is seen without a home and on the move. If the purpose of telling Nanabozho stories is to challenge listeners and to obversely remind them of their roots, Owens argues, then the purpose of June's absence in Love Medicine is to underscore each character's enduring place within the tribal community. Furthermore, in Owen's formulation, Just as the trickster transcends time and space, June's death, which occurs on Easter Sunday, disrupts linear Christian time and interweaves it with cyclic/accretive time.

Finally, Owens states that the mythic principle of Nanabozho is made explicit in the Nanapush family name; the revealed patrilineal link between Gerry Nanapush, a fugitive culture hero seemingly capable of shape shifting, and Lipsha, who always has a few tricks up his sleeve, ensures the transmission and survival of Indigenous values in the text.

=== Land and tribal identity ===
Meditations on land as a formative and nurturing source of tribal identity feature prominently in Love Medicine. For example, Uncle Eli, with his deep connections to the land, is described as being healthy and robust in his old age, unlike his senile brother Nector, who grew up off-reservation. The primacy of land finds formal expression in Louise Erdrich's artistic manifesto, "Where I Ought to Be: A Writer's Sense of Place." In it, Erdrich articulates a traditional tribal view of place, where generations of families inhabit the same land, and in doing so, imbue the landscape with history, identity, myth and reality. Erdrich contrasts this relationship with Western culture's mutable, progressive view of geography: "nothing, not even land, can be counted on to stay the same." Western literature's alienation from place, in Erdrich's view, is marked by the impulse to document change in the face of an ever-present threat of nuclear annihilation. She explains how American Indian writers write from a different position: for them, "the unthinkable has already happened," and as such, their task is to reconstitute a new birthing place that is capable of "[telling] the stories of contemporary survivors while protecting and celebrating the cores of cultures left in the wake of the catastrophe."

=== Indigenous humor and survival ===
In multiple interviews, Erdrich has commented on the importance of humor as a mechanism for Indigenous survival and resistance. She states: "when it's survival humor, you learn to laugh at things […] it's a different way of looking at the world, very different from the stereotype, the stoic, unflinching Indian standing, looking at the sunset." William Gleason argues that in Love Medicine, humor works by cropping up at "inappropriate" moments, thereby posing a greater question of belonging. Gleason's examples of out-of-place humor include Nector's tragicomic death and Gordie's telling of the Norwegian joke in "The World's Greatest Fisherman," as King is heard physically threatening his spouse outside. In light of the historical "unthinkable" perpetrated against Native communities, Gleason quotes from various theorists to point to the regenerative effect of laughter. It is Lipsha's comical take on the world that allows him to endure heartache and eventually realize that "belonging was a matter of deciding to." According to Gleason, jokes can also take on an explicitly subversive, if not emancipatory, dimension when they invoke Native American mythology. He identifies Heyoka, a literally and metaphorically backwards facing contrarian jester, and Nanabhozo, a wisecracking trickster, as two incarnations of pan-Indian characters that thrive on jokes. Various characters selectively exhibit different aspects of Heyoka and Nanabhozo in the novel: Lipsha complains of his head being "screwed on backwards," in response to a startling revelation from his grandmother, while Marie employs trickery and dark, aggressive wit to survive in the convent. Gleason argues that laughter isn't simply a product of Indigenous longevity in Love Medicine, but rather a key component of it.

=== Home and belonging ===
Noting how Love Medicine ends with the word "home," and how every character in the novel has a different idea of what home is, Robert Silberman argues that "home […] is an embattled concept, as ambiguous as June Kashpaw's motives in attempting her return;" June's interrupted homecoming is the subtext that haunts the entirety of the novel; simultaneously, her family members each express a desire for a home of their own. While homecoming is a common theme in Native American literatures, Silberman notes that the way Love Medicine engages with the subject evades easy classification, since home represents freedom for some, but entrapment for others. In his essay, Greg Sarris superimposes such ambiguity and anxiety surrounding homecoming onto moments of his own personal life to explore a possible reading of text that transcends Native borders. Unlike Catherine Rainwater, who views the experience of reading Love Medicine as a kind of permanent unhoming arising out of irresolvable conflicts between opposing codes, Sarris focuses on Albertine's return to the reservation and Lipsha's return to his familial roots to illustrate how his own personal relationship with home is simultaneously made universal and particular through an encounter with text.

== Style ==
Considerable attention has been devoted to the varied genres and forms that Erdrich employs in Love Medicine, and how they interact with each other. Kathleen Sands describes Love Medicine as a metafictional novel that consists of "hard edges, multiple voices, disjointed episodes, erratic tone shifts […] incomplete memories" that are spliced together in a self-reflexive manner. According to Sands, the novel is concerned as much with the process of storytelling as with the story itself. Hertha D. Sweet Wong, on the other hand, questions whether Love Medicine can be considered a novel at all. Instead, Wong quotes Robert Luscher's definition of "the short story sequence": "a volume of stories, collected and organized by their author, in which the reader successively realizes underlying patterns of coherence." Yet, Wong argues, even that definition fails to adequately capture the inherent nonlinearity of Native American narratives, which are often multivocal and achronological. Consequently, Wong arrives at a description of Love Medicine as a "web" of short stories that is "informed by both modernist literary strategies (for instance, multiple narrative voices) and oral traditions(such as a storyteller's use or repetition, recurrent development, and associational structure)."

=== Oral form ===
Hertha D. Sweet Wong points to Erdrich's simulation of Indigenous oral forms in her short story "webs" as a key narrative innovation. Wong argues that the egalitarian pluralism that is embedded in Native American oral traditions offers new artistic possibilities for writers of multivocal narratives; what was experienced, under conventional post-modern explanations, as an alienation from both self and society, and the indeterminacy of language, can now be reimagined as a vivacious expression multivocal unity.

Kathleen Sands further refines critical understanding of the oral form in Love Medicine as a competition between personal narratives: no one voice demonstrates a privileged relationship with the truth, and readers can only catch a glimpse of the real story by "puzzling right along with them [the personal narratives] to the end." Sands writes, "the source of her [Erdrich's] story telling technique is the secular anecdotal narrative process of community gossip, the storytelling sanction toward proper behavior that works so effectively in Indian communities to identify membership in the group and ensure survival of group values and its valued individuals […] Gossip affirms identity, provides information, and binds the absent to the family and the community."

On a contrasting note, citing a bias towards culturalism in the textual critiques of Hertha Sweet Wong and Paula Gunn Allen, Ojibwe writer and literary critic David Treuer cautions against imposing unqualified notions of Native American "polyvocality" and narrative egalitarianism on the text of Love Medicine. Treuer argues that the what readers experience as "polyvocality" is actually a proliferation of personal symbols, and that on the level of language, all the narrators of Love Medicine, in fact, inhabit the same consciousness. Treuer points to a tension between the "language of event," marked by stark naturalism, and the "language of thought," marked by rich symbolism and metaphors, and how all the chapters of Love Medicine "use a mixture of fact and fancy, a mixture of the figure and the figurative, to create its tensions and to resolve them." Thus, according to Treuer, Love Medicine is a product of literary techniques that derive predominantly from Western Fiction. Examining the opening chapter of Love Medicine, Treuer notes that beyond surface similarities, there is little that ties the text to well known Ojibwe Wenabozaho narratives. Treuer takes pain to note that he is not advocating for an understanding of Love Medicine that is devoid of Indigenous cultural context; to the contrary, Treuer argues, Erdrich's genius is in summoning an "idea of [Ojibwe] culture," and expressing Indigenous yearning for such culture, in a literary environment that is not its own.

=== Genres and literary traditions ===
For Helen Jaskoski, the "Saint Marie" chapter is notable for its reflexive use of Ojibwe Windigo stories to subvert a complex of European romance and fairytale allusions. An embodiment of winter starvation, the Windigo can take possession of human souls and cause cannibalistic cravings. In many stories the "Windigo meets defeat at the hands of a child […] who must become the Windigo herself in order to defeat the monster." Jaskoski points to several passages of "Saint Marie" where Marie demonstrates childlike intimacy with a supernatural being reminiscent of the Windigo, who is then metaphorically linked to Satan. Fittingly, in effort to counter Marie's intimacy with the devil, Sister Leopolda is seen variously hurling her "lance" and attempting to kick Marie into an oven, actions that, according to Jaskoski, are reminiscent of chivalric legend and fairytales such as "Hansel and Gretel," respectively. When Marie enters the convent, Jaskoski argues, she is the child that becomes the Windigo herself. She achieves symbolic victory over sister Leopolda when she catches a sense of the pitiful person at the core of Leopolda's persona, much like when the vanquishing heroines of Windigo stories discover a person hidden inside the monster's icy shell.

Robert Silberman redirects critique of Love Medicine back to Western Literary traditions, noting that at the end of the day, Love Medicine is printed and marketed as a novel. He writes: "the return to the literary is inevitable." Silberman and Catherine Rainwater both discuss how Love Medicine rises out of the Western family saga, and remains heavily indebted to its conventions. Silberman goes a step further and argues that the realism and naturalness of Erdrich's characters, as evinced in their colloquialisms and in their first-person present tense narrations, is "as much a construction as the skill at creating a convincing voice that led Hemingway to see in Twain's Huckleberry Finn the start of a genuine American literary tradition - an antiliterary, seemingly informal American style." Erdrich's "literary antinomianism" has no shortage of precedents, Silberman claims, from Faulkner to Raymond Carver.

=== Interpretative duality ===
James Ruppert and Catherine Rainwater argue that Native forms and Western Literary conventions bring with them opposing codes that make two entirely different interpretations of the same text possible. Ruppert and Rainwater cite multiple such examples: for example, it is entirely possible to read Henry Lamartine's story as either a tragic story about a soldier suffering from PTSD or a moral story about an Ojibwe warrior who is unable to escape the ghosts of his vanquished enemies. Likewise, Rainwater argues, Gordie's encounter with June's ghost is either a drunken hallucination or a metamorphosis of June's spirit that forces Gordie to confront his past abuses. In Rainwater's words, this in-between position requires that the reader "consider perceptual frameworks as the important structural principle in both textual and non-textual realms."

=== Structure ===
Regardless of differences in critical and theoretical approaches, many scholars such as Wong, Ownes, and Rainwater agree that there exists an underlying structure that link Love Medicine's stories together. On an intratextual level, Wong states, there exist many connective devices, from recurring symbolism to coinciding paths. Hertha D. Sweet Wong points out the loosely chiasmic structure of Love Medicine, where symmetrically positioned chapters mirror each other on subject matter. Wong, along with Owens, also notes that on an intertextual level, Love Medicine represents one component of a series of narrative sequences in the Love Medicine Sequence, with each narrative sequence being assigned its own natural element as a dominant image: Water (Love Medicine), Air (The Beet Queen), Earth (Tracks), and Fire (The Bingo Palace). This thematic scheme has been explained by Erdrich herself in multiple interviews.

== Background ==
While she was enrolled as a graduate student at Johns Hopkins University, Erdrich penned several short stories and poems and submitted them to publishers. Two of the stories that she penned, titled "Scales" and "The Red Convertible", later became chapters of Love Medicine. After sending both stories off to publishers, she and her then-husband, Michael Dorris, discussed merging and expanding upon those two stories which resulted in "The World's Greatest Fisherman", the opening chapter of Love Medicine. "The World's Greatest Fisherman" proceeded to win the Chicago Tribune's Nelson Algren Fiction Award. Erdrich and Dorris subsequently discussed expanding upon the characters of Nector, Marie, and Lulu. The short story "Scales", in particular, was inspired by her experience working as a weigher of commercial trucks. In several interviews, Erdrich and her then-husband described their creative relationship as one of primary writer (Erdrich) and editor/contributing writer (Dorris).

== Publication history ==
Critics such as Lorena Stookey have commented on Erdrich's unique view of publication as a means of providing the writer with "temporary storage," instead of a "final word." Erdrich has issued two major revisions of Love Medicine: one in 1993 and another 2009. The 1993 edition expanded upon the initial publication with four new chapters and a new section within the chapter entitled "The Beads". Erdrich also made revisions to her language in response to reader reactions to the sexual encounter in "Wild Geese". For the 25th anniversary edition, Erdrich decided to remove two chapters: "Lyman's Luck" and "The Tomahawk Factory". In the author's note, Erdrich reasoned that the two stories "interrupted the flow" of the final pages of the novel.

== Reception ==
Love Medicine has received a handful of awards since it was first published in 1984. Kurup and Wagner-Martin state that Love Medicine "catapulted [Erdrich] to the front of what Kenneth Lincoln describes as the 'Native American Renaissance' [...] Lincoln [...] suggested that she stands alongside the greats of American letters." In 1984, Love Medicine received the National Book Critics Circle Award for Fiction, the Sue Kaufman Prize for First Fiction from the American Academy and Institute of Arts and the Virginia McCormick Scully Award. In the following year, it went on to receive the Los Angeles Times Book Prize for Fiction, the American Book Award, and the Great Lakes Association Award for Best Work of Fiction. Marco Potales of The New York Times praised the book, stating "[...] this is a notable, impressive book of first fiction: the unique evocation of a culture in severe social ruin, yet still aglow with the privilege and power of access to the spirit-world."
