= List of Arab-American writers =

This is a list of Arab-American writers.

== Arab-American poets ==
- George Abraham (poet), of Palestinian descent
- Elia Abu Madi (1890–1957), Lebanese poet
- Etel Adnan (1925–2021), poet, essayist, and visual artist; Lebanese Albanian descent
- Joseph Awad (1929–2009), poet, painter, and worked in public relations; of Lebanese and Irish descent.
- Ibtisam Barakat (born 1963), bilingual author, poet, artist, translator, and educator; Palestinian descent.
- Sharif Elmusa, poet and editor
- Suheir Hammad (born 1973), poet, author, actress, performer, and political activist; of Palestinian descent
- Sam Hamod (1936–2021) poet, professor; of Lebanese descent
- Samuel John Hazo (born 1928), poet, playwright, fiction novelist, professor; of Assyrian and Lebanese descent
- Lawrence Joseph (born 1948), poet, writer, essayist, critic, lawyer, and professor of law; of Syrian and Lebanese descent
- Lisa Suhair Majaj (born 1960), poet and scholar.
- Jack Marshall (born 1936), poet and author; of Iraqi and Syrian descent
- Farid Matuk, poet; of Syrian descent
- Khaled Mattawa (born 1964), poet; of Libyan descent
- Jess Rizkallah, poet, writer, illustrator; of Lebanese descent
- Matthew Shenoda (born 1977), poet; of Egyptian descent
- Hedy Habra, poet, professor, fiction writer, literary critic and essayist; of Egyptian and Lebanese descent.

== Arab-American fiction writers ==
- Chelsea Abdullah (fl. 2022), Kuwait-born fantasy writer, author of the Sandsea Trilogy
- Elmaz Abinader (born 1954), author, playwright and activist; of Lebanese descent; PEN Oakland/Josephine Miles Literary Award recipient
- Susan Abulhawa (born 1970), fiction and nonfiction writer, author of Mornings in Jenin; of Palestinian descent
- Saladin Ahmed (born 1975), science fiction, comic book and fantasy author; of Lebanese, Egyptian, Irish, and Polish descent
- Hala Alyan (born 1986), writer, poet, and clinical psychologist, author of Salt Houses and The Arsonists' City; of Palestinian descent
- Dima Alzayat, fiction writer, author of Alligator and Other Stories; of Syrian descent
- William Peter Blatty (1928–2017), screenplay writer and novelist; of Lebanese descent
- Vance Bourjaily (1922–2010), novelist, playwright, journalist, creative writing teacher, and essayist
- Catherine Filloux, playwright; of Algerian and French descent
- Khalil Gibran (1883–1931), writer, poet and visual artist; of Lebanese descent
- Ray Hanania, columnist, stand-up comedian, reporter, editor, public relations firm owner; former Chicago City Hall reporter (1977 to 1992); of Palestinian descent
- Randa Jarrar (born 1978) writer, novelist, essayist, and Arabic-English translator; of Egyptian and Palestinian descent
- Zeyn Joukhadar, trans writer and former biomedical researcher; of Syrian descent
- Mohja Kahf (born 1967), is a poet, novelist, and professor; of Syrian descent
- Ismail Khalidi (born 1982), playwright, screenwriter and theater director; of Palestinian descent
- Laila Lalami (born 1968), novelist and essayist; of Moroccan descent
- Hisham Matar (born 1970), novelist, essayist, memoirist, and writer; of British and Libyan descent
- Claire Messud (born 1966), novelist and literature and creative writing professor; of Canadian and Algerian descent
- Susan Muaddi Darraj, essayist, writer; of Palestinian descent
- Mikha'il Na'ima (also known as Mikhail Naimy; 1889–1988), poet, novelist, and philosopher; Lebanese
- Naomi Shihab Nye (born 1952), poet, songwriter, and novelist; of Palestinian descent.
- Mahmoud Saeed (born 1939), novelist, essayist
- Mona Simpson (born 1957), novelist
- Adam al-Sirgany (born 1989), editor and short story writer; of Egyptian descent
- Thérèse Soukar Chehade, novelist; of Lebanese descent.

== Arab-American nonfiction writers and journalists ==
- Diana Abu-Jaber, food history, of Jordanian and Palestinian descent
- Hakim Almasmari, journalist, publisher, editor; of Yemeni descent
- Moustafa Bayoumi (born 1958), history writer, academic; of Egyptian descent
- Chawky Frenn, painter, professor, writer of books on artists
- Afifa Karam (1883–1924), journalist, novelist, and translator; of Lebanese descent
- Rashid Khalidi (born 1948), historian of the Middle East; of Palestinian descent
- Daoud Kuttab (born 1955), journalist; Palestinian
- Saree Makdisi (born 1964), literary critic; of Palestinian and Lebanese descent
- Eugene Paul Nassar (1935–2017), editor, professor, and literary critic; of Lebanese descent
- Gregory Orfalea (born 1949), essayist, historian and poet; of Syrian and Lebanese descent
- Amin al-Rihani (Ameen Rihani; 1876–1940) writer, intellectual and political activist; part of the mahjar literary movement; of Lebanese descent.
- Abraham Mitrie Rihbany (1869–1944), theologian, philologist and historian; of Lebanese descent
- Salom Rizk (1908–1973), author, best known for his 1943 immigration-themed autobiography; of Lebanese descent
- Edward Said (1935–2003), writer, professor of literature, a founder of the academic field of postcolonial studies; of Palestinian descent
- Steven Salaita (born 1975), academic writer, and historian; of Jordanian and Palestinian descent
- Anthony Shadid (1968–2021), foreign news correspondent; of Lebanese descent.
- Evelyn Shakir (1938–2010), literary scholar; a pioneer in the study of Arab American literature; of Lebanese descent.

== See also ==
- Arab American Book Award
- Before Columbus Foundation
- Kawkab America
- The Society for the Study of the Multi-Ethnic Literature of the United States

== Bibliography ==
Grape Leaves: A Century of Arab-American Poetry, edited by Gregory Orfalea and Sharif Elmusa, 1988, University of Utah Press.
