= Arab American Book Award =

Annual literary award

- First award: 2006
- Final award: Active
- Website: arabamericanmuseum.org/book-awards/

The Arab American Book Award, established in 2006, is an annual literary award to celebrate and support the research of, and the written work of, Arab Americans and their culture. The Arab American Book Award encourages the publication and excellence of books that preserve and advance the understanding, knowledge, and resources of the Arab American community by celebrating the thoughts and lives of Arab Americans. The purpose of the Award is to inspire authors, educate readers and foster a respect and understanding of the Arab American culture.

The Arab American Book Award was brought about by the Arab American National Museum and faculty members of the nearby University of Toledo. The winning titles are chosen by groups of selected readers including respected authors, university professors, artists and AANM staff. The Awards are given during an invitation only event in the Fall of the award year. The AANM first gave these awards in 2007 for books published in 2006; for 2007, the number of submissions more than doubled from the inaugural year.

To help ensure the continuity of the Arab American Book Award a special endowment fund has been launched with a $10,000 gift from Drs. A. Adnan and Barbara C. Aswad. Dr. Barbara C. Aswad is Professor Emerita of Anthropology at Wayne State University in Detroit, Michigan and a past president of the Middle Eastern Studies Association and a Board Member Emerita for the Arab Community Center for Economic and Social Services (ACCESS), parent organization of the Arab American National Museum. Dr. A. Adnan Aswad is Professor Emeritus of Engineering at the University of Michigan–Dearborn. The Aswads, now based in Los Angeles, were inspired to make the gift after the inaugural Book Award ceremony in Fall 2007.

In 2011, the non-fiction prize was renamed to honor the legacy and contributions to Arab American scholarship of Evelyn Shakir, who died of breast cancer in 2010. In addition to winning the Arab American Book Award for Fiction in 2008, Professor Shakir extensively researched the history of Arab women and wrote the groundbreaking work Bint Arab: Arab and Arab American Women in the United States in 1997. Evelyn's longtime partner, poet George Ellenbogen, established the award in collaboration with the Arab American National Museum.

== Chronology change (2009) ==
In 2009, The Arab American Book Award Committee changed the name of the '2008 Arab American Book Award' to the '2009 Arab American Book Award' in order to reflect the true award date instead of the publication date of the winning books. All dates in the previous Award years were also changed retroactively. While the date within the Award name has changed, the rules regarding the publication dates for eligible submissions have not.

== Award recipients ==
=== Adult fiction ===
Winners and honorable mentions in Adult fiction
Year	Author(s)	Title	Result	Ref.
2007	Hisham Matar	In the Country of Men	Winner	
2008	Evelyn Shakir	Remember Me to Lebanon	Winner	
2008	Diana Abu-Jaber	Origin	Honorable mention	
2009	Randa Jarrar	A Map of Home: A Novel	Winner	
2010	Etel Adnan	Master of the Eclipse: And Other Stories	Winner	
2011	Thérèse Soukar Chehade	Loom: a Novel	Winner	
2012	Diana Abu-Jaber	Birds of Paradise	Winner	
2012	Hisham Matar	Anatomy of a Disappearance	Honorable mention	
2013	Joseph Geha	Lebanese Blonde	Winner	
2013	Hedy Habra	Flying Carpets	Honorable mention	
2014	Sinan Antoon	The Corpse Washer	Winner	
2014	Claire Messud	The Woman Upstairs	Honorable mention	
2015	Rabih Alameddine	An Unnecessary Woman	Winner (tie)	
2015	Laila Lalami	The Moor's Account	Winner (tie)	
2016	Susan Muaddi Darraj	A Curious Land	Winner	
2016	Rajia Hassib	In the Language of Miracles	Honorable mention	
2017	Rabih Alameddine	The Angel of History	Winner	
2017	Mona Awad	13 Ways of Looking at a Fat Girl	Honorable mention	
2018	Hala Alyan	Salt Houses	Winner	
2019	Lena Mahmoud	Amreekiya	Winner	
2020	Laila Lalami	The Other Americans	Winner	
2020	Etaf Rum	A Woman is No Man	Honorable mention	
2021	Susan Abulhawa	Against the Loveless World	Winner	
2021	Dima Alzayat	Alligator And Other Stories	Honorable mention	
2022	Eman Quotah	Bride of the Sea	Winner	
2023	Chelsea Abdullah	The Stardust Thief	Winner (tie)	
2023	Noor Naga	If an Egyptian Cannot Speak English	Winner (tie)	
2024	Deena Mohamed	Shubeik Lubeik	Winner	
2024	Ghassan Zeineddine	Dearborn	Honorable mention	
2025	Thérèse Soukar Chehade	We Walked On	Winner	

=== Evelyn Shakir Non-Fiction Award ===
Prior to 2011, this award was referred to primarily as the Non-Fiction Award.

Winners and honorable mentions in non-fiction
Year	Author(s)	Title	Result	Ref.
2007	Rashid Khalidi	The Iron Cage	Winner	
2007	Randa Kayyali	The Arab Americans	Honorable mention	
2007	Tim Jon Semmerling	“Evil” Arabs in American Popular Film	Honorable mention	
2008	John Tofik Karam	Another Arabesque	Winner	
2008	Raff Ellis	Kisses from a Distance	Honorable mention	
2008	Nawal Nasrallah	Annals of the Caliphs’ Kitchens	Honorable mention	
2009	Moustafa Bayoumi	How Does It Feel to Be a Problem?: Being Young and Arab in America	Winner	
2009	Fayeq Oweis	The Encyclopedia of Arab American Artists	Honorable mention	
2009	Saree Makdisi	Palestine Inside Out: An Everyday Occupation	Honorable mention	
2010	Gregory Orfalea	Angeleno Days: An Arab American Writer on Family, Place, and Politics	Winner	
2010	Louise Cainkar	Homeland Insecurity: The Arab American and Muslim American Experience After 9/11	Honorable mention	
2010	Alia Malek	A Country Called Amreeka: Arab Roots, American Stories.	Honorable mention	
2011	Samir Abu-Absi	Arab Americans in Toledo: Cultural Assimilation and Community Involvement edited	Winner	
2011	Manal M. Omar	Barefoot in Baghdad	Honorable mention	
2012	Rabab Abdulhadi, Evelyn Alsultany and Nadine Naber (eds.)	Arab and Arab-American Feminisms: Gender, Violence, & Belonging edited	Winner	
2012	Steven Salaita	Modern Arab-American Fiction: A Reader's Guide	Honorable mention	
2013	Anthony Shadid	House of Stone: A Memoir of Home, Family, and Lost Middle East	Winner	
2013	Sophia Al Maria	The Girl Who Fell to Earth	Honorable mention	
2013	Soha Al-Jurf	Even My Voice Is Silence	Honorable mention	
2014	Nadje Al-Ali and Deborah Al-Najjar	We Are Iraqis: Aesthetics and Politics in a Time of War edited	Winner	
2014	Evelyn Alsultany and Ella Shohat	Between the Middle East and the Americas: The Cultural Politics of Diaspora edited	Honorable mention	
2014	Laila el-Haddad and Maggie Schmitt	The Gaza Kitchen: A Palestinian Cultural Journey	Honorable mention	
2015	Sally Howell	Old Islam in Detroit: Rediscovering the Muslim American Past	Winner	
2016	Moustafa Bayoumi	This Muslim American Life: Dispatches from the War on Terror	Winner (tie)	
2016	Mona M. Amer and Germine H. Awad	Handbook of Arab American Psychology	Winner (tie)	
2017	Steven Salaita	Inter/Nationalism: Decolonizing Native America and Palestine	Winner	
2017	Hanan Hammad	Industrial Sexuality: Gender, Urbanization, and Social Transformation in Egypt	Honorable mention	
2018	Pamela E. Pennock	The Rise of the Arab-American Left: Activists, Allies, and Their Fight Against Imperialism and Racism, 1960s–1980s	Winner	
2018	Mehammed Amadeus Mack	Sexagon: Muslims, France, and the Sexualization of National Culture	Honorable mention	
2019	Oswaldo Truzzi	Syrian and Lebanese Patricios in São Paulo,	Winner	
2020	Massoud Hayoun	When We Were Arabs: A Jewish Family's Forgotten History	Winner (tie)	
2020	Stacy Fahrenthold	Between the Ottomans and the Entente: The First World War in the Syrian and Lebanese Diaspora, 1908-1925	Winner (tie)	
2020	Sherine Hafez	Women of the Midan: The Untold Stories of Egypt's Revolutionaries	Honorable mention	
2021	Sarah M.A. Gualtieri	Arab Routes: Pathways to Syrian California	Winner (tie)	
2021	Helen Zughaib and Elia Zughaib	Stories My Father Told Me	Winner (tie)	
2021	Sirène Harb	Articulations Of Resistance: Transformative Practices in Contemporary Arab American Poetry	Honorable mention	
2022	Mansoor Adayfe	Don't Forget Us Here	Winner (tie)	
2022	Zainab Saleh	Return to Ruin: Iraqi Narratives of Exile and Nostalgia	Winner (tie)	
2022	Michael W. Suleiman, Suad Joseph, and Louise Cainkar	Arab American Women: Representation and Refusal	Honorable mention	
2023	Edward E. Curtis IV	Muslims of the Heartland	Winner (tie)	
2023	Ghassan Zeineddine, Nabeel Abraham, and Sally Howell (Eds.)	Hadha Baladuna	Winner (tie)	
2023	Evelyn Alsultany	Broken: The Failed Promise of Muslim Inclusion	Honorable mention	
2023	Louise Cainkar, Pauline Homsi Vinson, and Amira Jarmakani (Eds.)	Sajjilu: A Reader in SWANA Studies	Honorable mention	
2023	Luma Mufleh	Learning America: One Woman's Fight for Educational Justice for Refugee Children	Honorable mention	
2024	Rhoda Kanaaneh	The Right Kind of Suffering: Gender, Sexuality, and Arab Asylum Seekers in America	Winner (tie)	
2024	Anna Lekas Miller	Love Across Borders: Passports, Papers, and Romance in a Divided World	Winner (tie)	
2024	Laila Halaby	The Weight of Ghosts	Honorable mention	
2024	Charlotte Karem Albrecht	Possible Histories: Arab Americans and the Queer Ecology of Peddling	Honorable mention	
2025	noam keim	The Land is Holy	Winner (tie)	
2025	Atef Shahat Said	Revolution Squared: Tahrir, Political Possibilities, and Counterrevolution in Egypt	Winner (tie)	
2025	Nadine Sinno	A War of Colors: Graffiti and Street Art in Postwar Beirut	Honorable mention	

=== Children's/Young Adult ===
Children's/Young Adult winners and honorable mentions
Year	Author(s)	Title	Result	Ref.
2007	Eve Bunting with Ted Lewin (illus.)	One Green Apple	Winner	
2008	Ibtisam Barakat	Tasting the Sky: A Palestinian Childhood	Winner	
2009	Naomi Shihab Nye	Honeybee: Poems & Short Prose	Winner	
2010	No winner			
2011	Diane Stanley	Saving Sky	Winner	
2011	Maha Addasi with Ned Gannon (illus.)	Time to Pray	Honorable mention	
2012	No winner			
2013	Karen Leggett Abouraya and Susan L. Roth	Hands Around the Library: Protecting Egypt's Treasured Books	Winner	
2013	Tahereh Mafi	Shatter Me	Honorable mention	
2014	Yvonne Wakim Dennis and Maha Addasi	Kids Guide to Arab American History	Winner	
2014	Saima S. Hussain	The Arab World Thought of It	Honorable mention	
2015	Naomi Shihab Nye	The Turtle of Oman	Winner	
2015	Elsa Marston with Claire Ewart (illus.)	The Olive Tree	Honorable mention	
2016	No Winner			
2017	Michelle Chalfoun	The Treasure of Maria Mamoun	Winner	
2017	Hayan Charara	The Three Lucys	Honorable mention	
2017	Ibtisam Barakat	Balcony on the Moon: Coming of Age in Palestine	Honorable mention	
2018	No Winner			
2019	Hoda Kotb	I’ve Loved You Since Forever	Winner	
2019	Somaiya Daud	Mirage	Honorable mention	
2020	Malaka Gharib	I Was Their American Dream: A Graphic Memoir	Winner	
2020	Jasmine Warga	Other Words for Home	Honorable mention	
2021	Aya Khalil with Anait Semirdzhyan (illus.)	The Arabic Quilt	Winner (tie)	
2021	Susan Muaddi Darraj	Farah Rocks Fifth Grade	Winner (tie)	
2022	Safia Elhillo	Home is Not a Country	Winner	
2023	Cathy Camper	Arab, Arab All Year Long!	Winner (C)	
2023	Rashida Tlaib, Adam Tlaib, and Miranda Paul	Mama in Congress: Rashida Tlaib's Journey to Washington	Honorable mention (C)	
2023	Nora Lester Murad	Ida in the Middle	Winner (YA)	
2023	Naomi Shihab Nye	The Turtle of Michigan	Honorable mention (YA)	
2024	Hannah Moushabeck	Homeland: My Father Dreams of Palestine	Winner (C)	
2024	Danny Ramadan	Salma Makes a Home	Honorable mention (C)	
2024	Alice Rothchild	Old Enough to Know	Winner (YA)	
2024	Rhonda Roumani	Tagging Freedom	Honorable mention (YA)	
2025	Maysa Odeh	A Map for Falasteen	Winner	
2025	Rifk Ebeid	Kamal’s Key	Honorable mention	

=== George Ellenbogen Poetry Award ===
Winners and honorable mentions in poetry
Year	Author(s)	Title	Result	Ref.
2009	Suheir Hammad	breaking poems	Winner	
2010	Dunya Mikhail	Diary of a Wave Outside the Sea	Winner	
2011	Khaled Mattawa	Tocqueville	Winner	
2011	Farid Matuk	This Is a Nice Neighborhood	Honorable mention	
2012	Philip Metres	Abu Ghraib Arias	Winner	
2012	Naomi Shihab Nye	Transfer	Honorable mention	
2013	Hala Alyan	Atrium	Winner	
2013	Etel Adnan	Sea and Fog	Honorable mention	
2014	Philip Metres	A Concordance of Leaves	Winner	
2014	Farid Matuk	My Daughter La Chola	Honorable mention	
2014	Fady Joudah	Alight	Honorable mention	
2015	Matthew Shenoda	Tahrir Suite: Poems	Winner	
2015	Samuel Hazo	And the Time Is: Poems, 1958–2003	Honorable mention	
2016	Nathalie Handal	The Republics	Winner	
2016	Philip Metres	Sand Opera	Honorable mention	
2017	Hayan Charara	Something Sinister	Winner	
2017	Lauren Camp	One Hundred Hungers	Honorable mention	
2017	Mohja Kahf	Hagar Poems	Honorable mention	
2018	Safia Elhillo	The January Children	Winner	
2018	Lena Khalaf Tuffaha	Water & Salt	Honorable mention	
2019	Fady Joudah	Footnotes in the Order of Disappearance	Winner	
2019	Noor Al-Samarrai	El Cerrito	Honorable mention	
2020	Zaina Alsous	A Theory of Birds	Winner	
2020	Marwa Helal	Invasive Species	Honorable mention	
2021	George Abraham	Birthright	Winner	
2021	Noor Naga	Washes, Prays	Honorable mention	
2022	Threa Almontaser	The Wild Fox of Yemen	Winner	
2022	Eli Tareq Bechelany-Lynch	The Good Arabs	Honorable mention	
2023	Zeina Hashem Beck	O	Winner	
2023	Noor Hindi	DEAR GOD. DEAR BONES. DEAR YELLOW.	Honorable mention	
2023	Lubna Safi	Your Blue and the Quiet Lament	Honorable mention	
2024	Kamelya Omayma Youssef	A book with a hole in it	Winner	
2024	Alise Alousi	What to Count	Honorable mention	
2024	Lena Khalaf Tuffaha	Kaan and her Sisters	Honorable mention	
2025	Lena Khalaf Tuffaha	Something About Living	Winner	
2025	Siwar Masannat	Cue	Honorable mention	

== See also ==
- List of Arab American writers
