= Arab American literature =

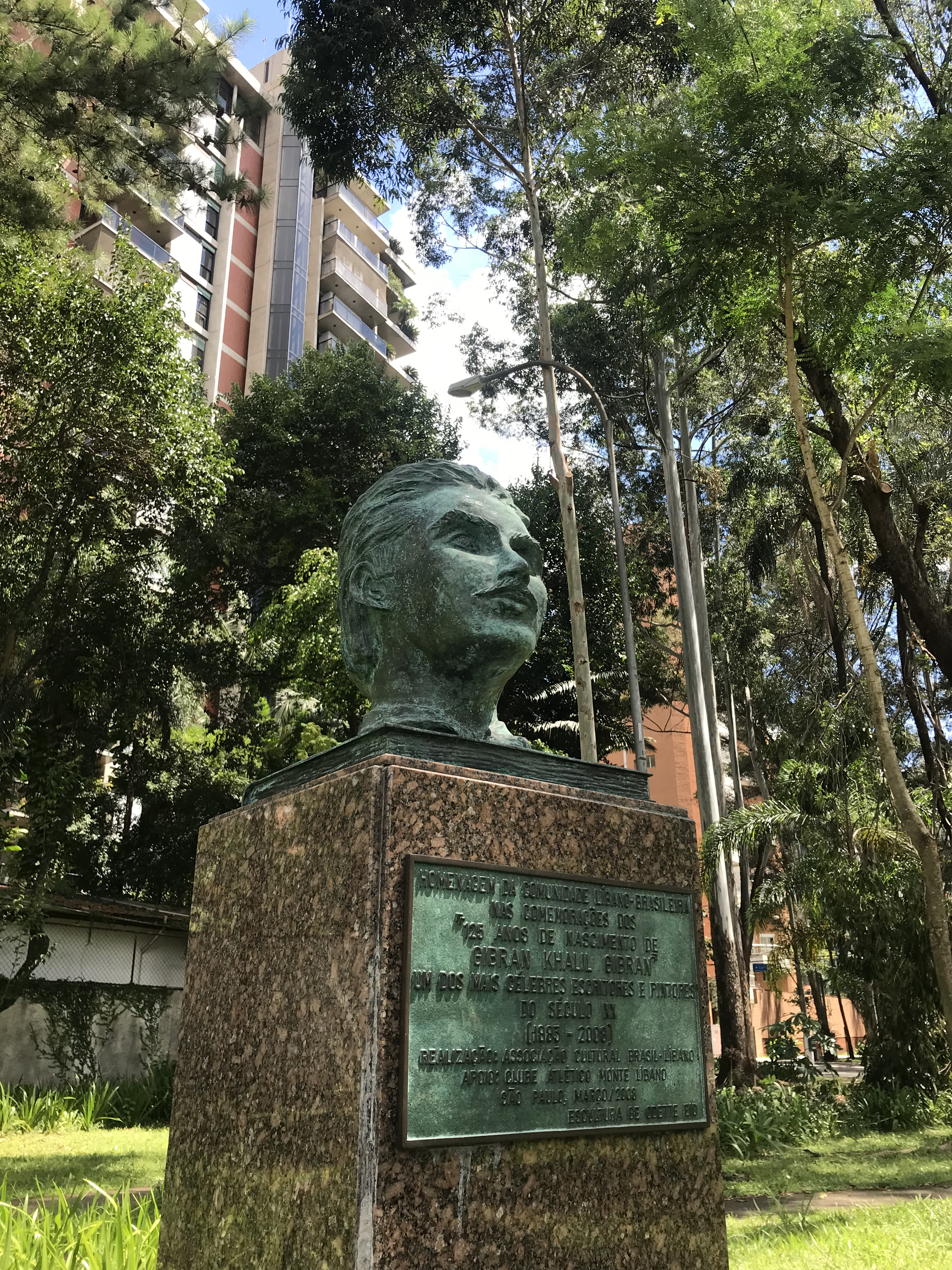
Statue of Lebanese-American writer Gibran Khalil Gibran in São Paulo, Brazil

Arab-American literature (or Arab American literature) is an ethnic American literature, comprising literary works by authors with Arab origins residing in the United States. The Arab diaspora has its beginnings in the late 19th century, when Arab groups from the Ottoman Empire moved to North America. This immigration occurred in three separate phases, with distinct themes, perspectives, style, and approach to Arab culture embedded in the literature created by each respective phase.

Literature from the earlier phases features struggles of assimilation and embracing Arab identity in an American society, and conversely features a sense of detachment from Arab culture for later generations born in the United States. Later generations also contained the major theme of homecoming; finding an intermediate identity that incorporates aspects of both their Arab origin and upbringing in American society.

As an ethnic literature, early Arab-American literature is not easily understandable to audiences without prior knowledge of Arab culture. Consequently, it lacks a global presence, and is not part of considerable literary discourse. Modern criticism on Arab-American literature focuses on the lack of analysis and criticism of this literature itself.

Some renowned authors include Gibran Khalil Gibran, Ameen Rihani and Fawzi Maalouf during the first wave of immigration (called the Mahjar group), Vance Bourjaily and William Peter Blatty for the second, and Diana Abu-Jaber and Suheir Hammad in modern-day Arab American literature.

== Historical background ==
The development Arab American literature underwent is strongly related to the historical and sociological factors that accompanied immigration to the United States. Academics have categorized Arab-American immigration into three waves, each characterized by different political conditions, levels of assimilation into U.S. society, and degree of involvement in the Arab world.

=== First wave (1880-1924) ===
The first Arab group to immigrate to the United States around 1880 consisted largely of Christians (Maronite, Greek Orthodox, and Melchite) from Mount Lebanon, accompanied by some Syrians and Palestinians. The Christian Arabs planned to temporarily reside in the U.S., either to amass a living or escape Ottoman control, ultimately aiming to return home. They worked predominantly as mobile vendors due to the language barrier and their lack of education or training in any professional field. However, interacting with locals across different areas facilitated their familiarization with the English language and American society, leading them to settle in communities and open stores in different parts of the U.S.

A major concern to the Arabs was the integrity of their Arab identity and its endowment to the next generations, especially amidst the assimilationist requisites of American society. This tension is widely discussed in the Arabs’ newly founded newspapers. The communities remained largely dependent on each other's solidarity; interaction and marriage were generally limited to those of the same religious sect or home village.

As World War I ensued deprivation and wreckage onto the Arab region, and alongside the Johnson-Reed Quota Act of 1924, the flow of Arab immigrants arriving to the U.S. waned. The war dwindled the chances that the Christian Arabs would return home, causing them to surrender sectarian prejudice between their respective sects and begin exploring the prospects of establishing an American identity. Their professional success in the U.S. further encouraged them to stay. Thus, they invested effort to assimilate into American society and engage in American politics.

However, complications regarding American citizenship arose. The Naturalization Act of 1790 offered citizenship rights to “free white persons”. While the Arabs put forth that their Arab origin qualified them as Caucasian, several court cases emphasized their darker skin, and affinity to Islamic culture as opposed to European culture. In the end, the census legally attributed Arabs as white. However, Arabs continually experienced social exclusion, due to a commonly held belief that ‘whiteness’ was inherently synonymous to ‘Christian’ and ‘European’; a struggle that became a prominent theme in Arab American literature.

This first group established what is known as the Mahjar period of Arab-American literature.

=== Second wave (1948-1967) ===
The second wave introduced many Muslims to the Arab-American scene after the second World War, among them Palestinian refugees displaced following the Arab-Israeli War. As opposed to the Christian Arabs, this group had received education, were established in their vocations, and were knowledgeable about the patriotic ideals that had characterized the last years of Arab politics. Thus, Arab Americans of the second wave were vocal about political issues in the Arab world. Moreover, they explicitly emphasized their affiliation to Arab culture, as opposed to their Christian predecessors.

=== Third wave (1967-present day) ===
1960's America saw legal reform that substituted the quota immigration laws for more permissive immigration legislation. This change enabled many Palestinians and Lebanese Muslims to escape the Israeli war of 1967, and immigrate to the U.S.; an influx that was soon after fortified with Lebanese migrants fleeing the Lebanese Civil War of the 1970s and 1980s and Israeli seizure of the West Bank.

Out of the three migrant groups, the third had the strongest involvement in Arab politics, sharing the nationalistic and anti-colonial thought that swept the Arab region during that period.^{[2]} Joined by later generations of the earlier waves - whose sense of Arab identity became heightened due to the political atmosphere - they aimed to destabilize preconceived generalizations about Arabs and argued especially for the Palestinian cause.

== Authorial intent ==
Book cover of Crescent by Arab American author Diana Abu-Jaber

Traditionally, early immigrant Arab-American writers viewed themselves in a position of cultural interpretation, responsible for highlighting links between Arab and Western culture through their works. Similarly, early Arab-American literature reveals attempts at gaining approval from the U.S. society, either by demonstrating mastery of its accepted literary style or by actively accentuating the Christian and/or Western-like aspects of their identity. Because the perception of Arabs by non-Arab audiences is heavily colored by the notion of Orientalism, Arab-American texts are often concomitantly obliged to engage with Orientalist stereotypes as well.

Modern-day Arab-American authors focus on the monolithic grouping of ethnic-American minorities in literature. Professor Steven Salaita explained the limits placed on Arab-American literature in the publishing industry on the basis of repeating the same kinds of narratives and themes. He proposes that Arab-American authors introduce diversity and range to their works to encourage a less clichéd representation of Arab-American literature. On the other hand, Diana Abu-Jaber's novel Crescent calls for stronger communication between minority groups to uncover the simultaneous commonality and diversity of ethnic experience and overcome its homogenization into the monolithic ‘other’.

== Common themes ==
Mahjar and second wave authors of Arab-American literature predominantly wrote in form of poetry and autobiography, whereas third wave authors are increasingly introducing fiction and drama into the Arab-American literary world.

Although members of the Mahjar group consisted of early Arab immigrants, the literary canon they produced did not adhere to traditional Arab literature, whose established literary practice revolved around imitation of a set of accepted styles. The Mahjar movement incorporated aspects of Western romanticism and transcendentalism to create a new Arab American literature. Evident in early Mahjar works was an attempt to provide linking points between the East and West, among other topics such as Arab politics, criticism of American materialism and appreciation of American liveliness, a stance against sectarian hostility, and more. Most prominent was the attempt to emphasize their similarity to Western culture and understate any resemblance or association to Islam - a practice that become common in context of the court cases negotiating Arab Americans’ citizenship rights. For instance, authors stressed their Christian affiliation and their homelands’ proximity to Holy Land in their writing.

After the 1924 Johnson-Reed Quota Act, Arab America saw a sharp decrease in new immigrants. As communication with the Arab world decreased and assimilation to U.S. society continued, second generations did not identify with their Arab roots as strong as the Mahjar group had. Thus, the new generation of authors did not fully engage with their Arab identity and addressed them superficially in their works. For instance, author Vance Bourjaily discusses his ethnicity insofar as it relates to the typical American theme of identity exploration. Moreover, author William Peter Blatty's novel Which Way to Mecca, Jack? is a burlesque of his experience as a raced person which addresses his Arab heritage through self-disparaging humor.

The Civil Rights and Black Power movements of the 1960s forwarded an atmosphere of acceptance for ethnic literature. Meanwhile, the second and third wave of Muslim Arab immigrants politicized the Arab American community. The resulting literature included both works of nostalgic celebration and critical exploration of Arab American identity and culture. Examples of the former include Sam Hamod's poem “Dying with the Wrong Name” and Eugene Paul Nassar's Wind of the Land. Examples of the latter include Elmaz Abinader's Children of the Roojme: A Family's Journey from Lebanon as well as Naomi Shihab Nye's collection of poetry. Joseph Geha's Through and Through: Toledo Stories, the first Arab American work of fiction, also approached aspects of Arab American culture through an analytical perspective. Editors Gregory Orfalea and Sharif Elmusa's anthology Grape Leaves: A Century of Arab-American Poetry supports the rise of self-critique, while also representing the first comprehensive text that introduces Arab American culture to non-Arab audiences. Moreover, Arab Americans with a raised awareness about political issues following the immigration of second and third wave Arab Americans began including them in their writing.

Later Arab American authors extended the critical eye onto the Arab world itself, with writers like Etel Adnan demonstrating this new literary trend of self-critique. The anthology Food for Our Grandmothers, edited by Joanna Kadi, employs this critical method to gender dynamics in Arab American culture. Albeit not the first feminist work, it acts as a space that simultaneously gives Arab women the chance to craft their own version of female empowerment and tackles preconceived notions of gender oppression in Western audiences. It highlights the urgency of the other problems Arab women encounter besides Arab misogyny.

Contemporary literature interrogates the politics of racial categorization and minority alienation in the U.S., such as works by Lawrence Joseph, Diana Abu-Jaber, and Pauline Kaldas. A theme also present in modern-day Arab American literature is the search for a stable home and belonging amidst the multifacetedness of Arab American identity. Works by Palestinian authors like Nathalie Handal further present the theme of exile in their writing. A novel addition to Arab American literary style is spoken word poetry, as exemplified by poet Suheir Hammad.

== Literary Critique ==
There remains a lack of discourse and criticism on Arab-American literature, especially regarding works produced by the Mahjar (first wave) group and second wave of immigration. Critic Lisa Suhair Majaj finds that "'Arab-American literature' as a category was almost completely absent from listings of immigrant and ethnic-American literature” during her search for works, a concern expressed by other Arab-American authors as well. Professor and author Steven Salaita explains that Arab American fiction as a genre has not received as much criticism as poetry.

Although considerable discourse on how the Mahjar texts rejuvenated traditional Arab literature exists, deep analysis of the impact such texts had on Arab-American literature remains scarce. While third wave texts have received more extensive critique, University of Connecticut Professor Tanyss Ludescher claims that more professional criticism (such as that by Lisa Suhair Majaj, Evelyn Shakir, and Amal Amireh) is still needed.

Possessing roots in the diverse religions and societies of Arab culture, Arab-American literature's scope is obscure and nuanced. The American component further aggravates this issue: uncertainty regarding the depth to which Arab-American authors must discuss Arab values, culture, politics, and nostalgia as opposed to American immigration, society, assimilation, and multiculturalism remains. Post Gibran: Anthology of New Arab American Writing, by editors Khaled Mattawa and Munir Akash, aims to establish a specific identity for this group rather than classify as an ethnic minority, encouraging modern authors to rely less on an American-focused perspective and form ties with Arab culture, heritage, and language.

In terms of style and form, the Mahjar and second wave authors of Arab-American literature had typically focused on poetry and autobiography. The autobiographies generally narrated one of two recurrent stories: a journey of rising to success and wealth from nothing or narratives of romanticized communal upbringing. On the other hand, Majaj finds that wistful accounts of community or dramatic descriptions of war are the most fruitful application of poetry's lyric, limiting authors to these two alternatives. She argues that more works should lend insight on Arab American culture by dedicating themselves to an analysis and explanation of it.

Arab-American women authors face a distinct obstacle with feminist texts. Not only has the patriarchy of Arab society been employed to denounce and stereotype Arabs, but feminism as a Western notion is automatically linked to cultural imperialism. This implies that the feminist author endorses the overriding of Arab culture by Western thought and validates negative stereotypes. Conversely, critic Amal Amireh and author Laila Lalami explain that publishers usually encourage non-egalitarian Arab gender dynamics in Arab female narratives to comply with and capitalize on the preconceptions of a Western reader.
