= Geha =

Geha may refer to:

== People ==
- Cyril VIII Geha (1840–1916), patriarch of the Melkite Greek Catholic Church 1902–1916
- Joseph Geha (born 1944), professor emeritus and author
- Maggie Geha (born 1988), American actress and model
- Marla Geha (active since 2008), American astronomer

== Other uses ==
- Geha Interchange, the confluence of Highway 4 and Road 481 in Israel
- Geha Highway, part of Highway 4 in Israel
- GEHA (Government Employees Health Association), an American health insurance company
- GEHA Field at Arrowhead Stadium, home venue of the Kansas City Chiefs football team
