= Bride of the Sea (novel) =

2021 novel by Eman Quotah

- First edition cover
- Author: Eman Quotah
- Language: English
- Publisher: Tin House
- Publication date: January 26, 2021
- ISBN: 9781951142452

Bride of the Sea is a 2021 novel by Arab-American writer Eman Quotah.

== Plot ==
Bride of the Sea follows Muneer and Saeedah over four decades. Beginning in the 1970s, Muneer and Saeedah are newlywed Saudi Arabian immigrants who have settled in Cleveland, Ohio. During Saeedah's pregnancy, Muneer begins to doubt that they will remain married. Although they have been friends since childhood, Muneer does not believe they are suited to be married. Six years into their marriage, Muneer's doubts come to fruition, and the couple divorces. Muneer returns to Saudi Arabia while Saeedah remain in the United States with their daughter, Hanadi. Afraid her daughter may be taken from her, Saeedah disappears with her now five-year-old daughter, and Muneer spends years searching for his child. Muneer and Hanadi finally reconvene when Hanadi is 17, and Hanadi, who now goes by Hannah, attempts to reconcile what she knew about her mother and early life and what her father shares with her.

== Reception ==
In a starred review, Booklist's Shoba Viswanathan called the novel "gripping" and highlighted how it "offers thoughtful observations about religious identity, and provides vignettes of Saudi culture". Viswanathan further noted, "Geopolitics is integral to the story, serving as a backdrop for all the developments. Quotah’s deft characterization and pacing, combined with an inside look at Saudi Arabian life, make this debut a compelling and worthy read."

Michael Welch of The Chicago Review of Books wrote,

One of fiction’s greatest possibilities is how it can exist as something both intimate and grand, simultaneously exploring the life of a character and the world they are growing into, until one narrative unfolds into many. Bride of the Sea does just this, as the novel intertwines the dissolution and reconstruction of a single family with the evolving histories of the United States and Saudi Arabia. Eman Quotah deftly spans decades, miles, and cultures—and ultimately tells more stories within her 312 page debut than some authors tell across their entire careers.

The Washington Post's Keija Parssinen similarly wrote, "Where journalism constrains with word counts and column inches [...], novels offer the capaciousness to reveal a society in its complexity; to raise a headline-flattened people into three dimensions [...] Quotah does this with aplomb, offering Americans a more nuanced view of the Saudi kingdom through a cast of compelling characters and a sweeping plot that spans continents and decades."

Publishers Weekly wrote, "The narrative’s delicacy belies the weight of its themes, and descriptions are etched with precision [...] Quotah’s resonant, neatly plotted outing will be a treat for readers who love fractured family dramas."

On behalf of the Star Tribune, Eric Nguyen highlighted how the novel, which "fluidly rotates between each family member's perspective", provides "a sensitive portrayal of becoming American—both the shedding of one's culture for the sake of fitting in and the difficult task of finding one's place, especially as an Arab American". Nguyen also discussed Quotah's characters:

While Quotah should be praised for the fleshed-out development of Muneer [...] and Hanadi [...], Saeedah is the author's most interesting creation, an enigmatic character who's full of quiet and frustrating surprises. One just wishes there was more of her point of view on the page [...]. Still, in a novel as much about finding one's identity as it is about family—the way they belong to us but at the same time remain unknowable—this sense of secrecy that Quotah imparts on Saeedah makes for a devastatingly honest novel.

Although referring to the novel as "impressive", Fran Hawthorne, writing for The New York Journal of Books, critiqued the development of Saeedah's character. Hawthorne writes, "While pages and pages of often powerful writing are devoted to Hanadi’s and Muneer’s points of view, Saeedah’s voice is as stifled as if she were living in the most rigid, traditional Saudi household ... She is granted just one sentence justifying the kidnapping and no opportunity to explain some of her other wild actions [...] There is little sense of any fear, love, anxiety, annoyance, or triumph she might be feeling."

Kirkus Reviews called Bride of the Sea "a rich, finely rendered novel".

Library Journal's Faye Chadwell and the Washington Independent Review of Books's Kristin H. Macomber also reviewed the novel.

== Awards and honors ==
Booklist included Bride of the Sea on their list of the top ten debut novels of 2021.

Bride of the Sea won the 2022 Arab American Book Award.
