= George Abraham (poet) =

Palestinian American poet

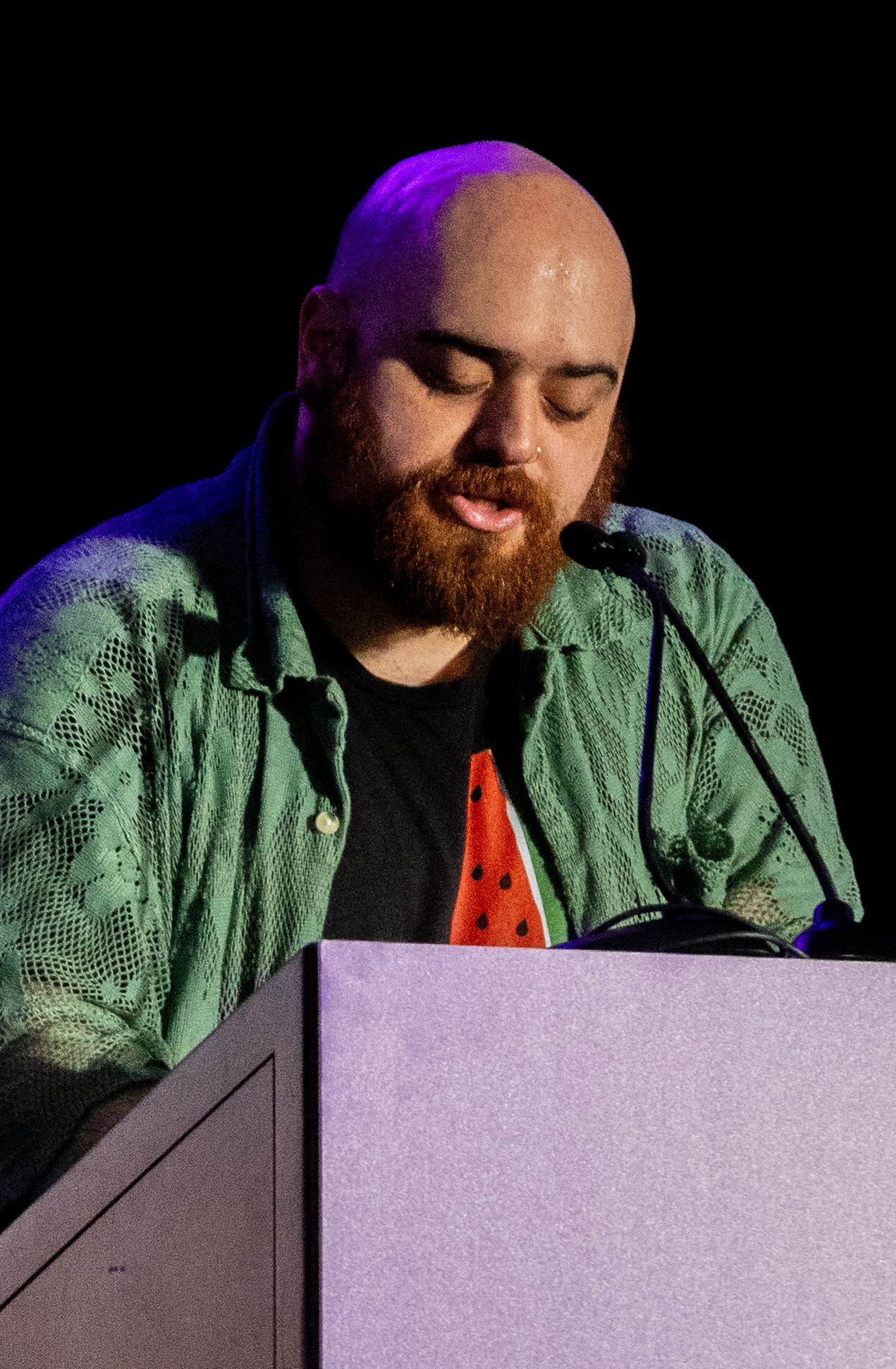
- Abraham at AWP 2025
- Born: Jacksonville, Florida, U.S.
- Education: Swarthmore College (B.A., B.S.); Harvard University (M.S.); Northwestern University (M.F.A., M.A.)
- Writing career
- Genre: Poetry
- Notable work: Birthright
- Notable awards: George Ellenbogen Poetry Award (2021); Lambda Literary Award finalist (2021)

George Abraham (جورج إبراهيم) is an American poet. Their debut collection featuring themes on their heritage as a Palestinian American, Birthright (2020), won the George Ellenbogen Poetry Award and was a finalist for the 2021 Lambda Literary Award in Bisexual Poetry. With poet Noor Hindi, Abraham co-edited Heaven Looks Like Us: Palestinian Poetry (2025), which was longlisted for the 2025 Palestine Book Awards.

Abraham has been profiled by Them and coauthored a series of essays and letters with journalist Sarah Aziza for The Nation. They are Editor at Large and Editor of Mizna Online at Mizna. Abraham is Writer-in-Residence in English at Amherst College.

== Bibliography ==
=== Poetry ===
- Birthright. Button Poetry. 2020. ISBN 9781943735679
- the specimen's apology (chapbook). Sibling Rivalry Press. 2019. ISBN 9781943977925
- al youm (chapbook). TAR. 2017.

=== Anthologies ===
- Heaven Looks Like Us: Palestinian Poetry (co-editor, with Noor Hindi). Haymarket Books. 2025. ISBN 9798888903650
