= University of Arizona Press =

Publishing arm of the University of Arizona

- Parent company: University of Arizona
- Founded: 1959
- Country of origin: United States
- Headquarters location: Tucson, Arizona
- Distribution: Chicago Distribution Center (US); UBC Press (Canada); Eurospan Group (Europe)
- Publication types: Books
- Official website: uapress.arizona.edu

The University of Arizona Press, a publishing house founded in 1959 as a department of the University of Arizona, is a nonprofit publisher of scholarly and regional books. As a means of communication between the University of Arizona and the larger world, the Press publishes the work of scholars wherever they may be, concentrating upon scholarship that reflects the special strengths of the University of Arizona, Arizona State University, and Northern Arizona University.

The Press publishes about fifty books annually and has some 1,600 books in print. These include scholarly titles in American Indian studies, anthropology, archaeology, environmental studies, geography, Chicano studies, history, Latin American studies, and the space sciences. The UA Press has award-winning books in more than 30 subject areas.

The UA Press also publishes general interest books on Arizona and the Southwest borderlands. In addition, the Press publishes books of personal essays, such as Nancy Mairs's Plaintext and two series in literature: Sun Tracks: An American Indian Literary Series and Camino del Sol: A Chicana/o Literary Series.

== Camino del Sol ==
The University of Arizona Press began their Camino del Sol Series in 1994 when it was founded by Ray Gonzalez. The series focuses on Chicanx and Latinx Literature, featuring poetry, fiction, and essays from both emerging and established Latinx writers. In 2010, Rigoberto Gonzalez edited an anthology honoring the series, also published by the University of Arizona press. Some critically acclaimed authors featured in the Camino del Sol series include: Farid Matuk, Pat Mora, Daniel A. Olivas, Sergio Troncoso, Luis Alberto Urrea, Vickie Vértiz, Tim Z. Hernandez, Juan Felipe Herrera, Emmy Pérez, Ray Gonzalez, Carmen Giménez Smith, Roberto Tejada, and more.

== Sun Tracks ==
The other major series that the UA Press published was Sun Tracks, a series featuring creative works from Native American writers. Since its launch in 1971 the series has included more than eighty volumes of poetry, prose, art, and photography by artists like Joy Harjo, N. Scott Momaday, Simon J. Ortiz, Carter Revard, and Luci Tapahonso.

== See also ==
- List of English-language book publishing companies
- List of university presses
