= Joseph Awad =

American poet

- Born: May 17, 1929; Shenandoah, Pennsylvania
- Died: July 17, 2009 (aged 80); Richmond, Virginia
- Education: Gonzaga College High School; Georgetown University
- Occupation: Public Relations
- Writing career
- Language: English
- Genre: Poetry
- Notable awards: Poet Laureate of Virginia

Joseph Frederick Awad (May 17, 1929 – July 17, 2009) was a poet, painter, public relations professional, and executive. He was appointed national president of the Public Relations Society of America in 1982 and Poet Laureate of Virginia in 1998. Awad was inducted into the Virginia Communications Hall of Fame in 1992. His poetry has been anthologized with both Arab-American and Irish-American writers (see List of Arab American writers).

== Biography ==
=== Life ===
Born in the coal-mining town of Shenandoah, Pennsylvania to Frederick Awad and Helen Dwyer. His father was a first generation Lebanese immigrant and his mother a first generation Irish immigrant. In 1939, after the death of his mother, his father moved them to Washington DC and opened a barber shop in the Mayflower Hotel. Awad obtained a scholarship to Gonzaga College High School. He then attended Georgetown University where he was editor of The Georgetown Journal and cartoonist for the student newspaper The Hoya, and graduated cum laude with a BA in English Literature in 1951. While in school he worked for the Washington Bureau of the New York Daily News, then later for Dave Herman public relations firm. He took graduate courses in literature at George Washington University and night courses in painting and drawing at the Corcoran School of Art. Awad went to work with Reynolds Metals Company in 1957, from which he retired in 1993 as executive vice president for public relations. After time spent in Louisville, Kentucky and Chicago, Illinois, he and his wife Doris settled in Richmond, Virginia in 1963. They had ten children.

Over the years, Awad held many local board memberships including, Commonwealth Catholic Charities, Friends of the Richmond Library, and The New Virginia Review. He was also chairman of the Diocesan Communications Commission and vice-president of the Virginia Writer's Club.

Joseph Awad died in Richmond, Virginia, surrounded by his family on July 17, 2009.

=== Public relations ===
Awad was appointed national president of the Public Relations Society of America in 1982 and chaired their prestigious College of Fellows. He was awarded the Thomas Jefferson Award for career achievement by the Society’s Old Dominion Chapter. The Power of Public Relations was published in 1985 by Praeger Publishers, NY. He was inducted into the Virginia Communications Hall of Fame in 1992.

=== Poetry ===
Awad published four books of poetry and his poems have been included in many anthologies and literary journals, including Commonweal, Parnassus, The Kansas Quarterly, The William and Mary Review, and The Poet's Domain. He was a member and eventual president of the Poetry Society of Virginia and awarded their Edgar Allan Poe Prize. Other prizes include The Lyric's Nathan Haskell Dole Prize and the Donn Goodwin Prize for Poetry. Awad was Poet Laureate of Virginia for the term 1998–2000.

== Bibliography ==
Poetry

- The Neon Distances, 1980
- Shenandoah Long Ago, 1990
- Leaning to Hear the Music, 1997
- The Big Bang, 1999
- Late Into the Night, 2009
- Construction Ahead, a chapbook with Irish poet Ger Killeen, 1989

Public relations

- The Power of Public Relations, 1985

Anthologies

- American Religious Poems, an anthology by Harold Bloom
- Grape Leaves: A Century of Arab-American Poetry
- The Next Parish Over: A Collection of Irish-American Writing
- Menton's Anthology of Magazine Verse and Yearbook of American Poetry
- The Zero Anthology
- The Poetry Society of Virginia Anthology
