= Noor Naga =

Canadian-Egyptian writer

- Born: Philadelphia, Pennsylvania
- Education: University of Toronto (MA)
- Occupation: Writer
- Known for: If an Egyptian Cannot Speak English

Noor Naga is a Canadian-Egyptian writer, most noted for her 2022 novel If an Egyptian Cannot Speak English.

== Life ==
Naga was born in Philadelphia and spent time living in Charleston, South Carolina, until at age seven, she and her family moved to Dubai. She received a Master of Arts in Creative Writing from the University of Toronto. Naga presently lives in Cairo, Egypt.

== Bibliography ==
- Washes, Prays (2020)
- If an Egyptian Cannot Speak English (2022)

== Awards and honours ==
Naga received the Canada Graduate Scholarship-Master's, the Mary Coyne Rowell Jackman Graduate Scholarship, and the Avie Bennett Emerging Writers Scholarship from the University of Toronto.

CBC included Naga's Washes, Prays in their "Best Canadian Poetry of 2020" list. If an Egyptian Cannot Speak English received positive media responses, as well. TIME included it on their list of "100 Must-Read Books of 2022,” and BuzzFeed listed it as one of their "Best Books of 2022." Kirkus Reviews gave it a starred review and included it on their "Best Fictional Voices of 2022" list.

Awards for Naga's writing
Year	Title	Award	Result	Ref
2015		Room's Fiction Contest	Shortlist	
2017	"The Mistress and the Ping"	RBC Bronwen Wallace Award for Emerging Writers	Winner	
2019		DISQUIET Fiction Prize	Winner	
2019	American Girl and Boy from Shobrakheit	Graywolf Press Africa Prize	Winner	
2019		RBC/PEN Canada New Voices Award	Winner	
2021	Washes, Prays	George Ellenbogen Poetry Award	Honorable mention	
2021	Washes, Prays	Pat Lowther Award	Winner	
2022	If an Egyptian Cannot Speak English	Center for Fiction First Novel Prize	Winner	
2022	If an Egyptian Cannot Speak English	Giller Prize	Shortlist	
2022	If an Egyptian Cannot Speak English	PEN/ Jean Stein Book Award	Shortlist	
