= The Angel of History =

2016 novel by Rabih Alameddine

- Author: Rabih Alameddine
- Publisher: Atlantic Monthly Press
- Publication date: October 4, 2016
- Pages: 304
- ISBN: 978-0-8021-2576-7

The Angel of History is a 2016 novel by Rabih Alameddine. It was the winner of the 2017 Arab American Book Award for Best Adult Fiction and has been widely reviewed.

== Plot ==
Throughout one night in a psych clinic waiting room, Jacob, a Yemeni poet recounts the events of his life as a gay Arab man.
