= Rise of the Arab-American Left =

2017 book by Pamela Pennock

- Author: Pamela E. Pennock
- Language: English
- Published: History
- Publisher: University of North Carolina Press
- Publication date: 2017
- Publication place: United States
- Media type: Paperback
- Pages: 316
- ISBN: 978-1-469-63098-4

The Rise of the Arab American Left: Activists, Allies, and Their Fight Against Imperialism and Racism, 1960s-1980s is a 2017 nonfiction book by Pamela E. Pennock, associate professor of history at the University of Michigan–Dearborn. It was the 2018 winner of the Evelyn Shakir Non-Fiction Award presented by the Arab American Book Award and has been widely positively reviewed.
