= Safia Elhillo =

Sudanese-American poet (born 1990)

Safia Elhillo صافية الحلو
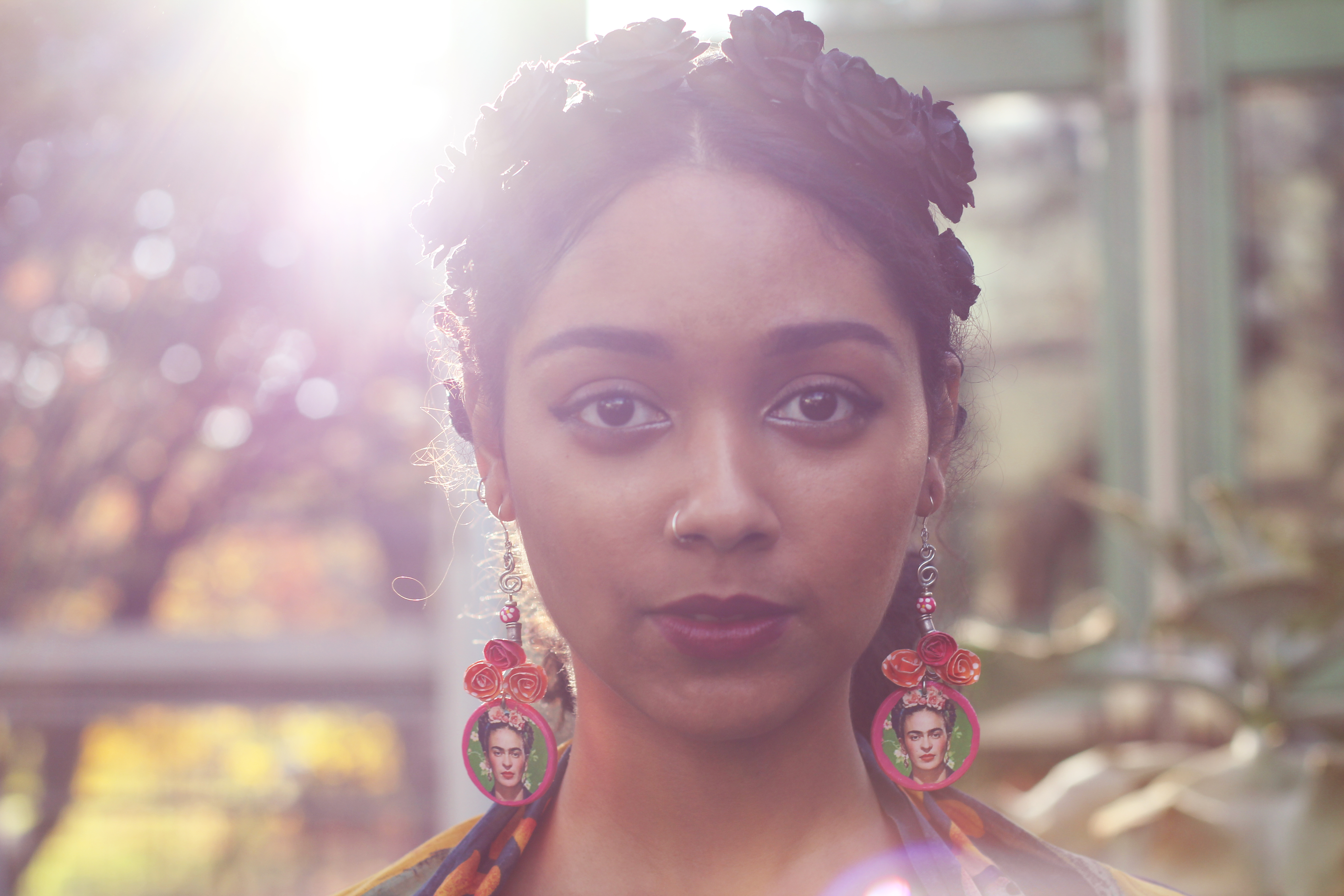
- Elhillo by Caits Meissner for Jellyfish Treasury
- Born: December 16, 1990 (age 35); Rockville, Maryland, United States
- Education: New York University (BA); The New School (MFA)
- Occupation: Poet
- Website: safia-mafia.com/tagged/main

Safia Elhillo (Arabic: صافية الحلو; born December 16, 1990) is a Sudanese-American poet known for her written and spoken poetry. Elhillo received a BA degree from the Gallatin School at New York University and an MFA in poetry from The New School. Elhillo has performed all around the world. She has won acclaim for her work and has been the recipient of several prestigious poetry awards. Elhillo has shared the stage with notable poets such as Sonia Sanchez and has taught at Split This Rock and Tin House Summer Workshop.

== Early life ==
Elhillo was born on December 16, 1990, in Rockville, Maryland, to Sudanese parents. She was raised Muslim.

== Career ==
Her poems have appeared in many publications, including Poetry, Callaloo, and the Academy of American Poets’ Poem-a-day series, among others, and in anthologies including The BreakBeat Poets: New American Poetry in the Age of Hip-Hop, Women of Resistance: Poems for a New Feminism, and New Daughters of Africa.

Elhillo has shared her work on platforms such as TEDxNewYork, Under Armour’s Unlike Any campaign, the South African State Theatre, the New Amsterdam Theatre on Broadway, and TV1's Verses & Flow and Maleficent journey.

== Awards ==
Elhillo has been nominated for the Pushcart Prize, receiving special mention for the 2016 Pushcart Prize. She was a co-winner of the 2015 Brunel University African Poetry Prize, won the 2016 Sillerman First Book Prize for African Poets, and has received fellowships and residencies from Cave Canem, The Conversation, and SPACE on Ryder Farm, among others. Her collection The January Children won a 2018 Arab American Book Award, receiving the George Ellenbogen Poetry Award, the first Sudanese American author to win the award. In 2018, she was also listed in Forbes Africa's "30 Under 30" in the Creatives category. Elhillo received a 2018 Ruth Lilly and Dorothy Sargent Rosenberg Fellowship from the Poetry Foundation.

From 2019 to 2021, she was a Wallace Stegner Fellow at Stanford University. In 2025, Elhillo's Bright Red Fruit was a Michael L. Printz Award honor book.

== Works ==
=== Full-length collections ===
- The January Children (University of Nebraska Press, 2017).
- Home Is Not A Country (Penguin Random House, 2021).
- Girls That Never Die: Poems (Penguin Random House, 2022).
- Bright Red Fruit (Penguin Random House, 2024).

=== Chapbooks ===
- ars poetica (MIEL, 2016)
- a suite for ol' dirty (MIEL, 2016)
- Asmarani (Akashic Books, 2016)
- The Life and Times of Susie Knuckles (Well & Often Press, 2012)

=== Themes ===
In The January Children, Elhillo explores themes of belonging and identity, particularly in the context of migration and nationality. In "Bright Red Fruit", Elhillo explores the complexities of identity and the longing for love using both verse and narrative.
