= Salom Rizk =

Lebanese-American author (1908–1973)

Salom Risk
- Born: 15 December 1908; Ain Arab, Mount Hermon, Ottoman Empire
- Died: 22 October 1973 (aged 64); Silver Spring, Maryland
- Citizenship: United States
- Occupations: Author, lecturer
- Writing career
- Pen name: Sam Risk, Solomon Rizk
- Language: English
- Genre: autobiography
- Subjects: immigrant life, assimilation
- Notable work: Syrian Yankee

Salom Rizk (also known as Sam Risk; born 15 December 1908 in Ain Arab, Ottoman Empire, died 22 October 1973 in Silver Spring, Maryland) was a Lebanese-American author, best known for his 1943 immigrant autobiography, Syrian Yankee, perhaps the best-known piece of Arab American literature in the middle part of the century. The book has been called "a classic of the immigrant biography genre", especially for the way Rizk's story portrays the American Dream and the virtues of cultural assimilation at the expense of his home country, which he finds loathsome when he returns for a visit. Rizk became well known enough that Reader's Digest sponsored him on a lecture tour around the United States as "the quintessential American immigrant". He also sponsored a drive for the Save the Children Federation, using advertisements in such magazines as Boys' Life to request families send their extra pencils, so that these could be donated to needy school-children around the world as a way of promoting freedom and democracy and fighting tyranny.

== Youth and journey to the USA ==
Rizk was born to Lebanese Christian parents in the village Ain Arab then under the Ottoman Empire. His mother, who had American citizenship, died when he was young, leaving him in the care of an illiterate grandmother who did not tell him of his American citizenship, which he learns of only when he is twelve; it takes him five more years before he is able to obtain his passport. At the same time, he has been told "many wonderful, unbelievable things" about the United States by his teacher, who describes it as "a country like heaven...where everything is bigger and grander and more beautiful than it has ever been anywhere else in the world...where men do the deeds of giants and think the thoughts of God". Rizk realizes, even in his imagination, that America was "everything that my present life was not", especially given the horrors that befell Syria in World War I. As soon as he was able, he left Syria for the United States. At the Port of Beirut, he boarded the S/S Sinaia, which set sail on March 30, 1927, and arrived at the Port of Providence, Rhode Island, on April 27. As the son of Charles Rizk, a naturalized United States citizen, he travelled on U.S. Passport number 323879

== Syrian Yankee ==
Rizk's description of youth is interesting for several reasons: First, it was not common at the time for Syrian immigrants to depict their journey to the United States. Second, Rizk leaves out the obvious fact that his native language is Arabic and distances himself from the Muslim aspects of Syrian culture. Third, despite being dazzled by New York City, Rizk's depiction of America "resembles nothing so much as Hell"; it is not until he returns to his homeland and sees the problems facing both the Middle East and Nazi-era Europe (including the large numbers of Jewish refugees to Palestine) that he recognizes the fulfillment of his American Dream and begins to become a vocal advocate for American values, using his own immigrant status as the grounds for his expertise. In this regard he joined the company of such immigrant writers as Mary Antin and Louis Adamic, who extol the virtues of assimilation

A revised version of the book was published in 2000 by Rizk's friend Rev. Harold Schmidt under the new title America, More than a Country.

== Literary significance ==
Rizk's contributions to American literature come both from the time in which he wrote and from the way he wrote about America. As noted above, his book captures presents the American Dream as real, as something that immigrants do in fact achieve. He thus presents what may be called an extremely optimistic view of immigration and assimilation—a view that was not shared by all immigrant authors of this period. But his work is also important for the time in which it was written. At this point in Arab-American literary culture, the New York Pen League involving Khalil Gibran, Mikhail Naimy and Elia Abu Madi (most of whom wrote in Arabic) had dissolved, and the subsequent generation of Arab American writers (mostly poets rather than novelists) was less cohesive and less interested in writing about their Arab heritage or identity. Rizk thus stands out as one of the few Arab Americans from the middle part of the century to achieve widespread attention. At the same time, the goals and achievements of the Pen League could no longer be followed, as the increase in anti-Arab racism (in the wake of the Arab-Israeli conflict then unfolding) made the writers' Arab heritage more of a burden to them, giving them a sense of a "dislocated past". Rizk thus stands as a testament to his age, to the changing tides of Arab American history and its vacillation between assimilation and diversity.
