= Eman Quotah =

Arab-American novelist

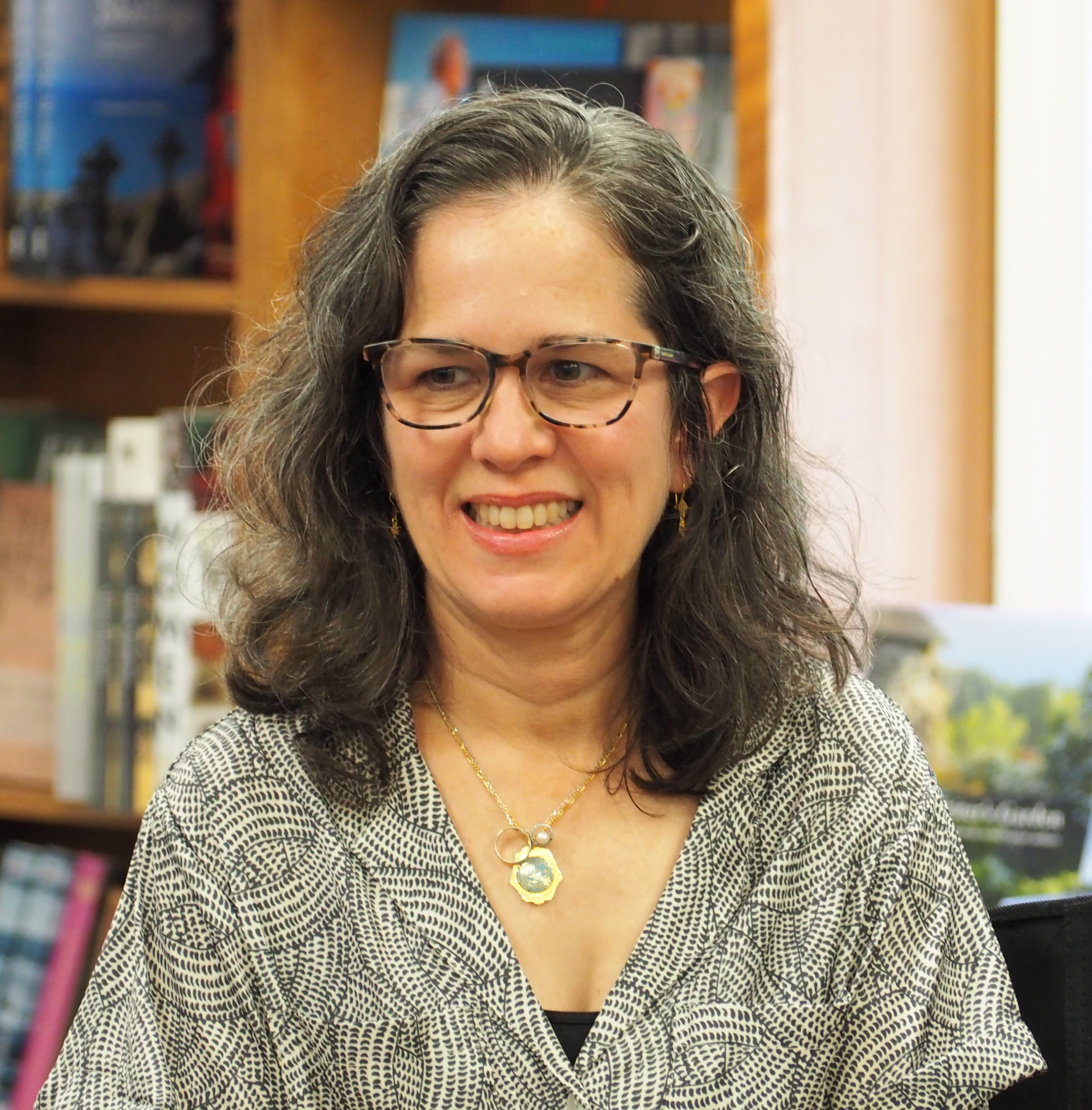
- Quotah at Politics and Prose, 2023
- Education: Swarthmore College
- Occupation: Novelist
- Writing career
- Notable work: Bride of the Sea
- Notable awards: Arab American Book Award (2022)
- Website: emanquotah.com

Eman Quotah is an Arab-American novelist. She won the 2022 Arab American Book Award.

== Early life and education ==
Quotah grew up in Jeddah and Cleveland Heights. Her father is from Saudi Arabia, and her mother is from the United States. They moved to Northeast Ohio to study at Case Western Reserve University when Quotah was a young child. While there, Quotah attended the Shaker Heights City School District. The family later moved to Jeddah, though they summered in Cleveland Heights.

Her family was Muslim, and while in Jeddah, Quotah attended a Muslim school.

Quotah graduated from Swarthmore College.

== Career ==
Quotah's short writing has appeared in Electric Literature. Guernica, and Markaz Review, among other publications. Her debut novel, Bride of the Sea, was published in 2021.

Quotah was a John McClelland Historical Writing Resident with the Espy Foundation.

== Personal life ==
Quotah lives near Washington, D.C. with her family.

She is fluent in English and Arabic.

== Works ==
- Bride of the Sea, Tin House, ISBN 9781951142452
