= Vance Bourjaily =

American journalist

- Born: September 17, 1922; Cleveland, Ohio
- Died: August 31, 2010 (aged 87); Greenbrae, California
- Education: Bowdoin College
- Occupations: Novelist; creative writing instructor; newspaper editor; essayist
- Writing career
- Genre: Fiction

Vance Nye Bourjaily (September 17, 1922 – August 31, 2010) was an American novelist, playwright, journalist, creative writing teacher, and essayist.

== Life ==
Bourjaily was born in Cleveland, Ohio to Monte Ferris Bourjaily, a Lebanese immigrant who was a journalist and later became editor of the United Features Syndicate, and Barbara Webb, an American-born features author and novelist. Bourjaily moved several times during his youth. His childhood was spent in Connecticut, Virginia, and New York. Bourjaily graduated from Handley High School in Winchester, Virginia in 1939. After graduating, Bourjaily enrolled in Bowdoin College. With the coming of World War II, Bourjaily became a volunteer ambulance driver from 1942 to 1944. He then served two years in the army from 1944 to 1946. Bourjaily's time in the army was a central theme to many of his later writings. His Arab American themes are explored by literary critic Evelyn Shakir

Bourjaily graduated from Bowdoin College with a B.A. in 1947. While at Bowdoin, he became a brother of the Delta Kappa Epsilon fraternity (Theta chapter). After graduating, he lived for a few years in San Francisco, writing feature stories for the San Francisco Chronicle before moving to New York City in 1950.

Bourjaily married Bettina Yensen in 1946. The couple had three children: Anna, Robin, and Philip. His daughter Anna, along with the daughter's fifth-grade classmate, were killed in a 1964 car accident, in which Bourjaily was driving. Yensen and Bourjaily later divorced.

Bourjaily remarried in 1985, to Yasmin Mogul (a former student) and had a son, Omar, by her. According to his wife, Bourjaily died in Greenbrae, California on August 31, 2010 after slipping into a coma just a few days after suffering from a fall.

Bourjaily's son Phil is a columnist for Field & Stream magazine.

Raymond Carver named his only son, Vance, after Bourjaily. Carver was a student at the Iowa Writer's Workshop where he became friends with Bourjaily.

== Career ==
Bourjaily's first novel, entitled The End of My Life, was heavily influenced by Bourjaily's wartime experiences. Critics said that the novel borrowed heavily from the style and tone of Ernest Hemingway. However, the novel was met with praise and was hailed by critic John W. Aldridge as a war novel on the level of Hemingway's Farewell to Arms. Bourjaily's second novel, The Hound of Earth, paints a picture of Cold War America through the eyes of a scientist who helped develop the atomic bomb. His third novel, The Violated, dealt with the themes of violence and alienation. This book was also met with critical praise.

Bourjaily spent much of his career in academia. From 1957 to 1980, he worked as a creative writing instructor and a professor at the Iowa Writer's Workshop. Bourjaily also worked at several other academic institutions such as Oregon State University, the University of Arizona, and Louisiana State University. At the latter institution, he was the first director of the MFA Program in Creative Writing. In 1978, Bourjaily served as a judge on for the National Book Award's committee to choose the award for fiction.

== Bibliography ==
- Contemporary Authors Online, Gale, 2009. Reproduced in Biography Resource Center. Farmington Hills, Mich.: Gale, 2009.

== Selected works ==
- The End of My Life (1947)
- The Girl in the Abstract Bed (1954)
- The Hound of Earth (1955)
- The Violated (1958)
- Confessions of a Spent Youth (1960)
- The Unnatural Enemy: Essays on Hunting (1963)
- The Man Who Knew Kennedy (1967)
- Brill Among the Ruins (1970)
- Country Matters: Collected Reports from the Fields and Streams of Iowa and Other Places (essays) (1973)
- Now Playing at Canterbury (1976)
- A Game Men Play (1980)
- The Great Fake Book (1986)
- Old Soldier: A Novel (1990)
