= Eugene Paul Nassar =

Writer and editor (1935–2017)

Gene Nassar
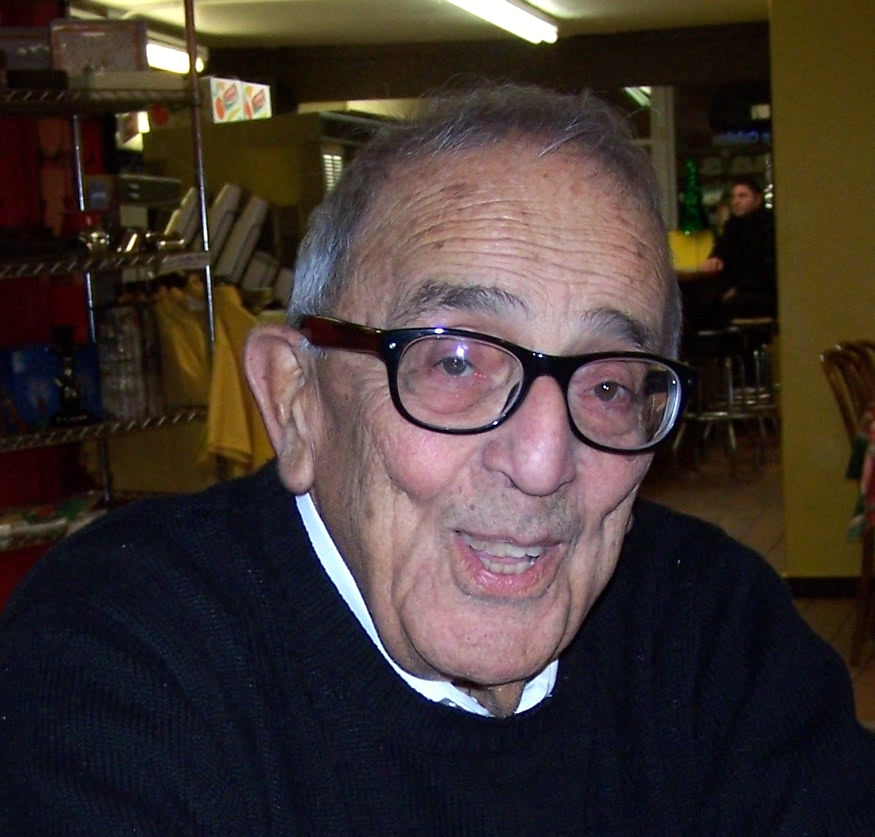
- Gene Nassar in 2004
- Born: Eugene Paul Nassar; June 20, 1935; East Utica, New York
- Died: April 7, 2017 (aged 81)
- Education: Kenyon College, University of Oxford, Cornell University
- Occupations: Writer, editor, literary critic, professor
- Employer: Utica College
- Known for: Founder of the Ethnic Heritage Studies Center at Utica College
- Notable work: Wind of the Land
- Awards: Rhodes Scholarship, Fellowship from the National Endowment for the Humanities

Eugene "Gene" Paul Nassar (20 June 1935 – 7 April 2017), was a writer, editor, professor, and literary critic. He was a professor emeritus of English at Utica College, Utica, New York. In 1981, he founded the Eugene Paul Nassar Ethnic Heritage Studies Center at Utica University.

== Early life ==
Eugene Paul Nassar was born on 20 June 1935 in East Utica, New York, the son of Mintaha (née Kassouf) and Michael Nassar. He wrote a memoir, Wind of the Land, of growing up in a Lebanese Christian family in East Utica, an Italian-American neighborhood. He lived in his childhood home for more than 65 years.

He graduated from Kenyon College in 1957. After graduating from Kenyon College, for one week, he attended Yale Medical School, before quitting to pursue literature. He returned to Kenyon College, where was awarded a Rhodes Scholarship. He was a Rhodes Scholar at Worcester College and Oxford University, and earned a master's degree from the latter. In 1962, he received a Ph.D. from Cornell University in English and American Literature. He held a Fellowship from the National Endowment for the Humanities.

== Career ==
He taught briefly at Hamilton College, and in 1964, began teaching at Utica College. Nassar served as the director of the Ethnic Heritage Studies Center at Utica College (later renamed the Eugene Paul Nassar Ethnic Heritage Studies Center), which he founded in 1981.

He wrote several books of literary criticism in the close analysis tradition of his teachers, John Crowe Ransom at Kenyon College, Christopher Ricks at University of Oxford, Arthur Mizener of Cornell University, and his critical model and mentor, Cleanth Brooks. He wrote long studies of the figural images in the poetry of Wallace Stevens, the lyric passages in Ezra Pound's The Cantos, and Hart Crane’s The Bridge, along with numerous essays in criticism of poems, drama and fiction. He also edited an anthology of illustrations to Dante’s Inferno, various essays in sociological criticism, essays and reviews in many journals, and several books.

He died on April 7, 2017, at the age of 81.

He has correspondence from 1966 to 1994 held in the Special Collections at the Jean and Alexander Heard Library at Vanderbilt University. The correspondence covers his letters with Cleanth Brooks and John Crowe Ransom. His papers, which include notices and reviews of his work, are housed in Utica College's archives.

== Books ==
Author

- Wallace Stevens: An Anatomy of Figuration. Univ. of Pennsylvania Press, (1965). 2nd printing in 1968.
- The Rape of Cinderella: Essays in Literary Continuity. Indiana Univ. Press, (1970)
- Selections from a Prose Poem: East Utica. Munson-Williams-Proctor Arts Institute. Limited edition, published at The Widtman Press, Utica, NY. With woodcuts by Robert Cimbalo. (1971)
- The Cantos of Ezra Pound: The Lyric Mode. Johns Hopkins Univ. Press, (1975). 2nd printing, 1976.
- Wind of the Land: Two Prose Poems. A.A.U.G. (1979)
- Essays: Critical and Metacritical. Fairleigh Dickinson Univ. Press, (1983)
- Illustrations to Dante's Inferno. Fairleigh Dickinson Univ. Press, (1994)
- A Walk Around the Block: Literary Texts and Social Contexts. Ethnic Heritage Studies Center. (1999)
- Local Sketches. Ethnic Heritage Studies Center. (2003)
- My World, My Time: More Local Sketches. Ethnic Heritage Studies Center. (2012)

Editor

- Grace Ione Spencer: Portrait of an Uncommon Woman. with Harry Jackson. Utica College, 1977.
- The Family Structure in Islam. Hamudah Abdalati. The American Trust, 1977.
- Vignettes of Old Utica. Judge John Walsh. Utica Public Library, 1982.
- Annotated Index to the Syrian World, 1926-32. with John Moses. I.H.R.C., Univ. of Minnesota, 1994.
- Ethnic Utica. with James Pula. Ethnic Heritage Studies Center, Utica College, 1994, 2nd ed. 2001.
- History of Utica College: The First Twenty-Five Years. Harry Jackson. Utica College Archives.
- Welsh Imprints of Central New York. Ethnic Heritage Studies Center, Utica College 1996, 2nd ed. 1998.
- Mount Allegro. Jerre Mangione. Syracuse University Press 1998.
- Fiorentino. Ethnic Heritage Studies Center, 2003.
- Rufie: A Political Scrapbook. Ethnic Heritage Studies Center, 2009
- The Graphic Art of Robert Cimbalo. Ethnic Heritage Studies Center, 2010

== Articles ==
Articles appeared in: College English, Renascence (2), Paideuma, Mosaic, American Oxonian, Melus, Syracuse Scholar (2), New York Folklore, Bulletin of Research in the Humanities, Dictionary of American Immigration History, Virginia Quarterly Review, Dante Studies(3).Dante Encyclopedia, Ambassador. Mohawk Valley History (7), Utica Observer-Dispatch (42).

Reviews appeared in: Essays in Criticism (2), Wallace Stevens Journal, Modern Age (5), Sewanee Review, Italian America.

== See also ==
- Peter Quince at the Clavier
