= Elsa Marston =

American author (1933–2017)

- Born: March 18, 1933
- Died: February 16, 2017 (aged 83)
- Education: University of Iowa (BA); Harvard University (MA)
- Occupation: Author
- Writing career
- Genre: Children's literature

Elsa Harik (née Marston), (March 18, 1933 – February 16, 2017) known professionally as Elsa Marston, is an American author of children's books about the Middle East and North Africa. She died after completing her last book, "I Just Kept Walking." She graduated from the University of Iowa (BA) and Harvard University (MA).
