= Hedy Habra =

Lebanese-American poet, professor, fiction writer, literary critic and essayist

- هيدي هبرا
- Born: Heliopolis, Egypt
- Occupations: Poet, professor, writer, literary critic
- Writing career
- Genres: poetry, fiction, literary criticism
- Notable works: Mundos alternos y artísticos en Vargas Llosa (2012), Flying Carpets (2013), Tea in Heliopolis (2013), "Under Brushstrokes" (2015) "The Taste of the Earth" (2019)
- Website: hedyhabra.com

Hedy Habra is a Lebanese-American poet, professor, fiction writer, literary critic and essayist. Born in Heliopolis, Egypt, she lived in both Egypt and Lebanon, as well as Athens, Greece, and Brussels, Belgium, before settling in Kalamazoo, Michigan, where she now resides.

Prior to moving to the United States, Habra completed a B.S. in Pharmacy at the Faculté Française de Médecine et de Pharmacie of Beirut, S.J. She holds an M.A. and an M.F.A. in English and an M.A. and PhD in Spanish Literature, which were all granted by Western Michigan University, where she currently teaches.

Habra is an avid student of languages, and is fluent in French, Arabic, English, Spanish and Italian. She studied Greek and Latin at WMU and Mandarin Chinese at the WMU Confucius Institute, along with Chinese Ink Painting and Tai Chi.

== Recognition ==
=== Awards ===
==== The Taste of the Earth ====
- 2019 USA Best Books Awards Finalist.

==== Under Brushstrokes ====
- Finalist, 2016 International Books Awards, Poetry Category
- Finalist, 2016 USA Best Book Award, Poetry Category
- Nomination, 2016 Pushcart Prize, "How Much of Yourself Remains Within the Walls of a Home", "A Bird's Song, Unraveled", "Visiting my Mother in Montreal"

==== Tea in Heliopolis ====
- Winner, 2014 USA Best Book Award, Poetry Category
- Finalist, 2014 International Poetry Book Award

==== Flying Carpets ====
- Winner, Honorable Mention, 2013 Arab American Book Award in Fiction
- Finalist, 2014 Eric Hoffer Book Award in Short Fiction
- Finalist for the 2014 USA Best Book Award in Short Fiction

==== Academic awards ====
- Excellence in Teaching Award Western Michigan University (2015–2016)
- Excellence in Teaching Award Western Michigan University (2014)
- Alumni Achievements Award Western Michigan University (2013)

==== Poetry ====
- Tiferet Journal Poetry Contest Honorable Mention (2014): "I'd Like to Sing a Song of Freedom"
- Pirene's Fountain Poetry Awards (2014): Monostich Poetry Contest Winner "Canvas", Four Lines Poetry Contest Winner "Resonance"
- Nazim Hikmet Fourth Annual International Poetry Competition Winner (2012):"I Always Knew I was a Sybil at Heart," "Weaving and Unweaving", "Writing in Dust"
- New Millennium Award Semi-finalists (2011–2012):"Shipwrecked," "Obsessive Compulsion"
- Letras Femeninas Premio Victoria Urbano Winner (2007):"Mascarade," "Bricolage," "Simulacra," "Unborn," "Evening Walk"
- Explicación de Textos Literarios Premio Spanish Press Winner (2005):"Bajo pinceladas," "El sol también tiene su lado oscuro," "Contrapunto"
- Nimrod/Hardman Award, Pablo Neruda Prize Finalists (2003):"Tea at Chez Paul's," "Untold Tale(s) of Unfinished Tapestry," "Narguileh,""I had Never Seen a Dead Man Before," "Open-Air Cinema in Heliopolis,""A Triptych, Unraveled"
- Pirate's Alley Faulkner Prize Finalist (1999): "Raoucheh"
- Linden Lane Magazine's English Poetry Prize Winner (1994):"Encounters," "Vanishing Shadow," "I Haven't Written a Poem in a Long Time"
- Negative Capability's Eve of St. Agnes Award Finalist (1994): "A Glimpse of Fall"
- Negative Capability's Eve of St. Agnes Award Finalist (1993): "To Henriette"
- Negative Capability's Eve of St. Agnes Award Finalist (1992): "That Day in Heliopolis"
- Robert Whiting Awards Finalists (1990): "Transience," "Raindrops" "The Communion"
- Negative Capability's Eve of St. Agnes Award Finalists (1989): "Tea at Heliopolis," "The White Brass Bed," "Camera Lucida"
- Linden Lane Magazine's English Poetry Prize, Third place (1989): "Waiting for Marie"
- Linden Lane Magazine's English Poetry Prize Finalist (1987): "Immured," "Dive."
- Journal Français d'Amérique Concours de Poèmes de Noël, Second place (1986): "Al Milad"

==== Fiction ====
- Letras Femeninas Premio Victoria Urbano Winner (2007): "Noor el Kamar"
- New Voices Contest Honorable Mention (1993): "Mariam"
- New Voices Contest Honorable Mention (1992): "Anemones Fingers"

==== Grants ====
- All-University Research & Creative Scholar Fellowship Award Western Michigan University (2006).
- Doctoral Dissertation Completion Fellowship Award Western Michigan University (2006).
- Graduate Research Scholar & Creative Writing Award WMU Spanish Department (2006).
- Graduate Research Scholar & Creative Writing Award WMU Languages & Linguistics Department (1993).

== Bibliography ==
=== Essays ===
- "Ecos y resonancias de Borges en Barthes." Hispanic Journal (Forthcoming 2020).
- "Modalidades de la imaginación erótica: De Conversación en La Catedral a Los cuadernos de don Rigoberto" Editor Roy Boland, Australia (2016)
- "Recreación y reflexividad en dos diaristas vargasllosisanos: Don Rigoberto y Gauguin." "La ciudad y los perros y el Boom hispanoamericano." Actas del Congreso Homenaje a Vargas Llosa. Selected Proceedings: Casa de la Literatura Peruana. Lima, Perú (2016).
- "Evolución de la mirada masculina en Travesuras de la niña mala de Mario Vargas Llosa: del arte visual a la literatura" 32, vol 60–61 Alba de América (2012).
- "Los submundos pictóricos de un diarista: Gauguin en El Paraíso en la otra esquina," Latin American Literary Review (2011).
- "Flora Tristán: de aventurera a visionaria en El Paraíso en la otra esquina," Alba de América (2010).
- "Rubén Darío, 'monje artífice' de 'El reino interior,'" Explicación de Textos Literarios 33.2 (2005).
- "Fragmentación proteica y especular en la Reivindicación del Conde don Julián de Juan Goytisolo." INTI 61–62 (2005).
- "Escisión y liberación en 'La casa de azúcar' de Silvina Ocampo." Hispanófila 145 (2005).
- "Angel Rama: legados y aportes a la crítica literaria hispanoamericana." Hispanic Journal 25 (2005).
- "Re-escritura y subversión de la iconografía dariana de "El Reino Interior" en "Tú me quieres blanca" de Alfonsina Storni." Alba de América 24 (2005).
- "Transferencia de la imagen paterna en Arráncame la vida: del juego infantil al juego erótico y agónico." La Mujer en la Literatura del Mundo Hispano. Colección La Mujer... ICLH 6 (2005).
- "Modalidades especulares de desdoblamiento en Aura de Carlos Fuentes." Confluencia 21 (2005).
- "Deconstrucción del tejido mítico franquista" Espéculo: Revista de estudios literarios (UCM) 28 (2004).
- "Recuperación de la imagen materna a la luz de elementos fantásticos en Pedro Páramo." Chasqui 33 (2004).
- "El palmar de la Chusmita: pre-texto y resistencia a la escritura en Doña Bárbara." Hispanic Journal 24 (2004).
- "Lituma's Fragmented Image in Mario Vargas Llosa's Fiction" Latin American Literary Review 30 (2004).
- "El arte como espejo: función y trascendencia de la creación artística en Los cuadernos de don Rigoberto." Confluencia 18 (2003).
- "El detective entre el inconsciente personal y el inconsciente colectivo en Lituma en los Andes." Alba de América 20 (2002).
- "Postmodernidad y reflexividad artística en Los cuadernos de don Rigoberto." Chasqui 30 (2001).
- "Acercamiento lúdico a lo fantástico en la narrativa breve de Arenas, Cortázar y García Márquez." Hispanic Journal 21 (2001).
- "El espíritu del juego en El Buscón." Explicación de Textos Literarios 27 (1998–1999).
- "El negrero como personaje romántico en Pedro Blanco, el negrero de Lino Novás Calvo." Afro-Hispanic Review 18 (1999).
- "Multiplicidad de juegos en El apuntador de Carlos Maggi." Hispanófila 125 (1999).
- "Revelación anamórfica en Elogio de la madrastra." LA CHISPA '97 Selected Proceedings (1997).
- "Reminiscencias órficas en ¿Quién mató a Palomino Molero?" Revista de Estudios Hispánicos 31 (1997).
- "La Sonata de otoño de Valle-Inclán: espejo narcisista de un don Juan decadente." Crítica Hispánica 18 (1996).
- "Caupolicán o la creación de un mito: La Araucana de Alonso de Ercilla." MIFLIC Review: Selected Proceedings 5 (1995).
- "Erotismo in Raining Backwards" de Roberto Fernández. Linden Lane Magazine 11 (1992).
- "Chiaroscuro in Joyce's ‘Araby’" Cermeil 11 (1986).

=== Poetry ===
==== Books of poems ====
- The Taste of the Earth, (Press 53 2019)
- Tea in Heliopolis, (Press 53, Winston-Salem, NC, 2013. ISBN 9781935708766)
- Under Brushstrokes, (Press 53, Winston-Salem, NC, 2015. ISBN 9781941209233)

==== Published poems in print and online anthologies ====
- Ars Moriendi Writings on the Art of Dying, Desmond Kong zhicheng-mingdé, Ed. "Obsessive compulsion," "The Memory of Unspoken Words," "Face à face," "The Ages of Man," "After the Storm," "To My Grandmother, Heliopolis, Egypt 1965," "Everything They Said" (2015) ISBN 9789810958084
- BARED: Les Femmes Folles Anthology on Bras and Breasts, Laura Madeline Wiseman, Ed. "First Bra" (forthcoming 2016)
- Come Together: Imagine Peace, Harmony Series, Bottom Dog Press. Philip Metres, Ann Smith and Larry Smith Eds. Blue Heron" (2008). ISBN 9781933964225
- Conservation International Poetry Project: Melancholy and Memory
- Söylesí Üç Aylik Suur Dergisi trans. into Turkish (2010).
- FIRST WATER, The Best of Pirene's Fountain Anthology "Liberation Square," "Broken Ladder" (2013).
- FULCRUM: An Anthology of Poetry and Aesthetics: "Silence" (2015)
- Inclined to Speak: An Anthology of Contemporary Arab American Poetry Hayan Charara, Ed. "Even the Sun has its Dark Side," "Milkweed," "Tea at Chez Paul's" (2008). ISBN 9781557288677*Mediterranean.nu (3 contributions) http://www.odyssey.pm/?p=1786
- Nazim Hikmet Fourth Annual Nazim Hikmet Poetry Festival Poetry: A Chapbook of Talks and Poetry Award-Winning Poems "I Always Knew I was a Sybil at Heart," "Weaving and Unweaving" "Writing in Dust" (2012).
- The Original Van Gogh's Ear Anthology "ATryptich: Visibile parlare in sotto voce" (2012).
- Poetic Voices Without Borders Vol 2 Gival Press, Robert Giron, Ed,:

"El sol también tiene su lado oscuro," "Contrapunto," "Adagio por una viola d’amore olvidada," "Mapas," "Aquarelle," "Chute Libre," "Le café Turc," "Délire," "Filles du feu," "Niagara,"La vieille femme" (2009).

- RAWI.org Featured Writer for the month May 2010
- "Raoucheh," "Narguileh," "Open-Air Cinema in Heliopolis," "Salawat,"
- "Tea at Chez Paul's," "Lost and Found."
- Shake the Tree Anthology Vol 2, Kelle Grace Gaddis, Ed. (2016) Ten poems by Hedy Habra.
- SilverBirch Press: Where I live Poetry Series Anthology "Blue Heron" (2015).
- SilverBirch Press: I am Waiting Poetry Series Anthology "Waiting in a Field of Melted Honey" (2014).
- Sunrise from Blue Thunder Japan Anthology "Aftershocks in Fukushima," Hokusai's The Great Wave" (2011).
- Women's Voices for Change Rebecca Foust, Ed. "Tea at Chez Paul's" (2015).

=== Short stories ===
- "Flying Carpets", (Interlink Books, Northampton, MA, 2013. ISBN 9781566569576)

=== Literary criticism ===
- "Mundos alternos y artísticos en Vargas Llosa", (Iberoamericana, Madrid, 2012. ISBN 9788484896890)
