= Old Islam in Detroit =

Book by Sally Howell

Old Islam in Detroit: Rediscovering the Muslim American Past
- First edition
- Author: Sally Howell
- Language: English
- Subject: Islam, Detroit
- Publisher: Oxford University Press
- ISBN: 978-0-19-937200-3 (Hardcover)

Old Islam in Detroit: Rediscovering the Muslim American Past is a 2014 book by Sally Howell, published by the Oxford University Press. It discusses the Muslims of early 20th century Detroit, Michigan, and Detroit prior to 1970.

== Contents ==
External videos
- Interview with Sally Howell on the topic of Muslims in Detroit, January 5, 2018, C-SPAN

The first parts of the book discusses the first Muslims to settle Detroit and the city's the first Islamic religious facility, the Highland Park Mosque. Another chapter discusses the second mosque, Universal Islamic Society (UIS). The later chapters discuss Islamic leaders who originated from Detroit and the first mosques to open in Dearborn. At the end of the book Howell states that pre-1980s views of Muslims influences views of Islam held by Americans in the post-September 11 environment.

The book includes interviews of the original Muslims and their families.

== Reception ==
Dawn-Marie Gibson of Royal Holloway, University of London stated that the book was "thoroughly researched" and is "a valuable contribution to scholarship on American Islam."

B. D. Singleton rated the book two stars, and stated that the book "is appropriate for all academic libraries" and is "nicely illustrated but would have been strengthened by a basic chronology."

== See also ==
- Islam in Metro Detroit
