= Birthright (Abraham book) =

2020 poetry book

- Author: George Abraham
- Genre: Poetry
- Publisher: Button Poetry
- Publication date: April 7, 2020
- Pages: 127
- ISBN: 9781943735679

Birthright is a 2020 poetry book written by Palestinian-American poet George Abraham and published by Button Poetry. It was the winner of the 2021 Arab American Book Award in Poetry and has been widely reviewed

== Awards ==
- 2021 Arab American Book Award - Winner (poetry)
- 2021 Lambda Literary Awards - Finalist (bisexual poetry)
- 2020 Big Other Awards - Winner (poetry)
- 2020 Big Other Awards - Finalist (Reader's Choice)
