= Thérèse Soukar Chehade =

American novelist

- Born: Beirut, Lebanon
- Education: University of Massachusetts Amherst (MFA)
- Occupations: Author, teacher
- Children: 2
- Writing career
- Language: English
- Genre: Novels
- Subjects: War, Refugees, Immigrants
- Notable work: Loom: A Novel
- Notable awards: Arab American Book Award for Fiction (2011)

Thérèse Soukar Chehade is an American author. Her first book, Loom: a Novel, published in 2010 by Syracuse University Press, won the 2011 Arab American Book Award. Soukar Chehade lives in western Massachusetts, where she writes and teaches English.

== Early life and education ==
Thérèse Soukar Chehade was born and raised in Beirut, Lebanon. When she was 12 years old, the civil war broke out, and "for the next eight years she toggled between living the life of an ordinary teenager and hiding from bullets and bombs." In 1983, she moved from Lebanon to Massachusetts. There she enrolled at the University of Massachusetts Amherst, where she obtained a Master of Fine Arts in English writing, studying with John Edgar Wideman, as well as a master's degree in English language education.

== Writing influences ==
Soukar Chehade's writing centers around the civilian experience of living in a war zone, fleeing from war, and having to start a new life from scratch in a new place. She credits Virginia Woolf's "To the Lighthouse" with inspiring her to write in her non-native English.

== Loom: A Novel ==
=== Synopsis ===
Chehade's first novel, "Loom," portrays a Lebanese-American family, the Zaydans, struggling to reconcile generational differences and immigrant identity. On the evening of the arrival of a cousin, Eva, from Lebanon, the Zaydans are sequestered by a blizzard. Amidst the storm, the family matriarch, Emilie, struggles with English and prefers not to speak. Her eldest daughter, Josephine, still lives at home with her brother George's family and remembers the independence she had in Lebanon. George's daughter, Marie, longs to leave behind her conservative family and head off to Berkeley. With Eva stranded in the storm in New York, and tensions rising, Emilie braves the blizzard to deliver a meal to the mysterious neighbor the Zaydans have nicknamed "Loom," and the family is forced to leave the metaphorical and actual isolation of their home as they go after her.

=== Influences ===
In the novel, Chehade draws heavily from her experiences growing up during the Lebanese Civil War as well as from her life as a young immigrant in New England. Her memories of the war helped to inform the character development of Eva and Salma.

=== Reception ===
On release, Loom was recommended by Library Journal magazine, as part of its "Fall Firsts" purchase list. In Foreword Reviews, Jessica Henkle described the book as an entire story formed within a pause where what ensues over twenty-four hours is spellbinding, revealing a history of secrets and resentments, of undisclosed pain and unshakable love. Theri Alyce Pickens thought the book was a hauntingly beautiful read, where as the snow falls, the novel’s pace slows considerably to give room to the characters’ musings, but where this slowness is compensated for by Chehade’s outstanding skill in developing their memories, painting each with depth and sadness without making them tragic or depressing.

== Awards ==
- 2011 Arab American Book Award for Loom: a Novel
- 2025 Arab American Book Award for We Walked On

== Bibliography ==
=== Fiction ===
- We Walked On, Regal House Publishing, Raleigh, NC, 2024. (ISBN 1646035208)
- Loom: A Novel, Syracuse University Press, Syracuse, NY, 2010. (ISBN 9780815609827)
- Red Pistachios, Big Big Wednesday, Issue 5, 2017.
- Madame Latte, Taos Journal of International Poetry and Art, 2017.

=== Newspaper columns ===
- An immigrant reflects after the election, Daily Hampshire Gazette, November 22, 2016.
- Return to an obtuse and dangerous innocence, Daily Hampshire Gazette, January 5, 2017.
- Borders are complicated spaces, Daily Hampshire Gazette, February 5, 2017.
- Drive for independence pulses like a heartbeat, Daily Hampshire Gazette, July 3, 2018.
