= Gregory Orfalea =

American poet

- Born: Gregory Orfalea; August 9, 1949 (age 77); Los Angeles, California, United States
- Occupations: Poet, writer
- Writing career
- Genres: Poetry, short story, biography
- Notable works: "Journey to the Sun: Junipero Serra's Dream and the Founding of California"

Gregory Orfalea is an American writer, the author or editor of nine books, including his most recent works, the biography Journey to the Sun: Junipero Serra's Dream and the Founding of California (Scribner, 2014) and a short story collection, The Man Who Guarded the Bomb (Syracuse UP, 2010).

== Background ==
Orfalea was born and raised in Los Angeles, California. His grandparents immigrated to the United States from Syria and Lebanon between 1890 and 1920; his ancestral towns include Homs and Arbin, Syria; and Mheiti, Lebanon. He is the cousin of Paul Orfalea, founder of Kinko’s.

== Career ==
Orfalea has taught graduate and undergraduate school at the Claremont Colleges, Georgetown University, and Westmont College. He teaches creative nonfiction, the short story, the literature of California, and Middle Eastern émigré literature.

== Critical review ==
Kirkus Review said of Journey to the Sun: "A California story has become an American story." The San Francisco Chronicle said, "Orfalea writes from his own spiritual heart and soars into the realm of poetry... His drama never lags." Dr. Allan Figueroa Deck, Cassasa Chair and Professor of Theological Studies at Loyola Marymount University noted, "Serra comes alive in this volume as in no other." About the memoir of Orfalea's youth in Los Angeles, Richard Rodriguez said, "These essays, recollecting Gregory Orfalea's American life, are delightful and wise."

Angeleno Days won the Arab American Book Award and was a finalist for the PEN Center USA Prize.

== Works ==
=== Non-fiction ===
- Journey to the Sun: Junipero Serra's Dream and the Founding of California (2014)
- The Man Who Guarded the Bomb (2010)
- Messengers of the Lost Battalion: The Heroic 551st and the Turning of Tide at the Battle of the Bulge (2010)
- Angeleno Days: An Arab American Writer on Family, Place, and Politics (2009)
- The Arab Americans: A History (2005)
- Up All Night: Practical Wisdom for Mothers and Fathers (2004), co-edited with Barbara Rosewicz
- Grape Leaves: A Century of Arab-American Poetry (1999), co-edited with Sharif Elmusa
