= Susan Muaddi Darraj =

American writer

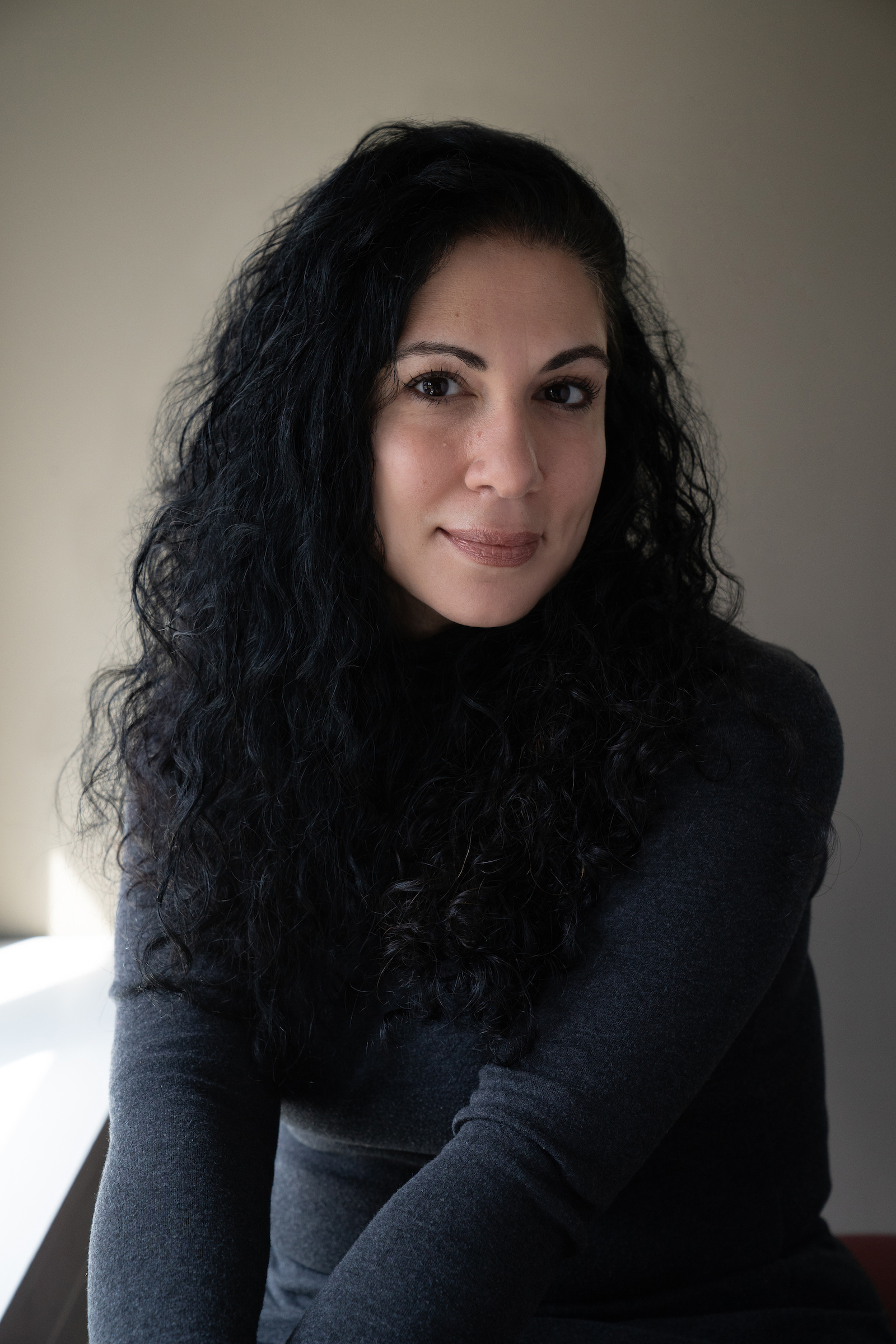
Susan Muaddi Darraj, 2019

Susan Muaddi Darraj (born May 11, 1975) is a Palestinian American writer. Born in Philadelphia to Palestinian immigrant parents, she attended Rutgers University - Camden, NJ, where she earned a master's degree in English Literature. She has authored several collections of fiction, young adult and children's books, as well as academic and personal essays and articles. Muaddi Darraj is a tenured professor of English Literature at Harford Community College as well as a Senior Lecturer in Creative Writing at The Johns Hopkins University. She lives in Baltimore, MD.

== Books ==
=== The Inheritance of Exile ===
Muaddi Darraj's first work of fiction, The Inheritance of Exile, was published by the University of Notre Dame Press in 2008. It has been compared to Amy Tan's The Joy Luck Club because of its structure: it offers several, intertwined stories narrated by Palestinian American women, as well as stories narrated by their immigrant mothers. The book is set in the working-class neighborhood of South Philadelphia, and its characters grapple with the intersectional identities.

=== A Curious Land ===
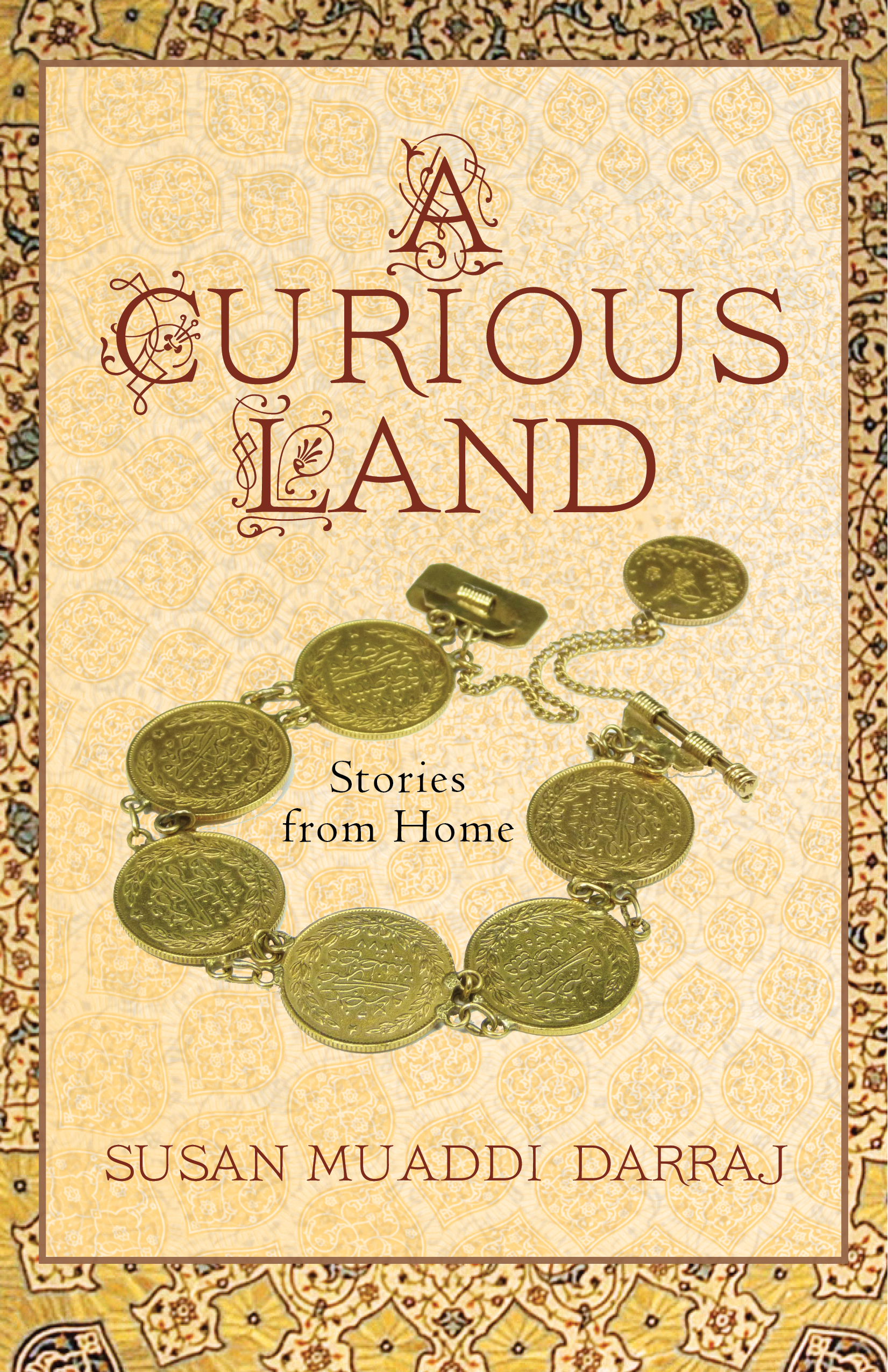
The book jacket of A Curious Land

She is best known for her short story collection, A Curious Land, which won an American Book Award in 2016 and the AWP Grace Paley Prize. The stories are closely linked together, a style known as a mosaic novel. A Curious Land follows the inhabitants of a fictional Palestinian West Bank village, Tel al-Hilou ("the pretty hilltop") and traces their intertwined lives from the era of the Ottoman Empire through the first Intifada. Spanning almost a century, the stories are mostly love stories, set amidst turbulent times. Booklist said, "Darraj writes traditional, tragic love stories set among Orthodox Palestinians during periods of historical unrest. A superb collection and a perfect selection for public libraries." A Curious Land was also shortlisted for a Palestine Book Award.

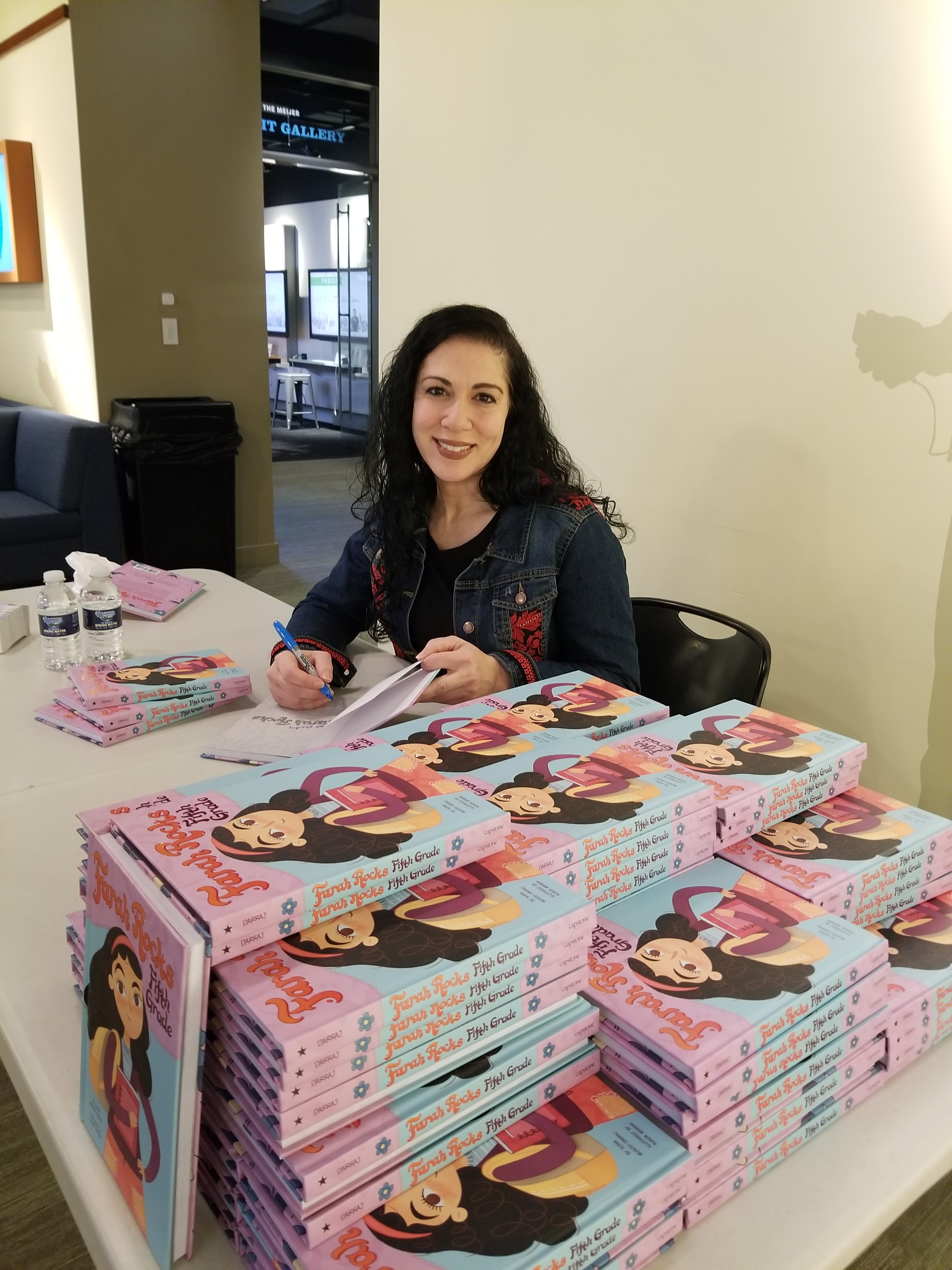
American Writers Museum, Chicago, 2019

=== Farah Rocks ===
In 2020, Muaddi Darraj published a children's book series, Farah Rocks, about a Palestinian American girl named Farah Hajjar. The series, which is the first in North America to feature a Palestinian American or Arab American protagonist, earned a starred book review by the School Library Journal, which said, "Farah is a well-rounded character with ambitions and struggles; readers will identify with her challenges and root for her to succeed. A first purchase for upper elementary readers." The series has received much praise for its groundbreaking portrayal of a happy, healthy and well-adjusted child of Arab immigrants, which contradicts the usual "crisis plot" in which children of color are cast.

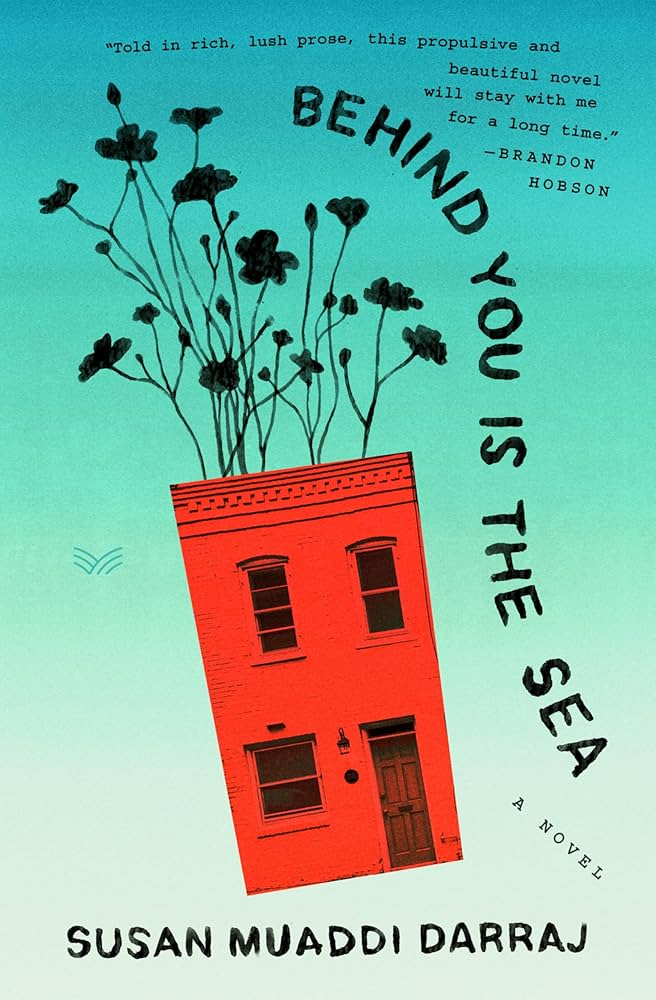
Behind You Is the Sea (HarperVia 2024)

=== Behind You Is the Sea ===
Muaddi Darraj's first novel, Behind You Is the Sea, was published in January 2024 by an imprint of HarperCollins. According to the publisher, "Funny and touching, Behind You Is the Sea brings us into the homes and lives of three main families—the Baladis, the Salamehs, and the Ammars—Palestinian immigrants who’ve all found a different welcome in America. Their various fates and struggles cause their community dynamic to sizzle and sometimes explode." It received positive reviews, including two starred reviews from Kirkus and Booklist, which said, "In this episodic debut novel, Darraj portrays the joys, resentments, and yearnings of three generations of a tight-knit Palestinian American community. . . . Marvelous and moving."

Muaddi Darraj described the book as a mosaic novel, centered on Marcus, a Palestinian American cop, and his father, a Palestinian immigrant—both are eternally at odds with one another. The novel became, she wrote in LitHUb, "a story about Palestinians dealing with the loss of their homeland, as well as with the urgency of living in a country that is, itself, fraught with class tensions and unable to confront its racist past."

Behind You Is the Sea received other accolades, including being noted as a "Best Book of 2024" by Apple Books, the New Yorker, Ms Magazine, the San Francisco Chronicle, and more, including NPR, which said, "If you want to know the challenges that Palestinian Americans face in the U.S., you must read this book. [Behind You Is the Sea] follows several families in Baltimore as they wrestle with poverty, religion, living in between two cultures and their pursuit of the American Dream. . . . How their lives intersect will leave you at the edge of your seat." It was selected by the state of Maryland as part of the Great Reads Program at the 2024 National Book Festival in Washington DC.

=== Other books ===
Muaddi Darraj edited Scheherazade's Legacy: Arab and Arab American Women on Writing, which was published in 2004 by Praeger Publishers. With Waïl Hassan, she co-edited a volume for the MLA's Approaches to Teaching World Literature Series on Nobel Laureate Naguib Mahfouz. She has also contributed book chapters to several anthologies and collections, including Dinarzad's Children: An Anthology of Contemporary Arab American Fiction and Colonize This!: Young Women of Color on Today's Feminism.

Muaddi Darraj authored several young adult biographies, including books about the lives of groundbreaking Americans such as Jackie Robinson and Roberto Clemente (baseball players), as well as Mary Eliza Mahoney (the first African American nurse); she has also written biographies for young readers about famous writers, including Gabriel Garcia Marquez and Amy Tan.

== Articles ==
The topic of diversity in publishing is one of her themes. Muaddi Darraj has written frequently about the need for more diverse book offerings, which benefit all young readers, especially children of color. An op-ed she wrote for the Baltimore Sun, "Black and brown children not represented in children's books," was widely circulated and raised awareness of this issue. She has also written for Middle East Eye and other venues on this topic.

She has written several articles on Arab and Arab American women and feminism, including "Understanding the Other Sister: The Case of Arab Feminism" and "It's Not an Oxymoron: The Search for an Arab Feminism," both of which are widely taught and frequently anthologized.

== Awards ==
- 2022 Maryland State Arts Council - State-level winner
- 2021 Arab American Book Award, Farah Rocks
- 2021 Ruby's Artist Grant, Robert W. Deutsch Foundation
- 2018 United States Artists Ford Fellowship
- 2016 American Book Award, A Curious Land
- 2016 Arab American Book Award, A Curious Land
- 2015 John Gardner Fiction Award
- 2014 Grace Paley Award, Association of Writers and Writing Programs (AWP)

== Cultural advocacy ==
In 2019, Muaddi Darraj launched the #TweetYourThobe social media campaign to promote Palestinian culture and the congressional campaign of Rashida Tlaib. The campaign went viral and garnered much attention for Palestinian women's artwork and Palestinian culture. #TweetYourThobe was covered widely by CNN, The New York Times, Forbes Magazine, Business Insider, NPR, Public Radio International, and other venues. Muaddi Darraj later wrote an essay about how a poem by Langston Hughes inspired her to think of the idea.

== Bibliography ==
- Farah Rocks Book Series (#1-4), Capstone Books 2020-2021
- A Curious Land: Stories from Home (short story collection). University of Massachusetts Press, October 2015.
- Approaches to Teaching the Works of Naguib Mahfouz (co-editor). Modern Language Association of America, 2012.
- The Inheritance of Exile: Stories from South Philly (short story collection). University of Notre Dame Press, 2007.
- Scheherazade's Legacy: Arab and Arab-American Women’s Voices on Writing (editor). Praeger Publishers, August 2004.
