= Joseph Geha =

Author and professor-emeritus at Iowa State University

- Born: 1944; Zahle, Lebanon
- Occupation: Professor-emeritus at Iowa State University

Joseph Geha (born 1944, Zahle, Lebanon), professor-emeritus at Iowa State University, is the author of two books, Through and Through: Toledo Stories, one of the first books of modern Arab-American fiction, and Lebanese Blonde, a novel. He has also published poems, plays, essays and short fiction in periodicals and anthologies such as Esquire, Growing Up Ethnic in America, and The New York Times.

== Education ==
Geha moved to the United States in 1946 with his family, and in 1962 graduated from St. Francis de Sales High School in Toledo, Ohio. He graduated from the University of Toledo in 1966 with a B.A., and 1968 with an M.A. in English. Before coming to Iowa State in 1977, he taught English and Creative Writing at Missouri State University, Bowling Green State University and the University of Toledo.

== Awards ==
Geha was awarded a fellowship from the National Endowment for the Arts in 1988 and a Pushcart Prize in Fiction in 1990. His work was chosen for inclusion in the Permanent Collection, Arab-American Archive, of the Smithsonian Institution. He was named an Arab American Book Award Winner in 2013 for his novel Lebanese Blonde.

== Works ==
- Through and Through: Toledo Stories (1990, Graywolf Press; 2009 second, expanded version, University of Syracuse Press) (short fiction)
- Flyway: Arab American Writing (2002, Iowa State University) (editor)
- Lebanese Blonde (2012, University of Michigan Press) (novel)

== Scholarly criticism ==
- Salaita, Steven (2001). "Sand Niggers, Small Shops, and Uncle Sam: Cultural Negotiation in the Fiction of Joseph Geha and Diana Abu-Jaber" (PDF). Criticism. 43 (4). Retrieved July 30, 2016 – via Project MUSE.
