= The Stardust Thief =

2022 fantasy novel by Chelsea Abdullah

- Author: Chelsea Abdullah
- Language: English
- Series: The Sandsea Trilogy
- Publisher: Orbit Books
- Publication date: 19 May 2022
- Pages: 432
- ISBN: 978-0-316-36876-6

The Stardust Thief is a 2022 fantasy novel by Chelsea Abdullah. It is the author's debut novel and is the first installment in the Sandsea Trilogy. The novel draws inspiration from One Thousand and One Nights. It received positive reviews from critics.

== Plot ==
In the world of the Sandsea Trilogy, jinn are hunted by humans for their magical blood. Jinn once lived alongside humans before they disappeared into the magical Sandsea. Seven jinn rulers, also known as the ifrit, were said to have been especially powerful.

Loulie al-Nazari is the Midnight Merchant. She and her bodyguard Qadir, a fire jinn, sell illegal relics on the black market. Loulie saves the life of Prince Mazen bin Malik after he is attacked by a shadow jinn. The jinn had mistaken Mazen for his brother Omar, leader of the Forty Thieves and an experienced jinn hunter.

Loulie is arrested and brought to the sultan's palace. Sultan Malik orders Loulie to search for an artifact in the lost jinn city of Dhabab. Omar will accompany her. The sultan seeks a magical lamp holding an imprisoned ifrit. The lamp may only be controlled by a member of the sultan's bloodline, but the ifrit must follow the commands of the lamp's owner. Omar uses an enchanted bangle to switch appearances with Mazen, sending him on Loulie's quest instead. Mazen is accompanied by Aisha, one of Omar's thieves. Aisha's village was destroyed by jinn, explaining her hatred for them.

Loulie, Qadir, Aisha, and a disguised Mazen leave the city. An ifrit called the Queen of the Dunes lures them into a set of ruins. They escape with the Queen's relic, a collar made of bones. In the city of Dhyme, the group meets with Ahmed, the city's wali. Ahmed is Loulie's suitor, but she continually rejects him because he is also a jinn hunter. Ahmed is possessed by the collar, but the others are able to save him.

Loulie learns that all relics contain the souls of jinn. She fights with Qadir about the morality of selling relics as though they are simply tools. Mazen realizes that his shadow has become a relic of the deceased shadow jinn.

North of Dhyme, the group is pursued by ghouls and a jinn hunter named Imad. Loulie recognizes Imad as the man who murdered her parents. Imad was hunting an ifrit on Omar's orders when he slaughtered Loulie's tribe. Qadir is apparently killed; the others are captured. Mazen's disguise is revealed. Loulie kills Imad with Qadir's dagger. Aisha's throat is cut; she allows the Queen of Dunes to possess her in order to survive. Qadir returns, revealing that he is the ifrit that Imad was hunting.

In the capital city of Madinne, Omar murders the sultan while disguised as Mazen. Ahmed is killed in this coup. Aisha betrays her companions and joins Omar in his hunt for the lamp.

Loulie, Qadir, and Mazen journey into the Sandsea. They find an underground palace, where they are confronted by Omar and Aisha. Aisha learns that Omar's mother was one of the ifrit. Omar's earring is her relic; it allows him to cast illusions. Aisha and the Queen of Dunes double-cross Omar. Mazen finds the lamp and releases Rijah, the imprisoned ifrit. Omar's Forty Thieves arrive and a battle ensues. Loulie rips out Omar's earring, removing many of his powers. Loulie and Mazen escape to the jinn world with Rijah, promising to find a way to help Qadir and Aisha in the future.

== Themes ==
According to Safia H. Senhaji of Strange Horizons, the idea of storytelling is central to the novel. The main action of the novel is interrupted by interludes in the form of stories imbedded within the main narrative. Abdullah changed numerous aspects of her source material, leading to an exploration of "how people interpret stories, rightly or wrongly, and how truths can be twisted".

== Style ==
Author Amal El-Mohtar praised Abdullah's inclusion of "contemporary Arabic's cadences and vocabulary" in the dialogue and narration of the story. El-Mohtar found the use of language to be authentic, "unlikely to register for anyone who doesn't speak the language, but a pleasant surprise for those who do."

The story alternates between the points of view of Mazen, Loulie, and Aisha, with numerous story interludes.

== Background ==
In an interview with Publishers Weekly, Abdullah explained that she was "homesick" after moving from Kuwait to Boulder, Colorado. She was inspired to write a "love letter" to the oral traditions and stories of her childhood.

== Reception ==
In a starred review, Kirkus called The Stardust Thief "a marvelous plunge into a beautifully crafted adventure", praising its allusions to The One Thousand and One Nights while maintaining its originality. Library Journal also gave the novel a starred review, praising its "fresh perspectives" on common themes including found families and classics retold. Publishers Weekly wrote a starred review calling the novel "an intricate tale that draws from the legends of One Thousand and One Nights to create something entirely new".

In a review for Grimdark Magazine, Fabienne Schwizer called Abdullah an author "to watch", comparing the work positively to the novels of Tasha Suri and S. A. Chakraborty.

Writing for the New York Times, author Amal El-Mohtar praised the novel's use of source material and the use of contemporary Arabic vocabulary. El-Mohtar found the novel to be "a wonderful tumult" despite some issues with irregular pacing.
