= Etaf Rum =

American writer, college teacher

- Born: Brooklyn, New York May 8th, 1989
- Education: North Carolina State University, B.A., B.S., M.A.
- Occupation: Novelist
- Writing career
- Genre: Literary fiction
- Notable works: A Woman is No Man, Evil Eye
- Website: etafrum.com

Etaf Rum is a Palestinian-American novelist and New York Times best-selling author of A Woman is No Man (2019) and Evil Eye (2023).

== Early life and education ==
Etaf Rum was born and raised in Brooklyn, New York City, to Palestinian parents. Her parents grew up in refugee camps in Palestine before immigrating to the United States, and her grandparents also lived out their lives in refugee camps in Palestine. Rum was raised in a traditional family and entered into an arranged marriage at a young age. She then moved to North Carolina where, at the age of 19, she gave birth to her daughter and son two years later.

While raising her children, Rum enrolled in North Carolina State University, where she earned a B.A. in English Language and Literature, a B.S. in philosophy, and an M.A. in American and British Literature and Philosophy.

== Work ==
Echoes of Rum's experience can be found in her debut novel, A Woman is No Man released in 2019. Frustrated by the restrictions on her life and wondering why she could not pursue the kinds of things a man could, her grandmother told her, "Because. You can't do this because you're not a man."

Rejecting that dictum, Rum pursued her education. As she told NPR's Scott Simon:

I maintained my education despite the pressures around me to stay home and take care of my kids, and slowly, as I educated myself… I began to realize my place in the community and the cycle of trauma and oppression that I [would] be giving my daughter—if I don't speak up for what I want to accomplish with my life, if I don't stand up for myself.

While teaching literature at a local community college, the idea of a novel first occurred to her. She realized that literature on the Arab American experience from a female perspective hardly existed and needed to be told.

Rum's second novel Evil Eye was released in 2023 and was named an NPR Best Book of the Year. The story explores themes of intergenerational trauma, mental health and illness, and gendered oppression. In an interview with Shondaland, Rum stated:

I really wanted to paint a very realistic portrait of what some women in the world still struggle with despite the endless feminism, the #MeToo movement that’s given us a voice, and how empowered we are now compared to the previous generations.

== Personal life ==
Rum lives in Rocky Mount, North Carolina with her children; she is divorced. She runs the Instagram account @booksandbeans and posts there about her favorite books each month as a Book of the Month Club Ambassador. Rum has been vocal online about advocating for Palestinian liberation.
