= Farid Matuk =

American poet

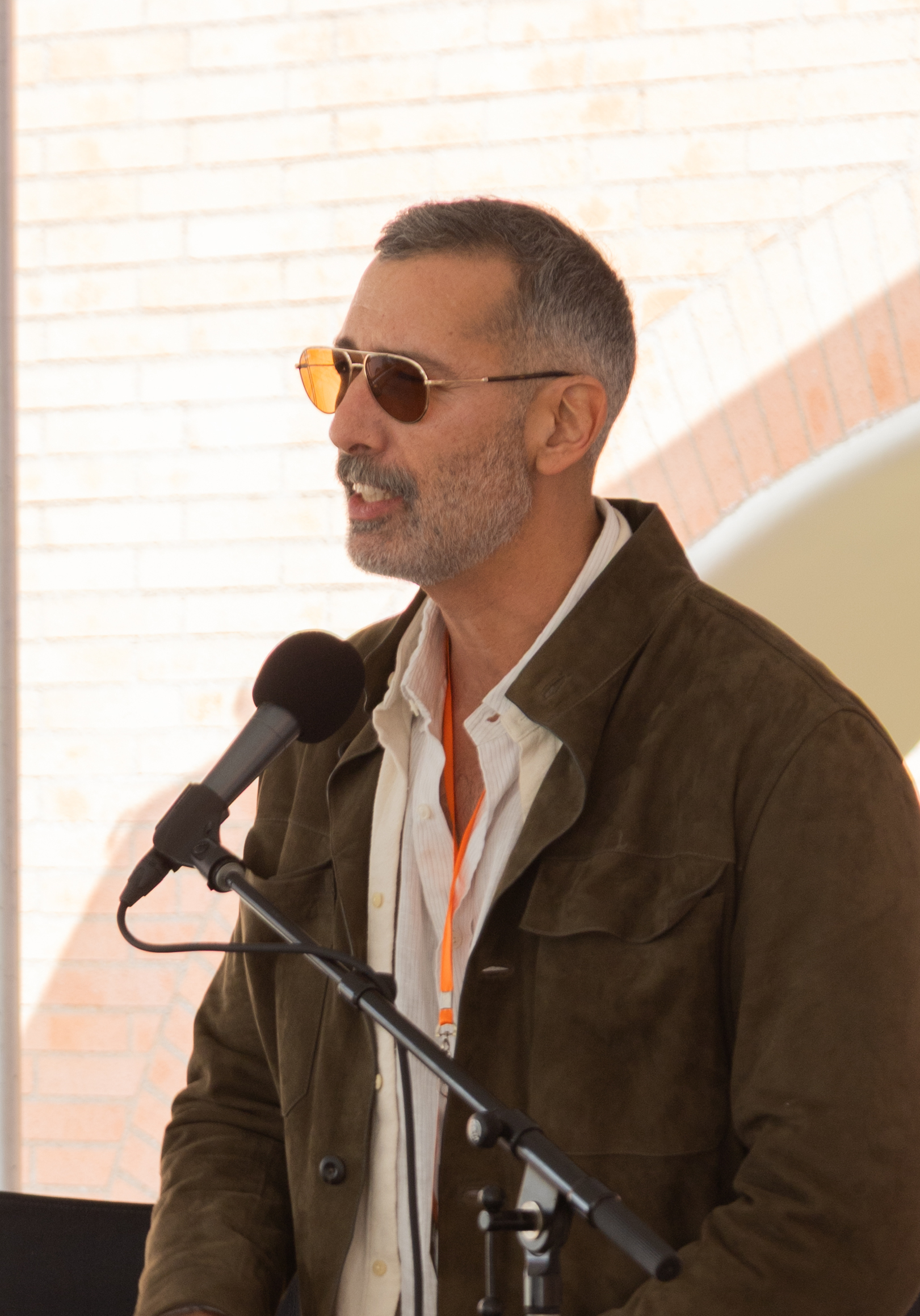
- Matuk in 2025
- Born: Peru
- Citizenship: United States
- Occupations: Poet and educator
- Writing career
- Language: English and Spanish
- Notable works: This Isa Nice Neighborhood, My Daughter La Chola, The Real Horse, Moon Mirrored Indivisible
- Notable awards: Honorable Mention in the 2011 and 2014 Arab American Book Awards, Ford Fellowship and Fulbright Fellowship, United States Artist Fellowship

Farid Matuk is an American poet and educator. His Spanish translations have appeared in Poetry, Kenyon Review, Guernica, Kadar Koli, Translation Review, Mandorla, and Bombay Gin. His poems have appeared in Denver Quarterly, Flag + Void, Iowa Review, The Paris Review, Lana Turner, Bomb Magazine, and Poetry and abroad in White Wall Review (Canada), Critical Quarterly (UK), and Poem: International English Language Quarterly (UK). His book This Isa Nice Neighborhood (Letter Machine, 2010) was the recipient of an Honorable Mention in the 2011 Arab American Book Awards. and was included in The Poetry Society of America's New American Poets series. My Daughter La Chola (Ahsata, 2013) received an Honorable Mention in the 2014 Arab American Book Awards. My Daughter La Chola was also named among the best books of 2013 by The Volta and by The Poetry Foundation while selections from its pages have been anthologized in The Best American Experimental Poetry, 2014, The &Now Awards: The Best Innovative Writing Vol. 3, and in Angels of the Americlypse: An Anthology of New Latino@ Writing. His poems have also been anthologized in Please Excuse This Poem: 100 New Poems for the Next Generation and The Library of America's Latino Poetry. Matuk is the recipient of the Fulbright Fellowship the United States Artist Fellowship. The University of Arizona Press published his second full-length collection, The Real Horse, in 2018 and The University of Chicago Press will publish his third collection, Moon Mirrored Indivisible, in 2025.

== Bibliography ==
Matuk, Farid (2006). Is It The King? Austin: Effing Press.

Matuk, Farid (2010). Riverside. Green River, Vt.: Longhouse.

Matuk, Farid (2010). This Isa Nice Neighborhood. Chicago: Letter Machine Editions.

Matuk, Farid (2013). My Daughter La Chola. Boise: Ahsahta Press.

Matuk, Farid (2018). The Real Horse. Tucson: The University of Arizona Press.

Herrera, Juan Felipe; Matuk, Farid, Anthony Cody, Carmen Gimenez, Eds. (2022) Akrílica. Noemi Press.

Otta, Tilsa; Matuk, Farid, Trans. (2024) Hormone of Darkness. Graywolf Press.

Matuk, Farid (2025). Moon Mirrored Indivisible. Chicago: The University of Chicago Press.
