= Evelyn Shakir =

Literary scholar (1938–2010)

- Born: 1938; West Roxbury, Boston, Massachusetts, U.S.
- Died: 2010 (aged 71–72); West Roxbury, Boston, Massachusetts, U.S.
- Education: Harvard University; Boston University
- Occupations: Academic, author
- Known for: literary scholar

Evelyn Shakir (1938–2010) was a literary scholar. She was a pioneer in the study of Arab American literature, publishing some of the first academic papers to name Arab American literature as a field. She published several books, including Remember Me to Lebanon: Stories of Lebanese Women in America, a 2007 short story collection that won the Arab American National Book Award. Her memoirs were published posthumously as Teaching Arabs, Writing Self: Memoirs of an Arab-American Woman (Boston: Olive Branch Press, 2014). She is remembered on the Boston Women's Heritage Trail, and the Arab American Book Award nonfiction prize was renamed in her honor.

== Career ==
Shakir grew up in West Roxbury, the younger of two children of Lebanese immigrants. She graduated in 1956 from Girls’ Latin School in Boston.

She received a bachelor's degree from Wellesley College, where she studied English. Shakir received a master’s from Harvard and a doctorate from Boston University.

Shakir taught writing for many years at Bentley University in Waltham, where she was a professor emerita, and also taught at other colleges, including Northeastern and Tufts universities. A senior Fulbright scholar, she taught in the Middle East at the University of Bahrain and the University of Damascus.

== Publications ==
In 1997, Shakir published Bint Arab, for which she interviewed Arab-American women and added to their experiences the histories of her mother, Hannah Sabbagh Shakir, and her grandmothers. In part, Shakir used the book to chronicle the gradual shift among children of immigrants, principally from Lebanon and Palestine, as they moved from trying to erase their heritage through assimilation to adding the word Arab when describing themselves as American.

Shakir's short story collection Remember Me to Lebanon: Stories of Lebanese Women in America is set in various eras, from the 1960s to the present and occasionally hark back even to the turn of the twentieth century. Protagonists range in age from a teenager who resists her father’s understanding of honor, to an elderly woman who returns from the grave for one last try at whipping her family into shape. Most of the stories dramatize personal issues involving negotiation between generations and cultures. But others have a political dimension—one is set against the backdrop of the Lebanese civil war; another is a response to 9/11, narrated by a woman who keeps watch all day on the Arab family next door.

Writing about other Arab-American women was the easy part; writing about my own experience took longer and was harder.

— Evelyn Shakir

== Books ==
- Bint Arab: Arab and Arab American Women in the United States. Praeger. 1997. ISBN 9780275956721.
- Remember Me To Lebanon: Stories of Lebanese Women in America. Syracuse University Press. 2007. ISBN 9780815608769.
- Teaching Arabs, Writing Self: Memoirs of an Arab-American Woman. Interlink Publishing. 2013. ISBN 9781623710422. (posthumous)
