= Lisa Suhair Majaj =

Palestinian-American poet and scholar (born 1960)

- Born: 1960 (age 65–66); Hawarden, Iowa, United States
- Education: American University of Beirut, University of Michigan
- Occupations: Poet, scholar

Lisa Suhair Majaj (born 1960) is a Palestinian-American poet and scholar. Born in Hawarden, Iowa, Majaj was raised in Jordan. She earned a B.A. in English literature from American University of Beirut and an M.A. in English Literature, an M.A. in American Culture and a PhD in American Culture from the University of Michigan. In 2001, she moved to Nicosia, Cyprus. Her poetry and essays have been published. In 2008, she was awarded the Del Sol Press Annual Poetry Prize for her poetry manuscript Geographies of Light. "In difficult times, poets and writers have always provided lifelines."

== Works ==
- Going Global: The Transnational Reception of Third World Women Writers (Garland, 2000)
- Intersections: Gender, Nation and Community in Arab Women's Novels (Syracuse University Press, 2002)
- These Words (chapbook, 2003)
- Etel Adnan: Critical Essays on the Arab American Writer and Artist (McFarland Publishing, 2002)
- Geographies of Light, 2009
- Guidelines - by Lisa Suhair Majaj
