= Dima Alzayat =

Syrian American author and associate lecturer

Dima Alzayat is a Syrian American author and associate lecturer.

Alzayat was born in Damascus, Syria and grew up in San Jose, California.

She is author of the short story collection Alligator and Other Stories, published in 2020. She is represented by the Blake Friedmann agency.

Her stories have appeared in the literary magazine Prairie Schooner.

== Awards ==
Alzayat was awarded the Bernice Slote Award in 2015, and in 2018 the Northern Writers' Award. In 2017 she won the Bristol Short Story Prize for her story Ghusl.

In 2019 she won the Authors' Licensing and Collecting Society Tom-Gallon Trust Award for Once We Were Syrians.

In 2021 Alzayat was shortlisted for the Dylan Thomas Prize and James Tait Black Prize for fiction for Alligator and Other Stories.

She was named the 2022-23 Lillian Gollay Knafel Fellow at the Radcliffe Institute for Advanced Study at Harvard University.
