= Chelsea Abdullah =

Kuwaiti-American writer

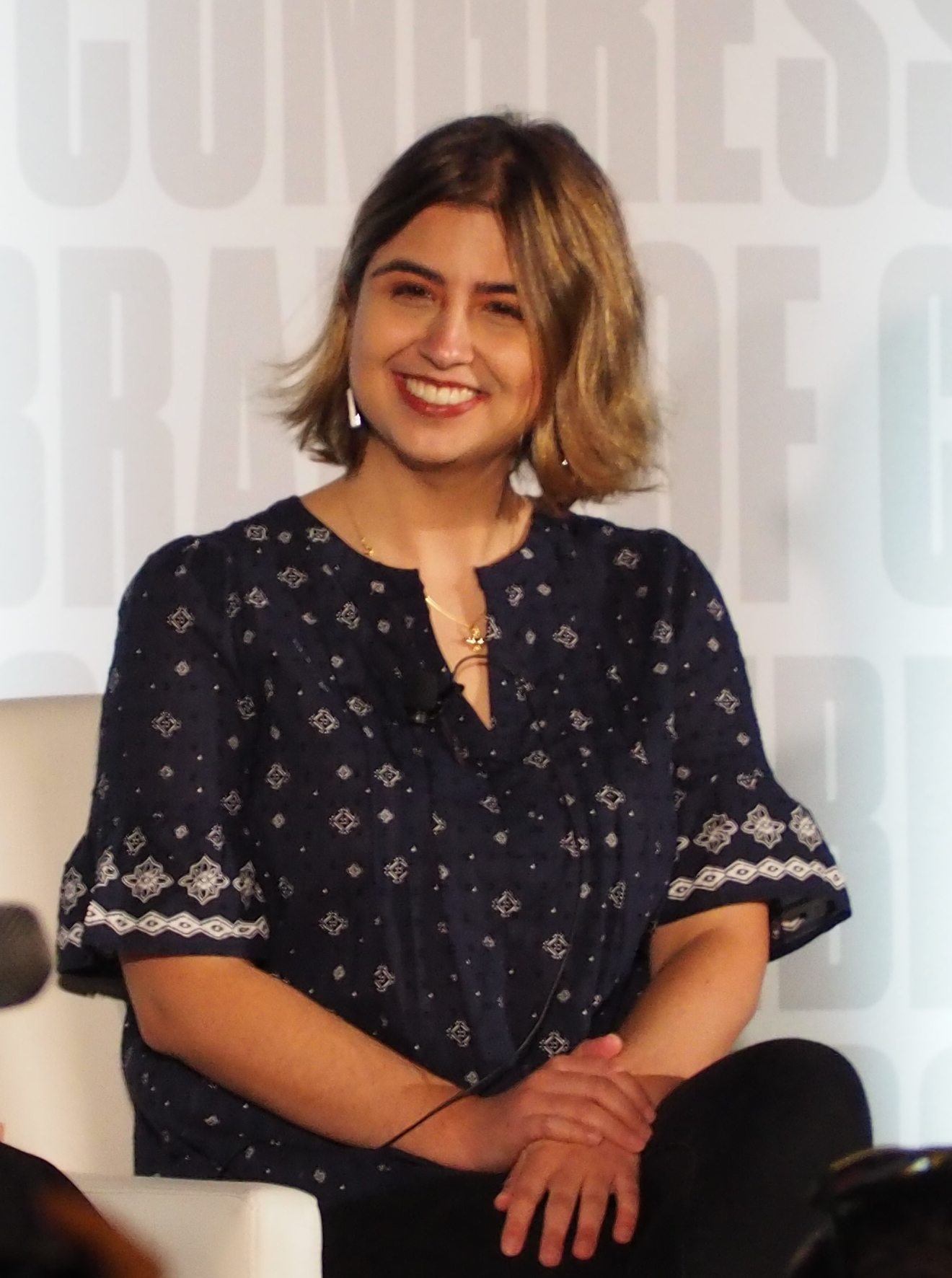
- Abdullah at the 2022 National Book festival
- Education: Duquesne University; University of Colorado Boulder
- Occupation: writer
- Writing career
- Years active: 2022–present

Chelsea Abdullah is a Kuwaiti-American writer. She is the author of the fantastical Sandsea Trilogy.

== Early life and education ==
Abdullah was born and raised in Kuwait. She earned an MA in English from Duquesne University. She graduated from the University of Colorado Boulder.

== Career ==
In 2022, Abdullah published her debut novel, the first of an intended trilogy. Titled The Stardust Thief, it's a story that takes place in a One Thousand and One Nights-inspired fantasy world where jinn are persecuted and hunted for their healing blood, and their enchanted relics are coveted. Publishers Weekly praised Abdullah's "lush descriptions [that] bring the setting to life" and her ability to create a "sense of mystery and enchantment". The New Arab applauded her inclusion of traditional Emirati folk tales and said she "beautifully [weaves] stories within stories, tales within tales."

The third installment of the trilogy is yet to be published.

== Bibliography ==
=== The Sandsea Trilogy ===
- The Stardust Thief, Little, Brown Book Group Limited, 2022. ISBN 9780356517445
- The Ashfire King, Little, Brown Book Group Limited, 2025. ISBN 9780356517469
