= Diana Abu-Jaber =

American author and professor

- ديانا أبو جابر
- Born: Syracuse, New York, U.S.
- Education: State University of New York at Oswego (BA); University of Windsor (MA); Binghamton University (PhD)
- Occupations: Novelist, professor at Portland State University
- Website: www.dianaabujaber.com

Diana Abu-Jaber (Arabic: ديانا أبو جابر) is an American author and a professor at Portland State University.

== Early life and education ==
Abu-Jaber was born in Syracuse, New York. Her father was Jordanian with a Palestinian mother from Jerusalem; Diana's mother was American, descended from Irish and German roots. At the age of seven, she moved with her family for two years to Jordan.

She received a BA in English and Creative Writing from the State University of New York at Oswego, an MA in English and Creative Writing from the University of Windsor, and a PhD in English and Creative Writing from Binghamton University. She divides her time between Miami, Florida and Portland, Oregon.

== Career ==
Abu-Jaber writes about Arab and Arab-American culture and identity, often using the culture of food and food production.

Her academic appointments include: Visiting Assistant Professor, English, Iowa State University (1990); Assistant Professor, English, University of Oregon (1990–1995); and Writer-in-Residence/Professor, English Department, Portland State University (1996–present).

== Bibliography ==
Fiction

- Arabian Jazz (1993) - Oregon Book Award (1994)
- Crescent (2003) - PEN Center USA Award for Literary Fiction (2004), Twenty Noteworthy Novels of 2003 by The Christian Science Monitor
- Origin (2007)
- Birds Of Paradise (2011)
- Fencing with the King (2022)

Nonfiction/memoir

- The Language of Baklava (2005)
- Life Without a Recipe (2016)

Young Adult fiction

- Silverworld (2020)

Essays

- The Other Woman: Twenty-one Wives, Lovers, and Others Talk Openly About Sex, Deception, Love, and Betrayal includes "The Lost City of Love"
