= 2006 Man Booker Prize =

British literary award

The 2006 Man Booker Prize was awarded at a ceremony on 10 October 2006. The prize was awarded to Kiran Desai for her novel The Inheritance of Loss. Desai was the youngest ever female writer to win the Booker Prize.

== Judges ==
- Hermione Lee (chair)
- Simon Armitage
- Candia McWilliam
- Anthony Quinn
- Fiona Shaw

== Shortlist ==
Author	Title	Genre(s)	Country	Publisher
Kiran Desai	The Inheritance of Loss	Novel	India	Hamish Hamilton
Kate Grenville	The Secret River	Novel	Australia	Canongate
M. J. Hyland	Carry Me Down	Novel	Australia, UK	Canongate
Hisham Matar	In the Country of Men	Novel	UK	Viking
Edward St Aubyn	Mother's Milk	Novel	UK	Picador
Sarah Waters	The Night Watch	Novel	UK	Virago

== Longlist ==
Author	Title	Genre(s)	Country	Publisher
Peter Carey	Theft: A Love Story	Novel	Australia	Faber & Faber
Kiran Desai	The Inheritance of Loss	Novel	India	Hamish Hamilton
Robert Edric	Gathering the Water	Novel	UK	Black Swan
Nadine Gordimer	Get a Life	Novel	South Africa	Bloomsbury
Kate Grenville	The Secret River	Novel	Australia	Canongate
M. J. Hyland	Carry Me Down	Novel	Australia, UK	Canongate
Howard Jacobson	Kalooki Nights	Novel	UK	Jonathan Cape
James Lasdun	Seven Lies	Novel	UK	Jonathan Cape
Mary Lawson	The Other Side of the Bridge	Novel	Canada	Chatto & Windus
Hisham Matar	In the Country of Men	Novel	UK	Viking
Jon McGregor	So Many Ways to Begin	Novel	UK	Bloomsbury
Claire Messud	The Emperor's Children	Novel	Canada	Picador
David Mitchell	Black Swan Green	Novel	UK	Sceptre
Naeem Murr	The Perfect Man	Novel	UK	Penguin
Andrew O'Hagan	Be Near Me	Novel	UK	Faber & Faber
James Robertson	The Testament of Gideon Mack	Novel	UK	Hamish Hamilton
Edward St Aubyn	Mother's Milk	Novel	UK	Picador
Barry Unsworth	The Ruby in Her Navel	Novel	UK	Hamish Hamilton
Sarah Waters	The Night Watch	Novel	UK	Virago

== Sources ==
- 2006 Man Booker Prize
