= 2024 Booker Prize =

British literary award given in 2024

- Date: 12 November 2024
- Location: Old Billingsgate, London
- Country: United Kingdom & Ireland
- Website: https://thebookerprizes.com/the-booker-library/prize-years/2024

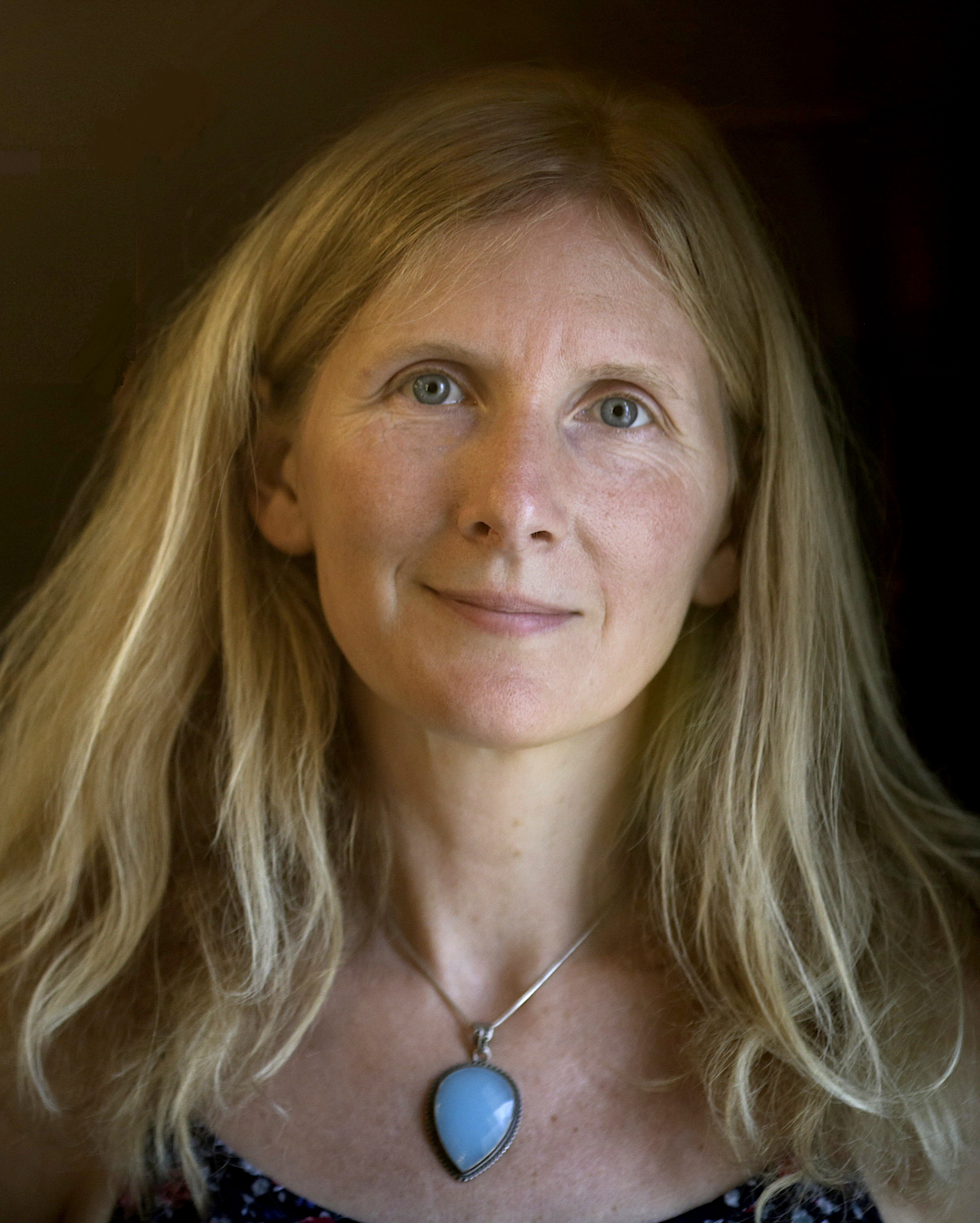
Samantha Harvey, winner of the 2024 Booker Prize

The 2024 Booker Prize is a literary award worth £50,000 given for the best English-language novel published between 1 October 2023 and 30 September 2024 in either the United Kingdom or Ireland. The winner, Samantha Harvey for her sci-fi novel Orbital, was announced on 12 November 2024 at Old Billingsgate in London.

Of the thirteen authors on the 2024 longlist, announced on 30 July 2024, three (Colin Barrett, Rita Bullwinkel, Yael van der Wouden) were debut novelists and six (Percival Everett, Samantha Harvey, Rachel Kushner, Hisham Matar, Claire Messud, Richard Powers) had been nominated previously. The longlist also featured the first Dutch (van der Wouden) and Native American (Tommy Orange) authors ever to be longlisted. Regarding the thirteen novels in the longlist, chair of the judging panel Edmund de Waal stated that the works varied widely in their style and mood, however he stated the works had a common feature exploring the precarious lives of their characters. He stated: "The precarity of lives runs through our longlist like quicksilver."

The shortlist of six finalists was announced on 16 September 2024, with five of the six books being by female authors, the highest number of women shortlisted in the 55-year history of the prize. Harvey had previously been nominated for a Booker Prize when her 2009 debut novel The Wilderness was longlisted for the award. At 136 pages, Orbital was the second shortest novel to be awarded a Booker Prize (with the shortest novel being Penelope Fitzgerald's 1979 winning work Offshore). Orbital was the first novel set in space to win the Booker Prize.

Edmund de Waal stated regarding Harvey: "With her language of lyricism and acuity Harvey makes our world strange and new for us." de Waal also stated that the novel showed the beauty of the world we all share as well as its fragility.

During her acceptance speech, Harvey dedicated her award to those who "speak for and not against the Earth, for and not against the dignity of other humans, other life, and all the people who speak for, and call for, and work for peace".

== Judging panel ==
- Edmund de Waal (chair)
- Sara Collins
- Justine Jordan
- Nitin Sawhney
- Yiyun Li

== Nominees ==
All 2024 nominees are novels.

indicates the winner
indicates shortlisted

Author	Title	Country	Publisher
Colin Barrett	Wild Houses	Ireland	Jonathan Cape
Rita Bullwinkel	Headshot	USA	Daunt Books Originals
Percival Everett	James	USA	Mantle
Samantha Harvey	Orbital	United Kingdom	Jonathan Cape
Rachel Kushner	Creation Lake	USA	Jonathan Cape
Hisham Matar	My Friends	United Kingdom / Libya	Viking
Claire Messud	This Strange Eventful History	Canada / USA	Fleet
Anne Michaels	Held	Canada	Bloomsbury
Tommy Orange	Wandering Stars	USA	Harvill Secker
Sarah Perry	Enlightenment	United Kingdom	Jonathan Cape
Richard Powers	Playground	USA	Hutchinson Heinemann
Charlotte Wood	Stone Yard Devotional	Australia	Sceptre
Yael van der Wouden	The Safekeep	Netherlands	Viking

== See also ==
- List of winners and nominated authors of the Booker Prize
