= Early One Morning (novel) =

2015 novel by Virginia Baily

- Book cover
- Author: Virginia Baily
- Language: English
- Genre: Novel
- Publisher: Little, Brown and Company
- Publication date: 2015
- Publication place: United States
- ISBN: 9780316300391
- OCLC: 900012212

Early One Morning is a 2015 novel by Virginia Baily.

== Synopsis ==
In 1944 in Rome, Italy, a woman named Chiara Ravello rescues Daniele Levi, a Jewish child, before he is deported by the Nazis with his mother. In a flash-forward, Chiara lives alone in Rome in the 1970s and reflects on her life.

== Critical reception ==
Reviewing it for The Guardian, Samantha Harvey described the novel as "incredibly sure-footed, a big, generous and absorbing piece of storytelling, fearless, witty and full of flair." She also noted that it was "a surprisingly humorous novel, in which the characters are tenderly mocked or mock themselves" adding depth to the storytelling. Allan Massie writing for The Scotsman, suggested some passages "might with advantage have been shortened", but he concluded that the novel as a whole was "engrossing".

However, not all reviews were positive. Lucy scholes, also wring for The Guardian, expressed that the conclusion was "a little flat". This sentiment was echoed by Julie McDowall in The Independent, she agreed with Scholes, writing that the "ending is tied up far too fast to be satisfying" Reviewing it for The National, Clare Dight also criticized the end, arguing: "The reader’s most serious criticism will come on the last page, however, when the ink runs out before a final reckoning." Meanwhile, in The Jewish Chronicle, Hephzibah Anderson regretted that Bailey did not write more about the Holocaust, and she concluded: "Baily's decision to look away from the horrors that she nonetheless exploits is a cop-out."

Despite the criticisms, the novel's ability to engage readers with its storytelling and characters cannot be discounted. The mixed reviews also indicate that the novel has sparked meaningful discussions about its content and execution. It's clear that while some aspects may have fallen short for certain reviewers, others found the novel to be captivating and rich in storytelling. This diversity of opinions adds depth to the understanding of the novel and invites readers to consider various viewpoints when approaching the work.
