= Susku Ekim Kaya =

British-Turkish actress (born 1990)

- Born: November 9, 1990 (age 34); Istanbul, Turkey
- Education: London Metropolitan University, Arcola Theatre, 3 Mills Studios
- Occupation: Actress
- Years active: 2014-now
- Known for: 3 Fraeun 1 Streik

Susku Ekim Kaya (born 9 November 1990) is a British-Turkish actress.

== Early life and career ==
Susku Ekim Kaya was born on 9 November 1990 in Istanbul, Turkey and later moved to London. She has studied psychology at London Metropolitan University and graduated in 2016 and meanwhile, she continued her education, she has performed in several theatre performances in many venues including the Arcola Theatre London. She also trained at the International School of Screen Acting in 3 Mills Studio and graduated in 2017 with a screening at BAFTA. She started her acting career with film Diren and has later done various roles in different films, music videos and commercials. In an interview, she mentioned that her family was supportive of her decision to start working as an actress, they discovered her interest in acting on early ages and enrolled her to receive drama education from the age of 9, and when she was in high school she attended to Kadikoy Art Education Center for theater education for one year. She has performed at Arcola Theatre in the Mahmud and Yezida: Turkish Romeo and Juliet play. She also performed in a solo play “A Woman Alone” written by Dario Fo & France Rame in 2014. In 2020, she directed a short film "Will You Be My Quarantine?" and has won awards at several festivals including Istanbul Film Awards and Europe Film Festival. In 2021, Susku Ekim Kaya has been the face of satirical campaign called "The Staunch Test “Best" campaign" that took place in London, UK. It was designed by screenwriter Bridget Lawless, who best known as the writer of the famous British TV series The Bill also the founder of the “Staunch Book Prize”, an award for thriller novels without violence to women. In 2021, she performed in the adaptation of Max Frisch's novel Bluebeard at the Barons Court Theatre.

== Filmography ==
Year	Title	Role	Notes
2014	The Dark Side of the Moon	Allison	Leading Role
2015	Diren	Hazal	Leading Role
2015	Spiralling into Nothing	Marry	Guest Role
2016	Extraterrestrial	Eve	Leading Role
2017	Secret	Gabriella	Supporting Role
2020	Snakebite	Kate	Leading Role
2020	Will You Be My Quarantine?	Su	Leading Role
2021	Couples Retreat	Allison	Supporting Role

== Theatre ==
Year	Title	Role	Notes
2014	Good Doctor By Anton Chekhov	Nina and Olga	Leading Role
2015	Mahmud and Yezida by Murathan Mungan	Nirwan	Supporting Role
2015	A Woman Alone By Dario Fo&Franca Rame	Maria	Leading Role
2021	Bluebeard By Max Frisch	Corinne	Leading Role

== Awards ==
Year	Award	Category	Result
2021	Istanbul Film Awards (Istanbul)	Best Experimental Short	Won
2021	Istanbul Film Awards (Istanbul)	Best First Time Director	Won
2021	Istanbul Film Awards (Istanbul)	Best Film on Virus	Won
2021	Istanbul Film Awards (Istanbul)	Best Poster	Won
2021	Europe Film Festival (UK)	Best Poster	Won
2021	The NY Cat Film Festival (New York)	Best Short	Won
2021	First-Time Filmmaker Online Sessions (UK)	Best Documentary	Nominated
2021	S.O.F.A Tails Film Festival (Cyprus)	Best Short	Nominated
2021	Vesuvius International Film Festival (Italy)	Best Short COVID-19	Nominated
2021	Kalakari Film Festival (India)	Best Film of Fest Special Award	Won
