= The Western Wind =

2018 novel by Samantha Harvey

- Cover of the 1st edition
- Author: Samantha Harvey
- Language: English
- Genre: Literary fiction Historical fiction
- Set in: Medieval England
- Publisher: Jonathan Cape (UK); Grove Press (US)
- Publication date: 2018
- Publication place: United Kingdom
- Pages: 294 (UK); 304 (US)
- ISBN: 978-1-78733-059-7
- OCLC: 1039668773

The Western Wind is a 2018 novel by the English author Samantha Harvey. Set in the Somerset village of Oakham in 1491, it tells the story of the death of Thomas Newman, a wealthy landowner, from the perspective of John Reve, the village priest. The narrative structure is unorthodox, recounting four days in reverse order, beginning with Shrove Tuesday and ending with Shrove Saturday, the day of Newman's disappearance.

The novel initially appears to follow the style of a detective story, as Reve assists the local dean in investigating Newman's disappearance and establishing if any of the villagers played a role in his death. The dean settles on two suspects: the local landowner, Lord Townshend, and Sarah Spenser, a gravely ill woman who falsely confesses to Newman's murder. In the final section (chronologically the first), it is revealed that Reve knew throughout the story that Newman's death was suicide, and that he has hidden the truth from the dean in order to protect Herry Carter, a young parishioner who was with Newman when he died.

Critics praised the book's lyrical prose and the construction of Reve as a character: several described him as an unreliable narrator. The novel drew comparisons with Harvey's earlier works for its philosophical tone and fascination with memory, as well as with the works of Hilary Mantel, Virginia Woolf, Ian McEwan and Marilynne Robinson. Some critics found the historical setting unconvincing, and the novel's philosophical and theological diversions to be ponderous and distracting. The anachronic narration was variously seen as reinforcing the novel's plot, as a source of satisfaction and cleverness, and as an over-complicated distraction from the story. The novel won the 2019 Staunch Book Prize, and was shortlisted for the Walter Scott Prize for historical fiction.

== Background ==
The Western Wind is Harvey's fourth novel, after The Wilderness (2009), All Is Song (2012) and Dear Thief (2014). It was first published in 2018 by Jonathan Cape. In a 2017 interview with Alice O'Keefe, Harvey described the novel as a "medieval murder mystery", a summary which O'Keefe described as "tongue firmly planted in cheek". M. John Harrison, writing in the Guardian, described it as "a medieval detective story", though May-lee Chai, in the Dallas Morning News, wrote that it eschews the tropes of "medieval whodunnits", such as witches, plagues and crusades.

The novel is set in 1491, around Shrove Tuesday, a Christian festival marking the beginning of Lent. In a 2018 interview, Harvey explained the choice of 1491 as "a moment in history just before everything changed", prior to the full effects of the Renaissance and the discovery of the New World. The book was highly anticipated before publication; Francesca Angelini, in the Times, suggested that it was more mass-market friendly than Harvey's previous novels, and could possibly be her "breakout book".

== Plot ==
The Western Wind is set in the village of Oakham, near Bruton in the English county of Somerset, in 1491. The narrator and protagonist is John Reve, Oakham's parish priest. The story is told over four consecutive days, which are related in reverse order: the first chapter takes place on Shrove Tuesday (17 February), while the last occurs on Shrove Saturday (14 February). Each day is divided into several chapters, whose headings often recur throughout the novel.

=== Day 4: Shrove (also Pancake) Tuesday, 17th February 1491 ===
Reve is woken early by Herry Carter, a young parishioner, who tells him that he has seen a body in the river. When they arrive at the site, they find no body, only a fine Dutch shirt, which establishes that the dead man is Thomas Newman, the wealthiest man in Oakham, who had disappeared three days earlier. The rural dean, who has come to Oakham to investigate Newman's disappearance, interrogates Reve, pressuring him to find more information to report to the archdeacon. Reve muses on the threat to Oakham from the monks of Bruton Abbey, who desire to buy the village's land, and on the church's confessional box, which Newman had persuaded him to install after a visit to Rome. Both Carter and Sarah Spenser, a woman suffering from a severe and mysterious sickness, confess to killing Newman, but Reve refuses to accept their confessions. The dean overhears Sarah's confession, and concludes that either she or Lord Townshend, the local landowner, must be treated as Newman's killer. Upon being told this, Reve urges Sarah to leave Oakham, and worries that he has thereby condemned Townshend to death.

=== Day 3: The previous day, Shrove (also Collop) Monday ===
Reve plucks and eats a two-thirds of a goose, given to him by Cecily Townshend, Lord Townshend's wife. He delivers bread and apples to John Fisker and to Sarah. He is questioned by the dean about Purgatory and about Newman. The dean claims to have uncovered a dispute between Newman and Townshend, though Reve dismisses this as an invention. Carter confesses to killing Newman; Reve declares himself unable to forgive what Carter has not done. He preaches a sermon about the titular westerly wind, claiming it to be able to blow Newman's soul into the next world, using a fabricated treatise titled On the Lord's Prudent and Timely Use of the Wind as a prop. He brings Sarah a blanket; she confesses to killing Newman, claiming to have done so with an axe after he did not return her love. Reve refuses her confession, saying that she does not have the strength to kill a man in such a way. He reminisces to the reader about a fire in his childhood, which almost destroyed his home, and about losing his mother in another fire. He hears Newman's voice, ordering him to eat the rest of the goose in atonement for his parish's sins: he does so, and vomits.

=== Day 2: The previous day, Shrove Sunday ===
Reve is woken by the dean, who has come to search his house for evidence. (Note: The full title of the chapter is "Day 2: The previous day, Shrove (also Quinquagesima or, in Oakham burr, King Can't Guess It's Us, or Guessing King, or more simply Guessing) Sunday".) Reve takes confession from Carter, who has been doing good works around the village to atone for his grief over Newman's death; the two reminisce about Newman's arrival in Oakham, twelve years earlier. Reve warns Carter not to repeat his insistence that Newman's death was his fault, for fear of being accused of his murder by the dean. Janet Grant, the churchwarden, confesses to having locked the church on the previous Friday night; she expresses her fear that this may have prevented Newman from entering the church to seek absolution, and therefore caused him to die unforgiven of his sins. Cecily Townshend makes a large donation of ten pounds to the church, which Reve takes as connected to her love affair with the dead Newman, and says that she will leave a goose at Reve's house the following morning. Herry Carter, trying to fix the church roof, falls from his ladder and cuts his head on a slate. Reve takes part in the "weighing of the priest", an annual ritual where he is weighed to ensure that he is lighter than one of his parishioners: this role is taken by the reeve, Robert Guy, having previously been done by Newman. Reve is declared the lighter; he remembers how Newman used to pack his own jacket with rocks, to ensure that he would be the heavier. The dean confronts Reve about the goose, and instructs him to eat it, symbolically devouring his own weakness.

=== Day 1: The previous day, Shrove (also Egg) Saturday ===
The morning after his sister Annie's wedding, Reve is woken – with a hangover – by Newman, who asks him for the last rites. He confesses his intention to drown himself, in the hope that it will allow him to see his wife in heaven. Reve refuses to give him the sacrament, believing that he will not willingly die without it. He is woken just before dawn by Carter, soaking wet, who tells him that Newman has drowned himself, and that he struggled with him, eventually kicking him away to his death. Carter brings him Newman's shirt; Reve tells Carter to hide it, and to concoct an alibi with his wife, Cat. The parishioners realise that Newman is missing; Robert Tunley brings news that a man's body has been found in the river. The villagers go to the river to investigate; Reve finds and conceals Carter's rope belt. He has a messenger sent to the abbey at Bruton, asking for the rural dean to come to Oakham to investigate the death. The dean arrives quickly and sets himself up in Newman's house. Sarah visits Reve, and undresses in front of him: the dean enters the house and sees this. Reve convinces Carter to come to him in the following days, claiming to have found a drowned body in the river. Townshend tells Reve of his worry that the dean will falsely accuse him of Newman's murder and have him burned at the stake; Reve tells him that he would sooner sacrifice himself than allow any of his parishioners to die.

== Reception ==
Eithne Farry, in the Daily Express, gave the book five stars, describing Reve as "naive, clever, often foolish" and Harvey's prose as "luminous [and] wonderfully lyrical". Kirkus Reviews similarly praised the "pensive, false-medieval prose", and the use of repeating chapter titles to suggest an interplay between past, present and future. Angelini considered it "beautifully imagined", but felt that Reve's repeated digressions into the nature of faith and humanity were "ponderous" and detracted from the novel's pace. The Scotsman praised Harvey's decision to avoid antiquated, medieval-style language, though considered that this contributed to a sense that the novel was "unanchored" from its fifteenth-century setting, and detracted from the authenticity of Reve as a character.

Several critics praised Harvey's construction of the character of John Reve. Hannah Pittard, in the New York Times, called him an "everyman ... singular character at once completely unfamiliar and wholly universal". In the Financial Times, Melissa Harrison called the book "a fine character study, and a brilliantly convincing evocation of both time and place". She compared Reve with Brother Cadfael, the protagonist of Edith Pargeter's The Cadfael Chronicles, and labelled him "a wonderful creation". Anthony Cummins, in the Observer, and Bethanne Patrick, in the Washington Post, both described Reve as an unreliable narrator. Malcolm Forbes, in the Minnesota Star Tribune, linked Reve with the unreliable narrator of Harvey's first novel, The Wilderness, who has Alzheimer's disease. Patrick characterised Reve as "simultaneously unstable, intelligent, compassionate, selfish, astute and bumbling". The Scotsman found him not entirely convincing, in part due to the literary and anachronistic nature of his diction.

The novel's narrative structure divided critics. Katy Bowman, in the Washington Independent Review of Books, praised it as strengthening the book's plot. The Scotsman labelled the structure as "awkward, a bit tricksy, and perhaps irritating", but considered that its purpose became clear at the end of the novel, and was potentially satisfying once the reader understood Harvey's intention and "cleverness". Harrison praised the structure for creating what she called "'Ah! moments" for the reader, but wrote that it required a great deal of mental agility, and that re-reading the novel did not fully satisfy the questions raised about earlier chapters by the later parts of the story. She also considered the passages in which Reve contemplates the nature of time an unnecessary indulgence, intended to justify Harvey's narrative decision. Angelini concurred with this judgement, and called the reversed nature of the narrative "irritatingly contrived".

Cummins connected The Western Wind to Harvey's earlier novels via "her abiding theme of how easily memory – a matter of belief – can lapse into self-deception". Angelini wrote that it continued Harvey's "preoccupation with philosophy and what it is to be human". Pittard wrote that the novel "miraculously captures the otherworldly, fish-out-of-water, discombobulating experience of being a liberal American today", citing its atmosphere of mistrust and the dynamic of "all-powerful know-it-all vs. frustrated citizenry".

Bowman wrote that the novel reinforces comparisons previously made between Harvey, Hilary Mantel and Virginia Woolf. Harrison also traced a link between Harvey and Mantel on the grounds of Harvey's historical research, which she described as "exemplary, but lightly worn". In the Arts Fuse, Katharine Coldiron compared the narrative structure with that of Ian McEwan's Atonement, in which the final section reveals the previous two to be fictional writings of one of the characters, and Harvey's prose with that of Marilynne Robinson.

=== Awards ===
Year	Award	Category	Result	Ref.
2018	HWA Crown Award	Gold Crown	Longlisted	
2019	Staunch Book Prize	—	Won	
2019	Walter Scott Prize	—	Shortlisted	
2020	International Dublin Literary Award	—	Longlisted	
