= Orbital (novel) =

2023 novel by Samantha Harvey

- Author: Samantha Harvey
- Language: English
- Genre: Literary fiction Philosophical fiction Science fiction
- Set in: International Space Station
- Publisher: Jonathan Cape (UK); Grove Atlantic (US)
- Publication date: 2 November 2023 (UK); 5 December 2023 (US)
- Publication place: United Kingdom
- Pages: 144 pp
- Awards: Booker Prize; Hawthornden Prize
- ISBN: 978-1-7873-3434-2 (hardcover 1st UK ed.)
- OCLC: 1369677814
- Dewey Decimal: 823/.92
- LC Class: PR6108.A7875 O73 2023

Orbital is a 2023 novel by English novelist Samantha Harvey that incorporates elements of science fiction, literary fiction, and philosophical fiction, published by Jonathan Cape in the UK and by Grove Atlantic in the US. It follows six fictional astronauts over 24 hours on an orbiting space station.

The novel received positive reviews. It won the 2024 Booker Prize and the Hawthornden Prize, and it was shortlisted for the Orwell Prize for Political Fiction and the Ursula K. Le Guin Prize for imaginative fiction.

== Background ==
Harvey watched a continuous live stream of Earth from the International Space Station while writing the novel. She started work on it in the 2010s but stopped writing after about 5,000 words because she felt her limited knowledge of the complex subject of space travel was inadequate to the task. As she told a BBC interviewer, "I thought, 'Well, I have never been to space. I could never go to space ... Who am I to do this?'" In time, however, she stopped worrying about "trespassing in space" and recommenced writing. She completed the book in 2020 during the COVID-19 pandemic in the United Kingdom.

In an interview, Harvey stated that her goal was to write the novel as a "space pastoral", focusing on realism and the beauty of space rather than the speculative nature of science fiction.

== Plot ==
The novel, told over the course of 24 hours, follows six astronauts and cosmonauts from Japan, the United States, Britain, Italy, and Russia, four men and two women, aboard the International Space Station as they orbit Earth. In addition to detailing the official duties and tasks of the astronauts aboard the spacecraft, the novel also features their reflections about humanity and subjects including the nature or existence of God, the meaning of life, and existential threats such as climate change. Each chapter of the novel covers a single 90-minute orbit around Earth, with 16 orbits in the 24 hours.

Orbital draws upon the work and research of Carl Sagan and incorporates the use of the Cosmic Calendar, a concept developed by Sagan in his 1977 book The Dragons of Eden and on his 1980 television series Cosmos: A Personal Voyage.

== Reception ==
Writing for The New York Times, Joshua Ferris said that the position of the astronauts high above the Earth, their relative isolation from the rest of humanity, gave their reflections, their "transporting riffs, those fine rhapsodies!" a new clarity, uncorrupted from biases, tribalism, and conflict as present on Earth. He also wrote that Orbital "contains the world but fails to reflect it. Harvey lavishes the planet with her considerable rhetorical gifts, but the recklessness and miseries we know at pavement level have been scrubbed from her observation deck."

In The Guardian, Alexandra Harris stated that the astronauts' introspection and meditation on humanity was the strength of the novel: "The beauty of the book is at work less in its explicit hymns of praise than deep in its rhythms and structures. And it's here that some of the most compelling thinking goes on – about the spectacular and the ordinary, distance and intimacy". However, she also acknowledges that, "There are moments in Orbital when wonder, like happiness, writes white. Thrilled reports of exquisite light effects start to fall a little flat".

Writing in the Los Angeles Times, Bethanne Patrick said that in featuring the six characters in such close proximity to one another, the work seeks to promote humans' mutual dependence. Patrick concluded: "Harvey manages to bring readers back down to Earth, astounded that they've traveled so far in such a short period of time, having finished their own orbit through the realms of her rich imagination".

Writing for The New Yorker, James Wood stated that the novel contained only a rudimentary plot, in his words: "It's barely a novel because it barely tells a plotted set of human stories, and the stories it does tell barely interact with one another". Wood stated that Harvey's prose vividly portrayed the experience of being in space including the exhilaration of spacewalks, seeing entire continents under one's feet while hurtling through space at 16,000 miles per hour. He explained that using the English language to describe life in space would be difficult but Harvey was able to do so. Wood also commended Harvey for using the vastness of space, the Earth, and the astronauts' own lives to explore metaphysical concepts.

In the Polish online literary journal Dwutygodnik, Ukrainian journalist Tetiana Mykytenko argued that the novel – consciously or not – unthinkingly reproduces the Kremlin's propaganda in the Russian Federation, while the Russian armies are busy wiping out Ukrainian towns and cities. The Japanese astronaut glances at the Kuril Islands and dubs the archipelago "no man's land", though in Japan these islands are known as the Northern Territories under Russian occupation. Mykytenko also cites the reference to real-life former cosmonaut Sergei Krikalev and his present-day links to the Russian annexation of Crimea and Vladimir Putin. Mykytenko's criticism was endorsed by Polish journalist Wojciech Szot in Gazeta Wyborcza, who writes that while aiming to present a vision of a unified world, it glosses over or ignores crucial contemporary developments, such as the Russian invasion of Ukraine. Szot wrote that the book "seems... an ideal novel: mysterious, strange, standing out above the average", and it has some interesting and well written parts, but in fact the work is in many places "derivative... pretentious, boring and banal".

=== Booker Prize ===
The novel won the 2024 Booker Prize for the best novel written in English and published in the UK or Ireland. Artist Edmund de Waal, judging panel chair, said that Harvey's writing transformed the Earth into "something for contemplation, something deeply resonant". With the win, Harvey became the first woman to win the Booker Prize since 2019, when the award was shared by Margaret Atwood and Bernardine Evaristo. The novel was the best selling book of the shortlisted works prior to winning the award. Harvey had previously been nominated for the Booker Prize with the longlisting of her 2009 debut novel The Wilderness. At 136 pages, Orbital was the second-shortest novel to be awarded the Booker Prize (with the shortest being Penelope Fitzgerald's 1979 winning work Offshore). With the 2024 win, the work became the first novel set in space to win the prestigious award. Sara Collins, who was on the judging panel for the award, stated that the book transported her from the many crises on Earth and re-framed those crises, and humanity, in a new relief. Collins stated the judging panel unanimously chose the work for the award, while concluding: "This is a book we need now, but it may also be a book we'll need forever."

== Awards ==
Year	Award	Category	Result	Ref.
2024	Booker Prize	—N/a	Won	
2024	Hawthornden Prize	—N/a	Won	
2024	The InWords Literary Award	—N/a	Won	
2024	Orwell Prize	Political Fiction	Shortlisted	
2024	Ursula K. Le Guin Prize	—N/a	Shortlisted	

== Translations ==
- French: Orbital: Une journée, seize aurores, lit. 'Orbital: One Day, Sixteen Dawns'. Translated by Claro. Paris: Flammarion. 27 March 2024. ISBN 9782080436832.
- German: Umlaufbahnen, lit. 'Orbits'. Translated by Julia Wolf. Munich: dtv. 14 November 2024. ISBN 9783423284233.
- Polish: Orbita, lit. 'Orbit'. Translated by Kaja Gucio. Wydawnictwo Wielka Litera. 12 March 2025. ISBN 9788383602028
- Hebrew: מסלולים, lit. 'Paths'. Translated by Katia Benovich. Keter Publishing House; 2025.
- Dutch: In orbit. Translated by Kitty Pouwels. Amsterdam: De Bezige Bij, 2024. ISBN 9789403135625.
- Spanish: Orbital. Translated by Albert Fuentes. Barcelona: Anagrama, 2025. ISBN 978-84-339-2969-3
- Swedish: Omloppsbanor. Translated by Eva Åsefeldt. Stockholm: Modernista, 2025. ISBN 978-91-8108-509-9
- Turkish: Yörüngede (In Orbit). Translated by Püren Özgören. İstanbul: Türkiye İş Bankası Kültür Yayınları, March 2025. ISBN 978-625-384-029-7
