= Anatomy of a Disappearance =

2011 novel by Hisham Matar

- First edition cover
- Author: Hisham Matar
- Language: English
- Genre: Novel
- Publisher: Viking Press
- Publication date: 3 March 2011
- Publication place: United Kingdom
- Media type: Print (Hardback
- Pages: 256 pp (first edition, hardback)
- ISBN: 978-0-670-91651-1 (first edition, hardback)
- OCLC: 701440455

Anatomy of a Disappearance is the second novel by the award-winning Libyan writer Hisham Matar, first published in 2011 by Viking, an imprint of Penguin Books.

== Plot summary ==
The book follows the story of Nuri, a teenager living in exile with his family in Cairo. After the sudden death of his mother, he also loses his father Kamal Pasha el-Alfi who disappears in mysterious circumstances in Switzerland, and it becomes obvious that he was abducted by the regime of their country (which is never named). The young Nuri tries to come to terms with the disappearance of his father.

== Characters ==
- Nuri el-Alfi - the young teenage narrator
- Kamal Pasha el-Alfi "Baba" "Father" - Nuri's father
- Ihsan "Mother" - Nuri's mother
- Mona - Nuri's Stepmother
- Taleb - Kamal Pasha's best friend
- Hydar - Kamal Pasha's best friend
- Naima - el-Alfi's young Egyptian maid
- Hass - Kamal Pasha's Swiss confidant
- Fadhil - Nuri's uncle
- Salwa - Nuri's aunt
- Souad - Nuri's aunt

== Reviews ==
- The Guardian - Hermione Lee
- The Independent - David Mattin
- Financial Times - Ángel Gurría-Quintana
- The National - Luke Kennard
- The Observer - Tim Adams
