= The Safekeep =

2024 novel by Yael van der Wouden

- Author: Yael van der Wouden
- Language: English
- Publisher: Simon & Schuster
- Publication date: 2024
- Publication place: Netherlands
- Pages: 272
- ISBN: 9781668034361

The Safekeep is the 2024 debut novel from Dutch author Yael van der Wouden. The novel, set in 1961 Netherlands, tells the story of Isabel (Isa), a recluse who is living alone and meticulously tending to the family home in Overijssel province. She receives an unexpected guest when her brother Louis asks that his girlfriend Eva move into the home to stay with Isabel for the summer. Isa is initially repulsed by Eva, and feels that her personal space has been encroached upon. However, as they spend more time together, an unlikely romantic relationship develops between the two women.

The novel won the 2025 Women's Prize for Fiction and was shortlisted for the 2024 Booker Prize.

== Narrative ==
Isabel (Isa) is living in her family's home in 1961 Netherlands, in the Overijssel province. She lives alone but has assistance from her maid Neelke. The home was acquired by her uncle Karel during World War II and Isabel's family (including her mother, and two brothers; Hendrick and Louis) moved in during the war. Her brothers moved out of the home, Hendrick living in Den Haag with his boyfriend Sebastian and Louis with various girlfriends that come and go. Isa is lonely and stricken with guilt after the death of her mother. She wanders the home meticulously and obsessively dusting and cleaning and berating the maid Neelke for presumably stealing small items from the home.

The three siblings meet in Amsterdam and Isa meets Louis' new girlfriend Eva towards whom she is suspicious and unfriendly. Isa does not feel comfortable around the more sociable and charming woman. Later, Louis asks Isa to take Eva in for a few months as he travels. Uncle Karel had willed the home to Louis with the plan to move into the home once he is married. Isa is only a custodian of the house, a caretaker, she reluctantly agrees. Initially Isa is perturbed by Eva as she moves freely around the house, moving objects, touching things, and asking probing questions about the family's previous life in the house. Isa feels that her space has been encroached upon. Louis sets up Eva in Isa's mother's old room, and Eva places a picture of her own mother in the picture frame.

One day Hendrick and his boyfriend come to visit and a spontaneous moment of bliss occurs as the two men and Eva start dancing. Eva asks Isa to join in and all four join in dance. Isa begins to develop romantic feelings for Eva and the two begin a relationship.

It is later revealed that Isa's family was able to obtain the house during World War II when the former Jewish occupants were forcibly abducted from their home during the Holocaust in the Netherlands.

== Reception ==
Writing for The New York Times, Lori Soderlind stated that the character Isa was portrayed with great detail, especially how van der Wouden narrated her transition from an anxious, isolated, recluse to a more loving partner who experiences a sexual and emotional re-awakening. Reviewing the novel for The Guardian, Rachel Seiffert stated that the sex scenes, indeed an entire chapter devoted to a sexual interaction, were overly long and did little to move the plot along. However Seiffert stated the strength of the novel was in the powerful revelations in the inspired third act. Writing for The Observer, Joe Moshenska felt that the novel explored difficult themes by narrating how many Dutch characters had profited from the suffering of others and were unwilling to acknowledge their pasts. He stated the novel was "unsparing in its dissection of the lies that individuals, families, and nations tell themselves." In a starred review, Kirkus Reviews called the novel "A brilliant debut, as multifaceted as a gem."
