= Emma Hooper =

Canadian writer

Emma Hooper is a Canadian writer. She is most notable for her 2018 novel Our Homesick Songs, which was named as longlisted for the 2018 Scotiabank Giller Prize.

Born and raised in Alberta, Hooper moved to England in 2004 after completing her Bachelor of Arts in music and writing at the University of Alberta. She completed a Master of Arts in creative writing at Bath Spa University before undertaking a Doctor of Philosophy in creative and critical writing at the University of East Anglia, which she completed in 2010. She subsequently taught at Bath Spa University. Her debut novel, Etta and Otto and Russell and James, was published in 2015, and was a shortlisted finalist for the amazon.ca First Novel Award. Our Homesick Songs followed in 2018.

We Should Not Be Afraid of the Sky was longlisted for the inaugural Carol Shields Prize for Fiction in 2023. In 2025, Etta and Otto and Russell and James was a finalist for Canada Reads, championed by Michelle Morgan.

She teaches regularly for Arvon, and runs writing courses annually in Spain with the author Samantha Harvey.

== Bibliography ==
- Etta and Otto and Russell and James. Simon & Schuster. 2015. ISBN 978-1-4767-5567-0.
- Our Homesick Songs. Simon & Schuster. 2018. ISBN 978-1-5011-2448-8.
- We Should Not Be Afraid of the Sky. Penguin Canada. 2023. ISBN 978-0-735-23276-1.
