= The Return (memoir) =

2016 memoir by Hisham Matar

The Return: Fathers, Sons and the Land in Between
- Author: Hisham Matar
- Language: English
- Genre: Memoir
- Publisher: Random House; Viking Press
- Publication date: June 2016
- Publication place: United States
- Media type: Print (hardback and paperback), e-book, audiobook
- Pages: 304
- Awards: Slightly Foxed Best First Biography Prize (2016); Pulitzer Prize for Biography or Autobiography (2017); Folio Prize (2017); PEN/Jean Stein Book Award (2017)
- ISBN: 978-0-670-92333-5 (Hardcover)

The Return: Fathers, Sons and the Land in Between is a memoir by Hisham Matar that was first published in June 2016. The memoir centers on Matar's return to his native Libya in 2012 to search for the truth behind the 1990 disappearance of his father, a prominent political dissident of the Gaddafi regime. It won the 2017 Pulitzer Prize for Biography or Autobiography, the inaugural 2017 PEN/Jean Stein Book Award and the 2017 Folio Prize, becoming the first nonfiction book to do so.

== Synopsis ==
In 1990, Hisham Matar's father, a prominent critic of Muammar Gaddafi's dictatorship, was kidnapped by Gaddafi's agents and imprisoned in Libya. Matar never saw his father after that. The memoir follows Matar's return to Libya in 2012, following Gaddafi's death, to find out what happened to his father.

== Reception ==
=== Critical response ===
The Return was critically acclaimed. It was named as one of the 10 best books of 2016 by the editors of The New York Times Book Review and The Washington Post.

Writing for The Guardian, writers Julian Barnes, Alan Hollinghurst, Blake Morrison, Rupert Thomson, Lucy Hughes-Hallett and Chimamanda Ngozi Adichie named The Return as one of their favorite books of 2016, with Adichie noting that it "moved [her] to tears and taught [her] about love and home." Writing for The New York Times, Pulitzer Prize-winning critic Michiko Kakutani selected the book as one of her top 10 books of 2016, describing it as part "detective story", part "story of exile" and part "story of what's happened in Libya and the Middle East."

=== Accolades ===
The Return won the 2017 Pulitzer Prize for Biography or Autobiography and the 2017 Folio Prize, becoming the first nonfiction book to do so. It also won the inaugural 2017 PEN/Jean Stein Book Award and the 2016 Slightly Foxed Best First Biography Prize. The memoir was a finalist for the 2016 Baillie Gifford Prize, 2016 Costa Biography Award, 2017 National Book Critics Circle Award and 2017 Los Angeles Times Book Prize. It was listed by the New York Times in 2024 as one of the best 100 books of the 21st century.
