= My Friends (Matar novel) =

2024 novel by Hisham Matar

- Author: Hisham Matar
- Language: English
- Publisher: Penguin Random House
- Publication date: 2024
- Publication place: United Kingdom/Libya
- Pages: 416
- ISBN: 9780812994841

My Friends is a 2024 novel by Hisham Matar published by Penguin Random House. The novel tells the story of three Libyan friends living in London as exiles from their country. The story follows their intertwined lives from the 1980s to the 2011 Arab Spring. Fearing retribution from the Gaddafi regime, they are fearful of returning to their own country or contacting their families.

Similar to Matar' previous works, the novel focuses on themes of government oppression and violence, as well as the lives of exiles abroad.

The novel was nominated for several awards; it was longlisted for the 2024 Booker Prize, nominated for the 2024 National Book Award for Fiction, and won the Orwell Prize for political fiction and the 2025 National Book Critics Circle (NBCC) Award for fiction.

== Narrative ==
The narrator, Khaled, grows up in Libya and leaves as a young adult in 1983 to study at the University of Edinburgh. While at university, he befriends fellow student Mustafa, who is also from Libya. The two friends attend an anti-Gaddafi protest outside the Libyan embassy in London in 1984. Individuals from inside the Libyan embassy open fire on the protestors. Khaled and Mustafa are both wounded in the attack and spend weeks recovering in hospital under police guard. Khaled and Mustafa are later released from the hospital and granted political asylum in the UK. Khaled, fearing retribution from the Libyan government, is afraid to travel back to Libya or contact his family. He is fearful that the Libyan government identified him at the protest and may target him in the future. He is afraid to contact his family back home, fearing his letters, phone calls, or other communication will be intercepted by the government. Khaled begins his new life in London and forms a long-term relationship with Mustafa. The two men also befriend Hosam, who is a writer from Libya. One of Hossam's anti-Gaddafi short stories is read on the BBC Arabic World Service. After the broadcast, the presenter is murdered near the Regents Park Mosque in London by the Libyan secret police. Throughout their years in London, the three men share a close friendship; however, their lives are pervaded by constant fear and wariness.

During the 2011 Arab Spring uprisings across the Middle East, the three men are faced with a momentous decision: stay in London in their current lives or return to Libya. Mustafa joins a Libyan militia and fights against the Gaddafi regime. Initially, Hossam stays in London, then returns home, falls in love, and joins Mustafa in fighting the dictatorship. After becoming disenchanted with the post-revolutionary government, he emigrates to America. Khaled, content with his life as a schoolteacher, chooses to stay in London.

== Reception ==
Writing for The New York Times, Peter Baker stated that the prose was easier to follow than Matar's previous works, making navigating the novel and plot easier for readers. Baker concluded that Matar's work was "a masterly literary meditation on his lifelong themes." Writing for The Guardian, Lucy Hughes-Hallett stated that the novel's prose slowed down in areas to highlight the characters' inner thoughts, with Khaled's walks in London serving as a template to introduce his inner thoughts. She commended this fluctuation in prose, stating that the novel is "artfully paced."
