= Colin Barrett (author) =

Irish Canadian writer (born 1982)

- Born: 26 April 1982 (age 44); Fort McMurray, Alberta, Canada
- Education: University College, Dublin
- Occupation: Writer

Colin Barrett (born April 26, 1982) is an Irish Canadian writer. He launched his writing career with the 2009 publication of "Let's Go Kill Ourselves" in The Stinging Fly, upon which he fostered a relationship with the magazine's co-founder, Declan Meade. In 2013, The Stinging Fly Press published Young Skins, a cycle of seven stories set in the fictional town of Glanbeigh, County Mayo. Barrett followed the critical success of his first short story collection with a second, Homesickness, in 2022; its eight stories, like their predecessors, were met with critical acclaim.

Barrett received multiple awards for Young Skins. These included the Frank O'Connor International Short Story Award, the Guardian First Book Award, and the Rooney Prize for Irish Literature in 2014. Two of his short stories, "Bait" and "The Clancy Kid," were adapted for the stage and debuted at the New Theatre, Dublin in 2017. A film adaptation of Calm with Horses, the novella included in Barrett's Young Skins, was screened at the Toronto International Film Festival in 2019.

Barrett's first novel, Wild Houses, was longlisted for the 2024 Booker Prize.

== Early life and education ==
After Barrett's 1982 birth in Fort McMurray, Canada, he and his family moved to Toronto. Upon leaving Canada for Ireland at the age of four, Barrett spent his childhood in Knockmore, between Ballina and Foxford in County Mayo, with his four siblings and his parents. He was on Gaelic football teams as an adolescent in Ballina.

Barrett studied at University College, Dublin (UCD), and was awarded a BA degree in English, 2003; an MA in Creative Writing, 2009; and an MFA in Creative Writing 2015.

== Career ==
Barrett started his literary career with comic books during his childhood before he moved on to poetry and books as an adult. For his earlier works, Barrett "spent 10 years not finishing anything". One of the short stories that Barrett did not finish was titled "Ontario". In between his college studies, Barrett was hired by Vodafone as a customer representative, from 2003 to 2008.

Barrett's first published short story, "Let's Go Kill Ourselves", appeared in the Winter 2009–10 issue of The Stinging Fly literary magazine. During the following years he worked on material that would later feature in Young Skins, a cycle of seven stories set in the fictional town of Glanbeigh. "Calm With Horses", the fifth story in the collection, is written in novella form. During the COVID-19 pandemic, Barrett completed two books. In 2022, he released Homesickness, which consisted of eight new stories. Of these, seven were set in County Mayo and one, The Low, Shimmering Black Drone, in Toronto.

Between 2014 and 2018, director Nick Rowland worked on adapting Calm with Horses into a film of the same name. In 2019, Calm with Horses debuted at the Toronto International Film Festival and starred Cosmo Jarvis and Barry Keoghan in leading roles. Bait and The Clancy Kid, both of which were published in Young Skins, were made into plays for New Theatre, Dublin in 2017.

Barrett's debut novel, Wild Houses, was published in January 2024.

== Writing process and themes ==
When asked about the process by which he wrote the stories within Young Skins, Barrett noted that he would "look for one tiny detail and expand upon it". He also focuses on the people instead of the events to make his works. Some of his inspirations include Flannery O'Connor and Denis Johnson. With Let's Go Kill Ourselves, Barrett created Dunvale, Ireland, for his short story. In a 2024 Sunday Independent article by Barrett, he explained that "[right] from the earliest drafts of Wild Houses, I associated Nicky with her car."

The seven stories within Young Skins are set in the fictional town of Glanbeigh, Ireland. With Homesickness, Barrett continued to use locations in Ireland, while also using Canada for one of his short stories. Some of the topics that Barrett wrote about were about a missing child with The Clancy Kid. With A Shooting in Rathreedane, Barrett wrote about a member of the Garda who investigates a shooting. Wild Houses is about a gang kidnapping that "takes place during the Salmon [Festival] ... in Ballina, County Mayo."

== Awards and personal life ==
During the 2010s, the Arts Council gave Barrett a bursary three times. At the Irish Book Awards in 2013, Barrett was nominated for the Writing.ie Short Story of the Year award with Bait and the Sunday Independent Newcomer of the Year award with Young Skins. For Young Skins, Barrett received the 2014 Frank O'Connor International Short Story Award. Additional awards that Barrett won in 2014 with Young Skins were the Rooney Prize for Irish Literature and the Guardian First Book Award In 2015, the National Book Foundation selected him as one of their 5 Under 35.

In 2024, Barrett was shortlisted for the Nero Book Awards for Wild Houses. It was longlisted for the 2024 Booker Prize. Wild Houses was nominated for the Trillium Book Award, English category in 2025. The book also received a Dublin Literary Award nomination that year. Barrett is married and has two children.

== Biblio ==
- Young Skins (2013)
- Homesickness (2022)
- Wild Houses (2024)
