= Tommy Orange =

American writer (born 1982)

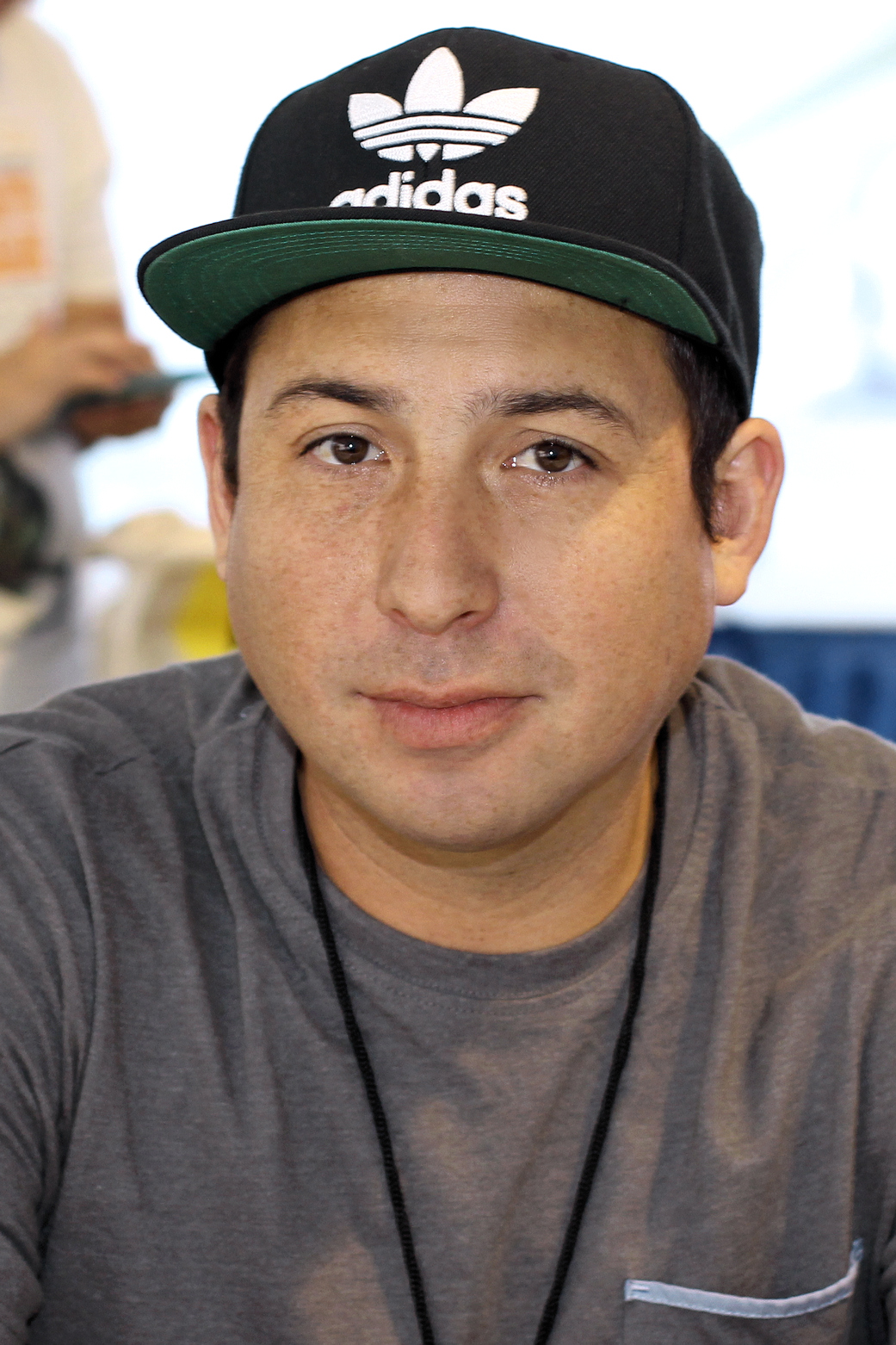
- Orange in 2018 in Texas
- Born: January 19, 1982 (age 44); Oakland, California, U.S.
- Education: Institute of American Indian Arts (BS, MFA)
- Occupation: Writer
- Writing career
- Notable works: There There; Wandering Stars
- Notable awards: John Leonard Prize (2018); PEN/Hemingway Award (2019); American Book Award (2019); MacArthur Fellows Program (2025)

Tommy Orange (born January 19, 1982) is an American novelist and writer from Oakland, California. His first book, There There (2018), was a finalist for the 2019 Pulitzer Prize for Fiction and received the 2019 American Book Award. In October 2025, Orange was awarded a MacArthur Foundation Fellowship.

Orange earned a master's degree in fine arts from the Institute of American Indian Arts. He was born and raised in the Dimond District of Oakland, California, and resides there.

== Early life ==
Orange was born in Oakland, California, on January 19, 1982. From age 14 to 24, Orange played roller hockey on a national level. He began playing music at the age of 18. Orange's father was a Native American ceremony leader, while his white mother converted for a time to Christianity. After graduating from SAE Expression College with a Bachelor of Science degree in sound arts, Orange worked at Gray Wolf Books, a bookstore in San Leandro, where he developed a passion for reading and thus began writing.

== Education ==
Orange obtained a bachelor's degree in audio engineering and later a Master of Fine Arts from the Institute of American Indian Arts (IAIA). He now teaches at the IAIA in Santa Fe, New Mexico.

== Writing career ==
In addition to his novels, Orange has published a profile of a Native American teen (17-year-old Jeffrey Martinez) for Esquire magazine in 2019, portraying what life is like for a Native American today. Orange has also published short stories in the literary magazines McSweeney’s, Zoetrope: All-Story, and Zyzzyva.

Orange participated in an episode of The Archive Project at the 2019 Sun Valley Writers' Conference. In the episode, he states that in many ways There There was for his dad and about his dad, whom he described as someone "very secure in their Indianness and doesn’t necessarily teach it to their kids".

Orange's second novel, Wandering Stars, was featured on the cover of the March 2024 issue of BookPage magazine. The cover story featured an article by Orange regarding the inspiration and process of completing the novel. He expressed significant concern that a follow-up novel to There There could be perceived as "lowbrow" before it was released. He wrote that a sequel felt "Like it belonged in the Marvel-Universe of decision-making, like people would think it was a cash grab even though I made the decision before the success of There There". He also stated that the title of the novel was inspired by the 1994 song "Wandering Star" by Portishead.

=== Inspiration for There There ===
Orange has said that his inspiration for There There came in a single moment. At the time, he was working in a digital storytelling booth at the Native American Health Center and also at a nonprofit founded by the University of California, Berkeley, called Story Center. His roles were to record oral stories and to staple and make copies of grants, burning sage, and sending them off with a prayer. This work led him to realize that the stories of urban Natives needed to be heard, especially by other urban Natives so they would be able "to see their own stories reflected in a bigger way". Orange said that "Native people are pretty invisible" and he wanted to tell a story about a community that people knew too little about. He believes that hearing a story similar to one's own is powerful and helps people to feel that they exist, and belong to a real community. Orange has said that feeling out of place makes it harder to be a strong human being. It was his goal to expand the range of what it meant to be Native.

=== Awards and nominations ===
Orange received the John Leonard Prize in 2018, which is awarded for an author’s first book in any genre. In 2019, he received the PEN/Hemingway Award, which is dedicated to first-time authors of full-length fiction books, and the American Book Award, denoting "an outstanding literary achievement".

There There also received nominations for other recognitions, including the Andrew Carnegie Medal for Excellence in Fiction, the Pulitzer Prize for Fiction, the Audie Award for Multi-voiced Performance, and two from Goodreads Choice Awards: Best Fiction and Best Debut Goodreads Author. It was selected by the American Library Association as a Notable Book in 2025.

Wandering Stars was longlisted for the 2024 Booker Prize.

In October 2025, Tommy Orange was awarded a MacArthur Foundation Fellowship, popularly known as the MacArthur Foundation's "Genius Awards."

== Personal life ==
Orange lives in Oakland, California, with his wife.

== Works ==
=== Novels ===
- There There (Alfred A. Knopf, 2018. ISBN 978-0525520375)
- Wandering Stars (Alfred A. Knopf, 2024. ISBN 978-0593318256)

=== Short stories ===
- "Capgras" in Never Whistle at Night: An Indigenous Dark Fiction Anthology (September 19, 2023)

== See also ==
- List of writers from peoples indigenous to the Americas
