= The Woman Upstairs (novel) =

2013 novel by Claire Messud

- First edition
- Author: Claire Messud
- Language: English
- Publication date: 2013
- Publication place: United States

The Woman Upstairs is a novel by Claire Messud that was published in 2013 by Alfred A. Knopf. Set in Cambridge, Massachusetts, the novel is told from the point of view of Nora Elridge, an elementary school teacher reflecting back on her life in 2004 when she became enchanted with the Shahids, a family of intellectuals she met while teaching their young son Reza.

== Plot ==
Nora Elridge is an elementary school teacher living in Cambridge, Massachusetts who was raised by her frustrated stay at home mother to have artistic ambitions, ambitions which she was never able to fulfill. In 2004, when Nora is 37, a little over a year after her mother's death, she is delighted to learn that a young Parisian boy, Reza Shahid, has been assigned to her classroom. After Reza is bullied Nora meets his mother, Sirena Shahid, who she learns is an acclaimed artist. When Nora reveals that she makes art as well, Sirena suggests that they rent a studio together. Nora agrees and begins working on her own project, a series of shoebox size dioramas of the rooms of famous women artists.

Nora grows increasingly enamoured of the Shahids including Lebanese born Skandar, a professor. She crosses personal boundaries with them, not only by agreeing to rent the studio with Sirena, but by eventually agreeing to babysit Reza for free on nights when Skandar and Sirena have dinner engagements.

Sirena eventually unveils her project entitled "Wonderland" a mixed media piece in which she creates, and then films, a world based on Alice in Wonderland which Nora assists her in working on. During the project Nora begins to think she has fallen in love with Sirena but hesitates to tell her so. Instead, drawn closer to Skandar, she ends up having an intimate encounter with him one night at the studio, an event they quickly agree cannot be repeated.

Shortly after Sirena completes all the work she can in Cambridge and must return to Paris.

Nora remains obsessed with the Shahids for years and tracks Sirena's meteoric rise in the art world. Four years after they returned to Paris Nora's aunt dies leaving her an inheritance. Nora decides to take a sabbatical and plans a European vacation where she can go to Paris and spend time with the Shahids. After an uneventful dinner Nora realizes that there is an exhibit of Sirena's work being shown at a small gallery which Sirena did not mention. Nora goes there and sees that the exhibit is composed of short films made in Wonderland and that each video is being reproduced only five times. One of the videos, which is sold out, was shot in Cambridge and Nora realizes it was taken when she was drunk and alone in the studio and dressed up like Edie Sedgewick and masturbated. She also realizes the night she had with Skandar was also likely filmed. Unsure of what it means, but furious that she has been used Nora vows to use her rage to begin living for the first time.

== Reception ==
The novel received mixed positive reviews. Quill & Quire praised Messud's prose but called the book "a slog".

The novel was longlisted for the 2013 Giller Prize but ultimately did not make the shortlist.
