= This Strange Eventful History =

2024 novel by Claire Messud

- First edition cover
- Author: Claire Messud
- Cover artist: Jaya Miceli
- Language: English
- Genre: Historical fiction
- Published: 2024 (W. W. Norton
- Publication place: United States
- Pages: 448 (Hardcover, first edition)
- ISBN: 978-0-393-63504-1

This Strange Eventful History is a historical fiction novel by Claire Messud. It was published on May 14, 2024 to critical acclaim. The novel was longlisted for the 2024 Booker Prize and the 2024 Giller Prize.

== Plot ==
The book is a family saga following the Cassar family from 1940 to 2010. The Cassars are members of the pieds-noir diaspora, displaced from Algiers during World War II. They move from place to place after being displaced, living in the United States, Canada, Australia, France, and elsewhere at different points in time. As the youngest members of the Cassar family grow up, they learn more about the family's colonial history.

== Development history ==
Messud was inspired to write the book by her own family history, which had been preserved by her grandfather in a 1,500-page book. The Cassars' journey within the book mimics the Messud family's evolution after Algerian independence. In an interview with Shelf Awareness, Messud described the book as being "about the interconnectedness of our small personal lives and the big historical events always unfolding around us".

The book's title was inspired by a soliloquy from the William Shakespeare play As You Like It.

=== Publication history ===
This Strange Eventful History was published in the United States on May 14, 2024, by W. W. Norton & Company.

== Reception ==
In a starred review, Publishers Weekly praised the book's characters and Messud's "artful prose." Booklist also published a starred review, again praising the prose and the various family conflicts throughout the novel. Kirkus Reviews noted the novel's autobiographical elements but wrote that the characters elevated the novel to another level. The New Yorker positively described the novel's depth, noting the significant detail and the unreliability of the novel's narrators. The Los Angeles Times was also positive, praising Messud for incorporating real-world history without losing focus on the family's story. The Star Tribune praised the novel's pacing, as did The Wall Street Journal.

Lily Meyer, writing in The Nation, positively compared the book to those published in the Golden Age of Russian Literature. Meyer simultaneously praised Messud's scope and the depth of the characters, noting that the family secrets revealed in the novel function as "a metaphor for colonial legacy." Laura Miller, writing for Slate, directed praise at the novel's political commentary for taking place in the background and described the novel's impact as coming from the characters, not the commentary. The Associated Press noted that the novel's greater message unfolded over the course of generations within the book, while The Boston Globe positively compared Messud to Leo Tolstoy and Marcel Proust.
