= On the Java Ridge =

Novel by Australian author Jock Serong

- Author: Jock Serong
- Language: English
- Genre: Novel
- Publisher: Text Publishing
- Publication date: 31 July 2017
- Publication place: Australia
- Media type: Print
- Pages: 309 pp.
- Awards: 2018 Staunch Book Prize, winner; 2018 Colin Roderick Award, winner
- ISBN: 9781925498394

On the Java Ridge is a 2017 novel by Australian writer Jock Serong.

== Synopsis ==
The novel is set in the days leading up to a fictional 2018 Federal election, and its narrative moves from the point of view of a cabinet minister in Canberra to two phinisi: one, the Java Ridge of the book's title, fitted for luxury surf tourism, the other an Indonesian fishing boat carrying asylum seekers.

== Critical reception ==
Writing in The Sydney Morning Herald Adrian McKinty noted: "At times On the Java Ridge courts the didacticism of late period John le Carre when really Serong needs to channel someone such as Clive Cussler or Iain Banks to move the plot along. But this is only a minor quibble – how it all gets resolved in the third act is nicely done and I enjoyed jumping between the very different points of view that Serong uses to tell his taut and impressive third novel."

In The Australian Book Review Miriam Cosic found Serong's writing to be "compelling, despite some quirks". She continued: "But as we know from real life, this generation of conservative Australian politicians, who uncharacteristically wear their religion on their sleeves, haven't given Serong much in the way of political or moral argument to work with."

== Awards ==
- 2018 Staunch Book Prize, winner
- 2018 Colin Roderick Award, winner
- 2018 Indie Book Awards Book of the Year – Fiction, shortlisted
