= Rita Bullwinkel =

American author

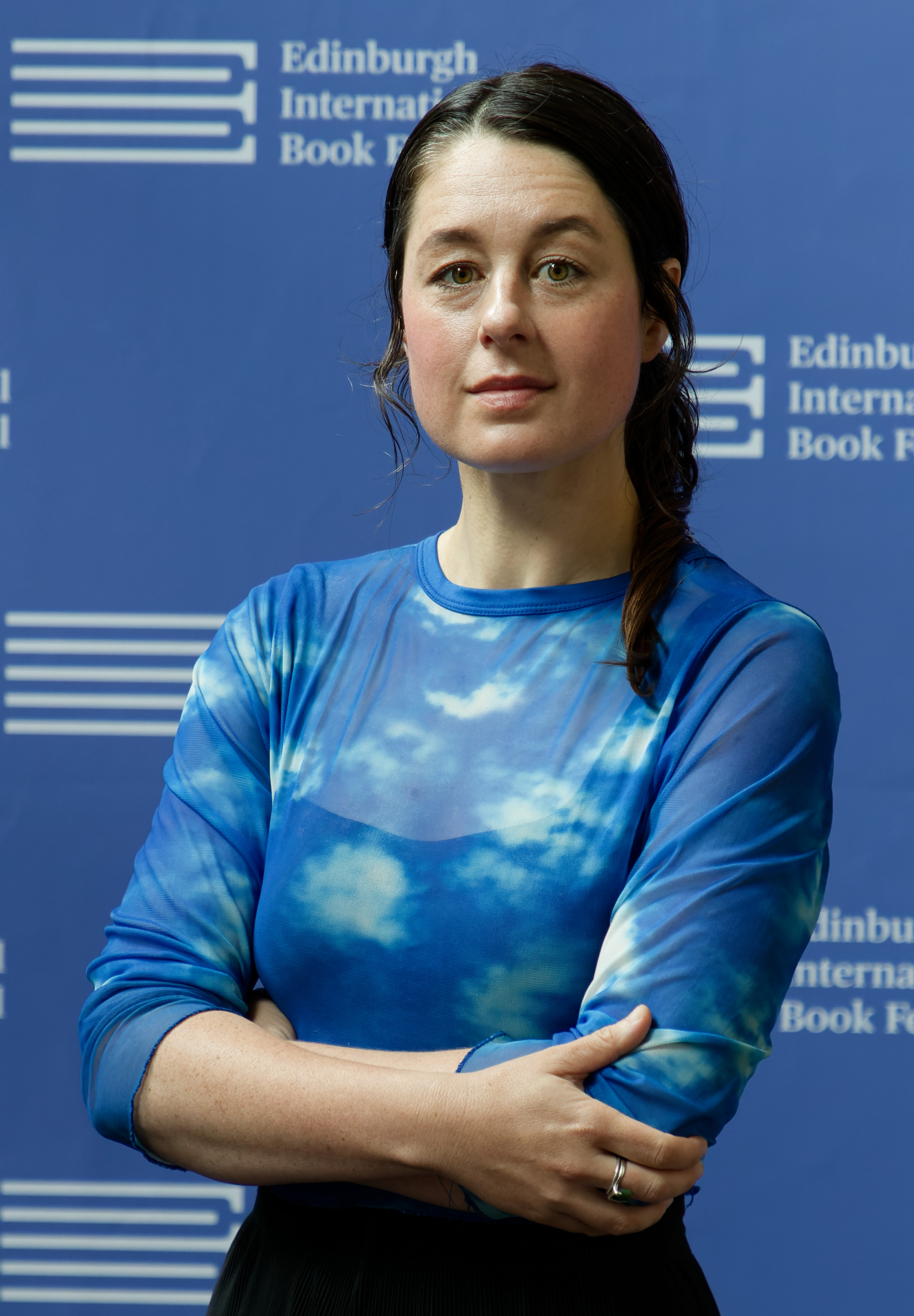
Bullwinkel at the 2024 Edinburgh International Book Festival

Rita Bullwinkel is an American author who is known for her 2024 debut novel Headshot, which was longlisted for the 2024 Booker Prize and was a finalist for the Pulitzer Prize for Fiction. She is also the author of the 2018 collection of short stories Belly Up, which was awarded a Whiting Award in 2022.

Bullwinkel is a professor at the University of San Francisco, where she teaches creative writing. Her other works have appeared in literary journals including The White Review, BOMB, NOON, and Guernica. In 2024, Bullwinkel became the editor of the literary magazine McSweeney's Quarterly after having served an editor at large since 2016.

== Career ==
Bullwinkel's 2024 novel Headshot follows the lives of eight young female boxers as they converge on Reno, Nevada for a two-day boxing tournament in July. The boxing tournament, held at Bob's Boxing Palace (a dilapidated warehouse), hosts the Daughters of America Cup, which consists of single elimination boxing matches between under 18 female boxers. Each chapter of the book is devoted to a boxing match in the tournament, with the chapters describing the matches as well as exploring each athlete's history and background. Other parts of the narrative move into the future and detail the women's future lives. Writing for The New York Times, Dwight Garner stated that the novel's introspective approach to the narrative, focusing on the women's motivations, inner thoughts, past and future lives and ambitions rather than the outcomes of the matches provided for a rapturous experience. Garner stated: "The drama is intense but interior. We are inside a torrid mille-feuille of perception."

Writing for The Observer, John Self stated that the novel "succeeds on its own idiosyncratic terms and leaves the reader's head ringing." Self felt that the character development and exposition were the strongest features of the work, concluding that: "Bullwinkel manages to make each girl spark distinctively on the page." Writing for The Guardian, Benjamin Myers stated that the novel showcased the grittiness and violence of the boxing matches in lyrical detail while also exploring the inner struggles of the women as they navigate society. In a starred review, Kirkus Reviews said the narrative "unfurls in unusually lyric and muscular language."

In 2025, Headshot was shortlisted for the Gordon Burn Prize and longlisted for the International Dublin Literary Award.
