= In the Country of Men =

2006 novel by Hisham Matar

- First edition
- Author: Hisham Matar
- Language: English
- Publisher: Viking Press
- Publication date: 6 July 2006
- Publication place: United Kingdom
- Media type: Print (Hardback & Paperback)
- Pages: 256 pp
- ISBN: 978-0-670-91639-9
- OCLC: 65468307

In the Country of Men is the debut novel of the writer Hisham Matar, first published in July 2006 by Viking, an imprint of Penguin Books. It was nominated for the 2006 Man Booker Prize and the Guardian First Book Award. It has so far been translated into 22 languages and was awarded the 2007 Royal Society of Literature Ondaatje Prize as well as a host of international literary prizes. The book was also nominated for the 2007 National Book Critics Circle Award in the U.S and won the Arab American Book Award in 2007.

== Plot summary ==
The book follows the plight of Suleiman, a nine-year-old boy living in Tripoli in Libya, stuck between a father whose clandestine anti-Qaddafi activities bring about searches, stalkings, and telephone eavesdroppings by Qaddafi's state police, and a vulnerable young mother who resorts to alcohol to bury her anxiety and anger. The only people he has to turn to are his neighbor Kareem and his father's best friend Moosa. The book describes Libya under Qaddafi's terror regime, portraying ordinary people's lives as they try to survive political oppression.

Suleiman grows up partially wealthy because his father, Faraj, is involved in the exotic trade business. Since Faraj's job involves traveling overseas for long periods, Suleiman is primarily reared by his mother, Najwa. As a youth, Najwa was oppressed by her family, and she desired her independence through education instead of being forced into marriage at 14. She made a plan to swallow multiple birth control pills to deter a future husband. However, she miraculously still got pregnant with Suleiman and was forced to abandon her dream of education and raise him. She disparages the stories in One Thousand and One Nights, claiming that Scheherazade still had to ask permission from Shahryar to tell them, and that Scheherazade was a coward for favoring oppression over death—ironically. Her cynical view of the world instills a sense of confusion and a weary eye toward authority in Suleiman.

Ustath Rashid, a university professor, moves next door to Suleiman's family and they become friends. Rashid and his son, Kareem, take Suleiman on a trip to Leptis Magna to engage with the history of Libya. Two days after the trip, Ustath Rashid is kidnapped by members of Qaddafi's Revolutionary Committee. Suleiman watches Kareem stand perplexed as his father became rumored to be a "traitor". A week later, Suleiman sees his father being followed by his office clerk, Nasser, at the Martyr's Square and suspects him of being involved in something other than exotic trade. His suspicions prove true as the Revolutionary Committee comes to his home and interrogates the family. Najwa and Moosa—Faraj's best friend and the son of a wealthy lawyer from Egypt—hang a picture of Qaddafi in their living room. They burn all of Faraj's books and letters except one that Suleiman saved. The book which he later hid under his bed was Democracy Now, a gift from Ustath Rashid.

Within the political, social, and familial confusion, Suleiman is forced to define his independence and grows up awkwardly. He fights with Kareem as they play a game of "Your Land, My Land" because he called his father a traitor; he envies Adnan because he feels his chronic illness gives a person independence; and after offering the village beggar, Bahloul, food, he gets into a fight with him. His mother's psychology deteriorates throughout the narrative and she becomes more reliant on alcohol, but after she reveals to Suleiman a history of familial abuse, he imagines his mother happy and realizes that the ability to imagine her happiness means happiness is still attainable which makes him often fantasize of saving her.

However, she never drank alcohol when her husband was home, so Suleiman assumed she got "sick".

After making an allegiance with their neighbor, Abu Jafer, Suleiman and his family watch a national broadcast to show the strength of Qaddafi's revolution. To deliver a symbolic message, the government hangs Ustath Rashid in a public execution after his public interrogation, demonstrating that no one is capable of standing against the revolution. Faraj returns after the hanging and is badly beaten, and Suleiman fears for his father. In a moment of irony, Suleiman finds himself longing for the connection the family had while watching the hanging of Ustath Rashid.

Suleiman is eventually forced to leave Tripoli and travel to Cairo. He objects to the decision but is nonetheless sent. After fifteen years in Cairo, Suleiman grows up to be a pharmacist, believing that he did so because of his mother's addiction to her "medications". After his father's death, Najwa decides to travel to Cairo to see her son. Once they reunite, she adores him as if they were never separated, and he realizes that despite all the political confusion and madness, they were still able to live.

== Characters ==
- Suleiman el Dewani - the nine-year-old narrator
- Faraj el Dewani "Baba" - Suleiman's father
- Najwa "Mama" - Suleiman's mother
- Moosa - Baba's best friend
- Nasser - Baba's office clerk
- Kareem - Suleiman's next-door neighbor and best friend
- Ustath Rashid - Kareem's father and a co-conspirator of Baba; he has already been arrested when the book's narrative begins
- Sharief - a member of the Revolutionary Committee hunting Faraj el Dewani
- Abu Jafer - Suleiman's neighbor who is a part of the Revolutionary Committee
- Adnan - Suleiman's neighbor who is around the same age, but much wiser due to his chronic illness—which is never named
