= Yael van der Wouden =

Dutch writer (born 1987)

Yael van der Wouden (born 1987) is a Dutch writer. Her first novel, The Safekeep, was shortlisted for the 2024 Booker Prize, and won the 2025 Women's Prize for Fiction.

== Early life and education ==
Yael van der Wouden was born in 1987 in Tel Aviv, Israel, to an Israeli mother and a Dutch father. When she was 10, the family moved to the Netherlands. She started ballet classes at the age of three, and competed in her school's talent show aged ten, with a dance interpreting a flame. At age 13, van der Wouden learned she is intersex; in her acceptance speech for the Women's Prize for Fiction (June 2025), she said: "the long and the short of it is that hormonally I am intersex."

Van der Wouden studied comparative literature at Utrecht University and SUNY Binghamton. She has described herself as a "Dutch-Israeli mixed-bag-diaspora child", and is queer.

== Writing career ==
Van der Wouden's essay "On (Not) Reading Anne Frank" was published in The Best American Essays in 2018, and received a "notable mention". It "explored the ways in which that totemic, sentimentalised figure threatened to leave little space for [Van der Wouden's] own explorations of her Dutch-Jewish identity".

Her first novel, The Safekeep (2024) was the subject of bidding wars between nine publishers for the United Kingdom edition and ten for the United States. It is the story of Isabel, who lives in her late parents' house 15 years after the end of World War II, and her brother's partner Eva who comes to stay for the summer: "What happens between the two women leads to a revelation which threatens to unravel all she has ever known." The Observer's reviewer says that the author "weaves this story of historical reckoning (or its avoidance) with an account of Isabel's individual and sexual awakening," The Guardian's reviewer called it "An impressive debut" and said "The book's powerful final act provides an already weighty emotional situation with an extra layer of historical heft", and The New York Times's reviewer described it as "An Erotic Story of Love and Obsession in 1960s Amsterdam". In a starred review, Kirkus Reviews called the novel, "A brilliant debut, as multifaceted as a gem."

== Other activities ==
Van der Wouden has taught creative writing, storytelling, and literature.

== Awards and nominations ==
The Safekeep was shortlisted for the 2024 Booker Prize. It was the first shortlisted title by a Dutch author and the only debut novel on the 2024 shortlist.

Year	Award	Category	Result	Reference
2024	Booker Prize	—	Shortlisted	
2025	Aspen Words Literary Prize	—	Pending^{Shortlist}	
2025	Dylan Thomas Prize	—	Pending^{Shortlist}	
2025	Sophie Brody Award	—	Shortlisted	
2025	Walter Scott Prize	—	Pending^{Shortlist}	
2025	Wingate Literary Prize	—	Longlisted	
2025	Women's Prize for Fiction	—	Won	

== Selected Writings ==
- van der Wouden, Yael (December 2017). "On (Not) Reading Anne Frank". The Sun Magazine.
- van der Wouden, Yael (2024). The Safekeep (hardcover 1st ed.). London: Viking Press. ISBN 9780241652305.
