= Claire Messud =

American novelist and academic (born 1966)

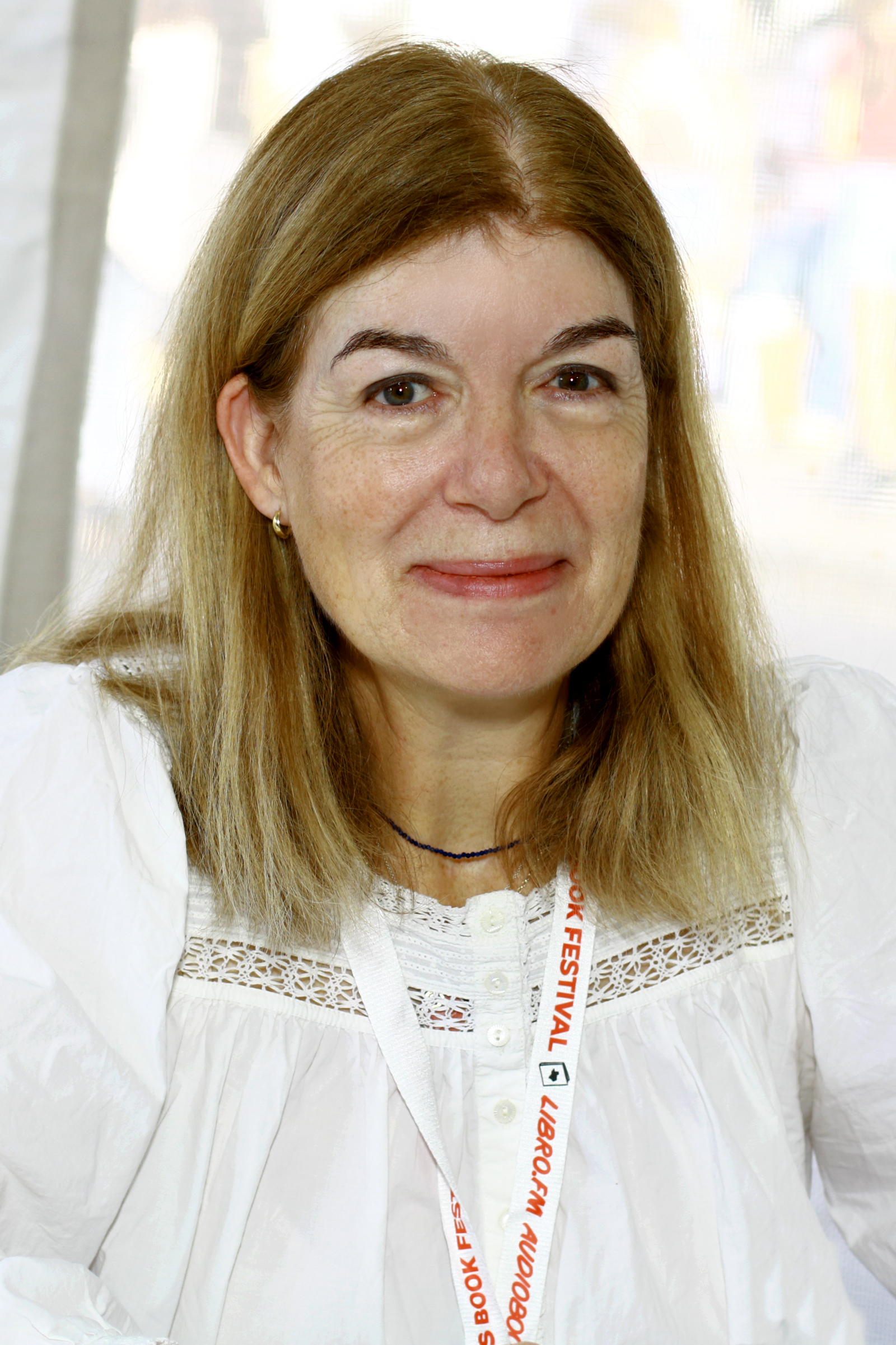
- Messud at the 2024 Texas Book Festival
- Born: October 8, 1966 (age 59); Greenwich, Connecticut, U.S.
- Occupations: Novelist, teacher
- Spouse: James Wood
- Website: www.clairemessud.com

Claire Messud (born October 8, 1966) is an American novelist and literature and creative writing professor. She is best known as the author of the novel The Emperor's Children (2006).

== Early life ==
Born in Greenwich, Connecticut, Messud grew up in Australia and Canada, spending two years in boarding school in the United States as a teenager. Messud's mother is Canadian, and her father is a Pied-noir from French Algeria. She was educated at the University of Toronto Schools and Milton Academy. She did undergraduate and graduate studies at Yale University and Cambridge University, where she met her husband James Wood.

In 1989, after her two years at Cambridge ended, Messud entered the M.F.A. program at Syracuse University. However, she soon felt that that endeavor was not a good fit for her aspirations, as all the other students, in addition to being older, and "already married and sometimes getting divorced", were heavily interested in American authors whose work she was not yet familiar with, such as Charles Baxter, Leonard Michaels, and Ann Beattie. Messud's literary tastes were more towards the experimental women authors with whom her mother had raised her, such as Katherine Mansfield, Djuna Barnes, Elizabeth Bowen, and Jean Rhys.

== Career ==
Messud's debut novel, When The World Was Steady (1995), was nominated for the PEN/Faulkner Award. In 1999, she published her second book, The Last Life, about three generations of a French-Algerian family. Her 2001 work, The Hunters, consists of two novellas. The Emperor's Children, which Messud wrote while a fellow at the Radcliffe Institute for Advanced Study in 2004–2005, was critically praised and became a New York Times bestseller, as well as being longlisted for the 2006 Man Booker Prize. In April 2013, Messud published her sixth novel, The Woman Upstairs. Her 2017 novel, The Burning Girl, was named one of the best books of the year by the Los Angeles Times.

Messud has taught creative writing at Amherst College, Kenyon College, University of Maryland, Yale University, in the Warren Wilson College MFA Program for Writers in North Carolina, and in the Graduate Writing program at Johns Hopkins University. Messud also taught at Sewanee: The University of the South in Sewanee, Tennessee. She is on the editorial board of the literary magazine The Common, based at Amherst College. She has contributed articles to publications such as The New York Review of Books.

In 2009, Messud began teaching a literary traditions course each spring semester as a part of CUNY Hunter College's MFA Program in Creative Writing. She subsequently taught creative writing at other schools, including the University of Maryland and Johns Hopkins University.

Since 2015, Messud has been a senior lecturer of the English Department at Harvard University, where she is part of the Creative Writing faculty.

== Personal life ==
Messud has two children.

== Awards ==
The American Academy of Arts and Letters has recognized Messud's talent with both an Addison Metcalf Award and a Strauss Living Award. She was considered for the 2003 Granta Best of Young British Novelists list, although none of the three passports she holds is British. As of 2010–2011, she is a fellow at the Wissenschaftskolleg zu Berlin / Institute of Advanced Study.

This Strange Eventful History was longlisted for the 2024 Giller Prize. It was also longlisted for the 2024 Booker Prize.

== Bibliography ==
=== Books ===
- When the World Was Steady. Knopf Doubleday Publishing Group. 1995. ISBN 978-0-393-35509-3.
- The Last Life: A Novel. Houghton Mifflin Harcourt. 1999. ISBN 978-0-547-56385-5.
- The Hunters. Houghton Mifflin Harcourt. 2001. pp. 200–. ISBN 978-0-547-56387-9.
- The Professor's History, Picador, 2006, ISBN 9780330445771
- The Emperor's Children. Knopf Doubleday Publishing Group. 29 August 2006. ISBN 978-0-307-26601-9.
- The Woman Upstairs. Knopf Canada. 30 April 2013. ISBN 978-0-307-40118-2.(longlisted for the 2013 Scotiabank Giller Prize)
- The Burning Girl. W. W. Norton & Company. 2017. ISBN 978-0-393-63502-7.
- Kant's Little Prussian Head and Other Reasons Why I Write. An Autobiography in Essays. W. W. Norton & Company. 2020. ISBN 978-1324006756.
- A Dream Life. Tablo Tales. 2022. ISBN 978-1-649-69729-5.
- This Strange Eventful History. W.W. Norton. 2024. ISBN 978-0-393-63504-1. (longlisted for the 2024 Booker Prize)
