= Wandering Stars (Orange novel) =

2024 novel by Tommy Orange

- Author: Tommy Orange
- Language: English
- Genre: Historical fiction, contemporary fiction
- Publisher: Knopf
- Publication date: 27 February 2024
- Publication place: United States
- Pages: 336
- ISBN: 9780593311448

Wandering Stars is a novel by American author Tommy Orange, published by 2024. Wandering Stars is a multigenerational novel that traces a Native American family's lineage from the 1864 Sand Creek Massacre to present-day Oakland.

It is also a companion novel to Orange's 2018 novel There There, to which it serves as both prequel and sequel, but is a standalone book.

== Synopsis ==
In 1864, a young Cheyenne man named Bird survives the Sand Creek Massacre only to be imprisoned at Fort Marion, where he is forced to abandon his language and culture by Richard Henry Pratt, an evangelical guard who later founds the Carlisle Indian Industrial School. The novel traces the consequences of Bird's survival of the massacre and time at the school across generations, returning to scenes in There There.

== Reception ==
Wandering Stars won the 2025 Aspen Words Literary Prize, judged "to deepen and inform Orange’s fine debut novel There, There, but it also stands on its own as a mesmerizing epic drama." It was longlisted for the Booker Prize in 2024.

In a review for The New York Times, Jonathan Escoffery said, "Orange’s ability to highlight the contradictory forces that coexist within friendships, familial relationships and the characters themselves, who contend with holding private and public identities, makes Wandering Stars a towering achievement."

The Guardian reviewed the book positively, discussing the book's exploration of inherited trauma, concluding: "Hyperbole be damned: Orange’s work feels, to me, as vital as air." NPR discussed the book's language: "Wandering Stars is a somewhat manic polyphonic construction that deploys first, second, and third person narration...Orange has a predilection for repeating words that concern endurance and survival, which results in incantatory phrases that loop and curl in on themselves, as does his narrative," concluding that "Wandering Stars more than fulfills the promise of There There."

The Chicago Review of Books wrote, "Ultimately, Wandering Stars is less about reconnecting with what has been lost than asking questions of how to define what lies ahead. Each voice is a dream that transcends mere visions of the past to transform the voices of the living."

On the other hand, The Wall Street Journal's review was negative, writing: "Mr. Orange’s strengths are his sincerity and conviction, but Wandering Stars is more persuasive as a diagnosis than a developed work of fiction."

The writer Roxane Gay said, "Wandering Stars is sprawling and polyphonic and original...[There's] a lot to admire here."
