= Staunch Book Prize =

The Staunch Book Prize is an award given to thriller novels that avoid featuring violence to women. British writer and screenwriter Bridget Lawless founded the prize in 2018. Some writers object to the premise of the award, referring to it as a "gag order" and accusing it of censorship.

== Background ==
But we are concerned about the way that women are depicted as the victims of extreme torture, rape and murder, graphically described, bloody, terrifying and prolonged, normalised and offered up as entertainment. And guess what, so are lots of people, including readers who reject it by preference, and those working to end violence towards women.

— Bridget Lawless

Lawless established the prize in 2018 after she noticed the number of films that used rape as a plot device in the 2017 British Academy of Film and Television Arts (BAFTA) award nominees, and was inspired by the Time's Up and Me Too movements, to encourage alternatives to violence-against-women tropes.

The official website describes the criteria as "a novel in the thriller genre in which no woman is beaten, stalked, sexually exploited, raped or murdered." The Staunch Book Prize is open to traditionally published, self-published and not-yet-published works and awards £2,000 (funded by Lawless). The entry fee is £20.

The annual winner is announced on November 25, which is the International Day for the Elimination of Violence against Women. The original novel prize was suspended for 2021 and was projected to return in 2022. In 2022, the Staunch Book Prize closed.

== Controversy ==
Several writers criticized the Staunch Book Prize. Crime writer Sarah Hilary equated the prize criteria with silencing the voices of domestic violence victims, and called it "not a prize so much as a gagging order". Domestic noir writer Julia Crouch said "what that kind of prize immediately knocks out is the lived experience of millions of women in this country".

In World Literature Today, writer Janet Clark counters the criticism by saying "the prize is one way of drawing attention toward an undeniable trend of using horrific and perverse brutality as cheap plot devices. And it works: people talk about it." Hallie Rubenhold, writing in The Guardian, calls the prize "noble in sentiment", while acknowledging Val McDermid's argument that "acts of misogyny and violence against women are being committed, they need to be written about, and not swept under the carpet."

The first winner of the prize, Jock Serong, says the prize addresses "that laziness that creeps in, the tropes where women and girls are used unthinkingly as default victims in the story." Slate notes that the debate over the prize accomplishes the prize's purpose of drawing attention to the use of violence against women in fiction.

== Winners ==
- 2018: Jock Serong for On the Java Ridge
- 2019: Samantha Harvey for The Western Wind
- 2020: Attica Locke for Heaven, My Home

== Shortlist ==
Year	Author	Work	Result	Ref
2018	Jock Serong	On the Java Ridge	Won	
2018	Peter Adamson	The Kennedy Moment	Shortlisted	
2018	Alison Gaylin	If I Die Tonight	Shortlisted	
2018	Anna Porter	The Appraisal	Shortlisted	
2018	Khurrum Rahman	East of Hounslow	Shortlisted	
2018	Joyce Thompson	Cops & Queens	Shortlisted	
2019	Samantha Harvey	The Western Wind	Won	
2019	Brenda Brooks	Honey: A Novel	Shortlisted	
2019	Hannelore Cayre	The Godmother	Shortlisted	
2019	Lawrence Osborne	Only to Sleep	Shortlisted	
2019	August Thomas	Liar's Candle: A Novel	Shortlisted	
2020	Attica Locke	Heaven, My Home	Won	
2020	Fiona Erskine	The Chemical Reaction	Shortlisted	
2020	Aimee Liu	Glorious Boy	Shortlisted	
2020	Ottessa Moshfegh	Death in Her Hands	Shortlisted	
2020	Jock Serong	The Burning Island	Shortlisted	
2020	Paul Vidich	The Coldest Warrior	Shortlisted	
