= Carry Me Down =

2006 novel by M. J. Hyland

- First edition
- Author: M. J. Hyland
- Language: English
- Publisher: Canongate
- Publication date: 17 Feb 2006
- Publication place: United Kingdom
- Pages: 192
- ISBN: 1-84195-740-2

Carry Me Down (2006) is the second novel of British writer M. J. Hyland. It was awarded the Hawthornden Prize in 2007 and was shortlisted for the Booker Prize.

Carry me down is the story of a young boy who can detect lies. Set in a small village, this extraordinary boy John Egan first realized his powers when his father ruthlessly killed three kittens and lied about not feeling bad. He had warm relations with his kind-hearted mother. They were broken when conditions forced them to move to the growing misery of a big city. Young John thought that if truth was let out things would be back to normal. But the world has changed, and truth is not an easy affair. His dream was to get a place in the Guinness Book of World Records as the first human lie detector. Tragedy strikes when he reveals a life-changing and deep secret of his dad. Little does he know this will lead to a cat and dog fight between his mom and dad. John's mother is disgraced and so is John. But his grandmother sorts things out, and welcomes them as family again. This book ends with his Guinness dream being rejected and his disastrous truth-detecting powers declining. He knows he is going to live a happy and contented life.
