= M. J. Hyland =

English novelist (born 1968)

Maria Joan Hyland
- Born: 1968 (age 57–58); London, England
- Occupations: Novelist, lecturer
- Writing career
- Period: 2000–present

Maria Joan Hyland is an ex-lawyer and the author of three novels: How the Light Gets In (2004), Carry Me Down (2006) and This Is How (2009). Hyland is a lecturer in creative writing at the Manchester Centre for New Writing. Carry Me Down was shortlisted for the Man Booker Prize and won the Hawthornden Prize and the Encore Prize.

Hyland has twice been longlisted for the Orange Prize (2007 and 2010), twice shortlisted for the Commonwealth Writers' Prize (2004 and 2007), and longlisted for the International Dublin Literary Award.

At the University of Manchester she has run fiction workshops alongside Martin Amis (2007–2010), Colm Tóibín (2010–2011) and Jeanette Winterson (2013–present). Hyland runs regular Fiction Masterclasses in the Guardian Masterclass Programme, has twice been shortlisted for the BBC Short Story Prize (2011 and 2012) and she publishes in The Guardian's"How to Write" series, Financial Times, the London Review of Books, Granta and elsewhere.

== Writing ==
All three novels have been longlisted and shortlisted for several prizes including the Orange Prize (2007, 2010) and the Commonwealth Writers' Prize (2004, 2007). Notably, Carry Me Down (2006) was shortlisted for the Man Booker Prize, and it won both the Hawthornden Prize and Encore Prize. Carry Me Down was subsequently listed as one of the Top 100 Australian Novels of All Time by the Society of Authors. This Is How (2009) was longlisted for the International Dublin Literary Award.

Hyland's short story "Even Pretty Eyes Commit Crimes", which was shortlisted for the BBC International Short Story Prize (2012) and first published online by Granta, was story of the week in Narrative Magazine.

Hyland's short stories have been published in many places, including Zoetrope: All-Story (2004, 2005, 2006, 2008), Blackbook Magazine (2004, 2006 & 2007), Best Australian Short Stories (2006 & 2008) and, in September 2011, her short story "Rag Love" was shortlisted for the BBC National Short Story Award. Hyland's "Even Pretty Eyes Commit Crimes" has been published in the anthology Best British Short Stories (2013). Boyd Tonkin from The Independent said of the anthology: "Nicholas Royale has excellent taste, ensuring little explosions of weirdness or transcendence often erupt amid much well-observed everyday life."

== Teaching and editing ==
Hyland runs regular in the Guardian Masterclass Programme, has twice been shortlisted for the BBC Short Story Prize (2011 and 2012) and regularly publishes non-fiction in The Guardian (including in the How to Write series), the Financial Times, the London Review of Books, Lonely Planet, Granta, the Scottish Herald, and elsewhere. Hyland teaches three fiction courses in 2014 in the Curtis Brown (International Literary Agency) programme. Her advice on proof-reading has been cited in The New Scientist.

== Public readings and events ==
Hyland has made more than two dozen appearances on national and international radio, including RTÉ (Ireland), PBS (US), Radio 4 and The BBC World Service, Radio 3, The ABC (Australia) and has been a guest of nine major literary festivals, including the Edinburgh International Festival and Hay-on-Wye.

Hyland has also been appointed writer-in-residence in programmes such as Arizona State University's Workshop Programme (February 2014) and writer-in-residence at Griffith University (August 2013), and has appeared at the Melbourne Writers Festival, Crossing Borders, the Netherlands, Segovia, Rome, the Brisbane Writers' Festival (July/August, 2013).

== Personal life ==
In 2008, Hyland was diagnosed with multiple sclerosis, a debilitating neurological disease.

== Awards ==
How the Light Gets In (2004)

- Shortlisted The Age Book of the Year Award, Fiction (2004)
- Shortlisted for the Commonwealth Writers' Prize (2004? 2005?)
- Longlisted Waverton Good Read Award (2004)
- Winner Best Young Novelist, The Sydney Morning Herald
- 3rd Prize, Barnes & Noble Discover Great Young Novelists

Carry Me Down (2006)

- Shortlisted for the Man Booker Prize* Winner of the Hawthornden Prize (2007) * Winner of the Encore Prize (2007) * Shortlisted for the Commonwealth Writers' Prize (2006) (2006)
- Shortlisted for the Commonwealth Writers' Prize (2007)
- Winner of the Encore Prize (2007)
- Winner of the Hawthornden Prize (2007)
- Longlisted for the Orange Prize (2007)

This Is How (2009)

- Longlisted for the International Dublin Literary Award (2009)
- Longlisted for the Orange Prize (2010)

Short fiction:

- Nominated for the Pushcart Prize (2008)
- "Rag Love" shortlisted for the BBC Short Story Prize (2011)
- "Even Pretty Eyes Commit Crimes" shortlisted for the BBC International Short Story Prize (2012).
- "Other People's Beds" was longlisted for the EFG £30,000 Sunday Times Short Story Award (2014)

Essays

- "Hardy Animal" shortlisted for the inaugural William Hazlitt Essay Prize 2013

== Reviews ==
=== How the Light Gets In ===
- "Hyland is a talented writer grappling with serious questions about how we make our way through the world. . . .' New York Times
- "A story with grit and heart from an intelligent, perspicacious writer to watch." Kirkus Reviews
- "That Hyland is a talented writer is clear from the novel’s first page." Australian Book Review
- "Hyland is an intelligent writing grappling with serious questions about how we make our way through the world." The New York Times
- "Heartbreaking and compelling." The Observer
- "Expect to be blown away." The Guardian
- "A dry and fantastically sarcastic voice..." Time Out, New York
- "Spot on." Irish Examiner
- "a disturbing work which simmers with edgy brilliance." Sunday Herald
- "The best book I read this year..." Mark Cousins, Scotland on Sunday

=== Carry Me Down (2006) ===
- "Hyland can do humour, horror and pathos all at once..." The Spectator
- "This is writing of the highest order..." JM Coetzee
- "[Hyland] brings life's uncomprehended complexities horribly alive." The Times

=== This Is How (2009) ===
- "Unflinching, absorbing, morally complex ... an eerie, commanding book ... a novel about crime but not a crime novel ... thrilling, moving and compassionate." The New York Times
- "Bleak yet moving, mercilessly dispassionate yet shot through with kindness and wit, it is a profound achievement" Justine Jordan
- "A novel of extraordinary power ... Hyland tells her story in a supercharged present tense, tremblingly aware of physical detail." The Guardian
- "This is an expertly paced, gripping novel that doesn't falter and never compromises its emotional truth." The Times
- "A tour de force. Hyland illuminates this man's damaged soul with such a steely, brilliant clarity that your heart breaks for him." Helen Garner
- "When you've been reading Hyland, other writers seem to lack integrity ... whereas she aims straight for the truth and the heart." Hilary Mantel
- "Three or four days [after finishing the novel], Hyland's white-hot prose was still smouldering in my head." Financial Times
- "She makes it look so simple, with her words of one syllable, with a style almost entirely devoid of affect; but there is nothing simplistic about her achievement." New York Times
- "The narrative drive is relentless, surging on and on in the toneless voice of Patrick Oxtoby, Hyland’s protagonist." Philip Womack

=== Teaching and editing ===
- "The course carries on and, just as I'm starting to get bored by the group discussion, Curtis Brown Creative pulls what is a stroke of genius in the form of four sessions with MJ Hyland. OMFG. I read the first chapter of her book Carry Me Down. Wow, she can write – even if she is writing about teaching a child to drown puppies. I should have worked out what was coming. She is lively, clever and shit-scary in a way that few men are. She is intimidating yet attentive. Comparing her to our tutor is like comparing Guns N' Roses to Otis Redding." Collette Brown.

== Works ==
=== Novels ===
- How the Light Gets In, Canongate, 2004. ISBN 9781841955483.
- Carry Me Down, 2006, ISBN 9781841957401 (hardcover)
- This Is How, 2009, ISBN 9780802170620.

=== Short work ===
- Even Pretty Eyes Commit Crimes – Published by Granta in 2012. Shortlisted for the International BBC Short Story Prize (2012), also Published in Narrative Magazine and Comma Press
- Rag Love – originally published in January 2011 as First-Class Passage. Also published in Australia's major review/politics/ arts & media magazine, The Monthly. Available as a BBC radio broadcast. ISBN 9781445816425
- M. J. Hyland's Short Stories published in Zoetrope: All-Story:
  - A Boy, an Ex-Orphanage, and a Trapped Dog, Vol. 10, No. 3:
  - Eggshell Skull, Vol. 12, No. 1
