= Samantha Harvey =

English novelist (born 1975)

Samantha Harvey FRSL
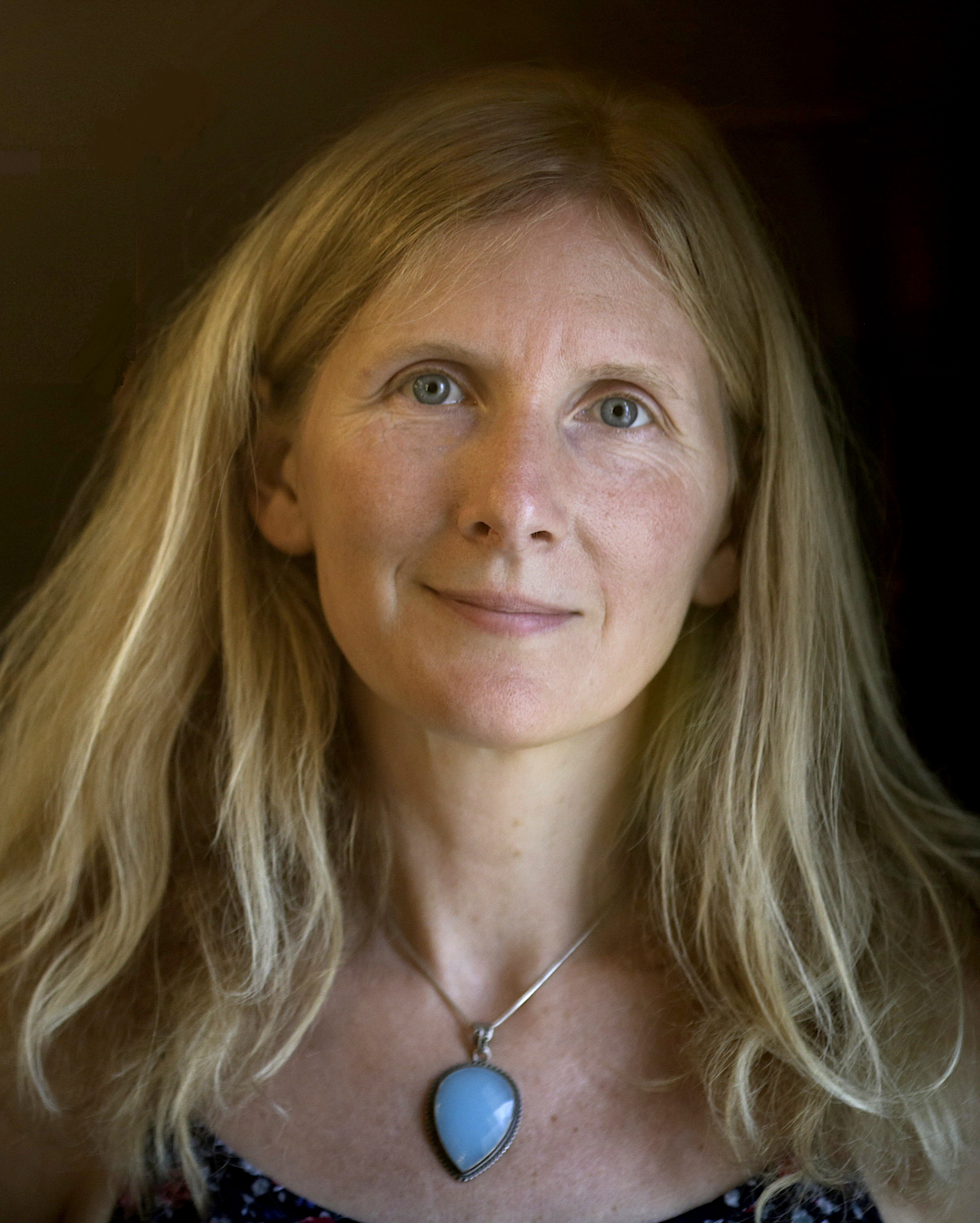
- Harvey in 2019
- Born: 1975 (age 50–51); Kent, England
- Education: Bath Spa University
- Occupation: Novelist
- Writing career
- Years active: 2008–present
- Genre: Literary fiction
- Notable works: The Wilderness (2009); Orbital (2023)
- Notable awards: Betty Trask Prize (2009); Booker Prize (2024)
- Website: www.samanthaharvey.co.uk

Samantha Harvey (born 1975) is an English novelist. She won the 2024 Booker Prize for her novel Orbital, which drew on conventions from multiple genres and fields, including literary fiction, science fiction, and philosophy.

== Early life and education ==
Harvey spent the first decade of her life in Ditton, Kent, near Maidstone, until her parents' divorce. After that, her mother moved to Ireland, and Harvey spent her teenage years moving around with stints in York, Sheffield, and Japan. Harvey studied philosophy at the University of York and the University of Sheffield. She completed the Bath Spa University Creative Writing MA course in 2005, and has also completed a PhD in creative writing.

== Career ==
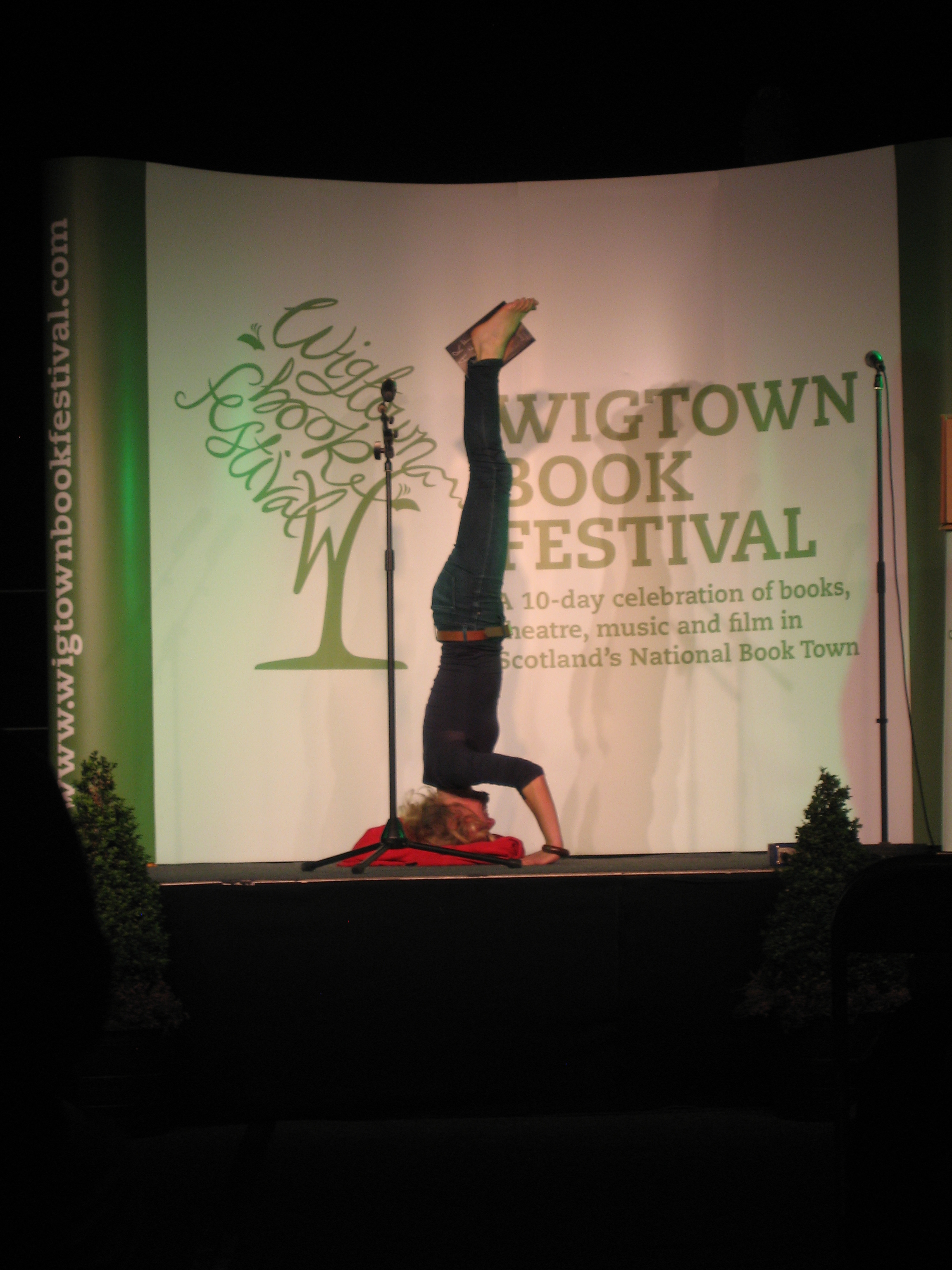
Harvey performing a headstand on stage at the 2014 Wigtown Book Festival

Harvey's first novel, The Wilderness (2009), is written from the point of view of a man developing Alzheimer's disease, and describes through increasingly fractured prose the unravelling effect of the disease. Her second novel, All Is Song (2012), is about moral and filial duty, and about the choice between questioning and conforming. The author has described the novel as a loose, modern day reimagining of the life of Socrates.

Her third novel, Dear Thief, is a long letter from a woman to her absent friend, detailing the emotional fallout of a love triangle. The novel is said to be based on the Leonard Cohen song "Famous Blue Raincoat". Dear Thief was published in 2014 by Jonathan Cape. Harvey's fourth novel, The Western Wind, about a priest in fifteenth-century Somerset, was published in March 2018.

The Shapeless Unease, her only work of non-fiction, is an account of her experience of severe insomnia. Her 2023 novel, Orbital, won the 2024 Booker Prize. It takes place on a space station over one day of low earth orbits, and was described by Mark Haddon as "one of the most beautiful novels I have read in a very long time".

Her short stories have appeared in Granta and on BBC Radio 4. She reviews for The Guardian and The New York Times, and has contributed essays and articles to The New Yorker, The Telegraph, The Guardian, and Time. Her radio appearances include on Radio 4's Front Row, Open Book, A Good Read and Start the Week, and Radio 3's Free Thinking.

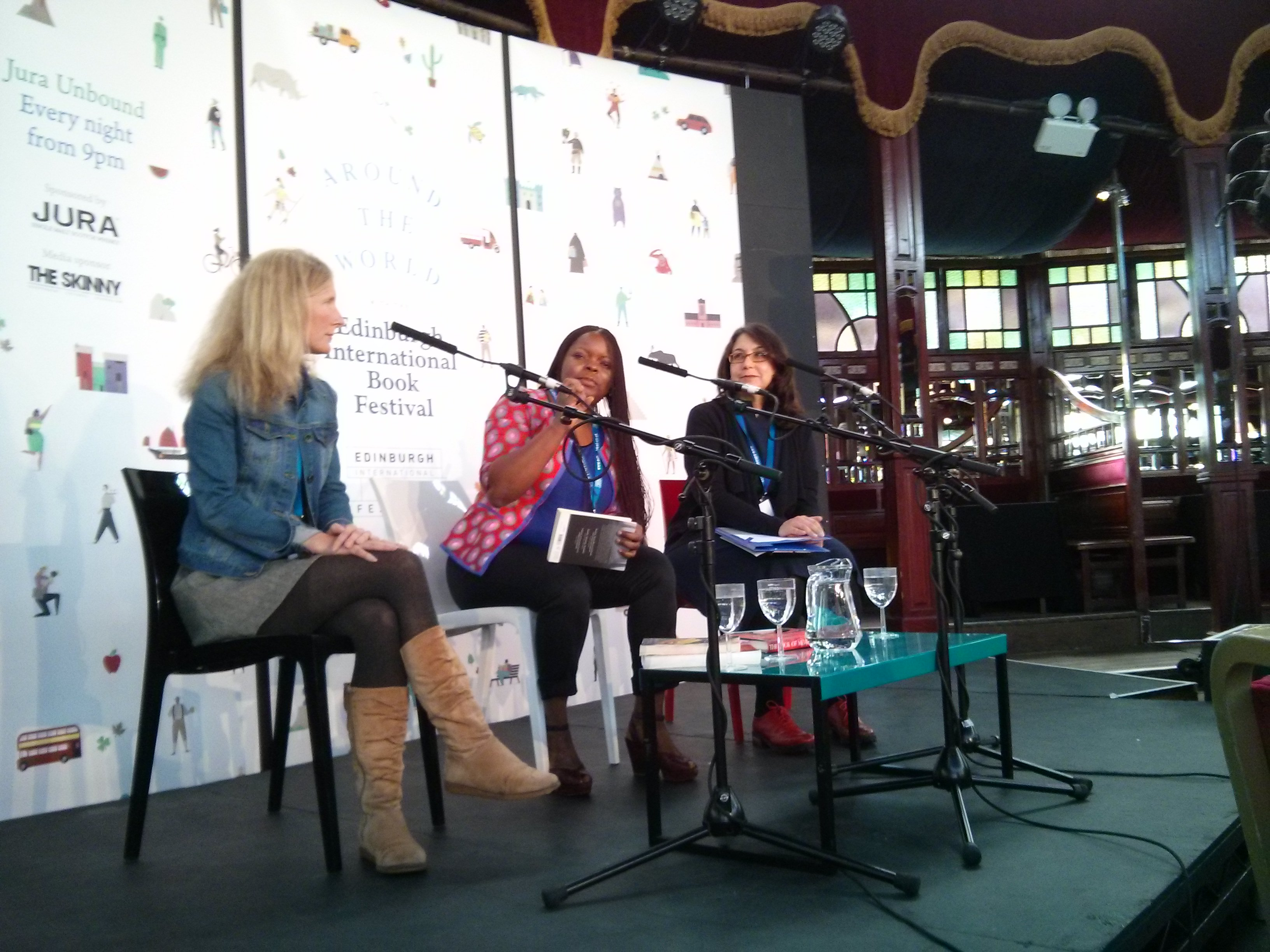
On stage with Petina Gappah and Lee Randall at the 2015 Edinburgh International Book Festival

Harvey's novels have been considered for many prizes, including the Man Booker Prize, the Baileys Women's Prize for Fiction, the James Tait Black Memorial Prize, the Walter Scott Prize, and the Orange Prize. In 2010, she was named one of the 12 best new British novelists by The Culture Show. In 2019, The Western Wind won the Staunch Book Prize.

Harvey is published in the UK by Jonathan Cape and in the US by Grove Atlantic. She is represented by the literary agent Anna Webber.

Harvey is a Reader on the MA in creative writing at Bath Spa University and a member of the academy for the Rathbones Folio Prize, and is as of 2023 acting as a mentor for the Rathbones Folio Mentorships. She was a member of the jury for the 2016 Scotiabank Giller Prize, and has held writing fellowships at MacDowell in the US, Hawthornden in Scotland, and the Santa Maddalena Foundation in Italy.

She teaches regularly for Arvon Foundation, and runs writing courses annually in Spain with the author Emma Hooper.

Harvey was elected a Fellow of the Royal Society of Literature (FRSL) in 2025.

=== Nominations and prizes ===
Year	Title	Award	Category	Result	Ref.
2009	The Wilderness	AMI Literature AwardThe Times of India	—	Won	
2009	The Wilderness	Betty Trask Prize and Awards	Betty Trask Prize	Won	
2009	The Wilderness	Guardian First Book Award	—	Shortlisted	
2009	The Wilderness	Man Booker Prize	—	Longlisted	
2009	The Wilderness	Orange Prize for Fiction	—	Shortlisted	
2015	Dear Thief	Baileys Women's Prize for Fiction	—	Longlisted	
2015	Dear Thief	James Tait Black Memorial Prize	Fiction	Shortlisted	
2015	Dear Thief	Jerwood Fiction Uncovered Prize	—	Longlisted	
2018	The Western Wind	HWA Crown Award	Gold Crown	Longlisted	
2019	The Western Wind	Staunch Book Prize	—	Won	
2019	The Western Wind	Walter Scott Prize	—	Shortlisted	
2020	The Western Wind	International Dublin Literary Award	—	Longlisted	
2024	Orbital	Booker Prize	—	Won	
2024	Orbital	Hawthornden Prize	—	Won	
2024	Orbital	The InWords Literary Award	—	Won	
2024	Orbital	Orwell Prize	Political Fiction	Shortlisted	
2024	Orbital	Ursula K. Le Guin Prize	—	Shortlisted	

== Bibliography ==
=== Novels ===
- —— (2009). The Wilderness. Jonathan Cape. ISBN 9780224086073.
- —— (2012). All Is Song. Jonathan Cape. ISBN 9780224096324.
- —— (2014). Dear Thief. Jonathan Cape. ISBN 9780224101721.
- —— (2018). The Western Wind. Jonathan Cape. ISBN 9781787330597.
- —— (2023). Orbital. Jonathan Cape. ISBN 9781787334342.

=== Non-fiction ===
- —— (2020). The Shapeless Unease: A Year of Not Sleeping. Jonathan Cape. ISBN 9781787332027.

== Translations ==
Harvey's novels have been translated into Chinese, Dutch, French, German, Greek, Italian, Spanish, Hebrew, Norwegian, Portuguese and Romanian.
