= The Emperor's Children =

2006 novel by Claire Messud

- Author: Claire Messud
- Language: English
- Published: 2006 (Knopf)
- Publication place: United States
- Media type: Print (hardback)

The Emperor's Children is a 2006 novel by the American author Claire Messud. It is the author's third novel and her first best-seller. It was longlisted for the 2006 Man Booker Prize.

The novel focuses on the stories of three friends in their early thirties living in Manhattan in the months leading up to the attacks on the World Trade Center on September 11, 2001. Each of the three is well-educated and privileged, but each struggles with realizing the lofty expectations for individual personal and professional lives.

== Plot ==
In 2001 in New York City three friends, who all showed signs of brilliance in their youth, reach their 30s without having achieved the promise they showed a decade earlier. Danielle Minkoff is the only one of her friends to hold a steady job, working as a producer for a TV program that makes documentaries. Marina Thwaite is the daughter of a revered literary critic and author Murray Thwaite and his wife Annabel. Years earlier, Marina secured a contract to write a book about children's fashion, and having used up all her advance money and facing a hard deadline, moves back into her childhood home with her parents. Meanwhile, Julius Clarke, a brilliant and witty critic for The Village Voice, cannot sustain himself with his literary work and is forced to take temporary jobs to supplement his income, which he finds demeaning. At one of his temp jobs, he meets a successful, slightly younger man named David Cohen. Julius seduces David, eventually moving in with him. He keeps Marina and Danielle away from David.

Meanwhile, Danielle begins two flirtations, one with Ludovic Seeley, an Australian editor who has moved to New York City to start a literary journal The Monitor (named after Le Moniteur Universel) and another with Marina's father Murray, who begins an email correspondence. Murray starts by using her job as a reason to contact her and later shifts to concern over Marina's unemployment.

Marina, still hanging on to the last traces of her "it girl" status, is unsettled by the arrival of her 19-year-old cousin Bootie, who has dropped out of university to pursue a program of educating himself by his own design. Bootie reveres the Thwaites and looks up to his uncle Murray, in whose footsteps he wants to follow; but Marina is dismissive, calling him "Fat Fredrick". She finds how he has installed himself in the Thwaite home creepy. Despite this, things quickly fall in line for Bootie. Murray is impressed by both his desire to leave his small town and his desire to self-educate. Murray offers him a salary and work as his private secretary. Through Marina, Bootie also is able to rent Julius's old apartment.

Though Danielle is more attracted to Seeley, she makes the mistake of introducing Marina to him as a possible hire as an editor for his magazine. Danielle watches from the sidelines as Seeley and Marina begin to work together and start a relationship. Seeley also inspires Marina to begin to work on her book anew, which she decides to name The Emperor's Children Have No Clothes, inspired by something that Seeley tells her. As the possibility of being with Seeley dissolves, Danielle begins sleeping with Murray.

Working as Murray's secretary, Bootie discovers that his uncle is not the high-principled man he once thought he was and discovers that he self-plagiarizes articles, dismisses low-paying events for star-studded ones and is writing a secret indulgent book, How to Live. Additionally, after discovering Murray's affair with Danielle, Bootie decides to write an exposé on Murray for The Monitor.

Over the 4th of July holiday weekend, Seeley and Marina become engaged, to the annoyance of Danielle and Murray, both of whom suspect that Seeley has some ulterior motive to take down Murray. Around the same time, Marina finishes her book and gives it to Murray to read. Finding it vapid and soulless, he urges her not to publish it, causing a rift between father and daughter. Around the same time, Bootie finishes his exposé on Murray and gives copies to his mother, Marina, and Murray. Expecting them to applaud him for his honesty, he is shocked when all three are horrified by what he has written. Making matters worse, Seeley likes the piece and wants to publish it, causing a fight between him and Marina.

Bootie becomes estranged from the Thwaites. Furthermore, after David loses his job, Julius takes back his apartment, forcing Bootie to move and rent a room in an apartment and begin temping downtown.

Marina goes forward with publishing her book and marrying Seeley. At their wedding, Danielle asks Murray to spend an entire night with her, something he has never done, always returning home after their trysts to his wife, Annabel. Murray has a cancellation on September 10 and thus decides to spend that night with Danielle. They spend the evening together, and the following morning are able to see the September 11 attacks from Danielle's apartment window. Terrified about what has happened, Murray abandons Danielle to go to Annabel. Danielle is heartbroken, realizing that though she thought of Murray as her soulmate, he has chosen Annabel over her. At the headquarters of The Monitor, Seeley realizes that his project is completely doomed as the launch was to take place that day, but the attacks mean that the magazine cannot go to print, and that all the articles will seem obsolete anyway. Bootie's mother Judy waits to hear from her son and becomes disconcerted as days pass and she hears nothing. She enlists the Thwaites to help find her son, and though they manage to track down the temp agency where he worked, they are unable to locate him and assume he has died.

In a state of shock over her breakup, Danielle contacts her mother, who takes her on a vacation to Miami. While there, Danielle sees Bootie working as a waiter. She tries to talk to him, but he tells her his name is Ulrich New. After she leaves him, he goes back to his hotel to flee once more.

== Characters ==
- Danielle Minkoff — a 30-year-old television producer for the documentary TV series The Monitor.
- Marina Thwaite — the 30-year-old daughter of critic Murray Thwaite who signed a book deal out of college and is living at home after spending her advance without completing the book.
- Julius Clarke — a 30-year-old, gay, half-white, half-Vietnamese critic who writes for The Village Voice.
- Bootie Tubb — a 19-year-old college dropout and the paternal cousin of Marina Thwaite.
- Murray Thwaite — a 61-year-old journalist, professor and author; Marina's revered father, married to her mother Annabel.
- Ludovic Seeley — an Australian editor newly moved to New York City who is launching a literary magazine.

== Reception ==
The New York Times named it one of the ten best books of 2006. It also received the 2007 Massachusetts Book Award for fiction.

== Editions ==
- Alfred A. Knopf, New York, 2006. Hardcover.
- Vintage Books, 2007. Trade paperback.
