= Hisham Matar =

American-born British-Libyan writer

- هشام مطر
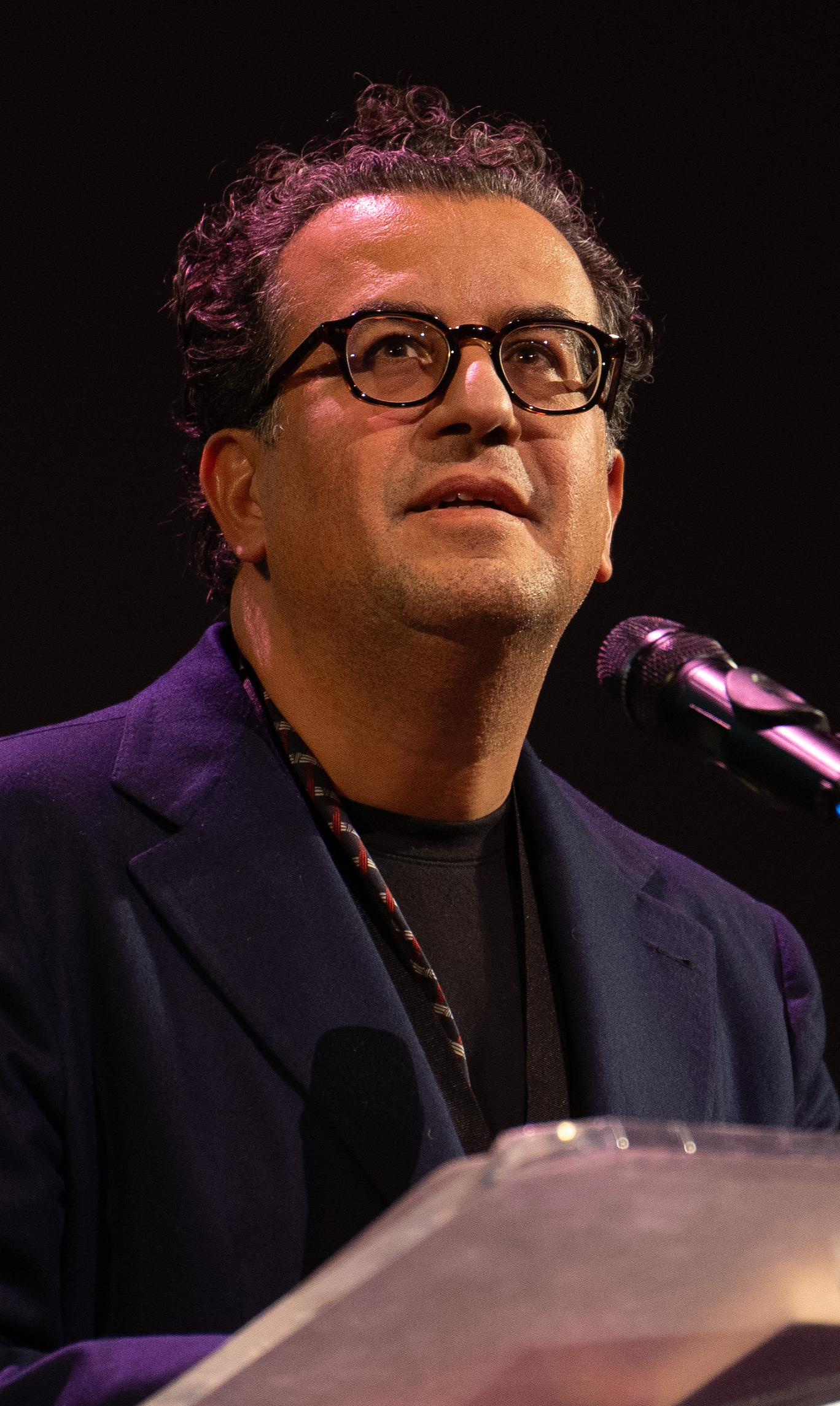
- Matar at the 2024 National Book Awards finalist reading
- Born: 1970 (age 55–56); New York City, U.S.
- Education: Goldsmiths, University of London
- Occupations: Novelist, essayist
- Writing career
- Period: Present
- Genres: Fiction, memoir
- Notable works: In the Country of Men; Anatomy of a Disappearance; The Return; A Month in Siena; My Friends
- Notable awards: Pulitzer Prize for Biography or Autobiography (2017)

Hisham Matar (Arabic: هشام مطر; born 1970) is an American-born British-Libyan novelist, essayist, and memoirist. His debut novel In the Country of Men was shortlisted for the 2006 Man Booker Prize, and his memoir of the search for his father, The Return, won the 2017 Pulitzer Prize for Biography or Autobiography and several other awards. Matar's essays have appeared in The New Yorker, The Guardian, The New York Times, and many other publications. He has also written several other novels.

== Early life and education ==
Hisham Matar was born in New York City in 1970, the son of Jaballa Matar, who was considered a political dissident for his opinions on Colonel Muammar Qaddafi's 1969 coup, and had to move the family away from Tripoli. He was working for the Libyan delegation to the United Nations, in New York, at the time of Matar's birth.

The family moved back to Tripoli in 1973, but fled the country again in 1979. Matar was nine when they moved to Cairo, Egypt, where the family lived in exile from 1980, and where Matar's father became more vocal against the Gaddafi regime.

After starting off in a public school in Cairo, Matar continued his schooling at Cairo American College from the age of 12. He did not enjoy his schooling there, and his academic achievements plunged compared with his time in Libyan and Egyptian public schools. He struggled with learning English, until he discovered a love for Billie Holiday, and also felt no affinity for his fellow students, most of whom were the offspring of American diplomats and military personnel.

In 1982, Matar's brother Ziad left for boarding school in the Swiss Alps. Though Matar desperately wanted to join his brother, he had to wait four more years until he too was 16. Because of the continued threats by the Libyan dictatorship against their father (as well as a threat to Ziad's safety while he was studying in Switzerland), however, he could not follow his brother to Switzerland. Both boys had to attend the schools under a false identity. Matar chose a school in England and enrolled in 1986, and started enjoying school again. He said in 2011:

I was to pretend that my mother was Egyptian and my father American. It was thought that this would explain, to any Arabs in the school, why my Arabic was Egyptian and why my English was American. My first name was Bob. Ziad chose it because both he and I were fans of Bob Marley and Bob Dylan. I was to pretend I was Christian, though not religious. I was to try to forget my name. If someone called Hisham, I was not to turn.

After trying his hand at music and finding that he had no talent for it, Matar studied architecture at Goldsmiths, University of London.

In 1990, while he was still studying in London, his father was abducted in Cairo. He has been reported missing ever since. In 1996, the family received two letters in his father's handwriting stating that he had been kidnapped by the Egyptian secret police, handed over to the Libyan regime, and imprisoned in the notorious Abu Salim prison in the heart of Tripoli. The letters were the last sign and only thing they had heard from him or about his whereabouts. In 2009, Matar reported that he had received news that his father had been seen alive in 2002, indicating that Jaballa had survived a 1996 massacre of 1200 political prisoners by the Libyan authorities.

== Career ==
For some years during his 20s, Matar ran his own architectural practice in London.

He started writing poetry, before moving to prose forms, as he found that his poems were becoming more narrative. He left his architectural practice, and worked in a variety of jobs, including acting, stonemasonry, and bookbinding, until his first novel, In the Country of Men was published in 2006.

As of October 2024 Matar is professor of professional practice in English and Asian and Middle Eastern cultures at Barnard College, Columbia University, but continues to live in London. He founded and is the principal curator of the Barnard International Artists Series, "a forum for considering the world through the works of living artists" (BIAS), which was launched in November 2012.

== Writing style, themes, and process ==
Matar has explored themes of loss and exile in his first two novels, as well as in his memoir, The Return: Fathers, Sons and the Land in Between. Matar's writing often borrows from and refers to painting, architecture, and music.

Matar on his writing process:

I start with very little: the more fragile, the better. The thread has to feel like it is about to snap. Sometimes I begin with a gesture or, in the case of "Naima," a feeling for a character. I had this feeling for Nuri, the protagonist and narrator. It is like that moment when you rush into the concert hall at the last minute. You find your seat as the lights go down. You have not seen the person sitting beside you, but you have a sense of them, of what they might be like, or of how the music is affecting them, the weight of their silence.

— Hisham Matar, The O. Henry Prize Stories

== Books ==
=== In the Country of Men ===
Matar began writing his first novel, In the Country of Men, in early 2000. In 2005, the publishers Penguin International signed him to a two-book deal. In the Country of Men was published in July 2006 and has been translated into 30 languages. ISBN 0-670-91639-0

=== Anatomy of a Disappearance ===
Matar's second novel, Anatomy of a Disappearance, contains a character whose father is taken away by the authorities; while Matar acknowledges the relation to his own father's disappearance, he has stated that the novel is not autobiographical. ISBN 0-670-91651-X

=== The Return ===
In 2016, Matar published his memoir The Return. The memoir centers on Matar's return to his native Libya in 2012 to search for the truth behind the 1990 disappearance of his father, a prominent political dissident of the Gaddafi regime. ISBN 0-670-92333-8

=== Il Libro di Dot ===
Il Libro di Dot is a children's book written by Matar and illustrated by Gianluca Buttolo, published in 2017. ISBN 978-8865671924

=== A Month in Siena ===
On 17 October 2019, Matar published A Month in Siena. The short book is an affectionate and reflective record of his most recent stay in Siena, Italy and his encounters there with Sienese School artworks. ISBN 9780593129135

=== My Friends ===
His novel, My Friends, about three Libyan exiles living in London from the 1980s to the 2011 Arab Spring, was published in 2024 by Random House in the United States and Viking in the United Kingdom. It was longlisted for the 2024 Booker Prize and the National Book Award for Fiction, and won the 2024 Orwell Prize for political fiction as well as the 2025 National Book Critics Circle Award for fiction.

== Essays ==
Matar's essays have appeared in The New Yorker, The Guardian, The Times Literary Supplement, The Financial Times Magazine, the London Review of Books, and The New York Times.

== Awards and honours ==
In 2013 Matar was elected Fellow of the Royal Society of Literature.

Matar has been awarded many fellowships, including:

- 2008: Mary Amelia Cummins Harvey Visiting Fellow Commoner at Girton College, University of Cambridge
- 2012: Ida Beam Distinguished Visiting Professor, International Writing Program, University of Iowa

Awards for his works include:

- 2006: Guardian First Book Award for In the Country of Men
- 2006: Man Booker Prize, shortlist for In the Country of Men
- 2007: Arab American Book Award for In the Country of Men
- 2007: Commonwealth Writers' Prize of Europe and South Asia for In the Country of Men
- 2007: Premio Gregor von Rezzori for In the Country of Men
- 2007: Premio Internazionale Flaiano for In the Country of Men
- 2007: Royal Society of Literature's Ondaatje Prize for In the Country of Men
- 2007: In the Country of Men named one of The New York Times "100 Notable Books of the Year"
- 2008: National Book Critics Circle Awards, nominated for In the Country of Men
- 2011: Anatomy of a Disappearance named one of the best books of the year by The Chicago Tribune, The Daily Beast, The Independent, The Guardian, The Telegraph, The Toronto Sun, Irish Times
- 2012: Arab American Book Award, shortlist for Anatomy of a Disappearance
- 2012: "Naima", included in The PEN/O. Henry Prize Stories collection of short stories
- 2013: International Dublin Literary Award longlist for Anatomy of a Disappearance
- 2016: Baillie Gifford Prize, shortlist for The Return
- 2016: Costa Biography Award, shortlist for The Return
- 2016: Los Angeles Times Book Prize – Christopher Isherwood Prize for Autobiographical Prose, finalist for The Return
- 2016: The Slightly Foxed Best First Biography Prize for The Return
- 2016: The Return cited as one of The New York Times' "Top 10 Books of 2016"
- 2017: Geschwister-Scholl-Preis for The Return
- 2017: National Book Critics Circle Award for Autobiography, Finalist for The Return
- 2017: PEN/Jean Stein Book Award for The Return
- 2017: Premio Libro Del Año, Gremio de Libreros de Madrid for The Return
- 2017: Prix du livre étranger (France) for The Return
- 2017: Pulitzer Prize for Biography or Autobiography for The Return
- 2017: Rathbones Folio Prize for The Return
- 2024: Booker Prize longlist for My Friends
- 2024: Orwell Prize for Political Fiction, winner for My Friends
- 2025: National Book Critics Circle Award for Fiction, winner for My Friends
