= The Wilderness (Harvey novel) =

2008 novel by Samantha Harvey

- Author: Samantha Harvey
- Audio read by: Sean Barrett
- Language: English
- Genre: Literary fiction
- Publisher: Jonathan Cape (UK); Nan A. Talese (US)
- Publication date: 5 February 2009 (UK); 17 February 2009 (US)
- Publication place: United Kingdom
- Media type: Print, audiobook, ebook, kindle, audible
- Pages: 336 pp
- ISBN: 9780224086073 (hardcover 1st ed.)
- OCLC: 267171833
- Dewey Decimal: 823/.92
- LC Class: PR6108.A7875 W55 2009

The Wilderness is a novel by British author Samantha Harvey, published in 2009 by Jonathan Cape. It was shortlisted for the Orange Prize for Fiction and longlisted for the Man Booker Prize.

== Overview ==
The story follows an ageing architect, Jake, who is suffering from Alzheimer's. Jake attempts to deal with his condition as his life deteriorates.

== Reception ==
The Wilderness received mostly positive reviews from critics. In a review for The Observer, Olivia Laing said the book's "lyrical power" was matched by its "absolute emotional realism".

The Evening Standard said The Wilderness "touches a resounding chord of melancholy".

== Awards ==
In 2009, The Wilderness was shortlisted for the Orange Prize for Fiction, making Harvey the only British author to be shortlisted that year.

The novel was also longlisted for the 2009 Man Booker Prize.

Year	Award	Category	Result	Ref.
2009	AMI Literature Award	—	Won	
2009	Betty Trask Prize and Awards	Betty Trask Prize	Won	
2009	Guardian First Book Award	—	Shortlisted	
2009	Man Booker Prize	—	Longlisted	
2009	Orange Prize for Fiction	—	Shortlisted	
