= History of Albuquerque, New Mexico =

History of American city

The history of Albuquerque, New Mexico dates back up to 12,000 years, beginning with the presence of Paleo-Indian hunter-gatherers in the region. Gradually, these nomadic people adopted a more settled, agricultural lifestyle and began to build multi-story stone or adobe dwellings now known as pueblos by 750 CE. The Albuquerque area was settled by the Tiwa people beginning around 1250. By the 1500s, there were around 20 Tiwa pueblos along a 60-mile (97 km) stretch of the middle Rio Grande valley. The region was visited by Spanish conquistadores beginning with the expedition of Francisco Vázquez de Coronado in 1540–41, and began to be settled by Spanish colonists after the expedition of Juan de Oñate in 1598. By 1680, 17 Spanish estancias were reported along the Camino Real in the Albuquerque area.

The settlers were driven out by the Pueblo Revolt in 1680. When they returned in 1692, they were able to re-settle the abandoned estancias. In 1706, the recently appointed governor of New Mexico, Francisco Cuervo y Valdés, officially designated the community as a royally chartered town and named it Alburquerque. The settlement remained small and dispersed throughout the 1700s, eventually coalescing into a series of plazas of which the largest was today's Old Town. Possession of the town, along with the rest of New Mexico, passed to Mexico in 1821 and then to the United States in 1846. These developments brought increased commerce and Albuquerque prospered as a trading hub and U.S. Army post.

In 1880 the Atchison, Topeka, and Santa Fe Railway reached Albuquerque, but the establishment of the depot some distance from the plaza led to the creation of a rival "New Town" that quickly outstripped the older community. New Town was dominated by recently arrived Anglo-Americans and European immigrants who modeled its buildings and institutions on those they remembered back home. Albuquerque soon resembled a typical small American city, and was incorporated in 1891. The city grew rapidly in the early 20th century, spurred in part by the tuberculosis treatment industry, and then even faster after World War II when it became a major scientific and military hub. Since the 1940s, the city has seen major urban sprawl with a focus on decentralized, auto-oriented development. As the city has continued to grow, officials have tried to encourage denser development, revitalization of the Downtown area, and improved transportation.

== Native American presence ==
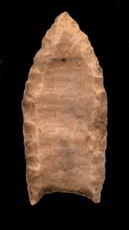
Folsom points are some of the earliest artifacts found in the Albuquerque area

Archaeological sites in the Albuquerque area show evidence of Paleo-Indian cultures dating back up to 12,000 years, including Folsom points and mastodon remains found at Sandia Cave. Gradually, the nomadic hunter-gatherers who roamed the area began to adopt a more settled, agrarian lifestyle, coinciding with the introduction of cultivated maize from Mexico during the Early Basketmaker II Era (1500 BCE–50 CE). By 750 CE, these Ancestral Puebloan people had begun to build multi-story stone or adobe dwellings now known as pueblos.

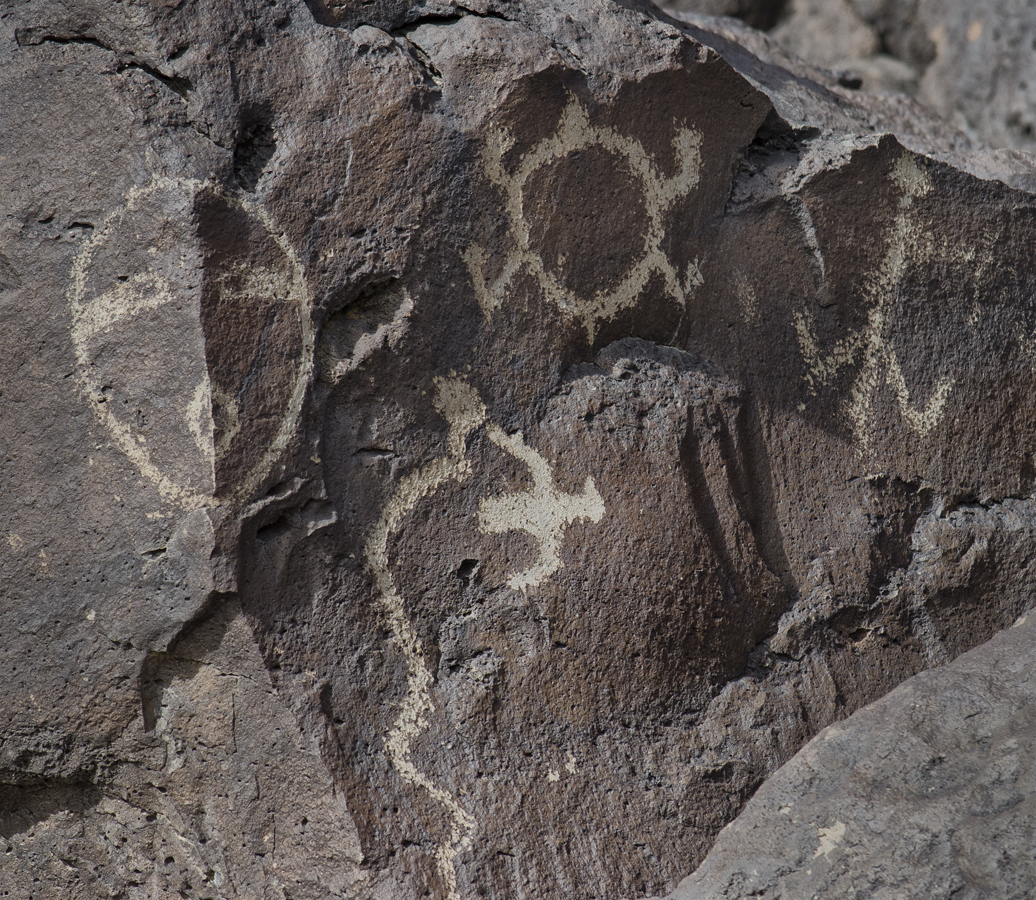
Images carved by Pueblo people can be found at Petroglyph National Monument

The middle Rio Grande valley was settled by Puebloans, specifically the Tiwa people, beginning around 1250. By the 1500s, there were around 20 Tiwa pueblos along a 60-mile (97 km) stretch of river from present-day Algodones to the Rio Puerco confluence south of Belen. Of these, 12–13 were densely clustered near present-day Bernalillo and the remainder were spread out to the south. The Pueblo people left thousands of petroglyphs carved into the basalt cliffs west of the city, now preserved as Petroglyph National Monument.

The Navajo, Apache and Comanche peoples are also likely to have visited the Albuquerque area, as there is evidence of trade and cultural exchange between the different Native American groups going back centuries before European conquest.

== Early colonists ==
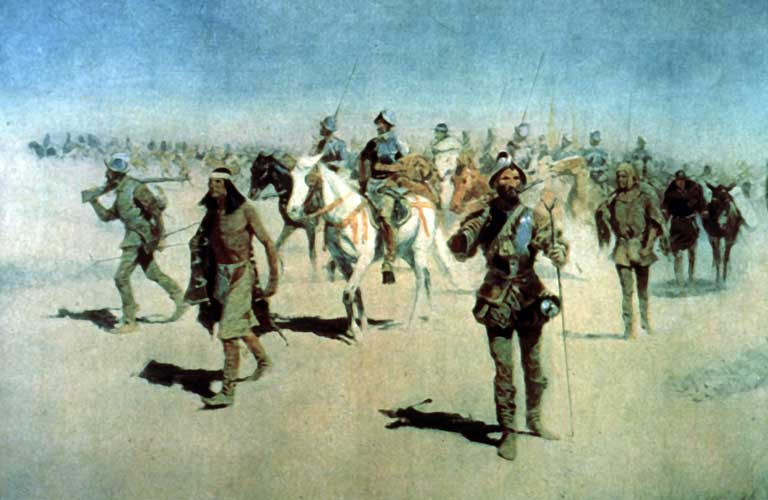
Coronado's expedition as depicted in a c. 1900 painting by Frederic Remington

European exploration of New Mexico began with the expedition of Francisco Vázquez de Coronado in 1540–41. A small party led by Hernando de Alvarado reached the central Rio Grande valley in September 1540, followed later by Coronado himself. The explorers called the area Tiguex Province after its Tiwa inhabitants. Alvarado described the province as a "broad valley planted with fields of maize and dotted with cottonwood groves. There are twelve pueblos, whose houses are built of mud and are two stories high." The Spanish were welcomed at first, but relations became more hostile after Coronado's men commandeered one of the Tiwa pueblos for their winter quarters, forcing the inhabitants out without any supplies. The conflict culminated in the Tiguex War, in which Coronado attacked and burned several of the Tiwa pueblos. The surviving inhabitants were forced to flee and only returned to their pueblos after Coronado had left in 1542.

The first colonizing expedition into New Mexico was led by Juan de Oñate in 1598, after which settlers began to trickle into the middle Rio Grande valley along the Camino Real. In the vicinity of modern-day Albuquerque, missions were established at Isleta Pueblo in 1613 and Sandia Pueblo in 1617. In 1630 the Tiwa province was reported as having a population of 7,000 living in 15–16 pueblos. Subsequently, the number of Native Americans dropped drastically due to famine, Apache raiding, and a severe smallpox epidemic in 1636–1641. By the 1640s the Tiwa population was concentrated into four major pueblos: Isleta, Sandia, Puaray, and Alameda. The population loss of the pueblos opened new territory to Spanish settlers, who established scattered estancias along the Rio Grande. By 1680, 17 estancias were reported in the Albuquerque area.

While the Native Americans had reluctantly accepted the Spanish presence at first, they grew increasingly resentful after decades of poor treatment. The Spanish demanded tribute from each Pueblo household in the form of corn and blankets or hides, often seizing the goods by force, and Native laborers were conscripted into all manner of projects, often on an extralegal, unpaid basis. Furthermore, the Franciscan missionaries outlawed the native religion and burned sacred artifacts. After years of famine, mistreatment, and unchecked Apache raiding, the Native Americans rose up in a coordinated attack, the Pueblo Revolt, in 1680. The revolt succeeded in driving the Spanish out of New Mexico for the next 12 years.

== Founding of Alburquerque ==
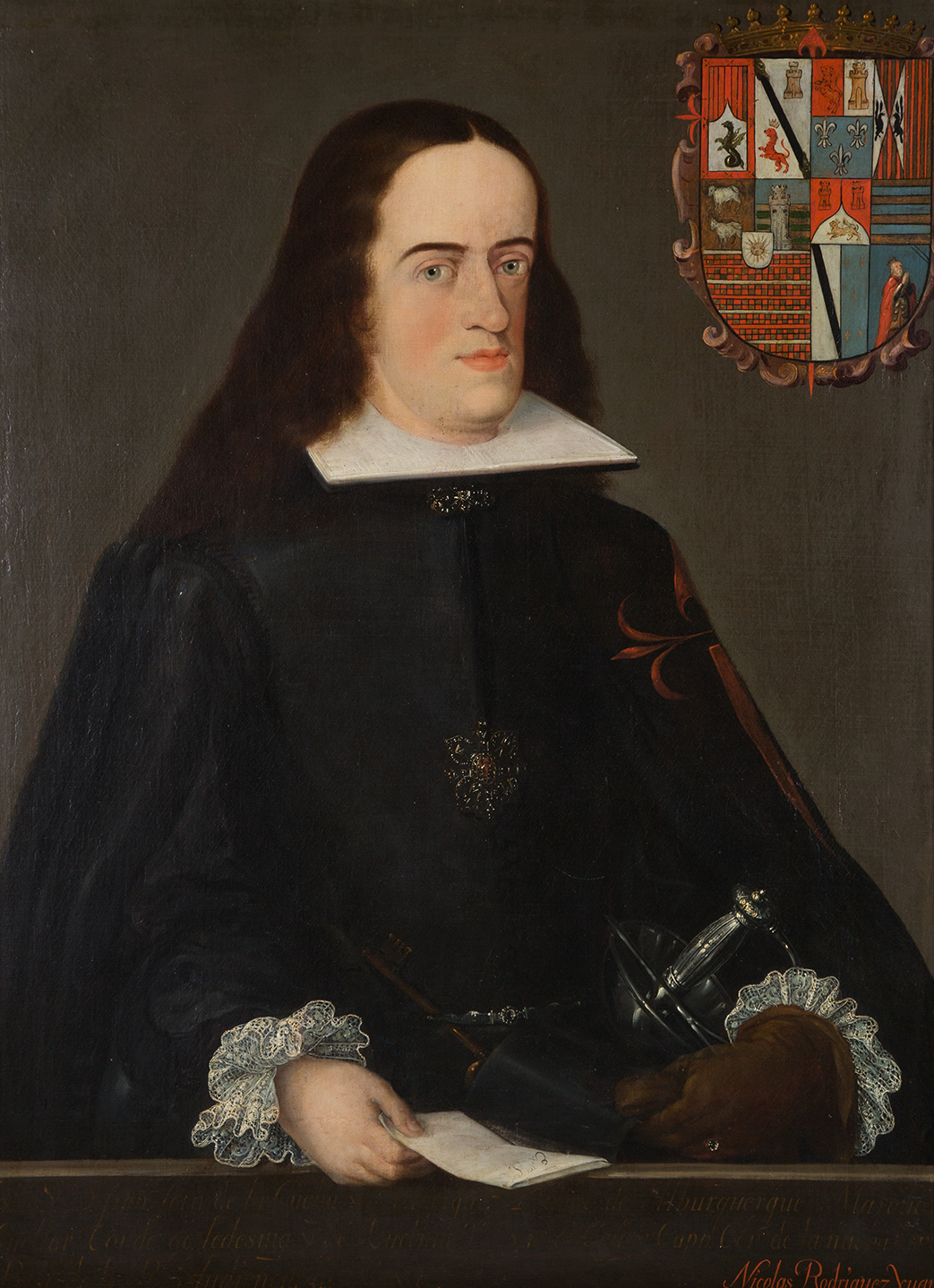
Albuquerque's namesake, the 10th Duke of Alburquerque

The Spanish returned in 1692 and were able to recapture the territory without much resistance. Returning settlers established communities at Bernalillo and Atrisco in the late 1690s. In 1705, Francisco Cuervo y Valdés arrived in Santa Fe as the newly appointed governor of New Mexico. Eager to prove himself, Cuervo decided to establish a villa, or royally chartered town, in the Rio Abajo region. This would be only the fourth New Mexican town to hold the prestigious title, after Santa Fe, El Paso (now in Texas), and Santa Cruz de la Cañada.

Cuervo chose a good site on the Camino Real, near a ford of the river, and stationed a detachment of soldiers there in order to encourage settlers to move in. On April 23, 1706, he drafted a formal document declaring that he had founded La Villa de San Francisco Xavier de Alburquerque. The town was named after Cuervo's superior, Viceroy of New Spain Francisco Fernández de la Cueva, 10th Duke of Alburquerque, with whom Cuervo clearly hoped to curry favor. In order to also honor the recently crowned King Philip V, colonial authorities had the name changed to San Felipe de Neri de Alburquerque. (The first "r" in Alburquerque was later dropped by early English-speaking visitors and this misspelling has persisted.)

The Spanish Laws of the Indies dictated that a villa should be a compact settlement organized around a plaza, with a minimum of 30 families. In his report, Cuervo asserted that the new villa had 35 families with 252 residents and that the plaza and streets had been laid out, houses built, and the church was finished, thereby meeting the requirements. However, it later emerged that many of these claims were exaggerated. According to depositions recorded during an official inquiry in 1712, there had only been 19 founding families, which together with the ten soldiers and their families numbered 129 citizens in total. Furthermore, rather than building a new town, the settlers had just re-inhabited old haciendas abandoned during the revolt. These houses were spread out over a distance of 2.5 miles (4.0 km) unlike the compact town Cuervo had described. Despite these findings, the villa's charter was never revoked.

== Spanish and Mexican rule ==
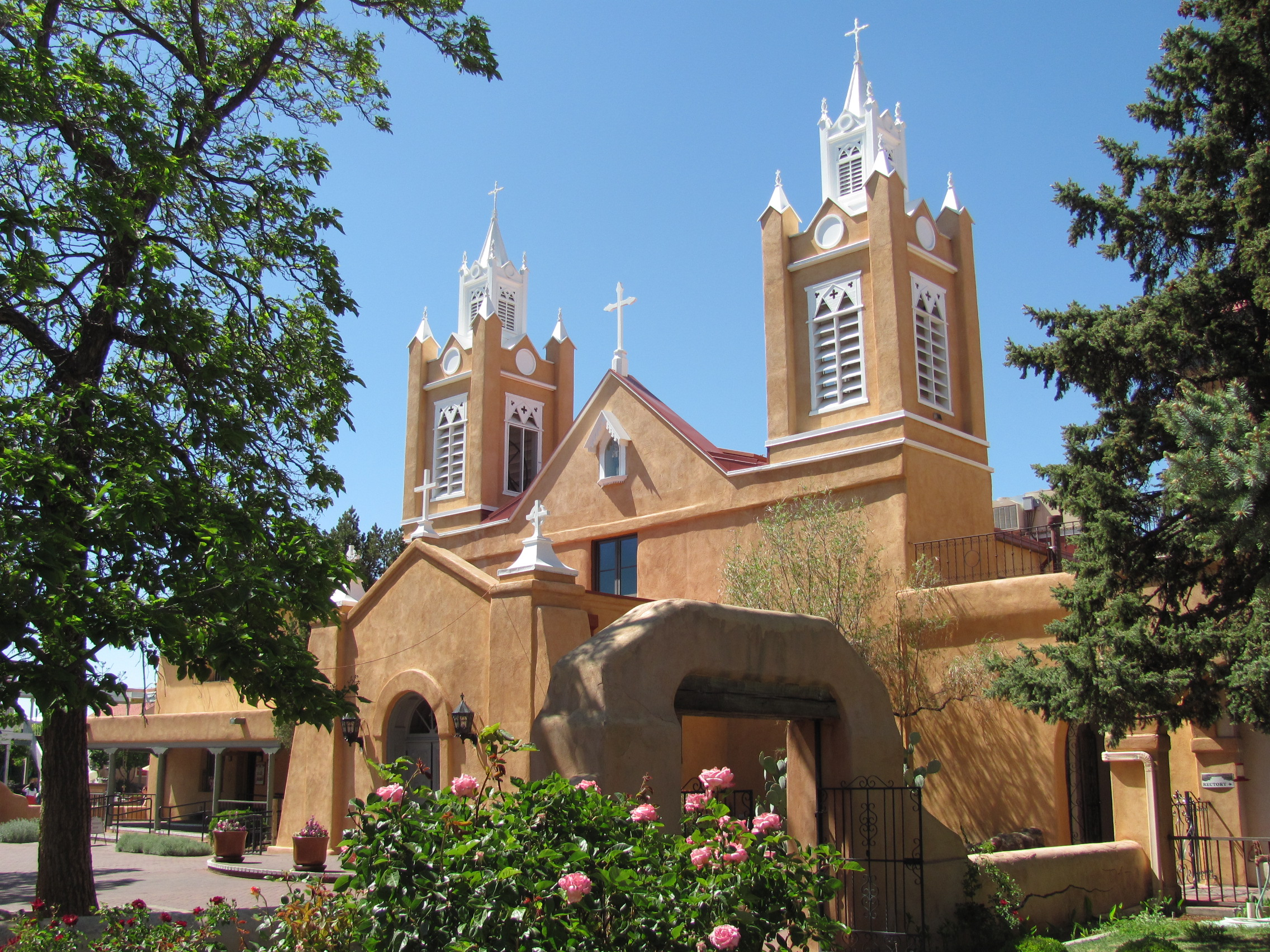
San Felipe de Neri Church, originally built in 1793

The Albuquerque plaza evidently was still not finished at the time of the 1712 hearings, but eventually the settlers did lay out a real town. Like other Spanish colonial settlements, the villa consisted of a central plaza surrounded by houses, government offices, and a church. For much of the 18th century, the homes around the plaza were inhabited only on Sundays as the residents spent the rest of the week on their farms. It was not until the late 1700s that a permanent population was established at the plaza.

According to a 1776 report by Fray Atanasio Domínguez, the villa had 157 families with 763 total inhabitants. Domínguez also gave a brief description of the community:

...it stands on the plain near the meadows of the Rio del Norte. The villa itself consists of twenty-four houses near the mission. The rest of what is called Albuquerque extends upstream to the north, and all of it is a settlement of ranchos on the meadows of the said river for the distance of a league from the church to the last one upstream. Some of the lands are good, some better, some mediocre. They are watered by the said river through very wide, deep irrigation ditches, so much so that there are little beam bridges to cross them. The crops taken from them at harvest time are many, good, and everything sown in them bears fruit. There are also little orchards with vinestocks and small apricot, peach, apple, and pear trees. Delicious melons and watermelons are grown. Not all those who have grapes make wine, but some do. The citizens are of all classes and walks of life as in the other places I have mentioned, and they speak the local Spanish.

Frequent Apache and Navajo raids compelled the settlers to consolidate their scattered dwellings into a series of outlying plazas, which were easier to defend. Upriver from the main plaza, these included Los Duranes, Los Candelarias, Los Griegos, Los Gallegos, Los Poblanos, and Los Ranchos. The Spanish census of 1790 lists 248 families for all seven plazas (84 at the main plaza) with a total population of 1,136. The range of occupations listed shows that most of the residents were involved in farming or sheep-herding, with few specialized trades. The census records show that most of the inhabitants were mestizos and that interracial marriages were common. The villa's population was estimated as 2,625 in 1810 and 4,075 in 1816.

In 1821, Mexico gained its independence from Spain following the Mexican War of Independence. While change was slow to come to the remote province of New Mexico, one major effect was the opening of the region for the first time to American trade. Beginning in the 1820s, the Santa Fe Trail brought American goods and merchants to New Mexico in ever-increasing numbers. Albuquerque's location on the Camino Real also made it a stopover for traders traveling south to the Mexican interior. The Mexican census of 1827 gives a population of 2,547, and shows a more diverse range of occupations than in 1790, including merchants, craftsmen, and a teacher.

== Territorial period ==
In 1846, during the Mexican–American War, U.S. forces under Stephen W. Kearny entered New Mexico and were able to take control of the territory without resistance. Kearny marched into Albuquerque in September to raise the U.S. flag and administer an oath of allegiance to the local residents. Kearny's troops established a U.S. Army post near the plaza, which brought an influx of goods and people over the next twenty years. In general, the townspeople welcomed the American military presence, which stimulated the local economy and helped put an end to decades of Native American raiding. An account of the town was given by U.S. Attorney William W.H. Davis in 1853 as he traveled the territorial District Court circuit:

The town of Albuquerque is venerable with age. ... The population is not more than fifteen hundred, a few families only being descendants of the ricos of other days. The town is irregularly laid out and badly built. In the centre is a plaza of some two or three acres in extent, and into which the principal streets lead. The houses are generally grouped about without order, and the best are but indifferent mud buildings, some of the more humble ones being partly in ruins. ... The army depots are located here, which causes a large amount of money to be put in circulation, and gives employment to a number of inhabitants.

The 1860 Census showed a population of 1,608, of which the army garrison made up about a third, and indicated that some Albuquerque residents had amassed considerable wealth. During the U.S. Civil War, Confederate troops under Henry Hopkins Sibley captured Albuquerque in March 1862 during the New Mexico Campaign. The Confederates continued on to the north, but were later forced to retreat back to Texas after losing most of their supplies at the Battle of Glorieta Pass. When they occupied Albuquerque for a second time on April 8, Union forces under Edward Canby engaged them in the Battle of Albuquerque, a long-range artillery skirmish with few casualties. In general, the war did not have much of an impact on the community.

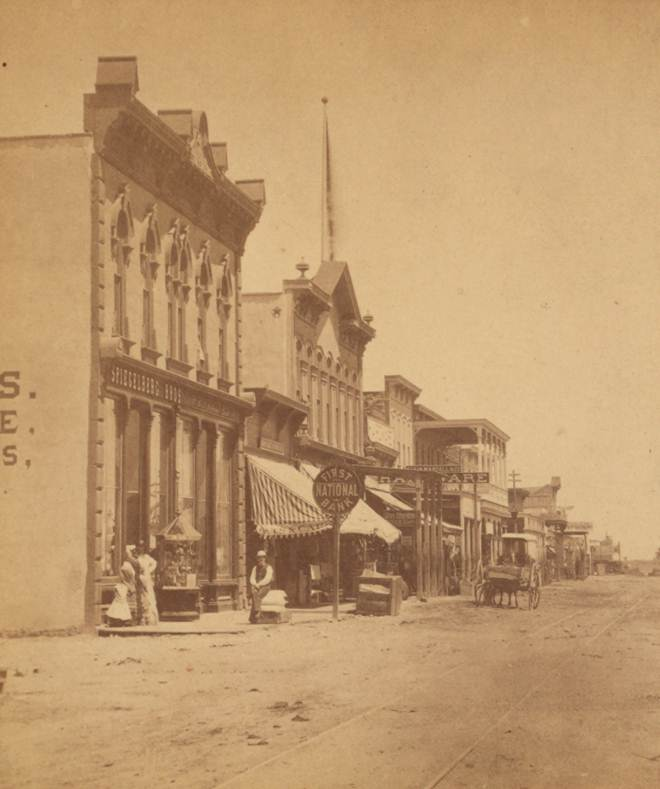
First Street in New Town, as depicted in a stereogram from the 1880s

== Railroad era ==
The late 1870s saw the building of New Mexico's first railroad, the Atchison, Topeka, and Santa Fe Railway. As construction proceeded south from Raton Pass, survey crews were trying to find a site for a planned locomotive maintenance facility. Meanwhile, real estate speculators in Albuquerque hoped to profit from the railroad's arrival. Three local businessmen, Franz Huning, Elias S. Stover, and William Hazeldine, formed the New Mexico Town Company to buy up land for the railroad and related development. Ultimately the company was able to assemble a 3.1-square-mile (8.0 km^{2}) parcel which today is known as the Albuquerque Original Townsite. However, the site was actually a considerable distance from the existing community around the plaza—about 1.5 miles (2.4 km)—which meant that in effect the new development was a completely separate town. It became known as New Albuquerque, or just New Town.

The first train pulled into Albuquerque in April 1880, and development of New Town began immediately. Unlike Old Town with its long-established, primarily Hispanic population, New Town was dominated by recently arrived Anglo-Americans and European immigrants, and its built environment reflected their tastes and attitudes. Civil engineer Walter G. Marmon was hired to lay out the town, creating an orderly grid with numbered streets like those in the Midwest. Stores, hotels, and saloons sprang up, operating out of flimsy wooden buildings or even tents at first, then more substantial brick structures. A mule-drawn street railway was built to ferry passengers between Old Town and New Town along Railroad Avenue (now Central Avenue). Albuquerque was incorporated as a town in 1885, and Henry N. Jaffa was elected as the first mayor. The town's early development was described by Sylvester Baxter in an article for Harper's:

To the rapid growth of the place I can testify. Returning after a month's absence in 1881, I found that the number of buildings had about doubled. The manufacture of adobes was going on at a prodigious rate, and there was a lively clatter of carpentry in the erection of frame buildings. ... Visiting Albuquerque again a year and a half later, in 1882, I found the changes that had taken place in the mean time still more remarkable. Where at that time there was but one business street, lined with an inferior class of buildings, and scattering houses dotted here and there over the level fields, outlining the anatomy of the town that was to be, the skeleton had become clothed with good solid urban flesh, or to speak more literally, with brick, stone, adobe, and timber. The buildings now stood in sturdy ranks. Railroad Avenue had been paralleled by another and a handsomer business street named Gold Avenue; the intersecting cross streets had also been built up with business houses; large and glittering plate-glass windows were filled with attractive goods in the latest fashions... The first brick had been manufactured in the town only a few months before, and there were already numerous brick buildings of substantial architecture on the business streets. Altogether Albuquerque had become the most city-like looking town in the Southwest, and a place of bright prospects—"a second Denver," it was called.

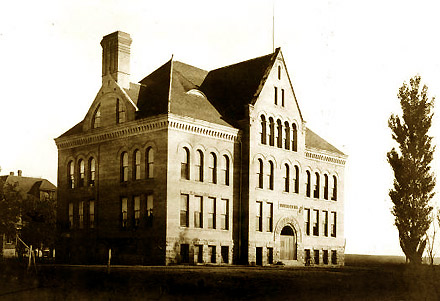
The University of New Mexico's Main Building in 1904

The 1890 Census reported a population of 3,785, and Albuquerque was incorporated as a city the following year. A public school system also started in 1891, and primary schools were built in each of the city's four wards. Most of the city's early residential development took place in the Second Ward, which included Albuquerque's first subdivision, the Highland Addition, and the Third Ward, which was an ethnically diverse area home to a large number of railroad employees and other working-class citizens. In 1892, the University of New Mexico began operation. Its campus, consisting of a single building for almost a decade, occupied a remote location on the high ground known as the East Mesa, more than 1 mile (1.6 km) east of downtown.

== Early twentieth century ==
By 1900, Albuquerque had a population of 6,238, with another 1,200 recorded for Old Town; in 1910, the population was 11,020. The city's largest employer was the American Lumber Company sawmill, which employed over 850 people in 1906. Many others worked at the AT&SF Railroad Shops, the stockyards, or the Southwestern Brewery and Ice Company. In 1904, the venerable horse-drawn trolley was replaced by a modern electric streetcar line. By 1916, the streetcar system had 7 miles (11 km) of track with multiple lines connecting Old Town, the railroad depot, Barelas, the sawmill, the Highland Addition, and the university. In order to attract more riders, the streetcar company developed Traction Park in Old Town, which hosted horse racing and baseball as well as the Territorial Fair. In 1905, it was reported that 60,000 people rode the streetcar during the week of the fair.

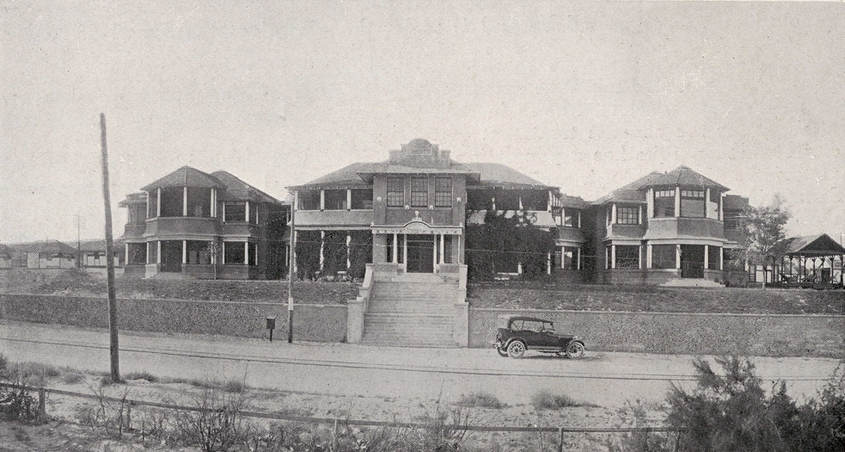
The Southwest Presbyterian Sanatorium in 1911

A major factor that brought many people to Albuquerque in the early 20th century was the dry climate, which was believed to be ideal for tuberculosis patients. The first sanatorium opened in 1902, and eventually there were as many as 16. These facilities were concentrated in the sandhills leading up to the East Mesa, particularly on East Central Avenue which became known as "TB Row." Two of the largest were St. Joseph Hospital (now Lovelace Medical Center) and the Southwest Presbyterian Sanatorium (now Presbyterian Hospital), both of which are still in operation. In 1915, it was estimated that tuberculosis patients made up more than 20% of the city population, with the percentage including family members possibly as high as 50%.

These newcomers included Rubén Cobos and Clyde Tingley. Both were major civic figures in New Mexico. Cobos was a folklorist, musician, and journalist who became a professor at the University of New Mexico and would go on to write the first dictionary of New Mexican Spanish. Tingley would come to play a major role in the Albuquerque's development over five decades in local politics. An advocate for active city government, Tingley was responsible for a wide range of civic improvements including parks, roads, landscaping, and other projects.

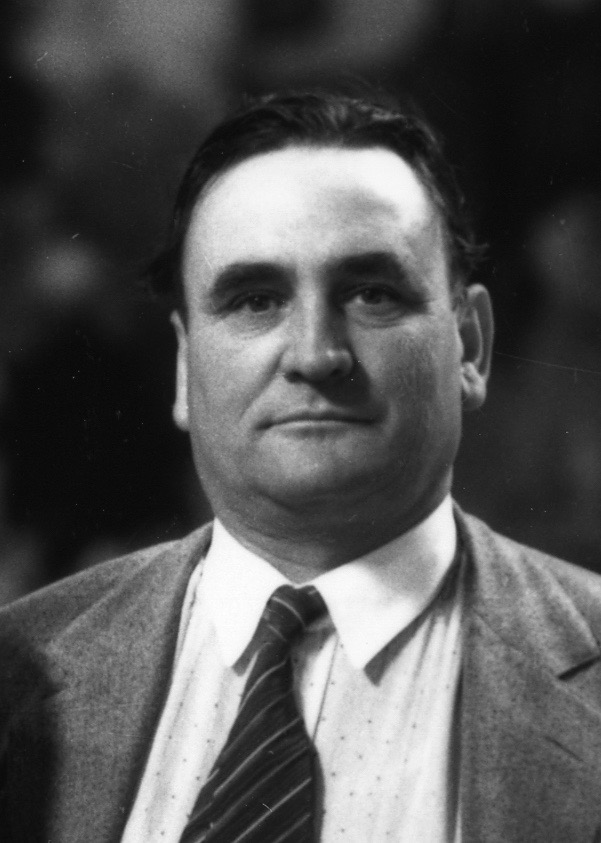
Clyde Tingley was an important civic leader from the 1920s through the 1950s

By 1920, Albuquerque had a population of 15,157, and housing subdivisions had begun to extend eastward along Central Avenue. In 1922, the city saw construction of its first skyscraper, the nine-story First National Bank Building. At the same time, the number of automobiles in the city was rapidly increasing. A study from 1928 recorded thousands of vehicles per day on the major roads, with less than 5% consisting of horse-drawn traffic. As cars became common, the city saw a shift from compact streetcar- and pedestrian-oriented development to a more suburban land-use pattern. Between 1925 and 1941, the city quadrupled in area. Streets started to be paved, and the streetcar system was replaced by buses in 1928.

In 1926, U.S. Route 66 was established. The highway initially ran through Albuquerque on a north–south alignment along 4th Street, but in 1937 it was rerouted to its more famous east–west alignment along Central Avenue. Over the next several decades, the road brought a steady stream of travelers through town, and dozens of motels, diners, and gas stations were built to accommodate them. At its peak, 98 motels lined the road from one end of the city to the other. Another transportation-related development to come to Albuquerque in the 1920s was air travel, with the first airport beginning scheduled service in 1928.

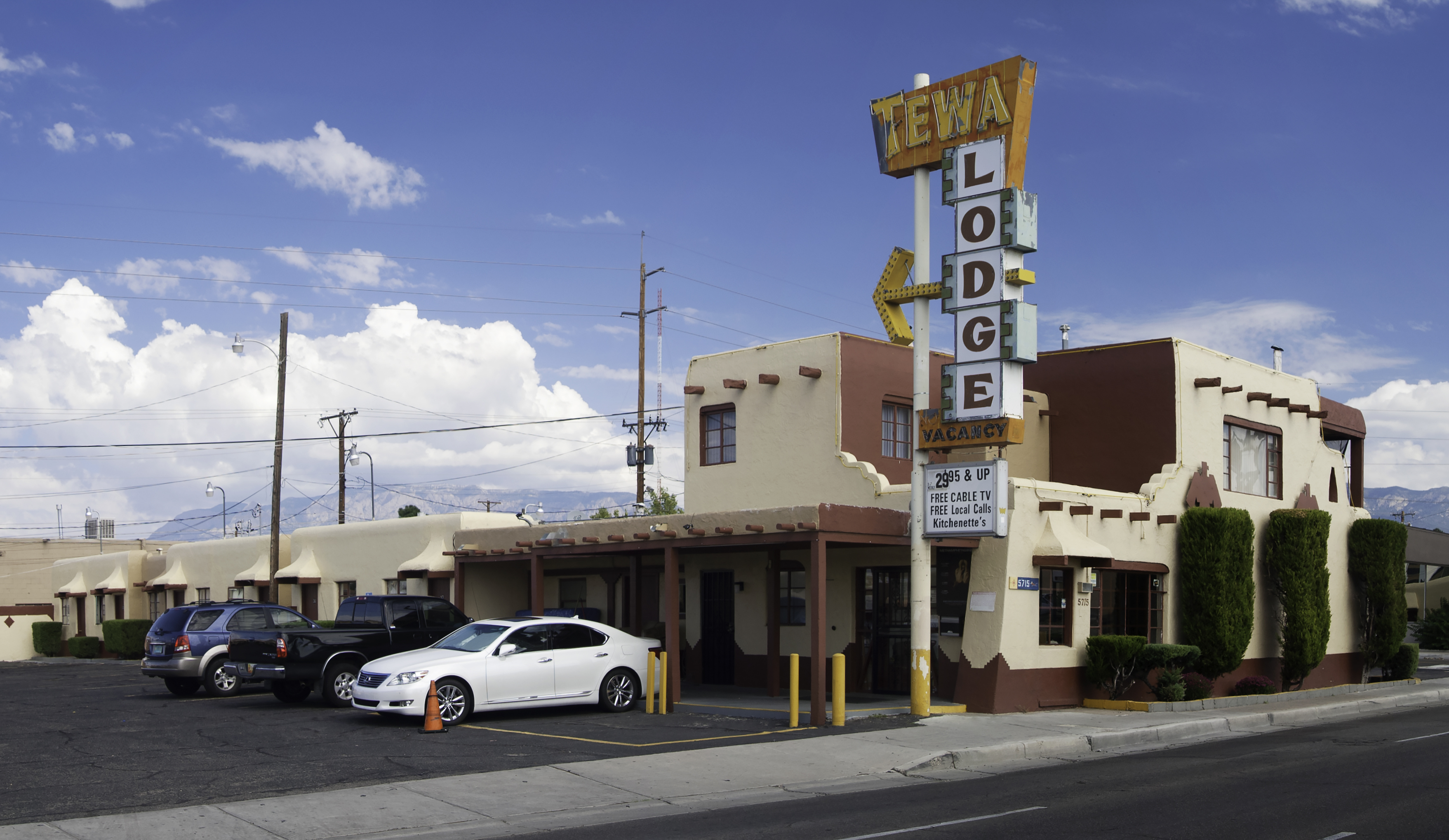
The Tewa Lodge is one of many motels built on Route 66 in Albuquerque

During the Great Depression in the 1930s, Albuquerque saw a wide variety of public works projects thanks to the New Deal programs enacted by President Franklin D. Roosevelt. Under the influence of Clyde Tingley, who took office as Governor of New Mexico in 1935, some of the projects included new fairgrounds for the New Mexico State Fair, a new Albuquerque Municipal Airport, three grade-separated railroad crossings, and a variety of schools, community centers, and other public buildings. The city continued to grow, reaching a population of 35,499 in 1940.

== Postwar growth ==
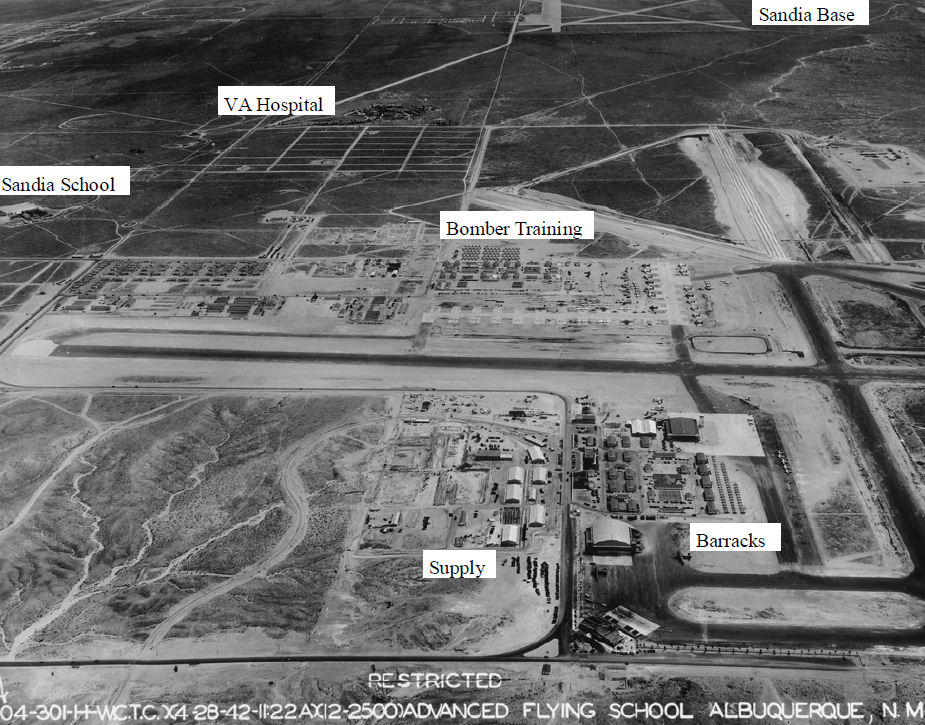
Albuquerque Army Air Base in 1942

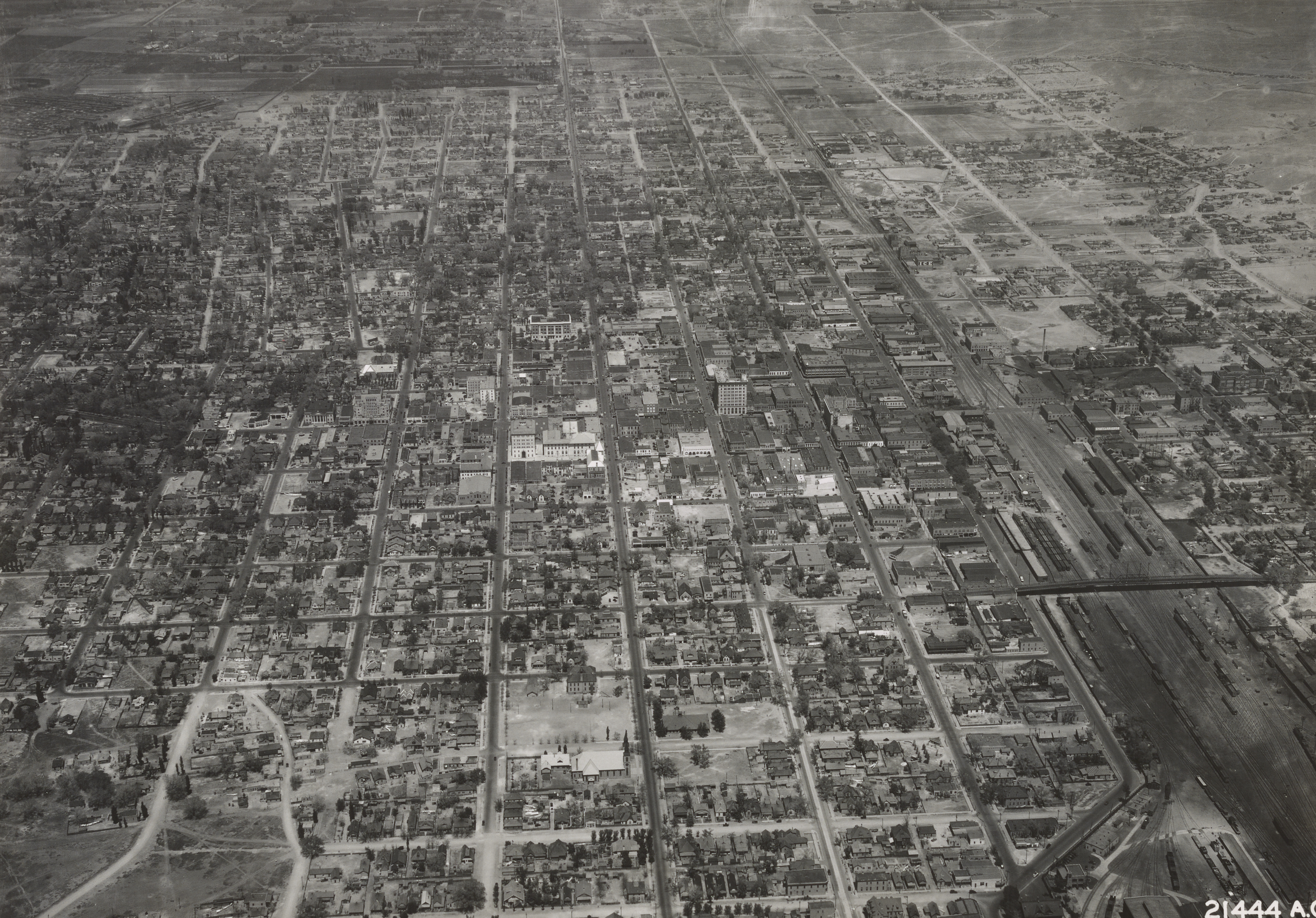
Aerial image of Albuquerque, 1945

World War II brought a great deal of activity to Albuquerque. In 1941, the army took over the old Albuquerque Airport, then known as Oxnard Field, and converted it into Albuquerque Army Air Base (now Kirtland Air Force Base). Concurrently, the top-secret Manhattan Project put New Mexico at the center of nuclear weapons research. After the war, this research continued at Sandia Base, now Sandia National Laboratories. With the combined effect of these large government employers and a broader population shift toward the western cities, Albuquerque's population exploded. From 1940 to 1950 the population nearly tripled, to 96,815, and then doubled again to 201,189 by 1960.

Local developers struggled to keep up with the runaway growth, building nearly 12,000 new houses during the 1940s. Houses spread into the Northeast Heights in increasingly large subdivisions, where new homeowners were able to take part in the suburban lifestyle idealized at the time. The largest of these was Princess Jeanne Park, with over 1,600 houses. Built by local developer Dale Bellamah starting in 1954, the neighborhood epitomized 1950s suburban living so well that one of its houses was replicated in a Smithsonian exhibit in 1994. As the city continued to annex these new subdivisions, its area increased almost sixfold between 1940 and 1960.

Although Albuquerque did not have a strong tradition of institutionalized racism, many of the postwar suburban developments were racially segregated with covenants prohibiting black or Asian people from buying property there. Instead, the city's small African American population was concentrated in the inner city, particularly the South Broadway neighborhood. In the 1950s, the city's first suburban black neighborhood was built in the East End Addition, although it never grew very large. Albuquerque passed a civil rights ordinance barring racial discrimination in public accommodations in 1952, and segregated housing was banned in 1963.

Old Albuquerque, which had remained a separate town since the arrival of the railroad, was finally absorbed into the city in 1949. The community had struggled during the early 20th century as most of its businesses and institutions moved to New Town: the county courthouse was moved in 1926, and by the 1930s barely any businesses were still operating around the plaza. Things began to improve in the 1940s as Albuquerque citizens started to take note of Old Town's historic value, and the Old Albuquerque Historical Society was established in 1946. Subsequently, Old Town gradually developed into a popular tourist attraction, with most of the adobe houses re-purposed into shops, restaurants, and galleries.

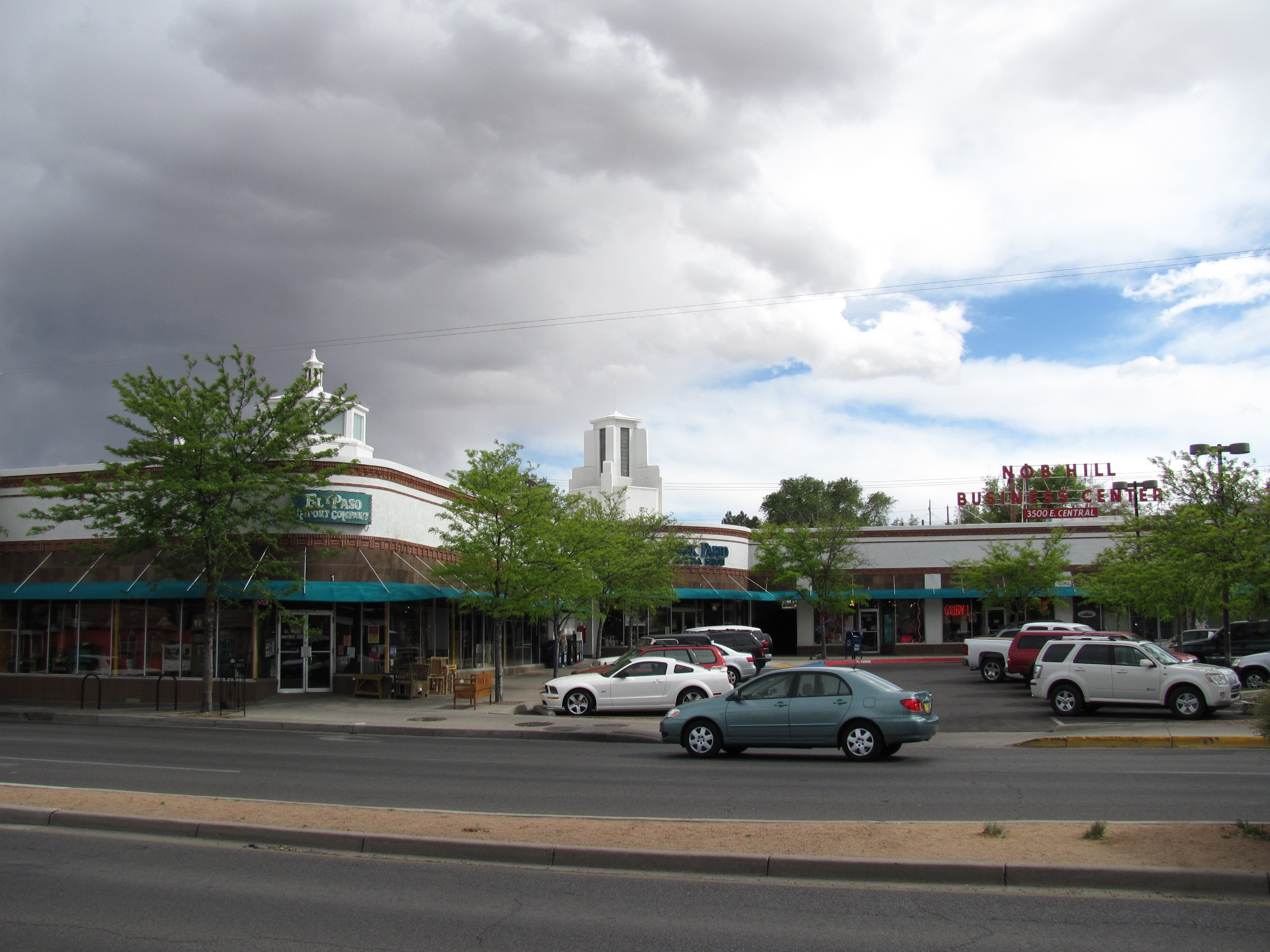
Nob Hill Business Center was a model for decentralized commercial development in Albuquerque

In the 1940s, Downtown was still the city's commercial center, but this began to change as residents of the new suburban developments increasingly preferred to shop in their own neighborhoods. One of the first suburban commercial projects was the Nob Hill Business Center, which opened in 1947. Its developer, Robert Waggoman, was initially mocked for building a large commercial center far from Downtown, but it was Nob Hill's decentralized strip mall model and not the large downtown department stores that would guide future development. The migration of people and businesses out of the inner city to the suburban Heights mirrored broader urban flight trends throughout the U.S.

During World War II, airmen cadets from the Royal Air Force, flying from their training base at Terrell, Texas, routinely flew to Albuquerque on training flights. The city served as a stand-in for the British for Warsaw, Poland which is the same distance from London, England as Albuquerque is from Terrell.

== 1960s and 70s ==
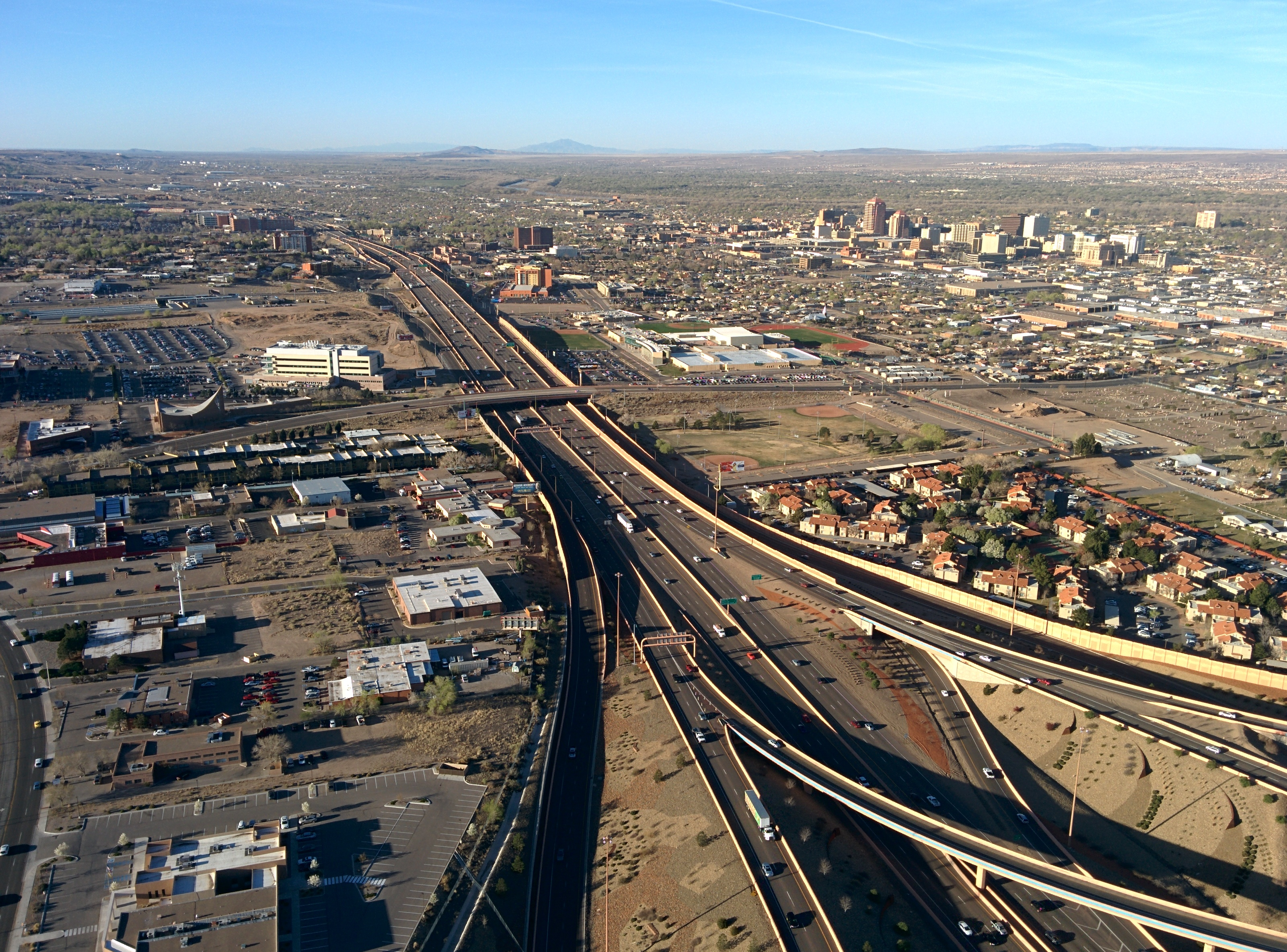
The Pan-American Freeway was built during the 1960s

Albuquerque continued to expand in the 1960s, though the pace of new construction was slower than in the 1950s. Contiguous subdivisions gave way to even greater urban sprawl as far-flung developments like Paradise Hills and Rio Rancho started to appear on the West Side. Planning for an urban freeway system began shortly after passage of the Federal Aid Highway Act, and construction on the north–south Pan-American Freeway and the east–west Coronado Freeway began in the late 1950s. The last link in the project, the Big I interchange, was dedicated in 1966. The freeways improved access to the suburbs, but also diverted most traffic away from Downtown and the traveler-oriented Route 66 corridor. Another new development in the 1960s was the opening of Albuquerque's first shopping malls, Winrock Center in 1961 and Coronado Center in 1965.

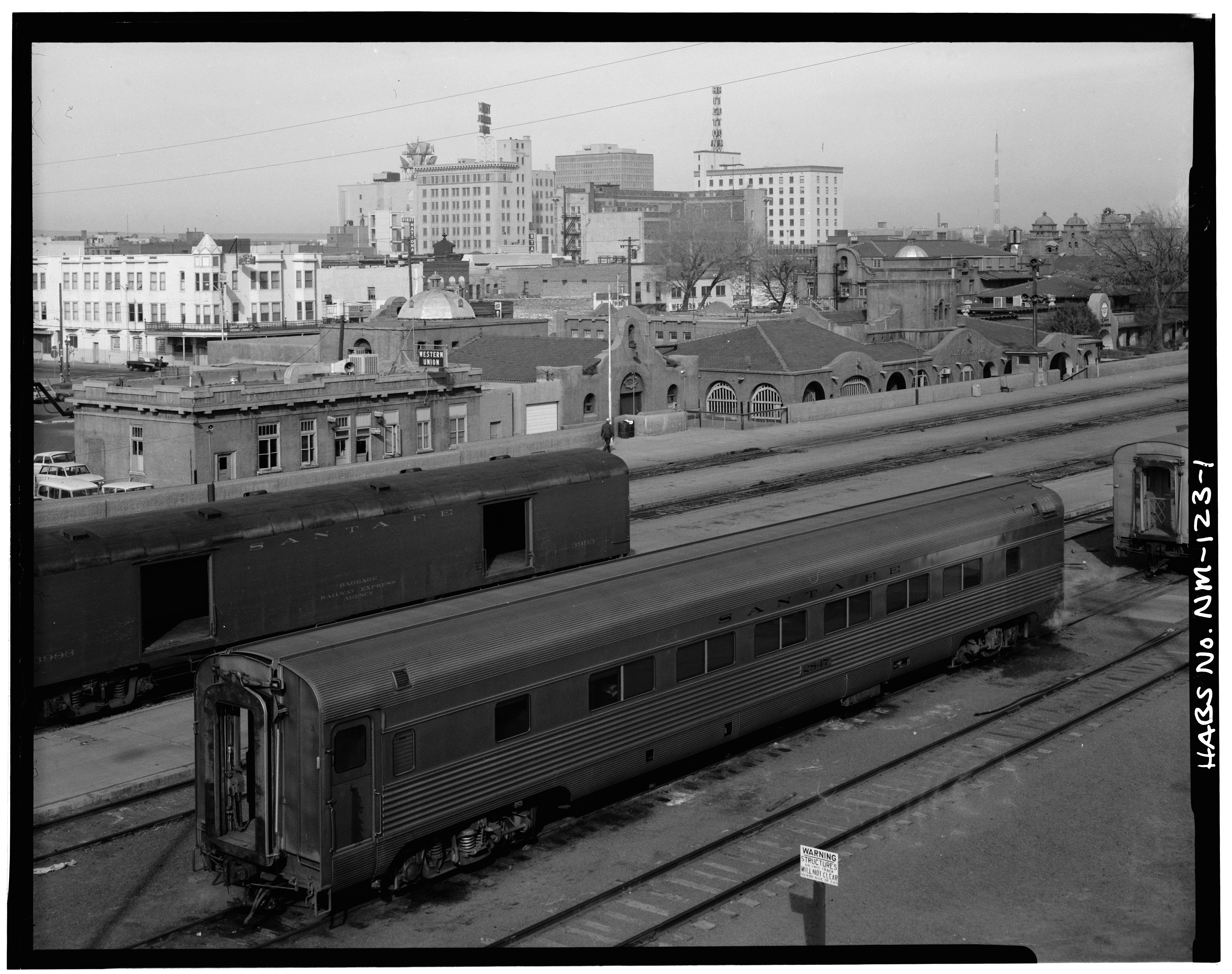
Downtown Albuquerque in the late 1960s, prior to most of the urban renewal projects

Much like other cities throughout the U.S., Albuquerque experienced urban decay in the inner city as economic activity continued to shift toward the suburbs. Beginning in the late 1960s, city officials tried to tackle the problem with a variety of urban renewal projects. The prevailing urban planning philosophies of the day, which drew on the ideas of Le Corbusier, favored a top-down, monumental approach rather than more organic development. In Albuquerque, as in many other cities, this led to wholesale demolition of older buildings in favor of large new projects like Civic Plaza and the Albuquerque Convention Center. Almost no pre-1900 buildings were left standing, and some of the city's most notable landmarks were razed, including the famous Alvarado Hotel.

Albuquerque also experienced its share of social turbulence during the 1960s and 1970s. While crime had not been much of a problem during the 1950s, by 1969 the Albuquerque metropolitan area was reported to have the second highest crime rate in the country behind only San Francisco. At the same time, activism was on the rise, including Chicano groups like the Brown Berets and La Alianza as well as anti-Vietnam War protests, African American civil rights, and other causes. Relations with police were often tense. An antiwar protest at UNM in 1970 saw National Guard troops mobilized to disperse the crowd with teargas and bayonets, while two people were shot by police at another protest in 1972 which shut down Interstate 25. In 1971, a confrontation between police and a large crowd at Roosevelt Park devolved into a full-blown riot, with violence and looting in several parts of the city. Things calmed down later in the 1970s as the police department made an effort to improve community relations and some of the more militant groups started to be discredited.

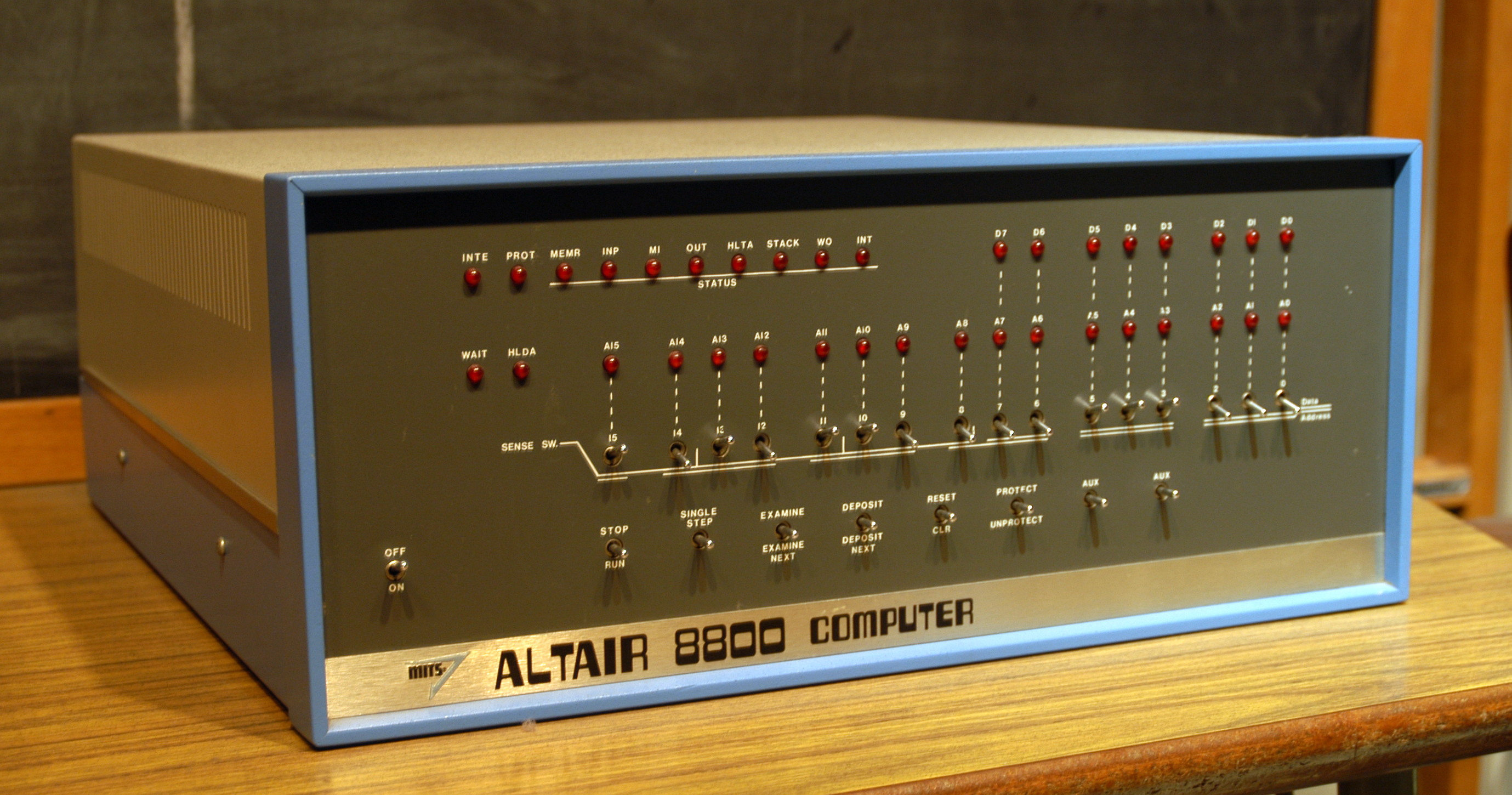
The Altair 8800 computer designed by MITS

Other changes between 1960 and 1980 reflected Albuquerque's increasing stature as a city with over a quarter million inhabitants. The Sunport was upgraded to an international airport, with a new terminal built in 1965 and expanded in 1971. In 1966, the popular Sandia Peak Tramway and UNM's well-known basketball arena The Pit opened. The city's most famous annual event, the Albuquerque International Balloon Fiesta, began in 1972, the same year the Albuquerque Dukes began play in the highest level of Minor League Baseball. During the 1970s, Albuquerque found itself at the center of the fledgling personal computer industry when MITS, a local electronics company, attracted attention with their $400 Altair 8800 computer. Microsoft, now one of the world's largest software companies, was founded in 1975 when Paul Allen and Bill Gates came to Albuquerque to write software for the Altair. The company's headquarters remained in the city until 1979.

== Since 1980 ==
Albuquerque's population has continued to grow since the 1970s, reaching 545,852 in 2010. Much of this growth has occurred on the West Side, creating traffic problems and demand for more river crossings. However, construction of new bridges was opposed by North Valley residents who wanted to preserve the area's rural character. Two new bridges were approved by the state government in 1980, but took years to materialize due to legal wrangling. After making some design compromises, the city managed to complete the Paseo del Norte Bridge in 1987, while the even more controversial Montaño Bridge was not finished until 1997. Increasing traffic also affected the freeways; by 1999 the Big I interchange was reported to be the 10th worst traffic bottleneck in the entire country. In order to alleviate the problem, the interchange was completely rebuilt in 2000–02 at a total cost of $293 million.

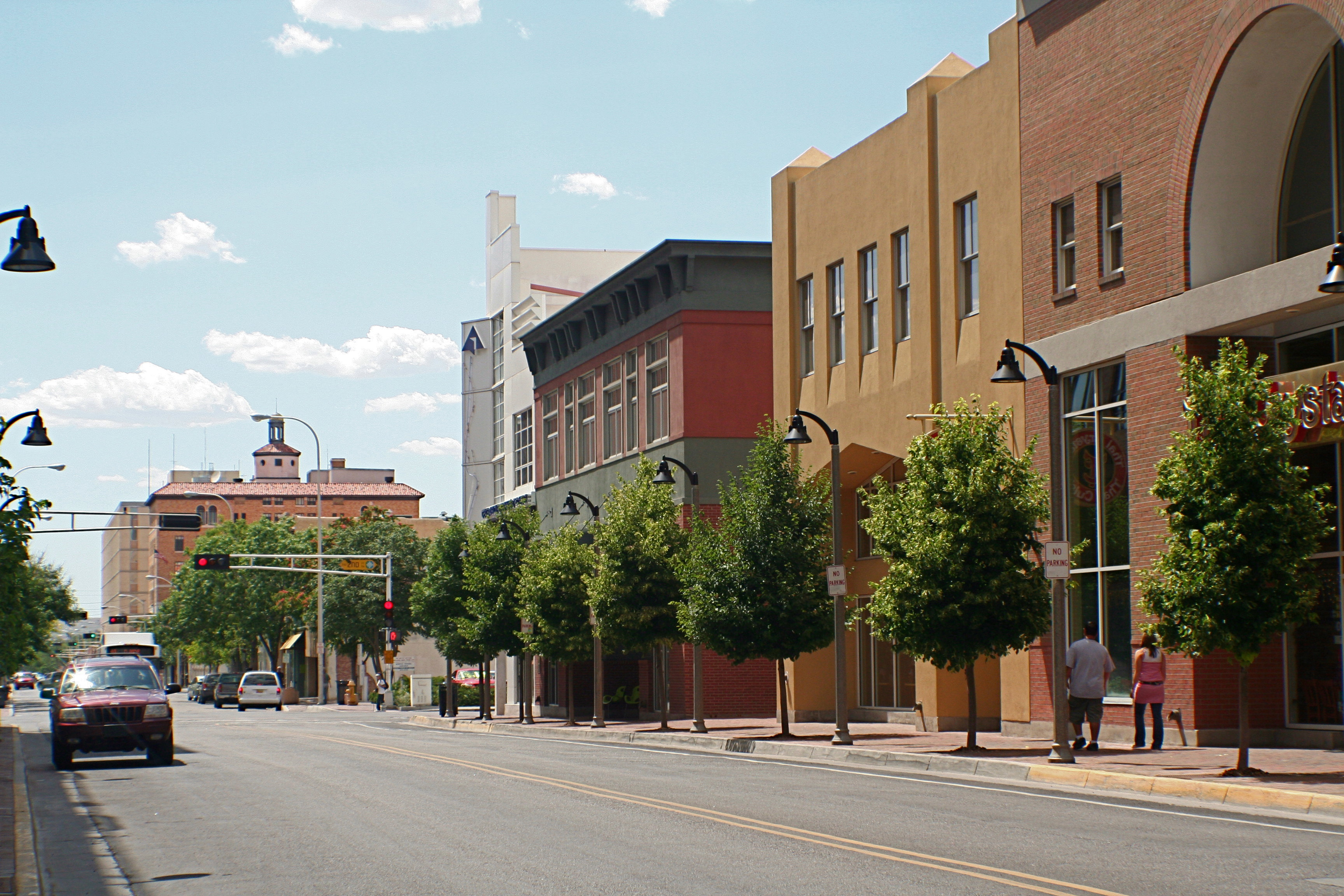
Downtown Albuquerque has seen more infill construction since the 1970s

Revitalizing Downtown has continued to be a topic of discussion. Since the failure of the 1970s urban renewal projects, the city has placed more emphasis on infill and smaller-scale development. Some of the earlier changes have been undone, including restoring the original traffic flow on a number of streets. Downtown has seen a number of new residential and commercial projects and has succeeded in developing a busy nightlife district, but other challenges remain. The city has also paid more attention to historic preservation, including purchasing buildings like the De Anza Motor Lodge and El Vado Auto Court to keep them from demolition. A notable success of this effort was the redevelopment of the abandoned Old Albuquerque High School in the early 2000s. Attempted redevelopment of the vacant Rail Yards property has been ongoing for some time as well.

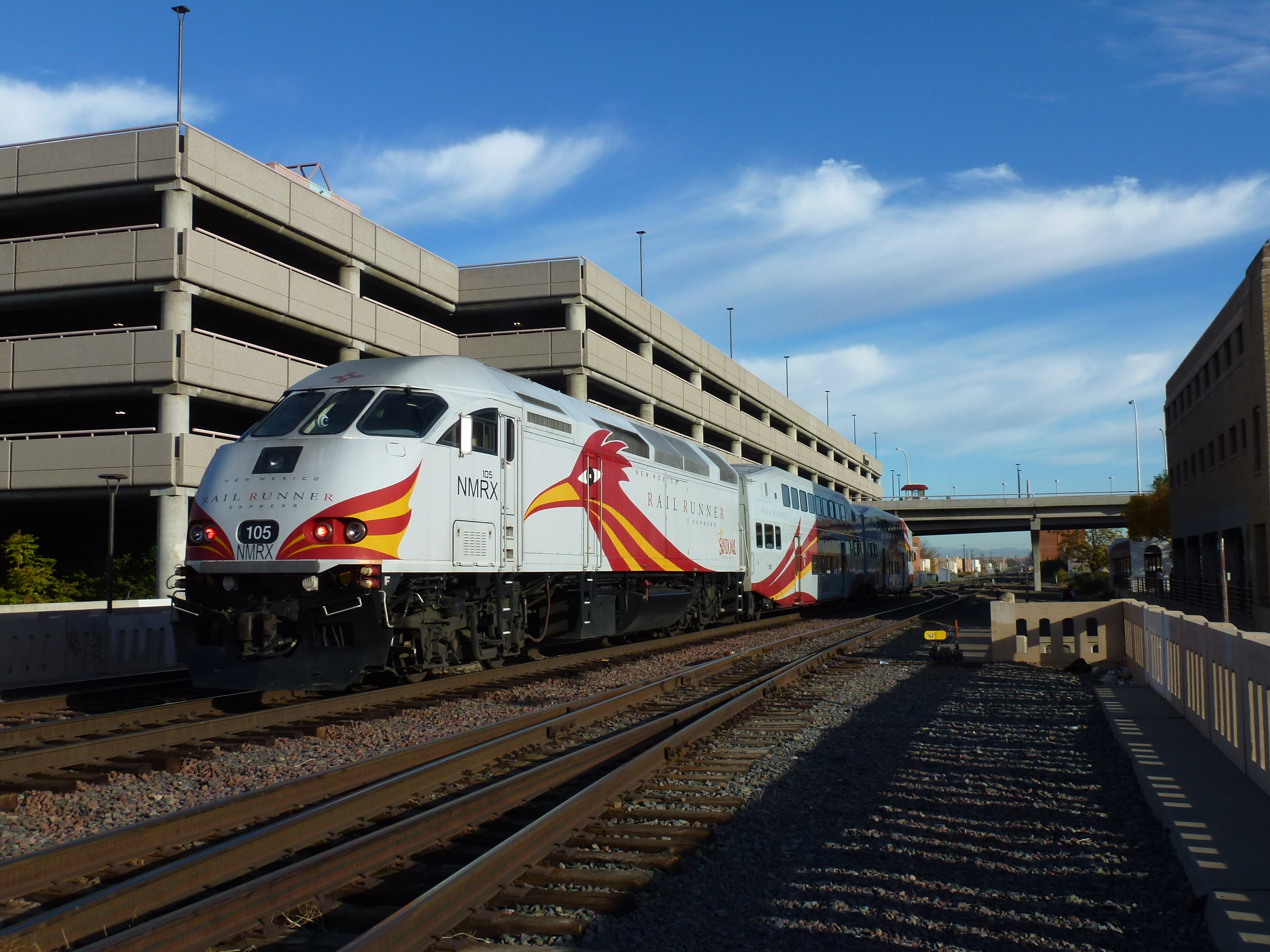
The New Mexico Rail Runner Express began operation in 2006

Along with a focus on denser development, the city has tried to improve mass transit options, particularly along the busy Central Avenue corridor. Restoring streetcar or light rail service along Central was an idea promoted by Mayor Martin Chávez in particular, though it never came to fruition. Instead, the city has focused on improving bus service along the corridor. The Rapid Ride express bus service was established in 2004, eventually expanding to three lines. In 2016, construction began on the Albuquerque Rapid Transit project, a bus rapid transit line with dedicated lanes and stations. Another transit-related development was the inauguration of the New Mexico Rail Runner Express commuter rail system in 2006.

The Albuquerque Police Department became a focus of headlines in the early 2010s due to the rate of shootings by police officers, with 27 people killed and 15 others wounded between 2010 and 2014. This was reported as the highest rate of fatal police shootings in the country. Many of those shot were dealing with mental illness, calling into question officers' preparedness for dealing with such situations. Criticism intensified even more after the shooting of James Boyd in early 2014, which sparked protests and vigils after lapel camera footage of the incident was made public. Later that year, the U.S. Department of Justice completed a 16-month investigation, concluding that APD had demonstrated a "pattern or practice of use of excessive force". While the rate of shootings has decreased since federally mandated changes were enacted, the department has struggled with officer recruitment and retention, falling to just 820 officers in 2016. This has been blamed in part for the city's rising crime rate and was a major issue in the 2017 mayoral election.

== See also ==
- Timeline of Albuquerque, New Mexico
