= García López de Cárdenas =

Spanish explorer

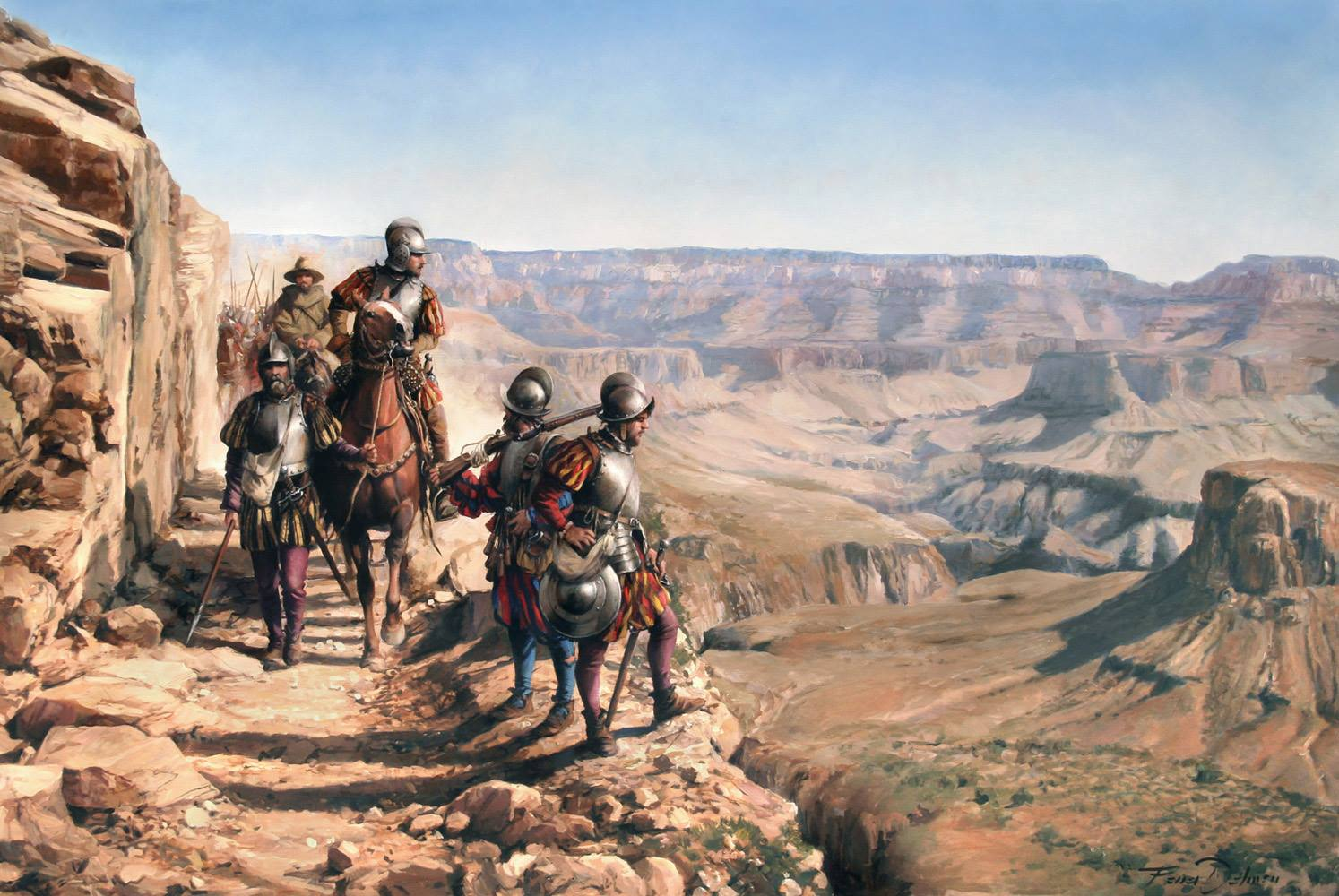
- La conquista del Colorado depicts García López de Cárdenas exploring the Grand Canyon in 1540.
- Born: c. 1500; Llerena, Badajoz, Crown of Castile
- Occupation: Conquistador
- Known for: First European to sight the Grand Canyon

García López de Cárdenas y Figueroa was a Spanish conquistador who was the first European to see the Grand Canyon.

== Life ==
Cárdenas was born in Llerena, then part of Crown of Castile, second son to Alonso de Cárdenas, 1st Count of La Puebla del Maestre, and wife Maria García Osorio. He was the Encomiendador of Caravaca.

López de Cárdenas was a conquistador attached to the exploits of Francisco Vázquez de Coronado. Expeditions, including one led by Pedro de Tovar, had heard reports of a large river north of Cíbola (Zuñi). Cárdenas was dispatched in September 1540 by the general stationed in Cíbola with the express mission of locating such a river and returning within 80 days. Pedro de Sotomayor accompanied him to record the event as a cronista, along with Hopi guides, Spanish soldiers, and an unknown number of servants. After some twenty days of marching in a northerly direction, he was successful; but his band found difficulties in reaching the river (which was the current Colorado River, that they called River Tizon), owing to the sheer vertical distance down from their position. They were standing on the South Rim of the Grand Canyon, somewhere between present-day Desert View and Grandview Point. Cárdenas ordered three soldiers, including Pablo de Melgrossa and Juan Galeras, to descend into the canyon. After several days of failed attempts to reach the river (his men were suffering from dehydration), his party was forced to return to Cíbola.

Cárdenas was the only member of the Coronado Expedition to be convicted of war crimes afterward because of his role in the brutal Tiguex War.

== See also ==
- Age of Discovery
- Francisco Vázquez de Coronado
