= Melchor Díaz =

Spanish conquistador (d. 1541)

- Portrait of Melchor Díaz

Mayor of Culiacan
- In office 1531–1541
- Appointed by: Nuño de Guzmán
- Monarch: Charles I of Spain

Personal details
- Born: Melchior Díaz; 1505 Spain
- Died: 1541 (aged 40–41) Altar Desert, New Spain
- Cause of death: Impaled by Lance at Thigh & Bladder
- Resting place: Buried in an unmarked grave near his death site.
- Occupation: military commander; politician; Conquistador
- Known for: First European to set foot and explore inland California

Military service
- Allegiance: Spain
- Rank: Senior captain
- Commands: Auxiliary Party during 1540 Coronado Expedition
- Battles/wars: Spanish colonization of the Americas; Skirmish of Rio de Tizon

Melchor Díaz (1505 – January 1541) was a Spanish conquistador who was Governor of Culiacan. He is best known for leading a 25-man auxiliary party during the 1540 Coronado expedition. In December 1540 Díaz crossed the Colorado River which he named the Rio de Tizon (River of Embers), making him the first European in the modern state of California to set foot and explore west of the Colorado River, reaching mudpots near Cerro Prieto, and in the Imperial Valley.

During his Colorado River exploration Díaz was intending to find a route to the Southern Sea however low supplies combined with a freak accident on Díaz forced the party back to Corazon Valley in Sonora, New Spain.

Díaz was part of the Spanish explorers and conquistadors who began the first phase of the Spanish colonization of California.

== Personal life ==
Díaz was described by historical writer George Parker Winship as "a hard worker and skillful organizer and leader", who "inspired confidence in his companions and followers, and always maintained the best of order and of diligence among those who were under his charge".

== 1539 expedition ==
He was placed in charge of the town of San Miguel de Culiacán by Nuño de Guzmán. When in 1539, Fray Marcos de Niza returned from Pimería Alta reporting he had seen the fabled cities of Cibola, Viceroy Antonio de Mendoza sent Díaz as the leader of a small expedition preliminarily to determine if reports by Fray Marcos were true. The information he gained was to benefit Coronado's planned and much larger expedition. He departed on November 17, 1539.

== Coronado 1540 expedition ==
When Díaz failed to return at the expected time, Coronado embarked without him in February 1540. Díaz and Coronado met en route, and Díaz joined Coronado's group. Coronado then sent him on his second expedition to locate and investigate some villages reported in the area. He found the villages and reported they did not live up to the grand descriptions that had been given. Díaz was then sent ahead by Coronado to secure feed for the expedition's livestock.

In July 1540, Díaz was sent to take the now-mistrusted and hated Fray Marcos back to Mexico and (say some reports) to take over leadership of the outpost at San Geronimo (or Hieronimo) in the valley of Corazones, now Ures, Sonora, and from there to attempt contact with the fleet of Hernando de Alarcón, which was to be the maritime arm of Coronado's expedition. In September 1540, he began his third expedition, traveling overland to the head of the Gulf of California. Near the confluence of what is now the Colorado and Gila Rivers he learned from the natives that Alarcon had departed, but had left a cache of supplies and correspondence, which he located. The message basically stated that

Francisco de Alarcón reached this place in the year '40 with three ships, having been sent in search of Francisco Vazquez Coronado by the viceroy, D. Antonio de Mendoza; and after crossing the bar at the mouth of the river and waiting many days without obtaining any news, he was obliged to depart, because the ships were being eaten by worms.

Díaz crossed the Colorado River, becoming the first European to do so, and named it Rio del Tizon ("River of Embers" or "Firebrand River") from the practice of the natives for keeping themselves warm. He was impressed with the physical strength of the natives of the area. He explored for four days west of the Colorado, perhaps as far as the Imperial Valley.

== Death and legacy ==
While on this expedition (reports vary, some saying it ended further exploration, others saying it occurred while on the return) Díaz accidentally suffered a mortal wound. He threw a lance at a dog that was attacking their sheep. The lance stuck into the ground and before he could stop, Díaz's momentum impaled his groin on the back end of the lance. He lingered for twenty days but died en route in January 1541. The rest of the expedition arrived on 18 January 1541, in San Jeronimo de los Corazones, Sonora.

Because of his untimely death, we do not have the kind of memoirs commonly written by other Spanish explorers. The reports that he made in the course of his expeditions, however, were quite detailed and contributed much to the knowledge of the area and the times for both contemporary and later readers. His name for the Colorado River was the accepted name for almost two centuries. He reported details of Native American culture. He discovered and reported geothermal hot springs, probably the ones near Calexico.
