= Hernando de Alarcón =

Spanish conquistador (1500–1541)

Personal details
- Born: Hernando de Alarcón c. 1500 Trujillo, Castile
- Died: 1541 Alta California
- Occupation: Conquistador
- Known for: First European to see and perhaps step in the state of California

Military service
- Allegiance: Spain
- Rank: Captain
- Battles/wars: Spanish conquest of Mexico

California Historical Landmark
- Designated: 1957
- Reference no.: 568

Hernando de Alarcón (born c. 1500) was a Spanish explorer and navigator of the 16th century, noted for having led a 1540 expedition to the Colorado River Delta, during which he became one of the first Europeans to ascend the Colorado River from its mouth and became the first European to see Alta California.

Little is known about Alarcón's life outside of his exploits in New Spain. He was probably born in the town of Trujillo, in present-day Extremadura, Spain, around 1500 and travelled to the Americas as a young man. In New Spain he served Viceroy Antonio de Mendoza for a time as chamberlain.

== 1540 expedition ==
By 1540, Mexico had been conquered and state-sponsored expeditions were being sent north in search of new wealth and the existence of a water passage between the Atlantic and Pacific oceans. Viceroy of New Spain Antonio de Mendoza commissioned Francisco Vázquez de Coronado to undertake a massive overland expedition to find the Seven Cities of Cibola, which were rumoured to exist in the unexplored northern interior. The expedition was to be resupplied with stores and provisions delivered by ships traveling north up the Sea of Cortés (Gulf of California), the commander of which would be Alarcón.

Alarcón set sail from the Pacific port of Acapulco with two ships, the San Pedro and the Santa Catalina, on May 9, 1540, and was later joined by the San Gabriel at St. Jago de Buena Esperanza (modern-day Manzanillo, Colima). His orders from Mendoza were to await the arrival of Coronado's land expedition at a certain latitude along the coast. The meeting with Coronado was never effected, though Alarcón reached the appointed place and left letters, which were soon afterward discovered by Melchor Díaz, another explorer.

Alarcón eventually sailed to the northern terminus of the Gulf of California and completed the explorations begun by Francisco de Ulloa the preceding year. During this voyage Alarcón proved to his satisfaction that no open-water passage existed between the Gulf of California and the Pacific Ocean (then called the "South Sea"). Subsequently, on September 26, he entered the mouth of the Colorado River, which he named the Buena Guía ("good guide"). He was the first European to ascend the river for a distance considerable enough to make important observations. On a second voyage, he probably proceeded past the present-day site of Yuma, Arizona. A map drawn by one of Alarcón's pilots is the earliest accurately detailed representation of the Gulf of California and the lower course of the Colorado River.

Alarcón wrote of his contact with the Yuma-speaking Indians along Colorado. The information he compiled consisted of their practices in warfare, religion, curing, and even sexual customs.

== California Historical Landmark ==
California Historical Landmark No. 568, on the west bank of the Colorado River near Andrade in Imperial County, California, commemorates Alarcón's expedition and notes they were the first non-Indians to sight land within the present-day state of California. The marker reads:

NO. 568 HERNANDO DE ALARCÓN EXPEDITION - Alarcón's mission was to provide supplies for Francisco Coronado's expedition in search of the fabled Seven Cities of Cibola. The Spaniards led by Hernando de Alarcón ascended the Colorado River by boat from the Gulf of California past this point, thereby becoming the first non-Indians to sight Alta California on September 5, 1540.

== See also ==
- California Historical Landmarks in Imperial County
- Spanish missions in Arizona
- Spanish missions in the Sonoran Desert
- Spanish missions in Baja California
- California Historical Landmark

== Bibliography ==
- Elsasser, Albert B. (1979). "Explorations of Hernando Alarcon in the Lower Colorado River Region, 1540". Journal of California and Great Basin Anthropology. 1 (1). ISSN 0191-3557.
- González Hernández, Cristina (2022). "Hernando de Alarcón". Real Academia de la Historia (in Spanish).
- Hammond, George P. & al., ed. Narratives of the Coronado Expedition, 1540–1542. University of New Mexico Press: Albuquerque, New Mexico. 1940.
- Holmes, Maurice G. (1963). From New Spain by Sea to the Californias, 1519-1668. A.H. Clark Co.
- Howgego, Raymond John, ed. (2003). "Alarcon, Hernando de". Encyclopedia of Exploration to 1800. Hordern House. ISBN 1875567364.
- Wagner, Henry R.; de Ulloa, Francisco (1924). "California Voyages, 1539-1541: The Voyage of Francisco de Ulloa; The Voyage of Hernando de Alarcon; The Voyage of Francisco de Bolaños". California Historical Society Quarterly. 3 (4): 307–397. doi:10.2307/25613647. ISSN 0008-1175.
