= Coronado Exposition Commission Act of 1939 =

- Other short titles: Coronado Cuatro Centennial Commission, 1939
- Long title: An Act authorizing Federal participation in the commemoration and observance of the four-hundredth anniversary of the explorations of Francisco Vasquez de Coronado.
- Nicknames: United States Coronado Exposition Commission, 1939
- Enacted by: the 76th United States Congress
- Effective: July 17, 1939

Citations
- Public law: Pub. L. 76–186
- Statutes at Large: 53 Stat. 1047, Chap. 314

Legislative history
- Introduced in the Senate as S. 2197; Signed into law by President Franklin D. Roosevelt on July 17, 1939

Coronado Exposition Commission Act of 1939 or United States Coronado Exposition Commission, 1939 is a United States statute establishing a federal exposition commission for national observance purposes. The commission provided representation of the United States by a commemoration and observance as related to the entrada of North America by Francisco Vázquez de Coronado in 1540. The commemorative exposition was a 400th anniversary regarding the exploration of the States of Arizona, Colorado, Kansas, New Mexico, Oklahoma, and Texas reasonably considering the Age of Discovery by the Spanish Empire's conquistadors.

The United States public law authorized the erection of a monument as stated in section five of the United States statute. The monument was to be located nearest the international boundary between the United States and Mexico where the Coronado expedition first crossed into modern day North America. The monument was established on August 18, 1941, as the Coronado International Memorial ― Coronado National Memorial ― located within the vicinity of Sierra Vista, Arizona.

The act of Congress was authored as House bill 6852 and Senate bill 2197. The S. 2197 legislation was passed by the 76th United States Congress and enacted into law by Franklin Roosevelt on July 17, 1939.

== See also ==
- George P. Hammond
- Herbert Eugene Bolton
- Spanish Borderlands

== Congressional Acts for Coronado Exposition and National Memorial ==
U.S. Statutes for Coronado Exposition and National Memorial

Date of enactment	Public Law No.	U.S. Citation	U.S. Bill No.	U.S. Presidential Administration
June 11, 1940	P.L. 76-587	54 Stat. 263	H.R. 9595	Franklin D. Roosevelt
August 18, 1941	P.L. 77-216	55 Stat. 630	S. 752	Franklin D. Roosevelt
July 9, 1952	P.L. 82-478	66 Stat. 510	S. 2909	Harry S. Truman

== Antiques and art of 1540–1940 Coronado Cuarto Centennial ==
- "1940 Coronado Cuarto Centennial Historic Trails New Mexico Map & Brochure". Internet Archive. Johnson Printing Inc.
- "1940 Map of New Mexico – Coronado Cuarto Centennial 1540-1940". Worthopedia. WorthPoint Corporation.
- "1940 New Mexico Brochure Coronado Cuarto Centennial". Worthopedia. WorthPoint Corporation.
- "1940 New Mexico Coronado Cuarto Centennial License Plate 1540-1940". Worthopedia. WorthPoint Corporation.
- "1940 New Mexico Coronado Cuarto Centennial Historic Trails Pictorial Map". Internet Archive. Bradford Robinson PTG Co.
- "1940 New Mexico License Plate, Coronado Cuarto Centennial 1540-1940". Worthopedia. WorthPoint Corporation.
- "1940 Vintage Felt Pennant Coronado Cuarto Centennial 1540-1940". Worthopedia. WorthPoint Corporation.

== Bibliography ==
- Winship, George Parker (1896). "The Coronado Expedition, 1540–1542". Internet Archive. Washington, D.C.: United States Government Printing Office. pp. 1–637. OCLC 565571935.
- Richman, Irving Berdine; Bolton, Herbert Eugene (1919). "Adventurers of New Spain, Part 1: The Spanish Conquerors ~ Part 2: The Spanish Borderlands". HathiTrust Digital Library. New Haven, Connecticut: Yale University Press. OCLC 337589.
- Hammond, George P. (1940). "Coronado's Seven Cities". HathiTrust Digital Library. Albuquerque, New Mexico: United States Coronado Exposition Commission. pp. 1–82. hdl:2027/mdp.39015024850227. OCLC 2651957.
- Stevens, Thomas Wood (1940). The Entrada of Coronado: A Spectacular Historic Drama. Albuquerque, New Mexico: Coronado Cuarto Centennial Commission. pp. 1–135. OCLC 3891496.
- Writers' Program of the Work Projects Administration in the State of New Mexico (August 1940). "New Mexico: a Guide to the Colorful State". HathiTrust Digital Library. American Guide Series. Albuquerque, New Mexico: University of New Mexico Press. pp. 1–458. OCLC 11512536.
- "Coronado Cuarto Centennial Publications, 1540-1940". HathiTrust Digital Library. Coronado Historical Series. Albuquerque, New Mexico: Coronado Cuarto Centennial Commission.
- Kendall, M. Sue (October 1986). "Gold's Fool and God's Country: The Coronado Craze of 1940–1941". Prospects. 11. Cambridge University Press: 311–323. doi:10.1017/S0361233300005421.
