= Francisco Vázquez de Coronado =

Spanish explorer of the American southwest

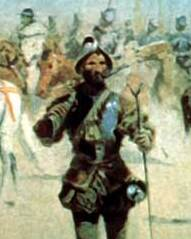
- Painting by Frederic Remington, c. 1900

Governor of New Galicia
- Monarch: Charles I

Personal details
- Born: 1510 Salamanca, Crown of Castile
- Died: 22 September 1554 (aged 43–44) Mexico City, Viceroyalty of New Spain
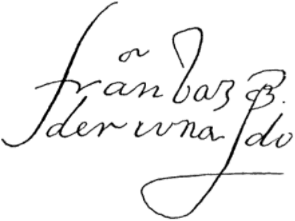
- Signature

Military service
- Allegiance: Spain
- Years of service: 1535–1554
- Battles/wars: Spanish conquest of Mexico; Exploration of North America

Francisco Vázquez de Coronado (Spanish pronunciation: [fɾanˈθisko ˈβaθkeθ ðe koɾoˈnaðo]; 1510 – 22 September 1554) was a Spanish conquistador and explorer who led a large expedition from what is now Mexico to present-day Kansas through what is now parts of the southwestern United States between 1540 and 1542. Vázquez de Coronado had hoped to reach the Cities of Cíbola, often referred to now as the mythical Seven Cities of Gold. His expedition marked the first European sightings of the Grand Canyon and the Colorado River, among other landmarks. His name is often Anglicized as Vasquez de Coronado or just Coronado.

== Early life ==
Vázquez de Coronado was born into a noble family in Salamanca, Spain, in 1510 as the second son of Juan Vázquez de Coronado and Isabel de Luján. Juan Vázquez held various positions in the administration of the recently captured Emirate of Granada under Íñigo López de Mendoza, its first Christian governor.

Francisco Vázquez de Coronado went to New Spain (present-day Mexico) in 1535 at about age 25, in the entourage of its first Viceroy, Antonio de Mendoza, the son of his father's patron and Vázquez de Coronado's personal friend. In New Spain, he married twelve-year-old Beatriz de Estrada, called "the Saint" (la Santa), sister of Leonor de Estrada, ancestor of the de Alvarado family and daughter of Treasurer and Governor Alonso de Estrada y Hidalgo, Lord of Picón, and his wife Marina Flores Gutiérrez de la Caballería, from a converso Jewish family. Vázquez de Coronado inherited a large portion of a Mexican encomendero estate through Beatriz and had eight children with her.

== Expedition ==
=== Preparation ===
Vázquez de Coronado was the Governor of the Kingdom of Nueva Galicia (New Galicia), a province of New Spain located northwest of Mexico and comprising the modern Mexican states of Jalisco, Sinaloa and Nayarit. In 1539, he dispatched Friar Marcos de Niza and Estevanico (more properly known as Estevan), one of only four survivors of the Narváez expedition, on an expedition north from Compostela toward present-day New Mexico. When de Niza returned, he told of a city of vast wealth, a golden city called Cíbola, whose Zuni residents were assumed to have murdered Estevan. Though he did not claim to have entered the city of Cíbola, he mentioned that it stood on a high hill and that it appeared wealthy and as large as Mexico City.

Vázquez de Coronado assembled an expedition with two components. One component carried the bulk of the expedition's supplies, traveling via the Guadalupe River and Gulf of California under the leadership of Hernando de Alarcón. The other component traveled by land, along the trail on which Friar Marcos de Niza had followed Esteban. Vázquez de Coronado and Viceroy Antonio de Mendoza invested large sums of their own money in the venture. Mendoza appointed Vázquez de Coronado the commander of the expedition, with the mission to find the mythical Seven Cities of Gold. This is the reason he pawned his wife's estates and was lent 70,000 pesos.

In the autumn of 1539, Mendoza ordered Melchior Díaz, commander of the Spanish outpost at San Miguel de Culiacán, to investigate Friar de Niza's findings, and on November 17, 1539, Díaz departed for Cíbola with fifteen horsemen. At the ruins of Chichilticalli, he turned around because of "snows and fierce winds from across the wilderness". Díaz had encountered Vázquez de Coronado before he had departed San Miguel de Culiacán, and reported that initial investigations into Friar de Niza's report disproved the existence of the bountiful land he had described. Díaz's report was delivered to Viceroy Mendoza on March 20, 1540.

=== Expedition ===
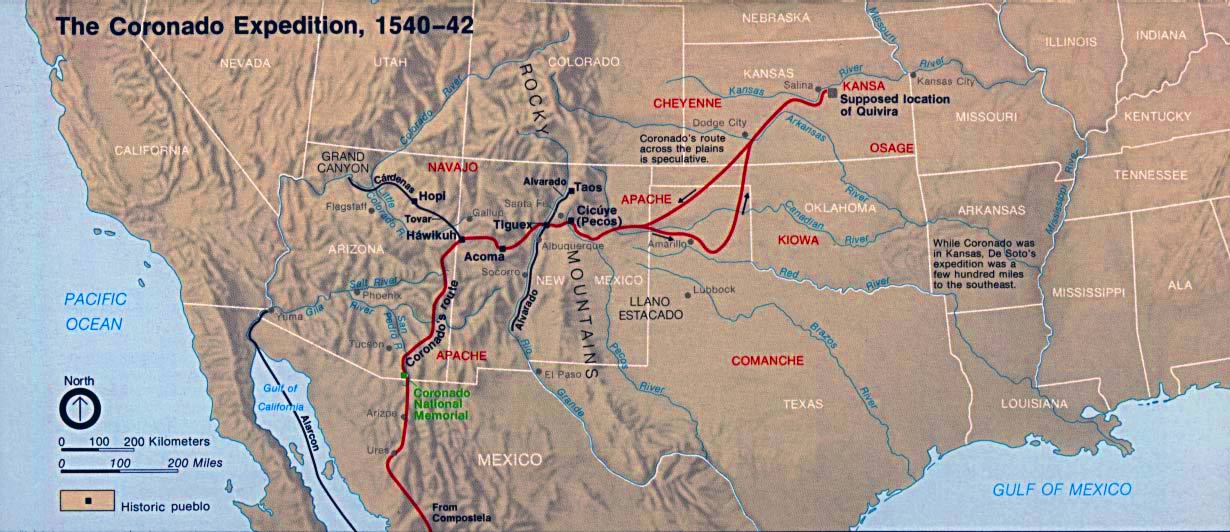
The Coronado Expedition (1540–1542) from Mexico north through the future U.S. states of Arizona, New Mexico, Texas, Oklahoma, and Kansas.

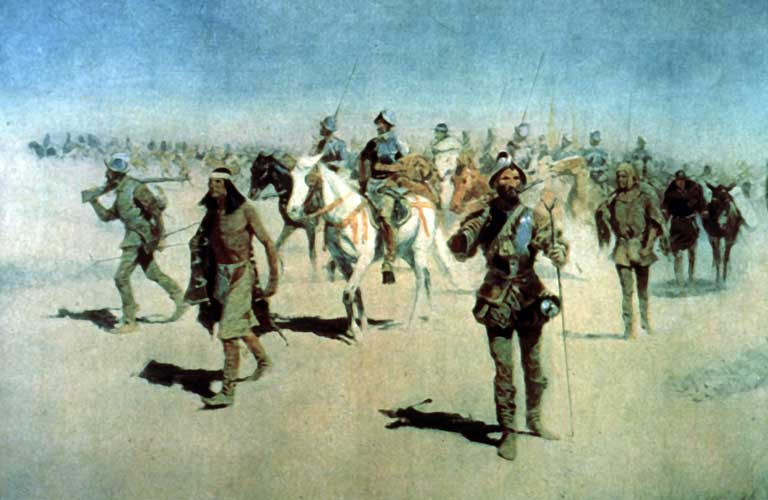
Coronado Sets Out to the North (Frederic Remington, c. 1900)

Vázquez de Coronado set out from Compostela on February 23, 1540, at the head of a much larger expedition composed of about 400 European men-at-arms (mostly Spaniards), 1,300 to 2,000 Mexican Indian allies, four Franciscan friars (the most notable of whom were Juan de Padilla and the newly appointed provincial superior of the Franciscan order in the New World, Marcos de Niza), and several slaves, both natives and Africans. Many other family members and servants also joined the party.

He followed the Sinaloan coast northward, keeping the Gulf of California on his left to the west until he reached the northernmost Spanish settlement in Mexico, San Miguel de Culiacán, about March 28, 1540, whereupon he rested his expedition before they began trekking the inland trail. Aside from his mission to verify Friar de Niza's report, Melchior Díaz had also taken notice of the forage and food situation along the trail, and reported that the land along the route would not be able to support a large concentrated body of soldiers and animals. Vázquez de Coronado, therefore, decided to divide his expedition into small groups and time their departures so that grazing lands and water holes along the trail could recover. At intervals along the trail, Vázquez de Coronado established camps and stationed garrisons of soldiers to keep the supply route open. For example, in September 1540, Melchior Díaz, along with "seventy or eighty of the weakest and least reliable men" in Vázquez de Coronado's army, remained at the town of San Jerónimo, in the valley of Corazones (Spanish for "Hearts"). Once the scouting and planning was done, Vázquez de Coronado led the first group of soldiers up the trail. They were horsemen and foot soldiers who were able to travel quickly, while the main bulk of the expedition would set out later.

After leaving Culiacán on April 22, 1540, Vázquez de Coronado followed the coast, "bearing off to the left", as Mota Padilla says, by an extremely rough way, to the Sinaloa River. The configuration of the country made it necessary to follow the river valley until he could find a passage across the mountains to the course of the Yaqui River. He traveled alongside this stream for some distance, then crossed to the Rio Sonora, which he followed nearly to its source before a pass (now known as Montezuma Pass) was discovered. On the southern side of the Huachuca Mountains he found a stream he called the Nexpa, which may have been either the Santa Cruz or the San Pedro in modern Arizona of modern maps, most likely the northward-flowing San Pedro River. The party followed this river valley until they reached the edge of the wilderness, where, as Friar Marcos had described it to them, they found Chichilticalli. Chichilticalli is in southern Arizona in the Sulphur Springs Valley, within the bend of the Dos Cabezas and Chiricahua Mountains. This fits the chronicle of Laus Deo description, which reports that "at Chichilticalli the country changes its character again and the spiky vegetation ceases. The reason is that ... the mountain chain changes its direction at the same time that the coast does. Here they had to cross and pass the mountains in order to get into the level country." There Vázquez de Coronado met a crushing disappointment: Cíbola was nothing like the great golden city that de Niza had described. Instead, it was just a village of nondescript pueblos constructed by the Zuni. The soldiers were upset with de Niza for his mendacious imagination, so Vázquez de Coronado sent him back south to New Spain in disgrace.

Despite what is shown in the accompanying map, on-the-ground research by Nugent Brasher beginning in 2005 revealed evidence that Vázquez de Coronado traveled north between Chichilticalli and Zuni primarily on the future New Mexico side of the state line, not the Arizona side as has been thought by historians since the 1940s. Also, most scholars believe Quivira was about thirty miles east of the great bend of the Arkansas River, ending about twenty miles west-southwest of the location depicted on the map, with Quivira being mostly on tributaries of the Arkansas River instead of directly on the Kansas River. For details, see § Location of Quivira, Tabas, and Harahey below.

==== Conquest of Cíbola ====
The Coronado Expedition, 1540–1542 (DjVu format)

Vázquez de Coronado traveled north on one side or the other of today's Arizona–New Mexico state line, and from the headwaters of the Little Colorado River, he continued on until he came to the Zuni River. He followed the river until he entered the territory controlled by the Zuni. The members of the expedition were almost starving and demanded entrance into the community of Hawikuh (of which the preferred Zuni word is Hawikku). The residents refused, denying the expedition entrance to the community. Vázquez de Coronado and his expeditionaries attacked the Zunis. The ensuing skirmish constituted the extent of what can be called the Spanish Conquest of Cíbola. He never personally led his men-at-arms in any subsequent battles. During the battle, Vázquez de Coronado was injured. During the weeks that the expedition stayed at Zuni, he sent out several scouting expeditions.

The first scouting expedition was led by Pedro de Tovar. This expedition headed northwest to the Hopi communities they recorded as Tusayan. Upon arrival, the Spanish were also denied entrance to the village that they came across and, once again, resorted to using force to enter. Materially, Hopi territory was just as poor as that of the Zuni in precious metals, but the Spaniards did learn that a large river (the Colorado) lay to the west.

==== Exploration of the Colorado River ====
Three leaders affiliated with the Vázquez de Coronado expedition were able to reach the Colorado River. The first was Hernando de Alarcón, then Melchior Díaz and lastly García López de Cárdenas. Alarcón's fleet was tasked to carry supplies and to establish contact with the main body of Vázquez de Coronado's expedition but was unable to do so because of the extreme distance to Cibola. He traveled up the Sea of Cortés and then the Colorado River. In this exploration, he hauled some supplies for Vázquez de Coronado, but eventually, he buried them with a note in a bottle. Melchior Díaz was sent down from Cíbola by Vázquez de Coronado to take charge of the camp of Corazones and to establish contact with the fleet. Soon after arriving at the camp he set out from the valley of Corazones in Sonora and traveled overland in a north/northwesterly direction until he arrived at the junction of the Colorado River and Gila River. There, indigenous informants, probably the Cocomaricopa (see Seymour 2007b), told him that Alarcón's sailors had buried supplies and left a note in a bottle. The supplies were retrieved, and the note stated that Alarcón's men had rowed up the river as far as they could, searching in vain for the Vázquez de Coronado expedition. They had given up and decided to return to their departure point because worms were eating holes in their boats. Díaz named the river the "Firebrand (Tizón) River" because the indigenous people of the area used firebrands to keep their bodies warm in the winter. Díaz died on the trip back to the camp in the valley of the Corazones.

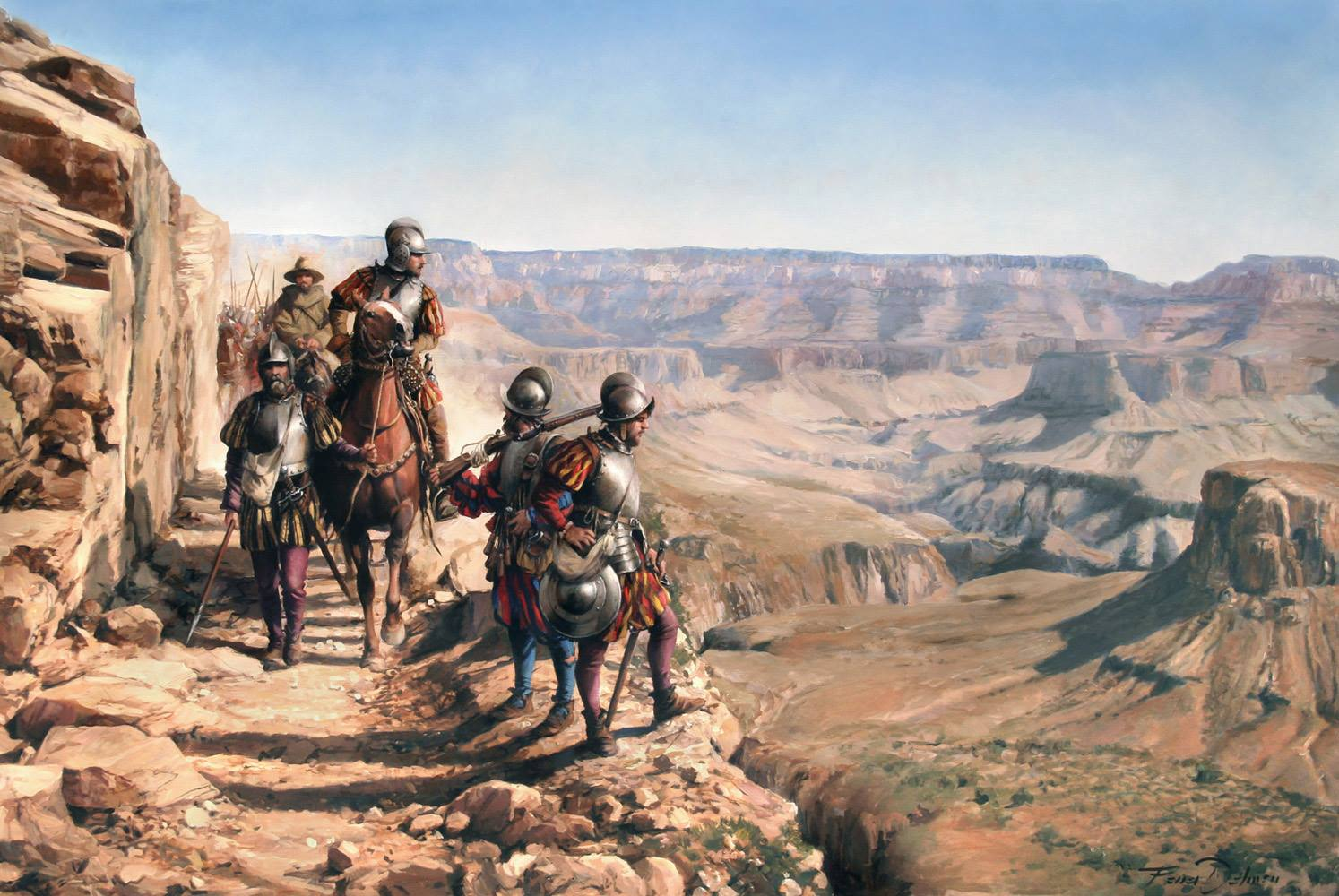
La conquista del Colorado, by Augusto Ferrer-Dalmau, depicts Coronado's 1540–1542 expedition. García López de Cárdenas can be seen overlooking the Grand Canyon.

While at Hawikuh, Vázquez de Coronado sent another scouting expedition overland to find the Colorado River, led by Don García López de Cárdenas. The expedition returned to Hopi territory to acquire scouts and supplies. Members of Cárdenas's party eventually reached the South Rim of the Grand Canyon, where they could see the Colorado River thousands of feet below, becoming the first non-Native Americans to do so. After trying and failing to climb down into the canyon to reach the river, the expedition reported that they would not be able to use the Colorado River to link up with Hernando de Alarcón's fleet. After this, the main body of the expedition began its journey to the next populated center of pueblos, along another large river to the east, the Rio Grande in New Mexico.

==== Tiguex War ====
Hernando de Alvarado was sent to the east, and found several villages around the Rio Grande. Vázquez de Coronado had one commandeered for his winter quarters, Coofor, which is across the river from present-day Bernalillo near Albuquerque, New Mexico. During the winter of 1540–41, his army found themselves in conflict with the Rio Grande natives, which led to the brutal Tiguex War. This war resulted in the destruction of the Tiguex pueblos and the deaths of hundreds of Native Americans. The Spaniards also captured a Wichita woman, Big Eyes, who had been enslaved by the Tiguex, and who would become a guide for the expedition.

==== Search for Quivira ====
From an indigenous informant the Spanish called "The Turk" (el turco), Vázquez de Coronado heard of a wealthy nation called Quivira far to the east. In spring 1541, he led his army and priests and indigenous allies onto the Great Plains to search for Quivira. The Turk was probably either Wichita or Pawnee and his intention seems to have been to lead Vázquez de Coronado astray and hope that he got lost in the Great Plains. Alternately, it is possible that the Turk was leading Coronado to the large mound-building kingdoms of the southeast.

With the Turk guiding him, Vázquez de Coronado and his army might have crossed the flat and featureless steppe called the Llano Estacado in the Texas Panhandle and Eastern New Mexico, passing through the present-day communities of Hereford and Canadian. The Spanish were awed by the Llano. "The country they [the buffalo] traveled over was so smooth that if one looked at them the sky could be seen between their legs." Men and horses became lost in the featureless plain and Vázquez de Coronado felt like he had been swallowed up by the sea.

On the Llano, Vázquez de Coronado encountered vast herds of bison—the American buffalo. "I found such a quantity of cows ... that it is impossible to number them, for while I was journeying through these plains ... there was not a day that I lost sight of them."

==== Querechos and Teyas ====
Vázquez de Coronado found a community of people he called Querechos. The Querechos were not awed or impressed by the Spanish, their weapons, and their "big dogs" (horses). "They did nothing unusual when they saw our army, except to come out of their tents to look at us, after which they came to talk to the advance guard, and asked who we were." As Vázquez de Coronado described them, the Querechos were nomads, following the buffalo herds on the plains. The Querechos were numerous. Chroniclers mentioned one settlement of two hundred tipis—which implies a population of more than one thousand people living together for at least part of the year. Authorities agree that the Querechos (Becquerel's) were Apache Indians.

Vázquez de Coronado left the Querechos behind and continued southeast in the direction in which the Turk told him that Quivira was located. He and his army descended off the tabletop of the Llano Estacado into the caprock canyon country. He soon met with another group of Indians, the Teyas, enemies of the Querechos.

The Teyas, like the Querechos, were numerous and buffalo hunters, although they had additional resources. The canyons they inhabited had trees and flowing streams and they grew or foraged for beans, but not corn. The Spanish, however, did note the presence of mulberries, roses, grapes, walnuts, and plums.

An intriguing event was Vázquez de Coronado's meeting among the Teyas an old blind bearded man who said that he had met many days before "four others like us". He was probably talking about Cabeza de Vaca, who with Esteban and two other Spanish survivors of the Narváez expedition to Florida made his way across southern Texas six years before Vázquez de Coronado.

Scholars differ in their opinions as to which historical Indian group were the Teyas. A plurality believe they were Caddoan speakers and related to the Wichita. The place where Vázquez de Coronado found the Teyas has also been debated. The mystery may have been cleared up—to the satisfaction of some—by the discovery of a likely Vázquez de Coronado campsite. While Vázquez de Coronado was in the canyon country, his army suffered one of the violent climatic events so common on the plains. "A tempest came up one afternoon with a very high wind and hail ... The hail broke many tents and tattered many helmets, and wounded many of the horses, and broke all the crockery of the army, and the gourds which was no small loss."

In 1993, Jimmy Owens found crossbow points in Blanco Canyon in Crosby County, Texas, near the town of Floydada in Floyd County. Archaeologists subsequently searched the site and found pottery sherds, more than forty crossbow points, and dozens of horseshoe nails of Spanish manufacture, plus a Mexican-style stone blade. This find strengthens the evidence that Vázquez de Coronado found the Teyas in Blanco Canyon.

==== Quivira ====
Another guide, probably Pawnee and named Ysopete, and probably Teyas as well told Vázquez de Coronado that he was going in the wrong direction, saying Quivira lay to the north. By this time, Vázquez de Coronado seems to have lost his confidence that fortune awaited him. He sent most of his expedition back to New Mexico and continued with only forty Spanish soldiers and priests and an unknown number of Indian soldiers, servants, and guides. Vázquez de Coronado, thus, dedicated himself to a reconnaissance rather than a mission of conquest.

After more than thirty days journey, Vázquez de Coronado found a river larger than any he had seen before. This was the Arkansas, probably a few miles east of present-day Dodge City, Kansas. The Spaniards and their Indian allies followed the Arkansas northeast for three days and found Quivirans hunting buffalo. The Indians greeted the Spanish with wonderment and fear but calmed down when one of Vázquez de Coronado's guides addressed them in their own language.

Vázquez de Coronado reached Quivira itself after a few more days of traveling, on July 29, 1541. He found Quivira "well settled ... along good river bottoms, although without much water, and good streams which flow into another". Vázquez de Coronado believed that there were twenty-five settlements in Quivira. Both men and women Quivirans were nearly naked. Vázquez de Coronado was impressed with the size of the Quivirans and all the other Indians he met. They were "large people of very good build". Vázquez de Coronado spent twenty-five days among the Quivirans trying to learn of richer kingdoms just over the horizon. He found nothing but straw-thatched villages of up to two hundred houses and fields containing corn, beans, and squash. A copper pendant was the only evidence of wealth he discovered. The Quivirans were almost certainly the ancestors of the Wichita people.

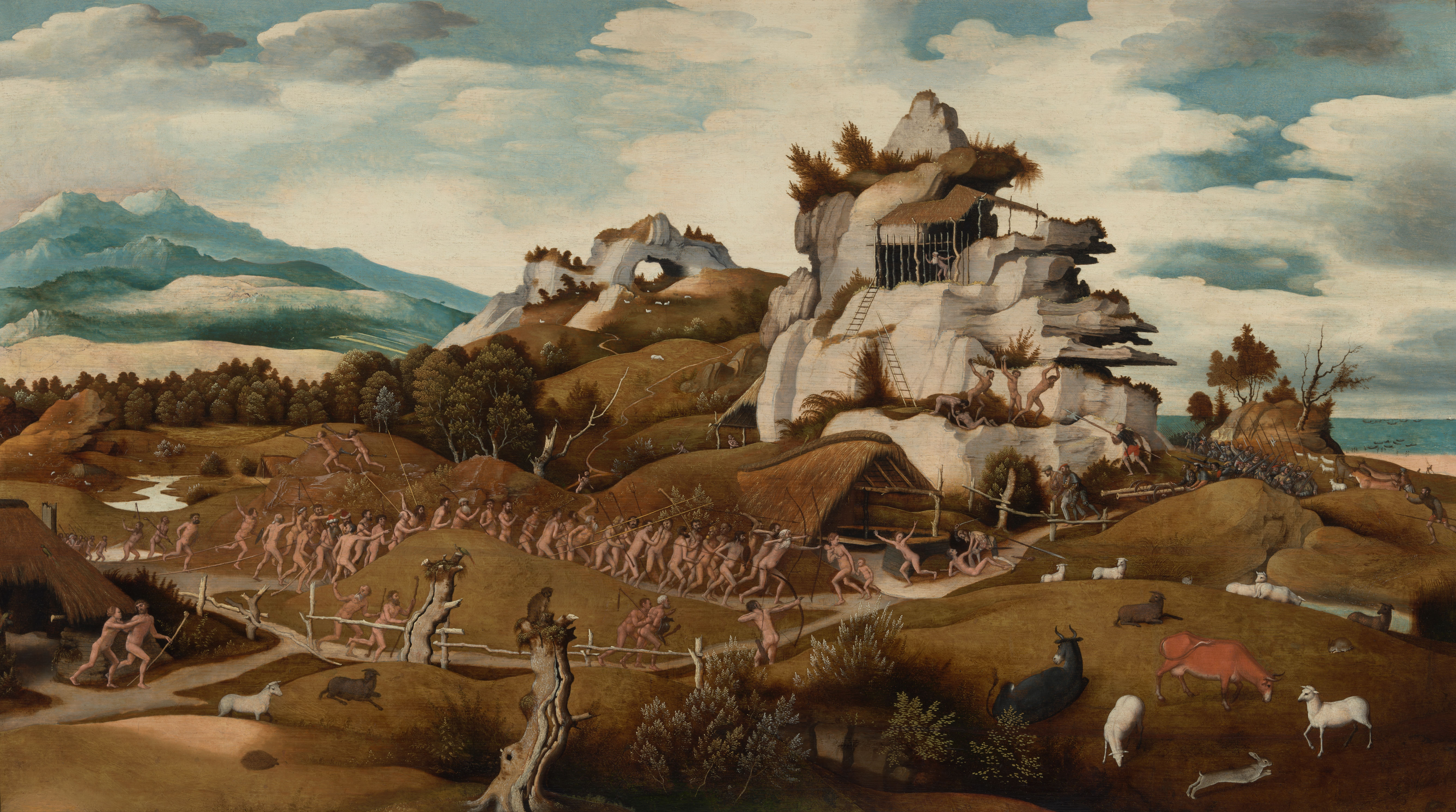
Episode from the Conquest of America by Jan Mostaert (c. 1545), probably Vázquez de Coronado in New Mexico

Vázquez de Coronado was escorted to the further edge of Quivira, called Tabas, where the neighboring land of Harahey began. He summoned the "Lord of Harahey" who, with two hundred followers, came to meet with the Spanish. He was disappointed. The Harahey Indians were "all naked – with bows, and some sort of things on their heads, and their privy parts slightly covered". They were not the wealthy people Vázquez de Coronado sought. Disappointed, he returned to New Mexico. Before leaving Quivira, Vázquez de Coronado ordered the Turk garroted (executed). The Turk is regarded as an Indian hero in a display at Albuquerque's Indian Pueblo Cultural Center because his disinformation led Vázquez de Coronado onto the Great Plains and thus relieved the beleaguered pueblos of Spanish depredations for at least a few months.

=== Location of Quivira, Tabas, and Harahey ===
Archaeological evidence suggests that Quivira was in central Kansas with the westernmost village near the small town of Lyons on Cow Creek, extending twenty miles east to the Little Arkansas River, and north another twenty miles to the town of Lindsborg on a tributary of the Smoky Hill River. Tabas was likely on the Smoky Hill River. Archaeologists have found numerous 16th-century sites in these areas that probably include some of the settlements visited by Vázquez de Coronado.

At Harahey "was a river, with more water and more inhabitants than the other". This sounds as if Vázquez de Coronado may have reached the Smoky Hill River near Salina or Abilene. It is a larger river than either Cow Creek or the Little Arkansas and is located at roughly the 25 league distance from Lyons that Vázquez de Coronado said he traveled in Quivira. The people of Harahey seem Caddoan, because "it was the same sort of a place, with settlements like these, and of about the same size" as Quivira. They were probably the ancestors of the Pawnee.

=== Expedition end ===
Vázquez de Coronado returned to the Tiguex Province in New Mexico from Quivira and was badly injured in a fall from his horse "after the winter was over", according to the chronicler Castañeda—probably in March 1542. During a long convalescence, he and his expeditionaries decided to return to New Spain (Mexico). Vázquez de Coronado and his expedition departed New Mexico in early April 1542, leaving behind two friars. His expedition had been a failure. Although he remained governor of Nueva Galicia until 1544, the expedition forced him into bankruptcy and resulted in charges of war crimes being brought against him and his field master, Cárdenas. Vázquez de Coronado was cleared by his friends on the Audiencia, but Cárdenas was convicted in Spain of basically the same charges by the Council of the Indies. Vázquez de Coronado remained in Mexico City, where he died of an infectious disease on September 22, 1554. He was buried under the altar of the Church of Santo Domingo in Mexico City.

== Family ==
Within a year of arriving in New Spain, he married Beatriz de Estrada, called "the saint".

Beatriz was the second daughter of Alonso de Estrada and Marina de la Caballería; niece of Diego de Caballeria. The Estrada-Coronado union was a carefully calculated political union that Francisco and Marina orchestrated. Through this marriage, Francisco became a wealthy man. Beatriz brought to the marriage the encomienda of Tlapa, the third largest encomienda in New Spain. This marriage was an important source of funding for Francisco's expedition.

Beatriz and Francisco have been reported, through different sources, to have had at least four sons (Gerónimo, Salvador, Juan, and Alonso) and five daughters (Isabel, María, Luisa, Mariana, and Mayor).

After her husband's death, Beatriz ensured that three of their daughters were married into prominent families of New Spain. She never remarried.

Beatriz reported that her husband had died in great poverty, since their encomiendas had been taken away from them due to the New Laws, and that she and her daughters lived in misery too, a shame for the widow of a conqueror that had provided such valuable service to his majesty. This, as most reports from the early days of New Spain, both positive and negative and regarding all things, have been proven to be false, part of the power struggles among settlers and attempts to exploit the budding new system that tried to find a way to administer justice in land the king could not see nor the army reach. Francisco, Beatriz and their children actually ended their days comfortably.

== Commemoration ==
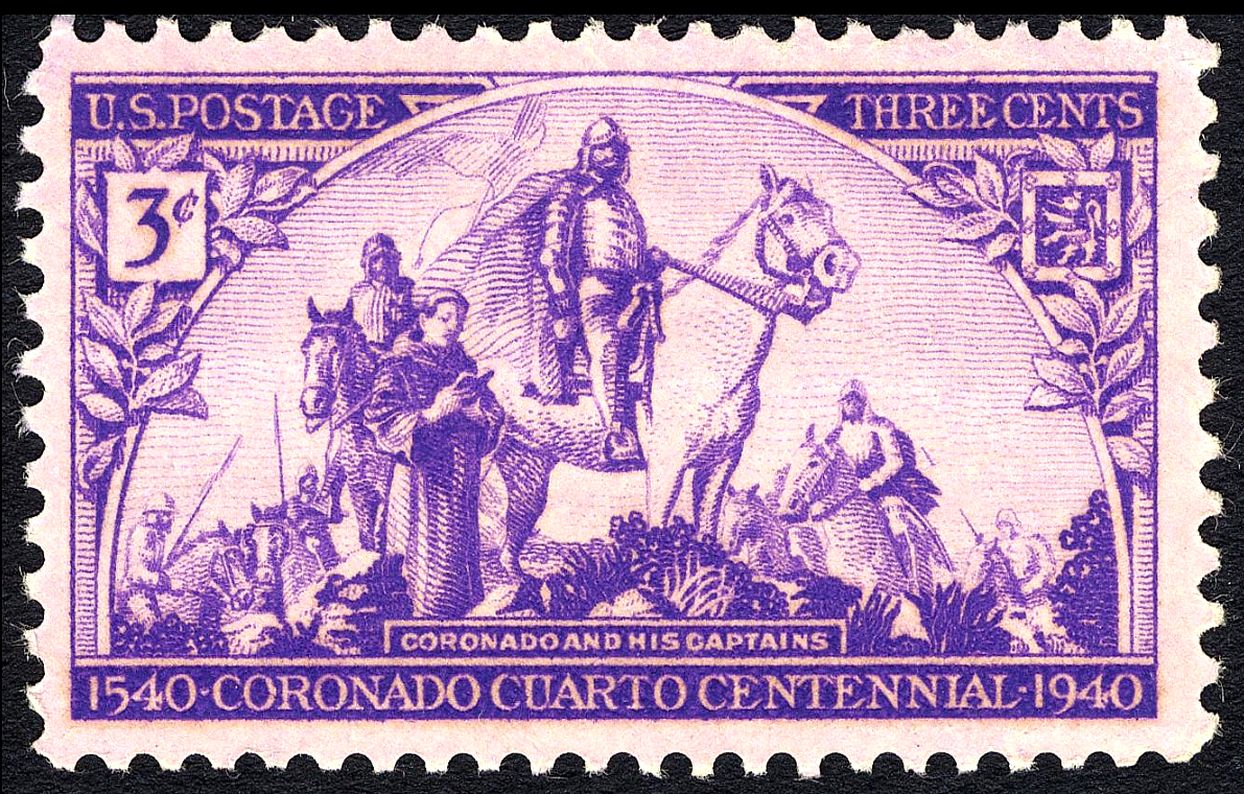
In 1940 the U.S. Post Office issued a commemorative stamp celebrating the 400th anniversary of the Coronado expedition

In 1939, United States 76th Congress passes the Coronado Exposition Commission Act of 1939 authorizing the erection of a monument at the nearest point of the international boundary between the United States and Mexico where the Coronado expedition first crossed into North America.

In 1952, the United States established Coronado National Memorial near Sierra Vista, Arizona to commemorate his expedition. The nearby Coronado National Forest is also named in his honor.

In 1908, Coronado Butte, a summit in the Grand Canyon, was officially named to commemorate him.

A large hill northwest of Lindsborg, Kansas, is called Coronado Heights.

Coronado High Schools in Lubbock, Texas; El Paso, Texas; Colorado Springs, Colorado; and Scottsdale, Arizona, were named for Vázquez de Coronado.

Coronado Road in Phoenix, Arizona, was named after Vázquez de Coronado. Similarly, Interstate 40 through Albuquerque has been named the Coronado Freeway.

Coronado, California is not named after Francisco Vázquez de Coronado, but is named after Coronado Islands, which were named in 1602 by Sebastián Vizcaíno who called them Los Cuatro Coronados (the four crowned ones) to honor four martyrs.

The mineral coronadite is named after him.

== Popular culture ==
Indiana Jones and the Last Crusade references the "Cross of Coronado". According to the film, this gold cross, discovered in a Utah cave system, was given to Vázquez de Coronado by Hernán Cortés in 1521. Such an event never happened because Vázquez de Coronado would have been 11 or 12 years old in 1521 and still living in Spain. In addition, when Indy captures the cross from robbers aboard a ship off the coast of Portugal, the ship can be seen to be named The Coronado.

In the classic young adult novel, The King's Fifth by Scott O'Dell, the main characters, Estéban de Sandoval and Blas de Mendoza, seek Coronado's expedition and temporarily join it. It is there that they meet the third main character, Zia Troyano, a teenage Zuni Native American. Sandoval and Mendoza participate in the battle of Hawikuh (during which Sandoval is wounded) and describe the injury sustained by Coronado during that battle.

The song "Hitchin' to Quivira" from independent singer-songwriter Tyler Jakes's 2016 album Mojo Suicide is based on the story of Vázquez de Coronado's expedition.

The song "Coronado And The Turk" from singer-songwriter Steve Tilston's 1992 album Of Moor And Mesa is based on the story of Vázquez de Coronado's expedition.

The 1995 film Charlie's Ghost: The Secret of Coronado, also known as Charlie's Ghost Story, starring Cheech Marin, follows the story of a young boy who meets the ghost of Coronado and tries to help him by giving his remains a proper burial.|date=October 2026}}-->

== See also ==
- Chamuscado and Rodriguez Expedition
- Antonio de Espejo

== Sources ==
- Winship, George Parker, translator and editor (1990). The Journey of Coronado 1540–1542. Golden, Colorado: Fulcrum. Introduction by Donald C. Cutter. ISBN 1-55591-066-1
