= Hernando de Alvarado =

Spanish conquistador and explorer

Hernando de Alvarado (d. 1540s), was a Spanish conquistador and explorer, lieutenant under Francisco Vázquez de Coronado and artillery officer in his army. In fall of 1540, shortly ahead of Tiguex War, he led a small exploratory military unit into the American Southwest, visiting several pueblos:

- August 29, 1540 — Acoma Pueblo
- Taos Pueblo
- Cicuye
