= Pedro de Tovar =

Spanish explorer, military man and colonial administrator

- Born: 1501
- Died: after 1563
- Occupations: Military man, explorer and colonial administrator

Pedro de Tovar (born 1501) was a Spanish explorer, military man and colonial administrator. He was part of Francisco Vazquez de Coronado's expedition and led the first expedition to Cibola in 1540. Tovar was also the first European to hear about the existence of the Grand Canyon, although he did not get to see it. He was also a member of Nuño Beltrán de Guzmán's troops during the conquest of Nueva Galicia, as well as collaborating in the colonization of Guadalajara and the foundation of Culiacán, in modern Mexico. After that, he was alcalde of Nueva Galicia and Culiacán.

== Biography ==
Tovar was born in 1501, in a family of hidalgos belonging to the House of Boca de Huergano. Tovar was brother of Sancho de Tovar and nephew of the Viceroy of New Spain and Peru Antonio de Mendoza y Pacheco. During his career, he achieved the position of regidor of Sahagún, in León, Spain.

In 1531, he was part of the troops of Nuño Beltrán de Guzmán, with whom he conquered Nueva Galicia and founded Culiacán, in Sinaloa. He also participated in the colonization of Guadalajara, in Jalisco, in modern Mexico, being one of its first colonists.

Tovar joined Coronado's expedition in 1541 and assumed the titles of captain and alferez mayor (ensign) of the expedition.

Coronado's troop searched for the Seven Cities of Cibola. Initially, they thought that the cities were in the Hawikuh territory, one of the Zuni tribes, in New Mexico. However, the Hawikuh opposed the Spanish entry into their lands, so both groups clashed. The Coronado's troop defeated them, so the Zuni made a peace treaty with them. However, the Spaniards did not find the gold they were looking for.

A week later, Coronado sent Tovar and his troop westward in search of Cibola. During their journey, Tovar's team reached the lands of the Hopi Amerindians in Arizona. However, just like the Zuni, the Hopi did not allow them to enter their lands and the Spanish had to fight them. During the confrontation some Hopi died, so they surrendered and allowed him to visit their lands. The natives provided them with gifts in peace, as well as accepted to develop a trade with Tovar's troop.

Although the Hopi were unaware of the existence of Cibolo and their lands were scarce in wealth, Tovar heard about the presence of a great river (The Colorado) to the west of them, which captured his attention. Not having been able to find Cibola, Tovar returned to Hawikuh and spoke with Coronado about the presence of the river near the Hopi lands.

In 1542 Tovar returned to Culiacan, the place he helped to found, and there he lived the rest of his life. He acquired two encomiendas near the aforementioned province. The first one employed a thousand men and the other four hundred. The workers of his encomiendas, as was usual in Spanish America, had to obey him and pay him tribute. At the end of the 1540s, Tovar took over Anacatarimeto's encomienda and later also got the one in Mocorito's, in Sinaloa. According to Historian Richard Flint, Tovar was alcalde mayor of Nueva Galicia in 1549 and of Culiacán in 1564.

== Personal life ==
Tovar married Francisca de Guzmán, daughter of a governor of Cuba. His grandson, Hernándo de Tovar, was a priest.

== Legacy ==
- Tovar is credited as being the first white person to be seen by the Hopi.
- El Tovar, a hotel built in 1905 in Arizona's Grand Canyon's South Rim, was named after him.
