= Tyler Jakes =

American songwriter

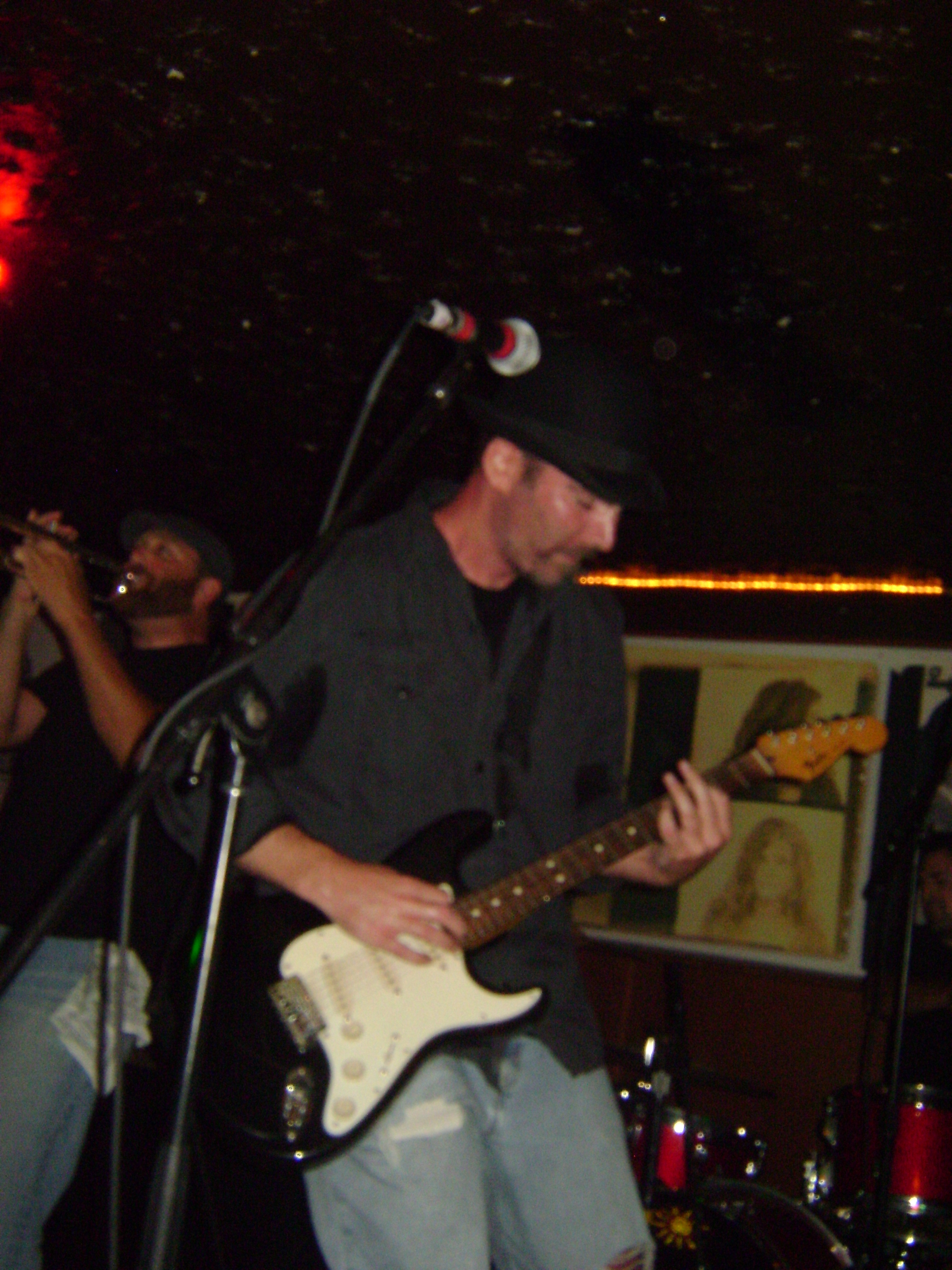
- Tyler Jakes & The Bootleggers performing live in Portland, Oregon – August 2009

Background information
- Origin: Minneapolis, Minnesota, United States
- Genres: Garage rock, blues rock, punk blues, alternative rock, outlaw country
- Occupations: Singer-songwriter, musician, composer, producer
- Instruments: Vocals, guitar, bass, drums, harmonica, piano, keyboard
- Years active: 2005–present
- Website: tylerjakes.com

Tyler Jakes is an American musician, songwriter, and producer. His sound blends elements of rock and roll, blues, punk, outlaw country, gypsy folk, and surf music.

When Tyler Jakes' first album, Lo-Fi Matter, was released in late 2005, Pulse of the Twin Cities drew comparisons as broad as Bob Dylan and BRMC saying that, "Jakes is intent on laying down some truly dirty rock and roll here...Lo-Fi Matter is a great starting point". Rift Magazine added, "On Lo-Fi Matter, Jakes displays great range and talent as a song writer". The first track on Lo-Fi Matter, "Lie Awake", was used during the opening credits to the short film "Under The N", with Jakes also performing the film's score.

Jakes moved from his home of Minneapolis, Minnesota, to San Francisco, in early 2008 and formed Tyler Jakes & The Bootleggers. The band featured Jakes on vocals and guitar, Nick Payne on drums, Corey Fiala on acoustic guitar and bass, Clint Taxdahl on trumpet and guitar, Matthew Whitemyer on guitar and bass, Dominic Henri on bass, and Zach LeWinter on drums and percussion. Shortly thereafter, the Emmy award-winning Discovery Channel program Deadliest Catch featured the song "Gamblers Off The North Pacific Shore", a song Jakes had written and recorded specifically for the show. In May 2008, Jakes released his second album, Rocking Hoarse Calypso.

Tyler Jakes & The Bootleggers spent the remainder of 2008 and 2009 performing on a regular basis in the San Francisco bay area, as well as touring the west coast. Highlights included shows opening up for Th' Legendary Shack Shakers, performing at the Baxtalo Drom Festival, and playing the Bob Dylan after-party at Blakes on Telegraph in Berkeley, CA.

On November 4, 2010, Jakes released his third album, Burning Down The Underground. Jakes recorded the album primarily at his home studio in San Francisco, with bandmate, Matthew Whitemyer, co-engineering. The Music Cycle wrote, "Burning Down The Underground stays true to the deep bluesy rock sound that has come to garner Jakes such critical acclaim. At the same time, however, Jakes continues to push the boundaries of sound and genre creating unique and interesting fusions of music".

When Jakes is not touring, he is recording his work. He releases his tracks in albums. These albums are available in three formats: Phonograph record, Compact disc, and MP3, via Jakes' Official website. Also, Jakes' music is available on Pandora Radio in the United States.

== Discography ==
- Lo-Fi Matter, 2005
- Rocking Hoarse Calypso, 2008
- Burning Down The Underground, 2010
- Evil, 2013
- On The Bones, 2014
- Mojo Suicide, 2016
- Yer Witches Burn, 2016
- Dissolution, 2017
- Dopamine, 2020
- Rock N' Roll Pariah, 2020
- Lower Than Lo-Fi: The '05 Demo Tape, 2020
- Tequila Marijuana Sextura Rock N Roll, 2021
- The Devil Card, 2021
- Off The Track (EP), 2022
- Reprobate Cantata, 2023
- Super Maximum, 2026

== TV/film appearances ==
- Under The N (2008) Track: "Lie Awake"
- Deadliest Catch, episode 46 "Mortal Men" – Discovery Channel (2008) Track: "Gamblers Off The North Pacific Shore"
