= List of South European Jews =

Jews had lived in South Europe for two thousand years. The Jewish presence in Italy, Spain, and Portugal dates to the Roman period and has continued until the present.

== Italy ==
=== Political figures ===
- Alessandro d'Ancona (1835–1914), Senator and mayor of Pisa (1906–1907)
- Graziadio Isaia Ascoli (1829–1907), linguist and Senator (1886–1890)
- Luca Barbareschi (born 1956), actor, director and former member of the Chamber of Deputies (2008–2013)
- Emanuele Fiano (born 1963), member of the Chamber of Deputies since 2006
- Giovanni Cantoni (1818–1897), physicist, member of the Chamber of Deputies (1867–1874) and Senator (1876–1880)
- Furio Colombo (born 1931), journalist, member of the Chamber of Deputies (1996–2001, 2008–2013) and Senator (2006–2008)
- Luigi Cremona (1830–1903), mathematician, Senator (1879–1903) and Minister of Public Education (1898–1899)
- Giuliano Ferrara (born 1952), Minister for Parliamentary Relations (1994–1995), member of European Parliament (1989–1994), journalist and founder of Il Foglio
- Aldo Finzi (1891–1944), fascist member of the Chamber of Deputies (1921–1929)
- Giuseppe Finzi (1815–1886), patriot and Senator (1860–1886)
- Vittorio Foa (1910–2008), socialist trade unionist
- Alessandro Fortis (1842–1909), Italian Prime Minister (1905–1906)
- Augusto Graziani (1933–2014), economist and Senator (1992–1994)
- Yoram Gutgeld (born 1959), economist and former member of Chamber of Deputies (2013–2018)
- Anna Kuliscioff (1857–1925), Russian-born revolutionary feminist
- Rita Levi-Montalcini (1909–2012), scientist and Senator (2001–2012)
- David Levi (1816–1898), poet, patriot and Senator (1861–1880)
- Luigi Luzzatti (1841–1927), Italian Prime Minister (1910–1911)
- Ernesto Nathan (1848–1921), mayor of Rome (1907–1913)
- Margherita Sarfatti (1880–1961), journalist and mistress of Benito Mussolini
- Liliana Segre (born 1930), holocaust survivor and Senator for life since 2018
- Sidney Sonnino (1847–1922), Italian prime minister (1906, 1909–1910)
- Umberto Terracini (1895–1983), President of the Constituent Assembly of Italy (1946–1948), Senator (1948–1983)
- Claudio Treves (1869–1933), politician and writer, grandfather of Carlo Levi
- Leone Wollemborg (1859–1932), politician and former Minister of Economy

=== Religious and communal leaders ===
- Samuel Aboab (1610–1694), prominent rabbi
- Aaron ben Gershon abu Al-Rabi or Aronne Abulrabi of Catania (ca. 1400–1450), rabbinic scholar, cabalist and astrologer; called also Aldabi or Alrabi, Aaron was "the first Jew in the history to be invited during a Pontificate to discuss freely and without censorship about religious subjects and papal perplexities; Pope Martin V welcomed him in Rome"
- Barbara Aiello, American-born rabbi active in Italy
- Benjamin Artom (1835–1879), Haham of the Spanish and Portuguese Jews of Great Britain
- Solomon Aviad Sar-Shalom Basilea (ca. 1680–1743), rabbi
- Judah Brieli (1643–1722), rabbi
- Umberto Cassuto (1883–1951), rabbi
- Abraham Isaac Castello (1726–1789), rabbi
- Leone Ebreo (1465–1523), Neoplatonic philosopher
- Amos Luzzatto (1928–2020), writer and former president of the Italian Jewish Communities Union
- Moshe Chaim Luzzatto (1707–1746), rabbi, scholar, mystic, also known as Ramchal
- Samuel David Luzzatto (1800–1865), important rabbi and scholar, also known as Shadal
- Raphael Meldola (1754–1828), rabbi
- David Nieto (1654–1728), rabbi
- Riccardo Pacifici (1904–1943), rabbi, murdered in Auschwitz
- Joseph Pardo (1561–1619), rabbi
- Obadiah ben Jacob Sforno (1475–1550), rabbi, philosopher
- Elio Toaff (1915–2015), rabbi and former Chief of Italian Jews Community
- Isaiah di Trani (ca. 1180–1250), talmudist, rabbi, also known as RID
- Moses David Vali (circa 1697 – December 17, 1776) biblical commentator, physician, scholar, and Kabbalist from Padua.

=== Academics ===
- Pedigree of Azzopardi
- Faraj ben Salim, Sicilian physician and translator from Agrigento
- Mosé Bonavoglia de' Medici, or Bonavoglio de' Medici (died 1447), Sicilian physician from Messina and Dienchelele (Naggid or Dayan kelali = Universal Judge of Sicilian Jews); his Hebrew name was Moses Hefez
- Michele Besso (1873–1955), Swiss-born engineer
- Caecilius of Calacte, Sicilian rhetorician from modern Caronìa
- Laura Capón (1907–1977), physicist
- Enrico Castelnuovo, art historian and medievalist
- Gino Fano (1871–1952), mathematician
- Robert Fano (1917–2016), physicist
- Ugo Fano (1912–2001), physicist
- Carlo Ginzburg (1939–2026), historian
- Giovanni Jona-Lasinio (born 1932), physicist (Jewish father)
- Alberto Jori (born 1965), philosopher (Jewish mother)
- Giorgio Levi Della Vida (1886–1961), linguist specialized in Semitic languages
- Rita Levi-Montalcini (1909–2012), neurologist, Nobel Prize (1986)
- Cesare Lombroso (1835–1909), criminologist
- Salvador Luria (1912–1991), microbiologist, Nobel Prize (1969)
- Samuel David Luzzatto (1800–1865), scholar and poet
- Franco Modigliani (1918–2003), economist, Nobel Prize (1985)
- Arnaldo Momigliano (1908–1987), Italian-born historian
- Bruno Pontecorvo (1913–1993), physicist
- Guido Pontecorvo (1907–1999), geneticist
- Giulio Racah (1909–1965), physicist
- Bruno Rossi (1905–1993), astrophysicist
- Asher Salah (born 1967), historian
- Cesare Segre (1928–2014), linguistics, semiotics
- Emilio Segrè (1905–1989), physicist, Nobel Prize (1959)
- Sforno family
- Piero Sraffa (1898–1983), economist
- Manfredo Tafuri (1935–1994), architectural historian, critic and theorist
- Ariel Toaff (born 1942), historian
- Andrew Viterbi (born 1935), inventor of the Viterbi algorithm
- Bruno Zevi (1918–2000), architectural critic and historian

==== Mathematicians ====
- Emilio Artom (1888–1952), mathematician
- Eugenio Calabi (1923–2023), mathematician
- Guido Castelnuovo (1865–1952), mathematician
- Federigo Enriques (1871–1946), mathematician
- Gino Fano (1871–1952), mathematician
- Guido Fubini (1879–1943), mathematician
- Beppo Levi (1875–1961), mathematician
- Tullio Levi-Civita (1873–1941), mathematician
- Beniamino Segre (1903–1977), mathematician
- Corrado Segre (1863–1924), mathematician
- Vito Volterra (1860–1940), mathematician

=== Musicians ===
- Mario Ancona (1860–1931), baritone
- Abramo Basevi (1818–1885), composer and musician
- Alvise Bassano, musician
- Anthony Bassano, musician
- Baptista Bassano, musician
- Jeronimo Bassano, musician
- Mario Castelnuovo-Tedesco (1895–1968), guitar, classical and synagogal music composer
- Giacobbe Cervetto (1680–1783), cellist and composer
- Lorenzo Da Ponte (born Emanuele Conegliano, 1749–1838), opera librettist (born Jewish, raised Catholic)
- Abramo dall'Arpa (died 1566), harpist
- Abramino dall'Arpa (fl ca. 1577–1593), harpist
- Aldo Finzi (1897–1945), composer
- Obadiah the Proselyte, musician
- Salamone Rossi (ca. 1570–1630), baroque composer
- Victor de Sabata (1892–1967), conductor (Jewish mother)
- Leone Sinigaglia (1868–1944), composer

=== Writers ===
- Devorà Ascarelli, poet and translator
- Giorgio Bassani, author
- Angela Bianchini, fiction writer
- Riccardo Calimani, fiction writer and historian
- Enrico Castelnuovo, father of Guido
- Moses Chayyim Catalan, poet
- Lorenzo Da Ponte (born Emanuele Conegliano), opera librettist (born Jewish, raised Catholic)
- Leonardo de Benedetti, physician and writer
- Manuela Dviri, writer
- Alain Elkann, writer and journalist, father of John, Lapo and Ginevra
- Carlo Ginzburg, historian, writer, essayist and pioneer of microhistory
- Leone Ginzburg, writer (born in Ukraine)
- Natalia Ginzburg (born Levi), author (Jewish father), wife of Leone and mother of Carlo
- Arrigo Levi, writer, journalist and TV anchorman
- Carlo Levi, writer, painter and physician
- Primo Levi, chemist and author
- Carlo Michelstaedter, philosopher
- Lisa Morpurgo Dordoni, writer, astrologer
- Paolo Mieli, journalist, historian and director of Corriere della Sera
- Liana Millu, writer
- Alberto Moravia (born Pincherle), author (Jewish father)
- Laura Orvieto, writer
- Alessandro Piperno, writer
- Umberto Saba, poet (Jewish mother)
- Donato Sacerdote, poet
- Rubino Romeo Salmonì, writer
- Roberto Saviano, writer, journalist (Jewish mother)
- Clara Sereni, writer
- Italo Svevo (born Schmitz), author
- Humbert Wolfe, poet and civil servant
- Aldo Zargani, writer
- Guido Bedarida, writer

=== Artists ===
- Valeria Bruni Tedeschi, actress
- Vito D'Ancona, painter
- Cristiana Capotondi, actress (half Jewish)
- Gioele Dix (b. Davide Ottolenghi), actor and comedian
- Ginevra Elkann, film director, sister of John and Lapo
- Arnoldo Foà, actor
- Massimiliano Fuksas, architect (Jewish father)
- Vittorio Gassman, actor (Jewish mother)
- Alessandro Haber, actor
- Carlo Levi, writer, painter and physician
- Leo Lionni
- Emanuele Luzzati, painter
- Amedeo Modigliani, painter and sculptor
- Ernesto Nathan Rogers, architect, critic and editor
- Moni Ovadia, theatre figure
- Gillo Pontecorvo, director
- Xenia Rappoport, actress
- Bruno Zevi, architect

=== Business ===
- Carlo De Benedetti (born 1934), industrialist, ex-CEO of FIAT, Olivetti, CIR Group, ex-deputy chairman of Banco Ambrosiano and ex-president of Gruppo Editoriale L'Espresso
- John (born 1976) and Lapo Elkann (born 1977), Vice Chairman of Fiat (Jewish father)
- Adriano Goldschmied (born 1944), fashion designer known as the "godfather of denim" who created Diesel, Replay, and AG Adriano Goldschmied; currently directing Goldsign and men's Citizens of Humanity
- Moses Haim Montefiore (1784–1885), financier and philanthropist
- Adriano Olivetti (1901–1960), son of Camillo, industrialist and social activist
- Camillo Olivetti (1868–1943), founder of Olivetti typewriters
- Guy Spier (born 1966), author and investor

=== Other ===
- Eugenio Calò (1906–1944), Jewish partisan awarded the gold medal for military valour, murdered by the Nazis
- Angelo Donati (1885–1960), banker who protected Jews in Southern France during Italian occupation in 1942–43
- Mario Finzi (1913–1945), partisan (murdered in Auschwitz in 1945)
- Camila Giorgi (born 1991), tennis player
- Riccardo Ehrman (1929–2021), journalist
- Gad Lerner (born 1954), TV anchorman and journalist
- Gillo Pontecorvo (1919–2006), filmmaker
- Giorgio Liuzzi (1895–1983), Chief of the Staff of the Italian Army from 1954 to 1959
- Renato Mannheimer (born 1947), pollster, president of IPSO
- Maurizio Molinari (born 1964), journalist and essayist
- Edgardo Mortara (1851–1940), boy kidnapped by Catholic Papal authorities
- Fiamma Nirenstein (born 1945), essayist, journalist and MP for PDL (elected in 2008)
- Enzo Sereni (1905–1944), Zionist and partisan, executed in Dachau concentration camp

== Malta ==
- Ondina Tayar (1912–2004), writer and pharmacist

== See also ==
- Lists of Jews
- List of Iberian Jews
- List of Italian Jews
