= History of the Jews in Europe =

The location of modern-day Europe (dark green)

The history of Jews in Europe spans a period of over two thousand years. Jews, a Semitic-speaking people originating from Judea in the Southern Levant, began migrating from Judea to Europe just before the rise of the Roman Empire (27 BC), although Alexandrian Jews had already migrated to Rome, and some Gentiles had undergone Judaization on a few occasions. A notable early event in the history of the Jews in the Roman Empire was the 63 BC siege of Jerusalem, where Pompey had interfered in the Hasmonean civil war.

Jews have had a significant presence in European cities and countries since the Fall of the Western Roman Empire, including Italy, Spain, Portugal, France, the Netherlands, Germany, Poland, and Russia. In Spain and Portugal in the late fifteenth century, the monarchies forced Jews to either convert to Christianity or leave and they established offices of the Inquisition to enforce Catholic orthodoxy of converted Jews. These actions shattered Jewish life in Iberia and saw mass migration of Sephardic Jews to escape religious persecution. Many resettled in the Netherlands and re-judaized, starting in the late sixteenth and early seventeenth centuries. In the religiously tolerant, Protestant Dutch Republic Amsterdam prospered economically and as a center of Jewish cultural life, the "Dutch Jerusalem". Ashkenazi Jews lived in communities under continuous rabbinic authority. In Europe Jewish communities were largely self-governing autonomous under Christian rulers, usually with restrictions on residence and economic activities. In Poland, from 1264 (from 1569 also in Lithuania as part of the Polish–Lithuanian Commonwealth), under the Statute of Kalisz until the partitions of the Polish–Lithuanian Commonwealth in 1795, Jews were guaranteed legal rights and privileges. The law in Poland after 1264 (in the Polish–Lithuanian Commonwealth in consequence) toward Jews was one of the most inclusive in Europe. The French Revolution removed legal restrictions on Jews, making them full citizens. Napoleon implemented Jewish emancipation as his armies conquered much of Europe. Emancipation often brought more opportunities for Jews and many integrated into larger European society and became more secular rather than remaining in cohesive Jewish communities.

The pre-World War II Jewish population of Europe is estimated to have numbered close to 9.5 million, or 60% of the world's Jewish population. Around 6 million Jews were killed in the Holocaust, which was followed by the emigration of much of the surviving population.

In 2010, the Jewish population of Europe was estimated to number approximately 1.4 million (0.2% of the European population), or 10% of the world's Jewish population. In the 21st century, France has the largest Jewish population in Europe, followed by the United Kingdom, Germany, Russia and Ukraine. Prior to the Holocaust, Poland had the largest Jewish population in Europe, as a percentage of its population. This was followed by Lithuania, Hungary, Latvia and Romania.

== Ancient period ==
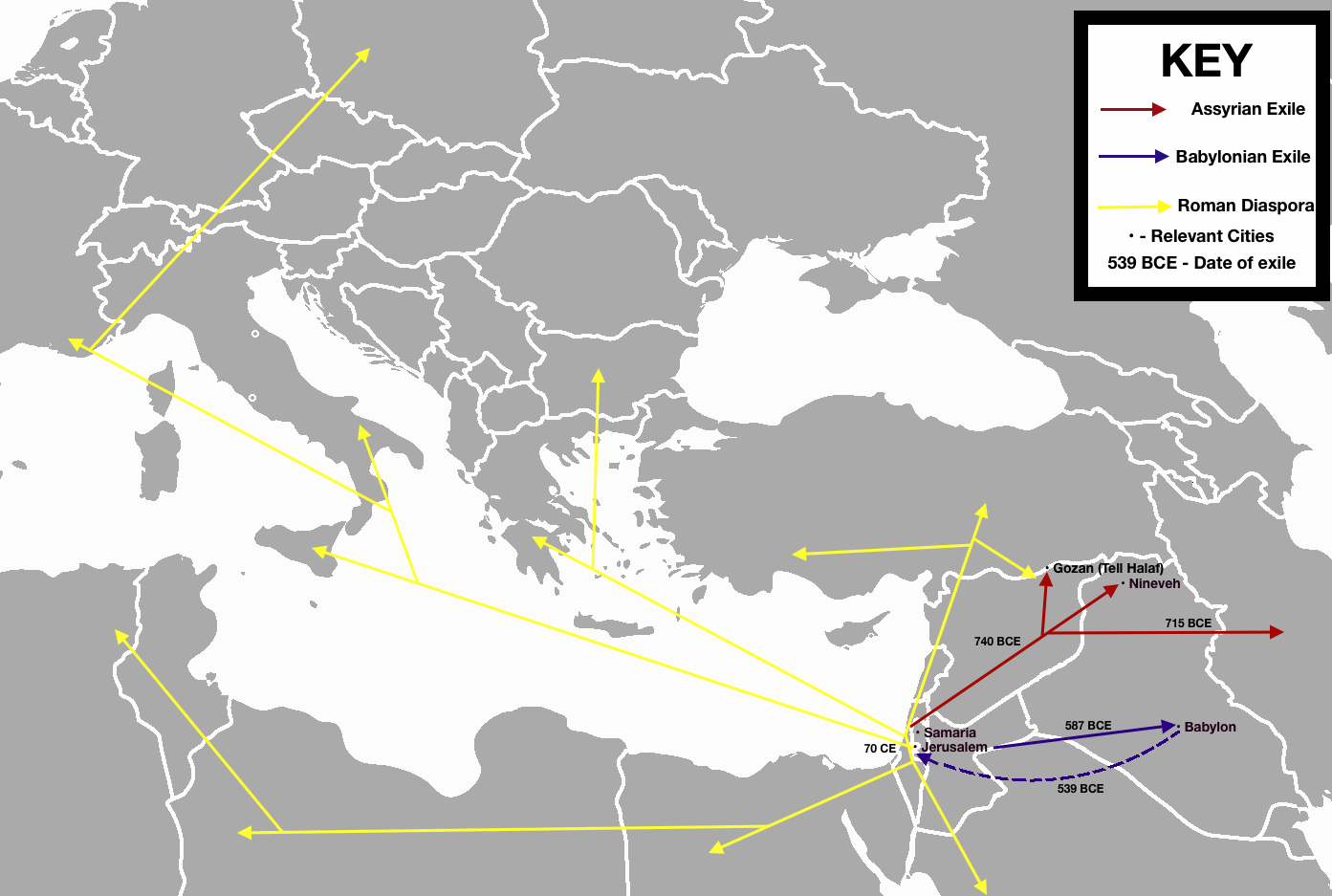
Routes of Jewish ancient expulsion and deportation

Hellenistic Judaism, originating from Alexandria, was present throughout the Roman Empire even before the Jewish–Roman wars. Large numbers of Jews lived in Greece (including the Greek isles in the Aegean and Crete) as early as the beginning of the 3rd century BCE. The first recorded mention of Judaism in Greece dates from 300 to 250 BCE, on the island of Rhodes. In the wake of Alexander the Great's conquests, Jews migrated from the Middle East to Greek settlements in the Eastern Mediterranean, spurred on by the opportunities they expected. As early as the middle of the 2nd century BCE, the Jewish author of the third book of the Oracula Sibyllina, addressing the "chosen people", says: "Every land is full of thee and every sea." The most diverse witnesses, such as Strabo, Philo, Seneca, Cicero, and Josephus, all mention Jewish populations in the cities of the Mediterranean Basin. Most Jewish population centers of this period were, however, still in the Levant, and Alexandria in Egypt was by far the most important of the Jewish communities, with the Jews in Philo's time inhabiting two of the five sections of the city. Nevertheless, a Jewish community is recorded to have existed in Rome at least since the 1st century BCE, although there may even have been an established community there as early as the second century BCE, for in the year 139 BCE, the praetor Hispanus issued a decree expelling all Jews who were not Roman citizens.

At the commencement of the reign of Caesar Augustus in 27 BCE, there were over 7,000 Jews in Rome: this is the number that escorted the envoys who came to demand the deposition of Archelaus. The Jewish historian Josephus confirms that as early as 90 CE there were two Israelite tribes living in Europe, Judah and Benjamin. Thus, he writes in his Antiquities: " ...there are but two tribes in Asia Minor and Europe subject to the Romans, while the ten tribes are beyond Euphrates till now and are an immense multitude." According to E. Mary Smallwood, the appearance of Jewish settlements in southern Europe during the Roman era was probably mostly a result of migration due to commercial opportunities, writing that "no date or origin can be assigned to the numerous settlements eventually known in the west, and some may have been founded as a result of the dispersal of Judean Jews after the revolts of CE 66–70 and 132–135, but it is reasonable to conjecture that many, such as the settlement in Pozzuoli attested in 4 BCE, went back to the late republic or early empire and originated in voluntary emigration and the lure of trade and commerce."

Many Jews migrated to Rome from Alexandria as a result of the close trade relations between the two cities. When the Romans captured Jerusalem in 63 BCE, thousands of Jewish prisoners of war were brought from Judea to Rome, where they were sold into slavery. Following the capture of Jerusalem by the forces of Herod the Great with assistance from Roman forces in 37 BCE, it is likely that Jews were again taken to Rome as slaves. It is known that Jewish war captives were sold into slavery after the suppression of a minor Jewish revolt in 53 BCE, and some were probably taken to southern Europe. After the enslaved Jews gained their freedom, they permanently settled in Rome on the right bank of the Tiber as traders, and some immigrated north later.

Despite their geographic dispersal, the diaspora Jews maintained ties with the Land of Israel, embarking on pilgrimages and making voluntary donations to the Temple via the half-shekel tax. Following the destruction of the Temple in 70 CE, this internal contribution was replaced by the fiscus Judaicus, a coerced Roman tax redirected toward the construction and maintenance of the Temple of Jupiter Optimus Maximus in Rome. Separately, they also sent charitable contributions to the Nesi'im in Israel, in accordance with Roman law, until the late fourth century as Byzantine leadership reversed course.

The Roman Empire period presence of Jews in modern-day Croatia dates to the 2nd century, in Pannonia to the 3rd to 4th century. A finger ring with a menorah depiction found in Augusta Raurica (Kaiseraugst, Switzerland) in 2001 attests to Jewish presence in Germania Superior. Evidence in towns north of the Loire or in southern Gaul date to the 5th century and 6th centuries. By late antiquity, Jewish communities were found in modern-day France and Germany. In the Taman Peninsula, modern day Russia, Jewish presence dates back to the first century. Evidence of Jewish presence in Phanagoria includes tombstones with carved images of the menorah and inscriptions with references to the synagogue.

Persecution of Jews in Europe begins with the presence of Jews in regions that later became known as the lands of Latin Christendom (c. 8th century CE) and modern Europe. Not only were Jewish Christians persecuted according to the New Testament, but also as a matter of historical fact. Anti-Jewish pogroms occurred not only in Jerusalem (325 CE), Persia (351 CE), Carthage (250 CE), Alexandria (415), but also in Italy (224 CE), Milan (379 CE) and Menorca (418 CE), Antioch (489), Daphne-Antioch (506), Ravenna (519), amongst other places. Hostility between Christians and Jews grew over the generations under Roman sovereignty and beyond; eventually forced conversion, confiscation of propertly, burning of synagogues, expulsion, stake burning, enslavement and outlawing of Jews—even whole Jewish communities—occurred countless times in the lands of Latin Christendom.

== Middle Ages ==
Expulsions of Jews in Europe from 1100 to 1600

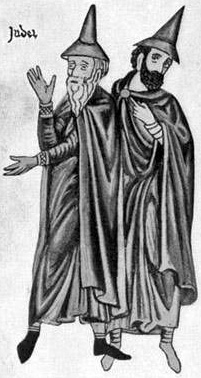
Jews of Germany, 13th century

The early medieval period was a time of flourishing Jewish culture. Jewish and Christian life evolved in "diametrically opposite directions" during the final centuries of the Roman Empire. Jewish life became autonomous, decentralized, community-centered. Christian life became a hierarchical system under the supreme authority of the Pope and the Roman Emperor.

Jewish life can be characterized as democratic. Rabbis in the Talmud interpreted Deut. 29:9, "your heads, your tribes, your elders, and your officers, even all the men of Israel" and "Although I have appointed for you heads, elders, and officers, you are all equal before me" (Tanhuma) to stress political shared power. Shared power entailed responsibilities: "you are all responsible for one another. If there be only one righteous man among you, you will all profit from his merits, and not you alone, but the entire world...But if one of you sins, the whole generation will suffer."

=== Early Middle Ages ===
In the Early Middle Ages, persecution of Jews also continued in the lands of Latin Christendom. After the Visigoths converted from more tolerant non-trinitarian Arianism to the stricter trinitarian Nicene Christianity of Rome, in 612 and again in 642, expulsions of all Jews were decreed in the Visigoth Empire. The Catholic Merovingian dynasty decreed forced conversion for Jews in 582 and 629. Under the Roman Catholic Archdiocese of Toledo, multiple persecutions (633, 653, 693) and stake burnings of Jews (638) occurred; the Kingdom of Toledo followed up on this tradition in 1368, 1391, 1449, and 1486–1490, including forced conversions and mass murder, and there was rioting and a blood bath against the Jews of Toledo in 1212. Jewish pogroms occurred in the Diocese of Clement (France, 554) and in the Diocese of Uzes (France, 561).

European Jews were at first concentrated largely in southern Europe. During the High and Late Middle Ages, they migrated north. There is historical evidence of Jewish communities north of the Alps and Pyrenees in the 8th and 9th centuries. By the 11th century, Jewish settlers from southern Europe, Jewish immigrants from Babylon and Persia, and Maghrebi Jewish traders from North Africa were settling in western and central Europe, particularly in France and along the Rhine River. This Jewish migration was motivated by economic opportunities and often at the invitation of local Christian rulers, who perceived the Jews as having the know-how and capacity to jump-start the economy, improve revenue, and enlarge trade.

Religious and cultural ties to the Levant persisted in this period. In the ninth through eleventh centuries, diaspora Jews from Europe embarked on pilgrimages to Jerusalem for the holiday of Sukkot and attended the annual Mount of Olives Hoshana Rabbah ceremony.

=== High Middle Ages ===
Persecution of Jews in Europe increased in the High Middle Ages in the context of the Christian Crusades. In the First Crusade (1096), flourishing communities on the Rhine and the Danube were utterly destroyed; see German Crusade, 1096. In the Second Crusade, (1147) the Jews in France were subject to frequent massacres. The Jews were also subjected to attacks by the Shepherds' Crusades of 1251 and 1320. The Crusades were followed by expulsions, including in 1290 the banishing of all Jews from the Kingdom of England by King Edward I with the Edict of Expulsion. In 1394, 100,000 Jews were expelled from France. Thousands more were deported from Austria in 1421. Many of the expelled Jews fled to Poland. Many Jews were also expelled from Spain after the Alhambra Decree in 1492.

In relations with Christian society, they were protected by kings, princes and bishops, because of the crucial services they provided in three areas: finance, administration, and medicine. Christian scholars interested in the Bible would consult with Talmudic rabbis. All of this changed with the reforms and strengthening of the Roman Catholic Church and the rise of competitive middle-class, town dwelling Christians. By 1300, the friars and local priests were using the Passion Plays at Easter time, which depicted Jews, in contemporary dress, killing Christ, to teach the general populace to hate and murder Jews. It was at this point that persecution and exile became endemic. As a result of persecution, expulsions and massacres carried out by the Crusaders, Jews gradually migrated to Central and Eastern Europe, settling in Poland, Lithuania, and Russia, where they found greater security and a renewal of prosperity.

=== Late Middle Ages ===
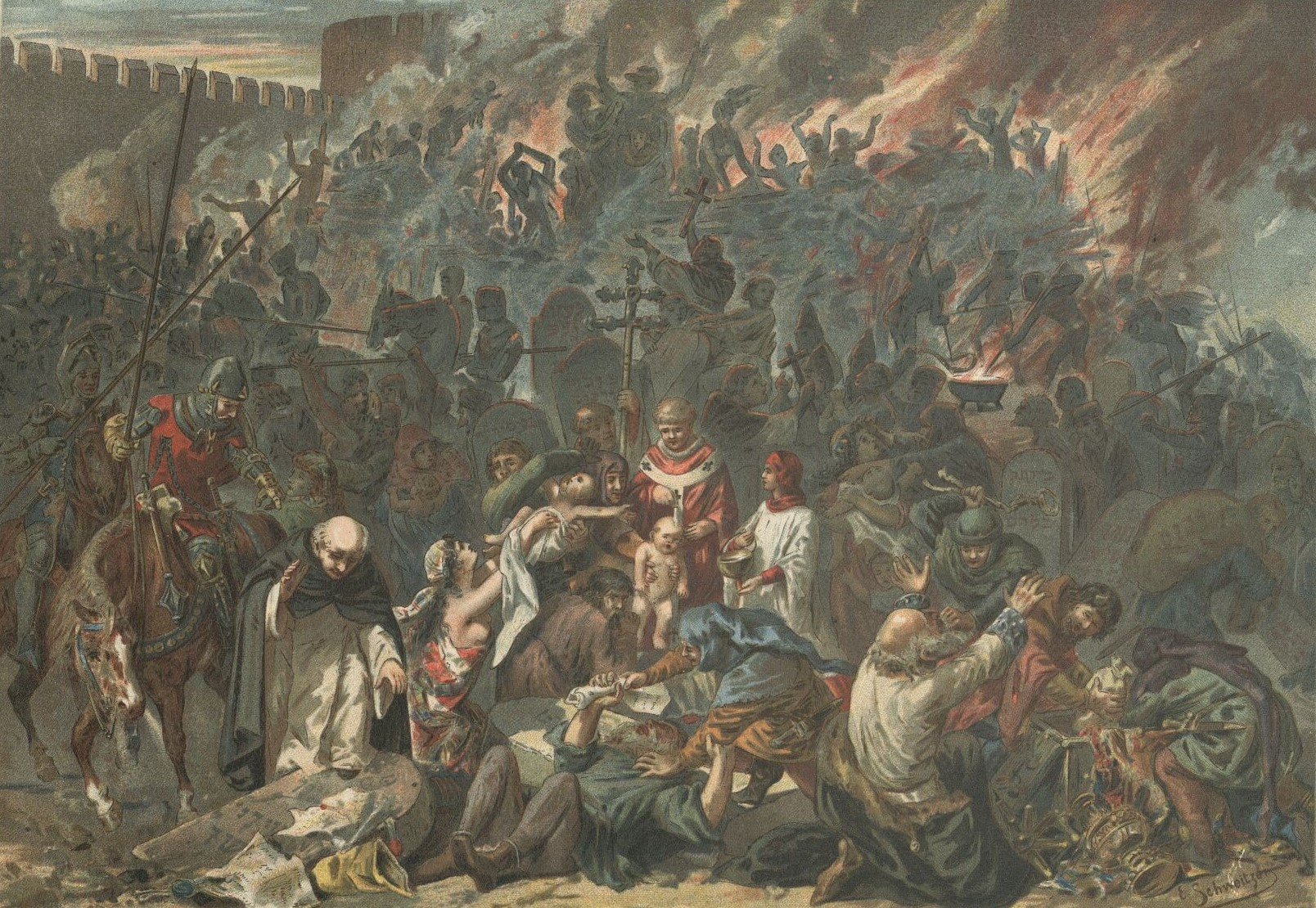
Pogrom of Strasbourg by Emile Schweitzer

In the Late Middle Ages, in the mid-14th century, the Black Death epidemics devastated Europe, annihilating 30–50 percent of the population. It is an oft-told myth that due to better nutrition and greater cleanliness, Jews were not infected in similar numbers; Jews were indeed infected in numbers similar to their non-Jewish neighbors Yet they were still made scapegoats. Rumors spread that Jews caused the disease by deliberately poisoning wells. Hundreds of Jewish communities were destroyed by violence. Although Pope Clement VI tried to protect them with his 6 July 1348 papal bull and another papal bull in 1348, several months later, 900 Jews were burnt alive in Strasbourg, where the plague had not yet reached the city. Christian accusations of host desecration and blood libels were made against Jews. Pogroms followed, and the destruction of Jewish communities yielded the funds for many Pilgrimage churches or chapels throughout the Middle Ages (e.g. Saint Werner's Chapels of Bacharach, Oberwesel, Womrath; Deggendorfer Gnad in Bavaria).

Jewish survival in the face of external pressures from the Roman Catholic empire and the Persian Zoroastrian empire is seen as 'enigmatic' by historians.

Salo Wittmayer Baron credits Jewish survival to eight factors:

1. Messianic faith: Belief in an ultimately positive outcome and restoration to them of the Land of Israel.
2. The doctrine of the World-to-Come increasingly elaborated: Jews were reconciled to suffering in this world, which helped them resist outside temptations to convert.
3. Suffering was given meaning through hope-inducing interpretation of their history and their destiny.
4. The doctrine of martyrdom and inescapability of persecution transformed it into a source of communal solidarity.
5. Jewish daily life was very satisfying. Jews lived among Jews. In practice, in a lifetime, individuals encountered overt persecution only on a few dramatic occasions. Jews mostly lived under discrimination that affected everyone, and to which they were habituated. Daily life was governed by a multiplicity of ritual requirements, so that each Jew was constantly aware of God throughout the day. "For the most part, he found this all-encompassing Jewish way of life so eminently satisfactory that he was prepared to sacrifice himself...for the preservation of its fundamentals." Those commandments for which Jews had sacrificed their lives, such as defying idolatry, not eating pork, observing circumcision, were the ones most strictly adhered to.
6. The corporate development and segregationist policies of the late Roman empire and Persian empire, helped keep Jewish community organization strong.
7. Talmud provided an extremely effective force to sustain Jewish ethics, law and culture, judicial and social welfare system, universal education, regulation of strong family life and religious life from birth to death.
8. The concentration of Jewish masses within 'the lower middle class', with the middle class virtues of sexual self-control. There was a moderate path between asceticism and licentiousness. Marriage was considered to be the foundation of ethnic, and ethical, life.

Outside hostility only helped cement Jewish unity and internal strength and commitment.

=== Jews in Iberia under Islamic rule ===
The Golden age of Jewish culture in Spain refers to a period of history during the Muslim rule of Iberia in which Jews were generally accepted in society and Jewish religious, cultural and economic life blossomed. This "Golden Age" is variously dated from the 8th to 12th centuries.

Al-Andalus was a key center of Jewish life during the Middle Ages, producing important scholars and one of the most stable and wealthy Jewish communities. A number of famous Jewish philosophers and scholars flourished during this time, most notably Maimonides.

== Early modern period ==
The early modern period was one of considerable transition in European Jewry, with forced expulsions and religious persecution in many Christian kingdoms, but there were significant political and cultural changes that saw more favorable conditions for Jewish populations. One in particular, the Protestant Dutch Republic was founded with religious tolerance as a core value, such that Jews could practice their religion openly and generally without restriction and there were opportunities for Jewish merchants to compete on an equal basis in a burgeoning world economy. Culturally, there were changes seen in the way that Jews were depicted in art, particularly in the 17th century. Pejorative tropes of Jews in the medieval period did not entirely disappear, but there were now straightforward scenes of Jewish religious worship and everyday life, indicating more tolerant attitudes by larger Western European society. At the close of period, the French Revolution abolished restrictions against Jews and made them full citizens.

=== Catholic Spain and Portugal ===
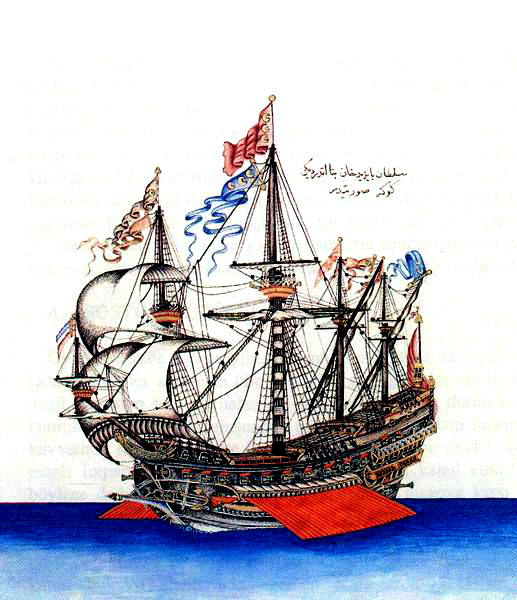
Sultan Bayezid II sent Kemal Reis to save the Arabs and Sephardic Jews of Spain from the Spanish Inquisition in 1492, and granted them permission to settle in the Ottoman Empire

The fall of Kingdom of Granada the last Muslim kingdom in Iberia in 1492 to the conquering Catholic Monarchs initiated period of religious change in Spain. There had already been considerable pressure for Jews to convert to Christianity and to monitor that their conversions were sincere and orthodox, the Holy Office of the Spanish Inquisition was established in 1478 by Ferdinand and Isabella to maintain Catholic orthodoxy. It was not definitively abolished until 1834, during the reign of Isabel II. The Inquisition was an ecclesiastical tribunal, had jurisdiction only over baptized Christians. Christian converts (conversos or Marranos) came under scrutiny. The Alhambra Decree of 1492 forced Jews to decide whether to stay and be baptized Christians or to leave immediately, often forfeited considerable economic resources along with severing connections to their relatives who stayed. Some left for the Ottoman Empire, where they could continue under Muslim authority and with particular rights that they had exercised in Muslim Iberia. Many more Spanish Jews left for the adjoining Kingdom of Portugal, where there was also a large resident Jewish population. However, in 1496–97, Jews in Portugal were forced to convert to Christianity, but unlike Spain, there was no Portuguese Inquisition and one was not established until 1536.

=== Amsterdam as the "Dutch Jerusalem" ===
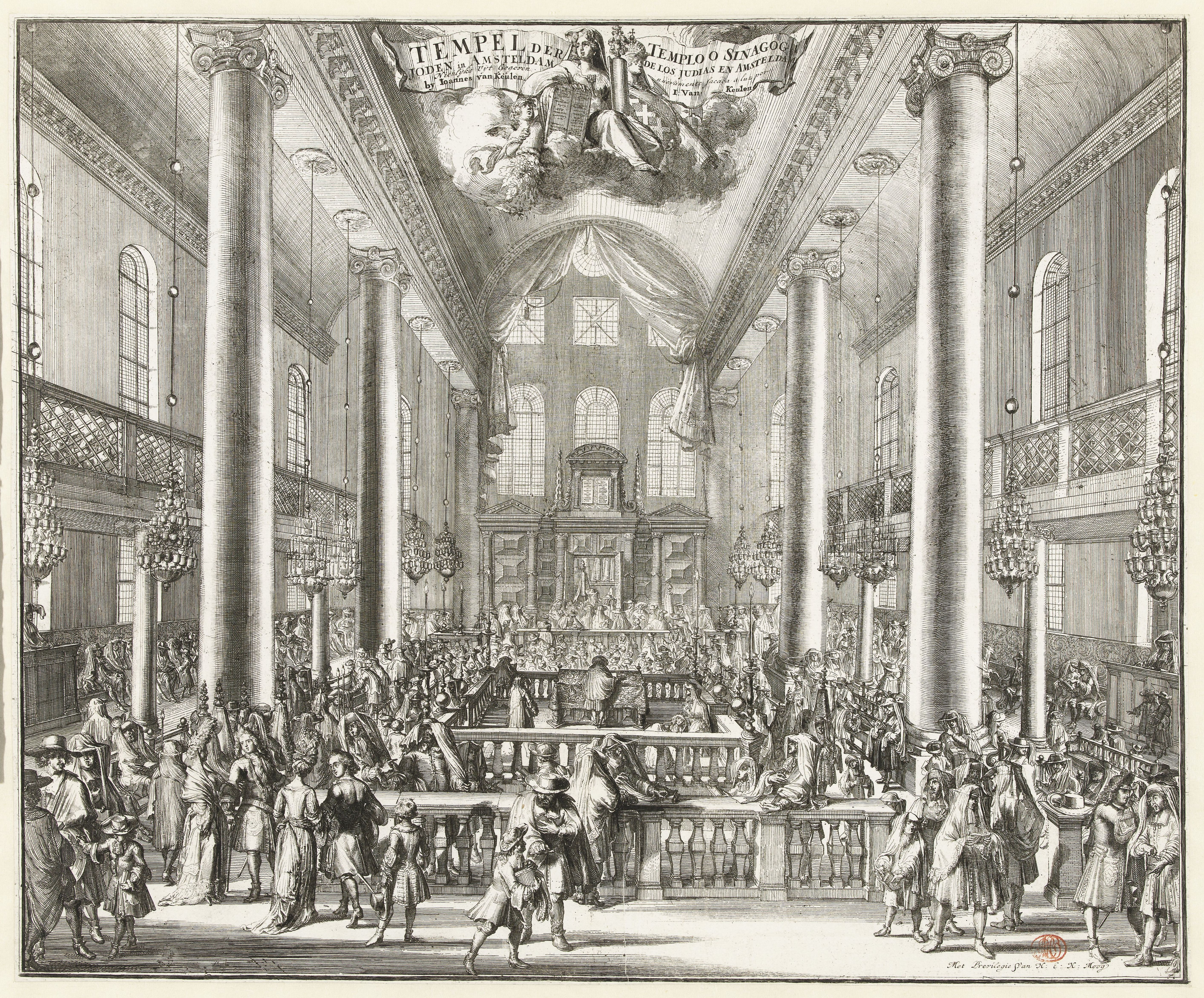
Interior of the Portuguese Synagogue, Amsterdam in 1695 by Romeyn de Hooghe

When the Protestant Dutch Republic revolted against Catholic Spain in what became the Eighty Years' War, Portuguese and Spanish Jews forced to convert to Catholicism (conversos or Marranos) began migrating to the northern provinces of the Netherlands. Religious tolerance, the freedom of conscience to practice one's religion without impediment, was a core Dutch Protestant value. These Sephardic migrants established a thriving community in Amsterdam, which became known as the "Dutch Jerusalem" Three Sephardic congregations merged and built a huge synagogue, the Portuguese Synagogue, opening in 1675. Prosperous Jewish merchants built opulent houses among successful non-Jewish merchants, since there was no restriction of Jews to particular residential quarters. The Iberian Jews strongly identified both as Jews and as ethnically Portuguese, calling themselves "Hebrews of the Portuguese Nation". Amsterdam's Portuguese Jewish merchants created a huge trade network in the Americas, with Portuguese Jews emigrating to the Caribbean and to Brazil. Ashkenazi Jews settled in Amsterdam as well but were generally poorer than the Sephardim and dependent of their charity. However, Amsterdam's prosperity faltered in the late seventeenth century, as did the fortunes and number of Sephardic Jews, while the Ashkenazi Jews' numbers continued to rise and have dominated the Netherlands ever since.

=== England re-opens to Jewish Settlement ===
England expelled its small Jewish population (ca. 2,000) in 1290, but in the seventeenth century, prominent Portuguese Jewish rabbi Menasseh ben Israel petition Oliver Cromwell to permit Jews to live and work in England. The modern Jewish presence in England dates from 1656. In the 16th century some merchants were New Christians (converted Jews), but only in the 17th c. were the English receptive to the idea of Jewish resettlement. Those who migrated to England were from the Sephardic Jews of Amsterdam, where they lived openly as Jews in the religiously tolerant Dutch Republic, where merchants prospered in as international trade of the Atlantic world.

=== Poland as a center of the Jewish community ===
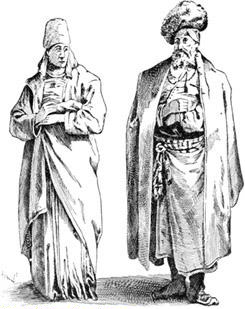
A Jewish couple, Poland, c. 1765

The expulsion of the Jews from Spain in 1492, as well as expulsion from Austria, Hungary and Germany, stimulated a widespread Jewish migration to the much more tolerant Poland. Indeed, with the expulsion of the Jews from Spain, Poland became the recognized haven for exiles from the rest of Europe; and the resulting accession to the ranks of Polish Jewry made it a cultural and spiritual center of the Jewish people in Europe.

The most prosperous period for Polish Jews began following this new influx of Jews with the reign of Sigismund I the Old (r. 1506–1548), who protected the Jews in his realm. His son, Sigismund II Augustus (r. 1548–1572), mainly followed the tolerant policy of his father and also granted autonomy to the Jews in the matter of communal administration, laying the foundation for the power of the Qahal, or autonomous Jewish community. This period led to the creation of a proverb about Poland being a "heaven for the Jews". According to some sources, about three-quarters of all the Jews in Europe lived in Poland by the middle of the 16th century. In the middle of the 16th century, Poland welcomed Jewish newcomers from Italy and Turkey, mostly of Sephardi origin; while some of the immigrants from the Ottoman Empire claimed to be Mizrahim. Jewish religious life thrived in many Polish communities. In 1503, the Polish monarchy appointed Rabbi Jacob Polak, the official Rabbi of Poland, marking the emergence of the Chief Rabbinate. Around 1550, many Sephardi Jews travelled across Europe to find a haven in Poland. Therefore, the Polish Jews are said to be of many ethnic origins including Ashkenazic, Sephardic, and Mizrahi. During the 16th and 17th century Poland had the largest Jewish population in the whole of Europe.

By 1551, Polish Jews were given permission to choose their own Chief Rabbi. The Chief Rabbinate held power over law and finance, appointing judges and other officials. Other powers were shared with local councils. The Polish government permitted the Rabbinate to grow in power and used it for tax collection purposes. Only 30% of the money raised by the Rabbinate went to the Jewish communities. The rest went to the Crown for protection. In this period Poland-Lithuania became the main center for Ashkenazi Jewry, and its yeshivot achieved fame from the early 16th century.

Moses Isserles (1520–1572), an eminent Talmudist of the 16th century, established his yeshiva in Kraków. In addition to being a renowned Talmudic and legal scholar, Isserles was also learned in Kabbalah, and studied history, astronomy, and philosophy.

The culture and intellectual output of the Jewish community in Poland had a profound impact on Judaism as a whole. Some Jewish historians have recounted that the word Poland is pronounced as Polania or Polin in Hebrew, and as transliterated into Hebrew. These names for Poland were interpreted as "good omens" because Polania can be broken down into three Hebrew words: po ("here"), lan ("dwells"), ya ("God"), and Polin into two words of: po ("here") lin ("[you should] dwell"). The "message" was that Poland was meant to be a good place for the Jews. During the time from the rule of Sigismund I the Old until the Holocaust, Poland would be at the center of Jewish religious life.

Yeshivot were established, under the direction of the rabbis, in the more prominent communities. Such schools were officially known as gymnasiums, and their rabbi principals as rectors. Important yeshivot existed in Kraków, Poznań, and other cities. Jewish printing establishments came into existence in the first quarter of the 16th century. In 1530, a Hebrew Pentateuch (Torah) was printed in Kraków; and at the end of the 16th century the Jewish printing houses of that city and Lublin issued a large number of Jewish books, mainly of a religious character. The growth of Talmudic scholarship in Poland was coincident with the greater prosperity of the Polish Jews; and because of their communal autonomy educational development was wholly one-sided and along Talmudic lines. Exceptions are recorded, however, where Jewish youth sought secular instruction in the European universities. The learned rabbis became not merely expounders of the Law, but also spiritual advisers, teachers, judges, and legislators; and their authority compelled the communal leaders to make themselves familiar with the abstruse questions of Jewish law. Polish Jewry found its views of life shaped by the spirit of Talmudic and rabbinical literature, whose influence was felt in the home, in school, and in the synagogue.

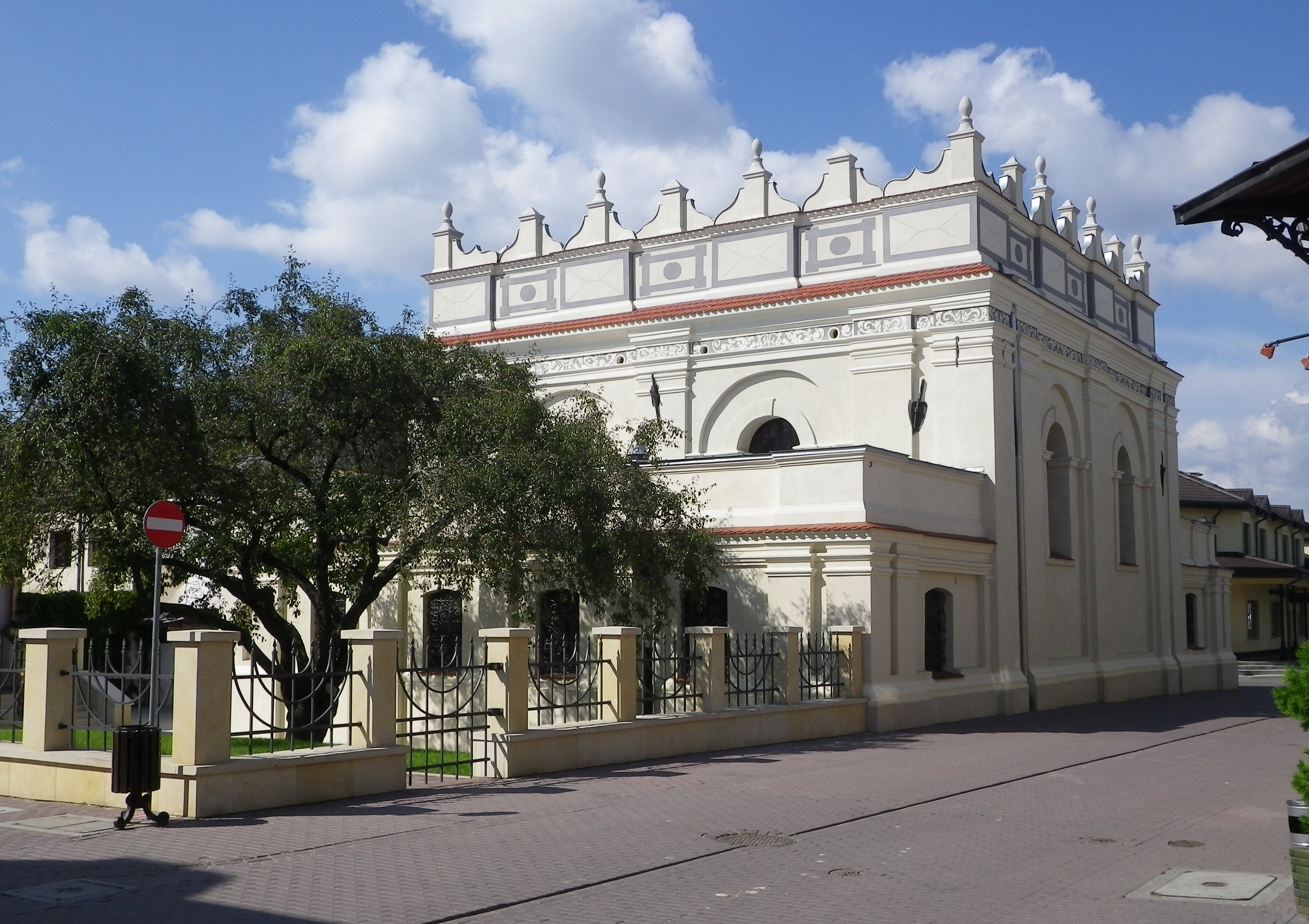
Late renaissance synagogue in Zamość, Poland (1610–1620)

In the first half of the 16th century the seeds of Talmudic learning had been transplanted to Poland from Bohemia, particularly from the school of Jacob Pollak, the creator of Pilpul ("sharp reasoning"). Shalom Shachna (c. 1500 – 1558), a pupil of Pollak, is counted among the pioneers of Talmudic learning in Poland. He lived and died in Lublin, where he was the head of the yeshivah which produced the rabbinical celebrities of the following century. Shachna's son Israel became rabbi of Lublin on the death of his father, and Shachna's pupil Moses Isserles (known as the ReMA) (1520–1572) achieved an international reputation among the Jews as the author of the Mappah, which adapted the Shulkhan Arukh to meet the needs of the Ashkenazi community. His contemporary and correspondent Solomon Luria (1510–1573) of Lublin also enjoyed widespread popularity among his co-religionists; and the authority of both was recognized by the Jews throughout Europe. Heated religious disputations were common, and Jewish scholars participated in them. At the same time, the Kabbalah had become entrenched under the protection of Rabbinism; and such scholars as Mordecai Jaffe and Yoel Sirkis devoted themselves to its study. This period of great Rabbinical scholarship was interrupted by the Khmelnytsky Uprising and the Swedish Deluge.

==== Growth of Hasidism ====
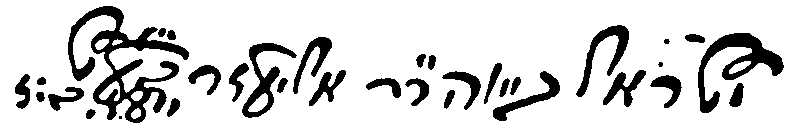
Israel ben Eliezer's autograph

The decade from the Cossacks' uprising until after the Deluge period (1648–1658) left a deep and lasting impression not only on the social life of the Polish-Lithuanian Jews, but on their spiritual life as well. The intellectual output of the Jews of Poland was reduced. The Talmudic learning which up to that period had been the common possession of the majority of the people became accessible to a limited number of students only. What religious study there was became overly formalized, some rabbis busied themselves with quibbles concerning religious laws; others wrote commentaries on different parts of the Talmud in which hair-splitting arguments were raised and discussed; and at times these arguments dealt with matters which were of no practical importance. At the same time, many miracle workers made their appearance among the Jews of Poland, culminating in a series of false "Messianic" movements, most famously Sabbateanism and Frankism.

Into this time of mysticism and overly formal rabbinism came the teachings of Israel ben Eliezer, known as the Baal Shem Tov, or BeShT, (1698–1760), which had a profound effect on the Jews of Central Europe and Poland in particular. His disciples taught and encouraged a new fervent brand of Judaism based on Kabbalah known as Hasidism. The rise of Hasidic Judaism within Poland's borders and beyond had a great influence on the rise of Haredi Judaism all over the world, with a continuous influence through its many Hasidic dynasties including those of Chabad-Lubavitch, Aleksander, Bobov, Ger, and Nadvorna. More recent rebbes of Polish origin include Rabbi Yosef Yitzchok Schneersohn (1880–1950), the sixth head of the Chabad Lubavitch Hasidic movement, who lived in Warsaw until 1940 when he moved Lubavitch from Warsaw to the United States.

== Modern era, 1750 to 1930 ==
=== Jewish emancipation ===
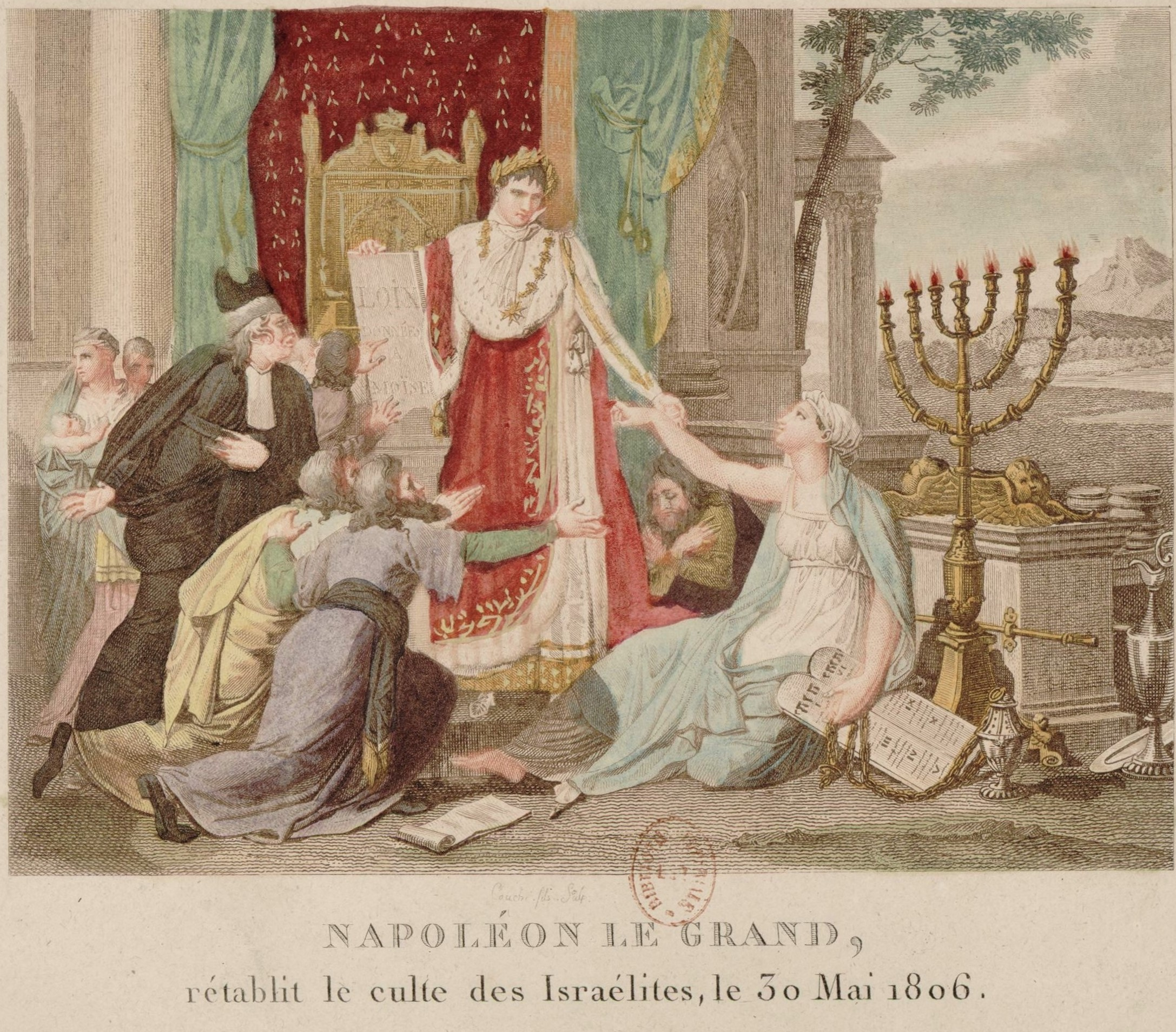
An 1806 French print depicts Napoleon Bonaparte emancipating the Jews

As part of the egalitarian principles of the French Revolution, Jews became full citizens without restrictions. Napoleon expanded the egalitarian principles in the places his armies conquered. Even in the Netherlands, which had a well-established tradition of religious tolerance, when it came under French sway, Jewish religious leaders no longer could exercise authority in an autonomous community. The so-called Jewish question was active exploration of a potentially new vision of the Jews' place in European states. The Jewish Enlightentment produced an important body of knowledge and speculation on a range of questions regarding Jewish identity. A leading figure was German Jewish philosopher Moses Mendelssohn.

=== Changing conditions for Jewish populations ===
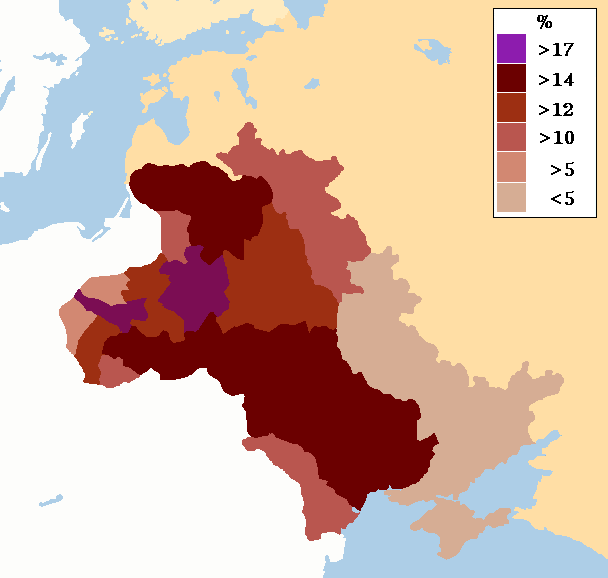
Map of the Jewish population within the Russian Empire in 1905

By the late 19th and early 20th centuries, Russia was the European country with the largest Jewish population, following annexation of Poland. In 1897, according to Russian census of 1897, the total Jewish population of Russia was 5.1 million people, which was 4.13% of the total population. Of this total, the vast majority lived within the Pale of Settlement. Jews faced widespread discrimination and oppression. As the Czarist monarchy was openly antisemitic; various pogroms, which were large-scale violent protests directed at Jews, took place across the western part of the vast empire since late 19th century, leading to several deaths and waves of emigration.

Difficult conditions in Eastern Europe and the possibility of bettering their lot elsewhere triggered Jewish migration to Western Europe, particularly where Jews were already living in conditions of religious toleration, such as the Netherlands and England, where there were also more economic opportunities for impoverished Eastern European Jews. In England, the original Sephardic Jewish community of bankers and brokers after England re-opened settlement to Jews, went from a small community in the 18th century, to a prosperous one in the first two-thirds of the 19th century. In the late 19th century up to the outbreak of World War I, English-born Jews, who had integrated well were now, had waves of poorer, more religious Eastern European Jews settle in great numbers. The Netherlands had already experienced migration of Eastern European Jews, mainly from Germany, starting in the 17th century. While the Portuguese-speaking Jews had been economically and culturally dominant in the 17th century, they declined in numbers and economic clout when the poorer Asheknazic population was increasing and remained numerically dominant going forward.

In Hungary the early 19th century, in the reform age the progressive nobility set many goals of innovation, such as the emancipation of the Hungarian Jewry. Hungarian Jews were able to play a part in the economy by assuming an important role in industrial and trading development. For example, Izsák Lőwy (1793–1847) founded his leather factory on a previously purchased piece of land in 1835, and created a new, modern town, with independent authority, religious equality and industrial freedom independent from the guilds. The town, which was given the name Újpest (New Pest), soon became an important settlement. Its first synagogue was built in 1839. (Újpest, the current capital's 4th district is in the northern part of Budapest. During the time of the Holocaust 20,000 Jews were deported from here.) Mór Fischer Farkasházi (1800–1880) founded his world-famous porcelain factory in Herend in 1839, its fine porcelains decorated, among others, Queen Victoria's table.

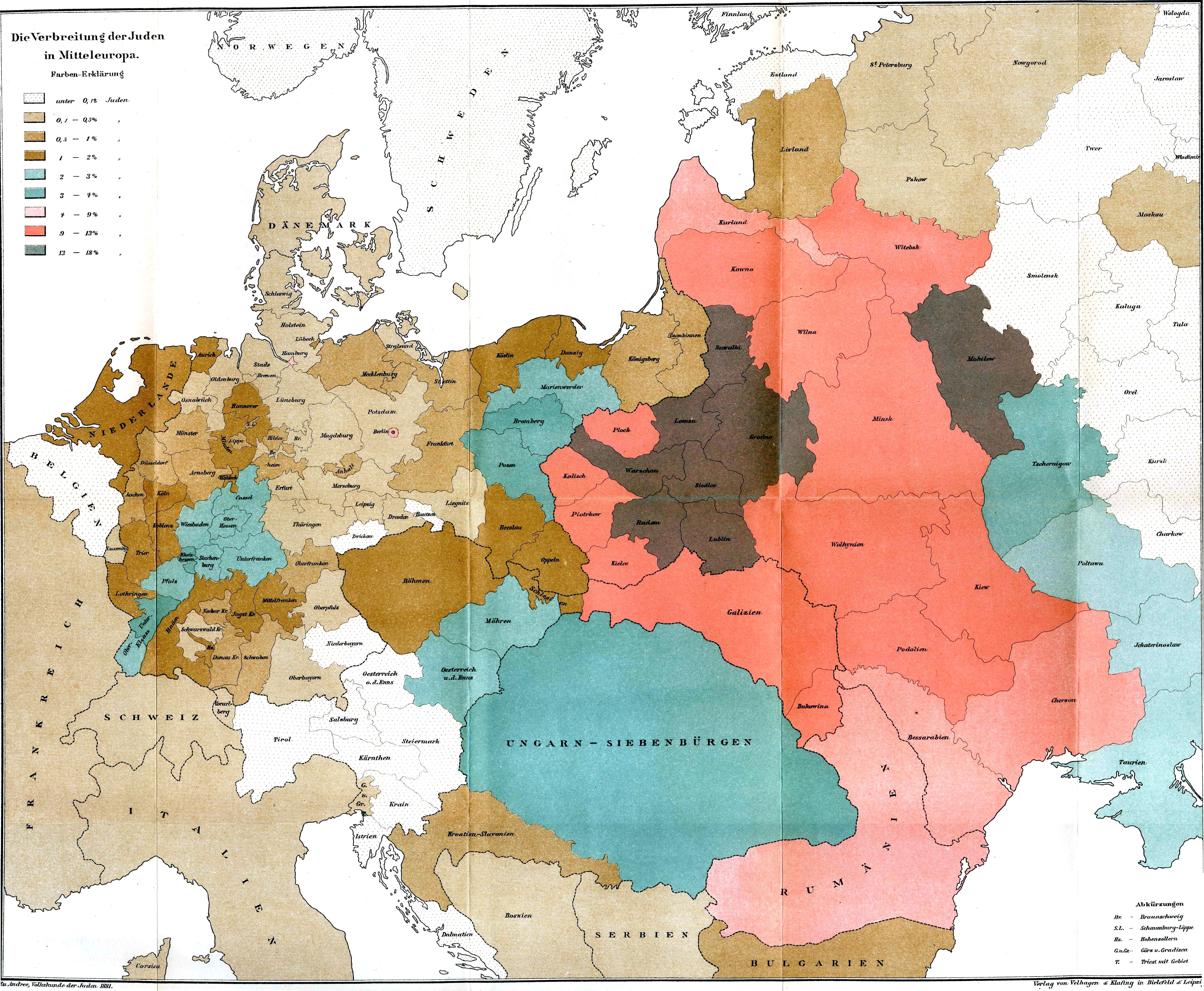
The Jews in Central Europe (1881)

In the Papal States, which existed until 1870, Jews were required to live only in specified neighborhoods called ghettos. Until the 1840s, they were required to regularly attend sermons urging their conversion to Christianity. Only Jews were taxed to support state boarding schools for Jewish converts to Christianity. It was illegal to convert from Christianity to Judaism. Sometimes Jews were baptized involuntarily, and, even when such baptisms were illegal, forced to practice the Christian religion. In many such cases the state separated them from their families. The Edgardo Mortara case was an instance of acrimony between Catholics and Jews in the Papal States in the second half of the 19th century, which would be one of the factors for the unification of Italy.

=== Jewish emigration from Europe ===
Starting in the 19th century after Jewish emancipation, European Jews left the continent in huge numbers, especially for the United States and some other countries, to pursue better opportunity and to escape religious persecution, including pogroms, and to flee violence. Jews coming to the U.S. in the early to mid-19th century were mostly from central Europe, especially Bavaria, Western Prussia, and Posen. They were not the poorest of the poor and a significant number came as families (husband, wife, children). Non-Jewish Germans also immigrated in great numbers at the same time, because of conditions in Europe and the lure of better conditions in the U.S. Although the non-Jewish Germans then began to come in lower numbers, Jewish immigration continued to be robust into the twentieth century, an estimated 250,000. Some Jews emigrated to Palestine controlled by European powers, and, following World War II, the European Jews emigrated to the newly established State of Israel.

=== Zionism ===
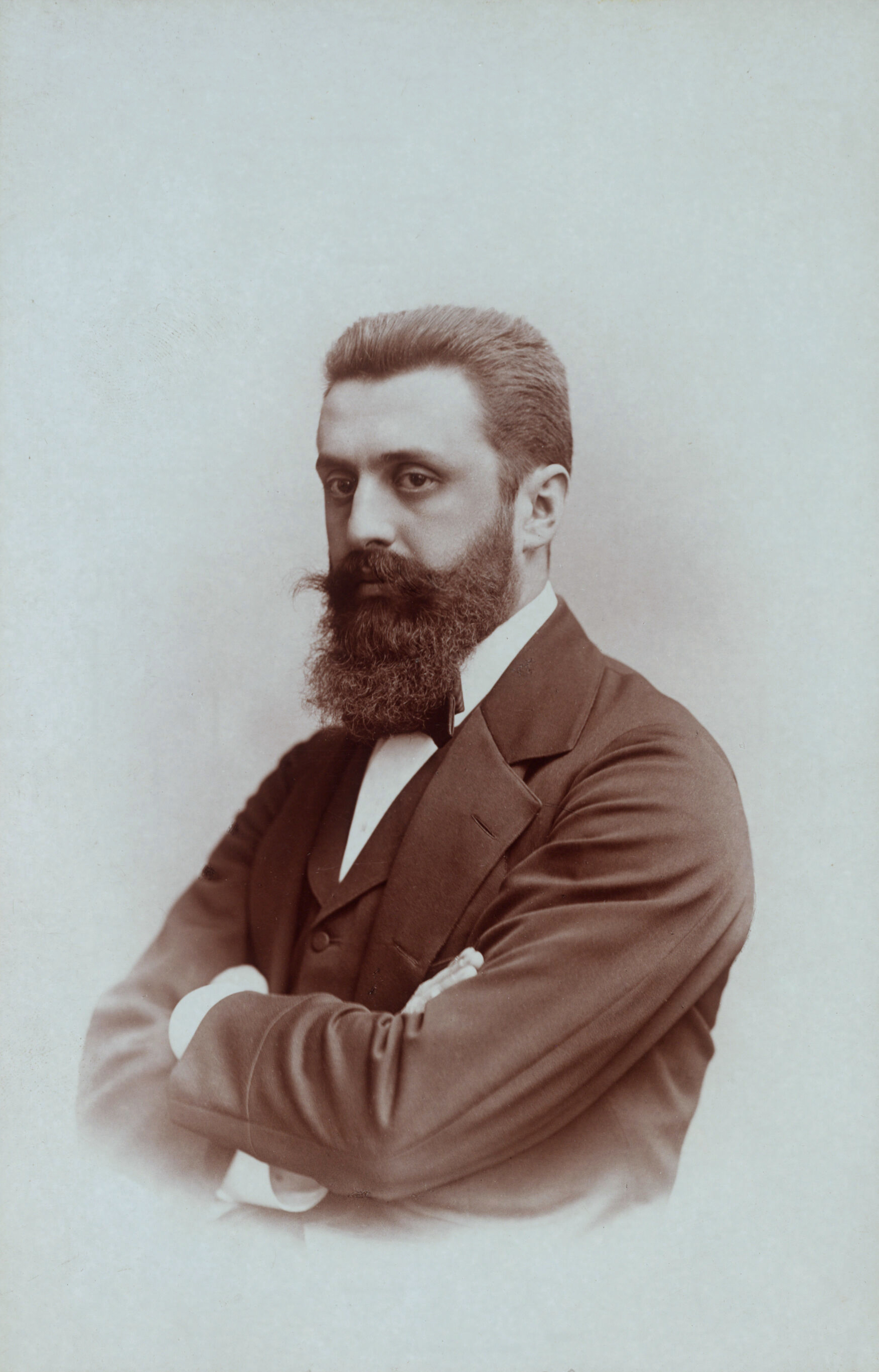
Theodor Herzl was the founder of the Modern Zionist movement and envisioned the founding of a future independent Jewish state

The movement of Zionism originates in the late 19th century. In 1883, Nathan Birnbaum founded Kadimah, the first Jewish student association in Vienna. In 1884, the first issue of Selbstemanzipation (Self Emancipation) appeared, printed by Birnbaum himself. The Dreyfus Affair, which erupted in France in 1894, profoundly shocked emancipated Jews. The depth of antisemitism in a country thought of as the home of enlightenment and liberty led many to question their future security in Europe. Among those who witnessed the Affair was an Austro-Hungarian (born in Budapest, lived in Vienna) Jewish journalist, Theodor Herzl, who published his pamphlet Der Judenstaat ("The Jewish State") in 1896 and Altneuland ("The Old New Land") in 1897. He described the Affair as a personal turning point, Before the Affair, Herzl had been anti-Zionist; afterwards he became ardently pro-Zionist. In line with the ideas of 19th-century German nationalism Herzl believed in a Jewish state for the Jewish nation. In that way, he argued, the Jews could become a people like all other peoples, and antisemitism would cease to exist.

Herzl infused political Zionism with a new and practical urgency. He brought the World Zionist Organization into being and, together with Nathan Birnbaum, planned its First Congress at Basel in 1897. For the first four years, the World Zionist Organization (WZO) met every year, then, up to the Second World War, they gathered every second year. Since the war, the Congress has met every four years.

=== Religious organizations ===
In 1868/69, three major Jewish organizations were founded: the largest group were the more modern congressional or neolog Jews, the very traditional-minded joined the orthodox movement, and the conservatives formed the status quo organization. The neolog Grand Synagogue had been built earlier, in 1859, in the Dohány Street. The main status quo temple, the nearby Rumbach Street Synagogue was constructed in 1872. The Budapest orthodox synagogue is located on Kazinczy Street, along with the orthodox community's headquarters and mikveh.

In May 1923, in the presence of President Michael Hainisch, the First World Congress of Jewish Women was inaugurated at the Hofburg in Vienna, Austria.

=== Demographics ===
Jewish population in interwar Europe, approximately as of 1933:

Country	Jewish population	as % of national population	as % of total Jewish population in Europe
Albania	200	0.0	0.0
Austria	191,000	2.8	2.1
Belgium	60,300	0.7	0.7
Bulgaria	48,500	0.8	0.5
Czechoslovakia	357,000	2.4	3.9
Danzig	10,000	3.6	0.1
Denmark	5,700	0.1	0.1
Estonia	4,600	0.4	0.1
Finland	1,800	0.1	0.0
France	250,000	0.6	2.8
Germany	525,000	0.8	5.7
Greece	73,000	1.2	0.8
Hungary	445,000	5.1	4.9
Iceland	10	0.0	0.0
Ireland	3,600	0.1	0.0
Italy	48,000	0.1	0.5
Latvia	95,600	4.9	1.0
Lithuania	155,000	7.6	1.7
Luxembourg	1,200	0.4	0.0
Monaco	300	1.4	0.0
Netherlands	156,000	1.8	1.7
Norway	1,400	0.1	0.0
Poland	3,000,000	9.5	32.7
Portugal	1,200	0.0	0.0
Romania	756,000	4.2	8.3
Spain	4,000	0.0	0.0
USSR	2,525,000	3.4	27.6
Sweden	6,700	0.1	0.1
Switzerland	21,000	0.5	0.2
Turkey	50,000	0.7	0.5
United Kingdom	300,000	0.7	3.3
Yugoslavia	68,000	0.5	0.7

== World War II and the Holocaust ==
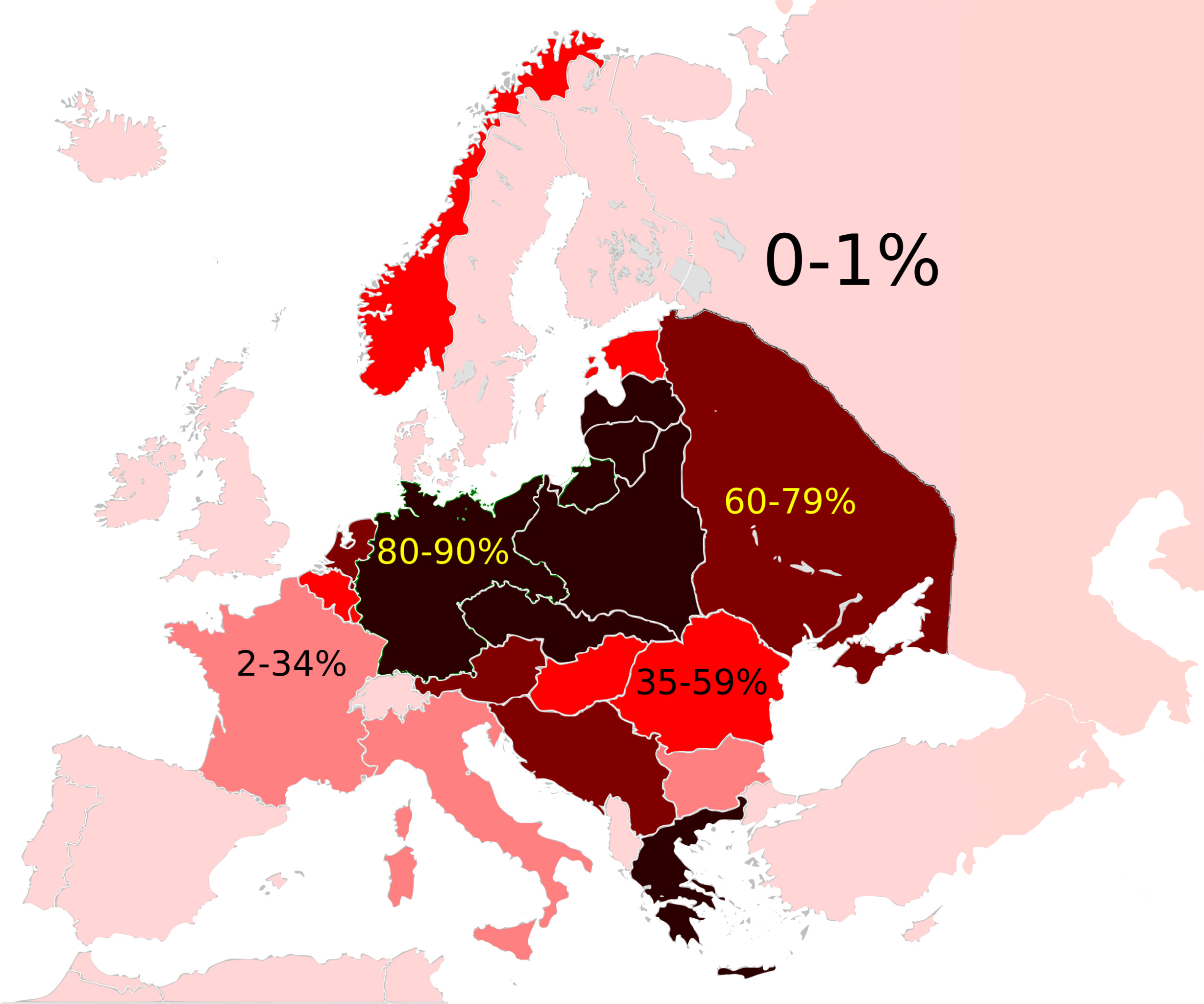
Holocaust death toll as a percentage of the total pre-war Jewish population in Europe

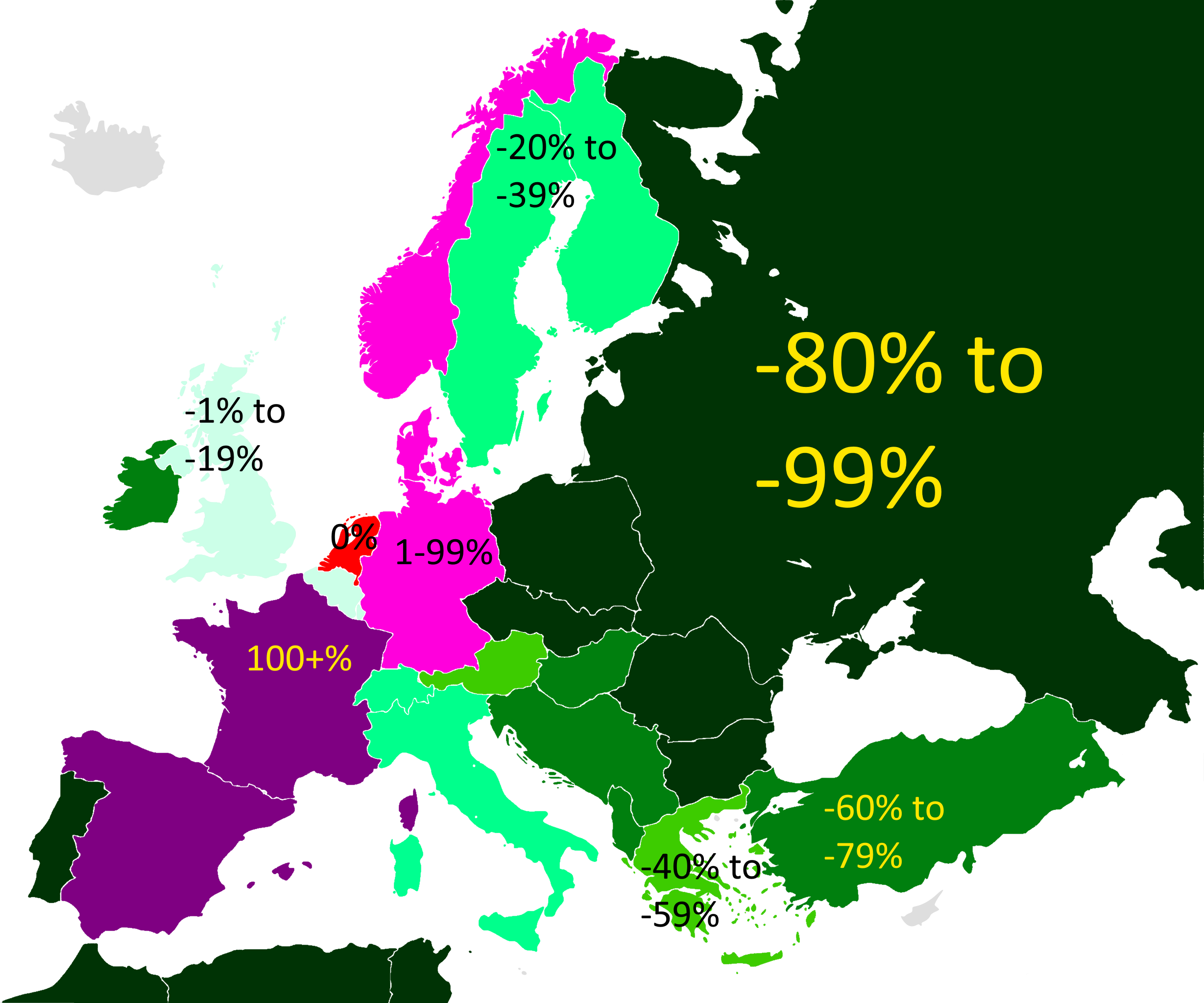
The Jewish population growth/decline by country between 1945–1946 and 2010. The countries with the greatest Jewish population losses since 1945 were primarily those in Central and Eastern Europe.

The Holocaust of the Jewish people (from the Greek ὁλόκαυστον (holókauston): holos, "completely" and kaustos, "burnt"), also known as Ha-Shoah (Hebrew: השואה), or Churben (Yiddish: חורבן), as described in June 2013 at Auschwitz by Avner Shalev (Director of Yad Vashem) is the term which is generally used to describe the murder of approximately 6,000,000 Jews during World War II, a deliberate attempt to annihilate the Jewish people, executed by the Nazi regime in Nazi Germany led by Adolf Hitler and its accomplices; the result of the Shoah or the Holocaust of the Jewish people was the destruction of hundreds of Jewish communities in continental Europe—two out of three Jews of Europe and one third of all Jews on Earth were murdered.

== Post World War II ==
=== Demographics ===
The Jewish population of Europe in 2010 was estimated to be approximately 1.4 million (0.2% of the European population) or 10% of the world's Jewish population. In the 21st century, France has the largest Jewish population in Europe, followed by the United Kingdom, Germany, Russia and Ukraine.

Country	Core Jewish population in 2010	Enlarged Jewish population in 2010	Jewish groups	Jewish history	Lists of Jews
Albania	43			Albania	South-East European
Andorra	<100			Andorra	South European, Iberian
Austria	9,000	15,000		Austria	West European; Austrian
Belarus	12,926 (Belarus census (2009))	33,000		Belarus	East European; Russia, Ukraine and Belarus
Belgium	30,300	40,000		Belgium	West European
Bosnia and Herzegovina	500		Sephardi and Ashkenazi	Bosnia and Herzegovina	South-East European
Bulgaria	2,000			Bulgaria	South-East European
Croatia	1,700			Croatia	South-East European
Cyprus	3,500 (2018)			Cyprus	South-East European
Czech Republic	30,900			Czech Republic and Carpathian Ruthenia	East European; Czech, Slovak
Denmark	2,400			Denmark	North European
Estonia	1,800	3,000		Estonia	North European
Finland	1,100			Finland	North European
France	483,500	580,000	Ashkenazi and Sephardi Jews	France	West European Maghreb; French AlgerianMoroccan Tunisian
Georgia	3,200	6,000	Georgian Jews	Georgia	East European; Georgian
Germany	119,000	250,000	Ashkenazi Jews	Germany	West European; German
Gibraltar	600		Sephardic Jews and British Jews	Gibraltar	South EuropeanIberian Maghreb
Greece	4,500		Romaniotes, Sephardi Jews	Greece	South-East European
Hungary	48,600	100,000	Oberlander Jews, Satmar Hasidic dynasty, and Neolog	Hungary and Carpathian Ruthenia	East European; Hungarian
Iceland	10–30		Radhanites	Iceland	North European
Ireland	2,600	4,476		Ireland	West European
Italy	28,400	45,000	Italian Jews	Italy	South European
Kosovo	<100			Kosovo	South-East European
Latvia	6,437 (Latvian census of 2011)	19,000		Latvia	North European
Liechtenstein	<100			Liechtenstein	West European
Lithuania	3,400 (2011 estimate)	5,000	Lithuanian Jews	Lithuania	North European
Luxembourg	600			Luxembourg	West European
Malta	<100			Malta	South European
Moldova	4,100	8,000	Bessarabian Jews	Moldova	East European
Monaco	<100			Monaco	West European
Montenegro	12			Montenegro	South-East European
Netherlands	30,000	43,000	Sephardi and Ashkenazi	Netherlands and Chuts	West European
North Macedonia	100		North Macedonian	North Macedonia	South-East European
Norway	1,200		Jews in Norway	Norway	North European
Poland	21,200	30,000	Chronology of Jewish Polish history	Poland	East European; Polish
Portugal	500		Spanish and Portuguese Jews	Portugal	South European, Iberian
Romania	9,700	18,000		Romania	East European; Romanian
Russia	157,673 (including Asian Russia) (Russian Census (2010))	400,000	Ashkenazi Jews and Mountain Jews	Russia	East European; Russia, Ukraine, and Belarus
San Marino	<100			San Marino	South European
Serbia	1,400		Sephardi and Ashkenazi	Serbia	South-East European
Slovakia	9,600		Oberlander Jews	Slovakia and Carpathian Ruthenia	East European; Czech, Slovak
Slovenia	100			Slovenia	South-East European
Spain	12,000	15,000	Sephardic Jews, Moroccan Jews, Jews from Latin America	Spain and Islamic-ruled Al-Andalus	South European, Iberian, Moroccan Jews
Sweden	15,000	25,000		Sweden	North European
Switzerland	17,600	25,000		Switzerland	West European
Turkey	17,600	21,000	Turkish Jews		Sephardic
Ukraine	71,500	145,000	Ashkenazi Jews	Ukraine and Carpathian Ruthenia	East European; Russia, Ukraine and Belarus
United Kingdom	292,000	350,000	British Jews	United Kingdom	West European; British

=== Jewish ethnic subdivisions of Europe ===
- Armenian Jews
- Ashkenazim (Yiddish speaking Jews)
- Crimean Karaites and Krymchaks (Crimean Jews)
- Georgian Jews
- Italian Jews (also known as Bnei Roma)
- Mizrahi Jews
- Romaniotes (Greek Jews)
- Sephardim (Spanish/Portuguese Jews)
- Turkish Jews

== See also ==
- Antisemitism
  - Antisemitism by country
    - Antisemitism in Europe
      - History of antisemitism
- Statute of Kalisz
- History of Europe
- Jewish culture
- Jewish diaspora
- Jewish ethnic divisions
- Jewish history
- Jewish religious movements
  - Jewish schisms
- The YIVO Encyclopedia of Jews in Eastern Europe
