= Sacerdote (surname) =

Sacerdote is an Italian surname. Notable people with the surname include:

- Ana Sacerdote (1925–2019), Argentine Jewish abstract artist
- Anselmo Sacerdote (1868–1926), Italian Jewish painter, engraver and photographer
- Bruce Sacerdote (graduated 1990), American economist
- David Sacerdote (1550–1625), Italian Jewish composer and banker
- Donato Sacerdote (1820–1883), Italian Jewish poet
- Eugenia Sacerdote de Lustig (1910 – 2011), Italian-born Argentine physician
- Jenny Sacerdote (1868–1962), French couturier

== See also ==
- Sacerdote (disambiguation)
