= Diego Gutiérrez de la Caballeria =

Spanish 16th century pioneer, settler and noble that colonized New Spain

Don Diego Gutierrez de la Caballería
- Born: 1501; Almagro (Ciudad Real, Spain)
- Died: February 1542 (aged 40–41); Jalisco, possibly Nochistlan (New Spain)
- Cause of death: Ambush
- Occupation(s): Settler, explorer, soldier, encomendero
- Title: Hidalgo, Poblador of New Spain, Vecino of New Spain
- Spouse: Isabel Mexía Bocanegra
- Children: 3
- Relatives: Marina de la Caballería (sister), Alonso de Estrada (brother in law)
- Military career
- Allegiance: Viceroy Mendoza, New Spain, Spain

Diego de la Caballería, full name Don Diego Gutierrez de la Caballería, also spelled Don Diego Gutierrez de la Cavallería, was a Spanish pioneer, settler and noble who took part in the colonization of New Spain in the 16th century. He traveled to the New World under the protection of his sister, Marina de la Caballería, and became an influential part of New Spain's society.

He was born in Almagro, to an influential family of New Christians. Marina's family were known as a converso family in the city. His mother was Mayor Flores de Guevara, a member of the local nobility. His father, Juan Gutierrez de la Caballeria, was a merchant and supplier of the Order of Calatrava. Diego had five siblings who lived until adulthood.

Despite his converso ancestry, Diego's family was granted purity of blood by the king of Aragon, in recognition of their loyal services as royal counselors. Thanks to this certificate, and to his sister's marriage to New Spain's treasurer Alonso de Estrada, Diego was allowed to travel to the New World. There he was part of his sister's household for a brief time, before establishing himself on his own.

He received the rank of "poblador", which literally means "settler", and granted him rights of citizenship in New Spain.

His hard work to help develop the city, stabilize daily life and integrate with the local population gave him a prominent place in early New Spanish society. His daughter married the son of conqueror Alonso Pérez, which proves the importance, or at least the respect, he had acquired in local society, even if he had no known encomienda of his own.

In 1537 he earned the title of "vecino" (neighbour) of the city, which granted him full citizenship rights and representation on the city council.

The 1540 roster of the Coronado Expedition mentions him as the captain of cavalry, one of the six captains assisting Coronado. He became captain during the preparations of the expedition. Circumstances around him and his role in the expedition are a mystery: even though he appears listed in the roster along with his six horses, he is not mentioned again in further documents by Coronado. A hypothesis for this is that Diego was one of the sponsors of the expedition, but was killed by natives in an ambush and never made it past Culicán.
