= Marina de la Caballería =

Spanish pioneer, settler, noblewoman (d. 1540)

Doña Marina Flores Gutierrez de la Caballería
- Born: unknown Almagro, Ciudad Real, Spain
- Died: 1540; Tenochtitlan, New Spain
- Occupations: Settler, pioneer
- Title: Poblador of New Spain, Vecino of New Spain
- Spouse: Alonso de Estrada (m. 1508; died 1530)
- Children: 5
- Parents: Juan Gutierrez de la Caballeria (father); Mayor Flores de Guevara (mother)
- Relatives: Diego Gutiérrez de la Caballeria (brother)

Marina de la Caballería, full name Doña Marina Flores Gutierrez de la Caballería, (died 1540), was a Spanish pioneer, settler and noblewoman who colonized New Spain in the 16th century. She arrived to the New World in 1528 to reunite with her husband, Alonso de Estrada.

== Ancestry and early life ==
She was born in Almagro, a city that was home to a powerful Jewish community. Her mother was Mayor Flores de Guevara, belonged to the local nobility and was distantly related to Isabella I of Castile. She was part of a well-respected and prosperous family. Through her, Marina acquired noble status and the right to the title of doña. Her father, Juan Gutierrez de la Caballeria was a highly successful merchant and supplier of the Order of Calatrava. Marina had five siblings who lived until adulthood. Four of them, like Marina, kept their mother's last name first, a common practice in Spain when the mother's last name was the most prestigious; a fifth one kept his father's last name first and his mother's second.

Modern historians believe that Marina belonged to a family of New Christians. Marina's family were known as a converso family in the city. Despite this, the family was well respected, strongly involved in the city's daily life, and in its power structure. Five of Marina's relatives were members of the city council, and the family's forebears had been long time royal advisors. The ambience of tolerance towards the Jews and conversos in Spain was approaching its end though. After the Alhambra Decree various Jewish families of Almagro chose to leave the city instead of converting.

Those who converted faced a period of close scrutiny by the Spanish Inquisition due to concerns of Crypto-Judaism. Marina's family didn't suffer this inconvenience as much as others. In their case, as in the case of many other converso families that were considered of proven loyalty or towards whom the crown felt indebted, the crown issued special documents declaring them pure of blood regardless of their ancestry.

Marina spent her youth being taught the proper ways for a woman. Elizabeth Howe believes that, thanks to her family's proximity to Isabella, Marina probably benefited from the insistence of Queen Isabella on the education of noble women in every other subject, such as math and history. This would explain her impressive future impact on Mexican society.

Despite their certificate of purity of blood, it's possible that the growing religious tensions limited Marina's options to marry within her own city.

== Married life ==
In 1508 Marina married Alonso de Estrada in Ciudad Real. Alonso de Estrada was the illegitimate son of King Ferdinand II and had been raised in the royal court, was of old Christian blood, respected in Ciudad Real, wealthy, and fiercely intelligent. Their partnership produced the best possible scenario. As the uncle of Charles I of Spain, Alonso ascended quickly. Marina took charge of the administration of the couple's ever-growing estates and possessions, while her husband traveled to Mexico City in service of the king. They had five children together. In 1522 Alonso was given the position of treasurer and governor of New Spain and had to depart for the New World. Marina stayed behind with their children until she considered that her eldest child—a son—was ready to take charge of the family's properties, then she readied to travel to the new world.

== Trip to America ==
There were various voyages organized by the crown to reunite conquerors in America with their families. It is likely that she traveled along with a group of women in 1523 to Mexico City to rejoin her husband, Alonso.

During that voyage, Marina traveled along with her two youngest children, and her brother, Diego de Caballeria. The group arrived to Mexico City and rejoined Alonso. The city was mostly populated by natives, especially from the nations allied to Cortés. Marina surrounded her household with native women and learned basic Nahuatl in order to interact properly with merchants and neighbors. Her home soon became one of the centers of local social life.

== Widowhood ==
In 1530 Alonso died. Marina was left to fend for herself and three unmarried daughters. According to Spanish law, a widow was to receive the same social status and courtesies as her deceased husband until she remarried. She was also the universal heir of her husband and administrator of her daughters' inheritance. She fought several litigations in court, both for control of her husband's assets and for the right to bury him in the manner she considered proper for his rank.

Marina was also in charge of carrying her husband's last year as treasurer to term. The Spanish crown audited the accounting books of their secretaries yearly, in search of discrepancies or irregularities that needed punishment. In Alonso's absence it fell on his widow to provide explanations and reconcile the reports of all New Spain, which she successfully managed to do. Alonso's books turned out to have large amounts of missing money in them. Marina's properties in Ciudad Real were confiscated by the crown in reparation for the missing money, until she could repay it. For three years Marina wrangled with the Council of the Indies about a shipment of silver that Alonso had sent to his children in Spain. The argument was whether this money was personal or official, and therefore stolen. She also fought in court for the ownership of various encomiendas with so much insistence that Joanna of Castile personally intervened. She married her daughters to the most important people in Mexico. One of them she married close to the Mendoza family, powerful thanks to Antonio de Mendoza´s influence, and no friends of Hernán Cortés, to help her pursue her claims. The other she married to the new treasurer.

Marina also fought to receive all the recognition her husband used to enjoy. After several years she was granted an exception to the Spanish anti-slavery law and permission to own two slaves, a special privilege her husband and other first-line-conquerors had enjoyed.

== Legacy ==
Marina kept using this strategy of social influence, use of the legal system, and strategic marriages of her children to expand her influence and patrimony, while reporting poorness and economic misery in her letters to the king of Spain. By the end of her life Marina had accumulated one of the largest patrimonies and richest encomiendas of New Spain. Beyond her personal ambition, Marina's relentless energy was instrumental in returning order and stability to New Spain. She laid down the bases for social life, routines and social rites, and worked to establish a more organized trade, as well as to help the interaction between native noble allies and Spanish newcomers. She became a reference for new settlers, and worked hard to build a stable foundation for the daily workings of the city.
