= George Garden (minister) =

Scottish church minister

George Garden MA DD (1649–1733), was a Scottish church minister of the Church of Scotland and later a leading figure of the early Scottish Episcopal Church.

== Young years ==
Garden, a younger son of Rev Alexander Garden, minister of Forgue in Aberdeenshire, and his wife Isobell Middleton, was born at Forgue manse, and educated at King's College, Aberdeen, graduating MA in 1666 and by 1673, at the age of twenty-four, he was a "regent" (lecturer).

In 1677 he was ordained by Bishop Scougal, and appointed to succeed his father in the church of Forgue, with the bishop's son, Henry Scougal, preaching at Garden's induction. Two years later Garden was translated to St Machar's in Old Aberdeen.

In June 1678 he preached in the chapel of King's College the ‘funeral sermon’ on his friend, Henry Scougal. It is printed in many editions of Scougall's works, and throws light on the ideas of ministerial duty entertained among the clergy of the ‘second episcopacy’ (1662–1690).

== "Laid aside" ==
In 1683 Garden, already a D.D., became one of the ministers of the Kirk of St Nicholas, the parish church of New Aberdeen, where he continued until he was ‘laid aside’ by the privy council in 1692 for ‘not praying for their majesties,’ William III and Mary II. The Commission of the General Assembly of 1700 had him before them in connection with An Apology for M. Antonia Bourignon (1699, 8vo), attributed to him. Garden, who issued translations of several of Antoinette Bourignon's works with prefaces of his own, refused to disavow the authorship, asserted that ‘the said "Apology" as to the bulk of the book did represent the great end of Christianity, which is to bring us back to the love of God and charity, and further declared that the essentials of Christianity are set down in the said book, and that the accessories contained therein are not contrary thereto;’ whereupon the commission suspended him from the office of the ministry, and cited him to the assembly of 1701.

He did not appear, and the Assembly deposed him and ‘prohibited him from exercising the ministry or any part thereof in all time coming.’ Garden paid no regard to the sentence, and continued to officiate as before to the members of his former congregation who adhered to episcopacy.

== Against William III but for Queen Anne ==
In 1703 he dedicated to Queen Anne, in terms of fervent loyalty to her, but with outspoken censure of the new presbyterian establishment, his magnificent edition of the works of Dr John Forbes (1593–1648) (Joannis Forbesii a Corse Opera Omnia), which was published at Amsterdam.

Though he had refused to take the oaths to William and Mary, Garden had never approved the arbitrary policy of James II; he accepted the conditions of the Toleration Act; and when after the Peace of Utrecht the episcopal clergy of Aberdeen drew up an address of congratulation to the queen, he and his brother James were chosen to present it. Introduced by the Earl of Mar, then secretary of state for Scotland, they were received with marked graciousness, and poured into her majesty's not unwilling ear (along with their thanks for the freedom they now enjoyed, ‘not only in their exercise of the pastoral care over a willing people, but also in their use of the liturgy of the church of England’—then a new thing among the Scottish episcopalians) their complaints of the persecution they had lately suffered, and their entreaties for a further measure of relief.

== 1715 uprising ==
The queen's death made Garden and his brother Jacobites again; the insurrection of 1715 restored George for a brief period to the pulpit of St Nicholas, and the brothers were among those who presented to the Pretender at Earl Marischal's house at Fetteresso, Kincardineshire, the address of the episcopal clergy of Aberdeen. On the suppression of the rising, Garden was thrown into prison; he managed shortly afterwards to escape to the continent, but returned to Aberdeen before 1720, when he was talked of for election as their bishop by the Aberdeen clergy. The support he had given to Bourignianism was held by the Scottish bishops, and by Lockhart, the agent of the exiled prince, sufficient to disqualify him for such promotion.

== After his death ==
He died on 31 January 1733. He is buried under a stone slab at Old Machar churchyard in Old Aberdeen.

His epitaph illustrates the spread of high church doctrine since the revolution among the Scottish episcopalians that he is called "sacerdos" (the Latin term for priest). He had fairly earned the praise awarded him of being "literis et pietate insignis".’ Besides his great edition of Forbes he was the author of the Queries and Protestation of the Scots Episcopal Clergy given in to the Committee of the General Assembly at Aberdeen June 1694, 4to, London, 1694; The Case of the Episcopal Clergy, pts. i. and ii. 4to, Edinburgh, 1703; and he is probably the "George Garden of Aberdeen" who contributed to the Philosophical Transactions of 1677 and 1693.

His Bourignianism, says George Grub doubtfully, was probably due to sheer weariness of the controversies wherewith his country had been so long distracted; moreover, his friend Henry Scougall had been in the habit of going to France as well as to Flanders for spiritual improvement. They may be called the Scottish Quietists. Garden's sermon preached at Scougall's funeral was printed first in 1726.

== Brother James ==
His elder brother, James (1647–1726), minister successively of Carnbee (1678–81), New Machar in Aberdeenshire, Maryculter in Kincardineshire, and of Balmerino in Fife, became professor of divinity at King's College, Aberdeen, and was deprived in 1696 for refusing to sign the Westminster Confession of Faith. 'He seems to have shared his brother's love of mystical theology, without falling into errors of doctrine' (Grub); he shared also his brother's fortunes, and lies beside him in the churchyard of Old Machar. He is the author of a little treatise entitled Comparative Theology, or the True and Solid Grounds of a Pure and Peaceable Theology.
