= List of Iberian Jews =

Jews had lived in the Iberian Peninsula since the Ancient Age, experiencing a Golden Age under Muslim rule. Following the Reconquista and increasing persecution, many of them were expelled from Spain in 1492 and Portugal in 1497. Some of their descendants, known as the Sephardim, settled mainly in North Africa, South-East Europe, the Netherlands, England, and America. Jews were only formally readmitted to the peninsula in the late 19th century. The modern Jewish Iberian population is based on post-war immigration and numbers around 14,000. The following is a list of prominent Iberian Jews arranged by country of origin:

== Portugal ==
- Abraham Aboab Falero (? – 1642), seventeenth century philanthropist.
- Abraham Zacutus Lusitanus, (1575-1642), physician and medical author
- Daniel Blaufuks (1963–), photographer.
- Joshua Benoliel (1873–1932), photojournalist, official photographer for King Carlos I of Portugal.
- Moisés Bensabat Amzalak (1892–1978), Milgram, Avraham (2011). Portugal, Salazar, and the Jews. Yad Vashem. p. 34. ISBN 9789653083875.
- Isaac Cardoso (1603/1604 – 1683), physician, philosopher, and polemic writer.
- Artur Carlos de Barros Basto (1887–1961), author and military captain.
- Artur Alberto de Campos Henriques (1853–1922), 50th Prime Minister of Portugal.
- Nico Castel (1931–2015) tenor.
- Uriel da Costa (1585–1640), philosopher.
- Abraham Curiel (1545–1609), physician.
- David Curiel (1594–1666), merchant.
- Jacob Curiel (1587–1664), diplomat, merchant and nobleman.
- Tatiana Salem Levy (1979–), novelist.
- Rodrigo Lopez (1517–1594), physician
- Fernão de Loronha (1470–1540), explorer and merchant.
- Gracia Mendes Nasi (1510–1569), wealthy women of Renaissance Europe, became a prominent figure in the Ottoman Empire and developed an escape network that hundreds of Conversos.
- Solomon Molcho (1500–1532), mystic and writer.
- Garcia de Orta (1501–1578), herbalist, naturalist and physician.
- Pedro Nunes (1502–1578), mathematician, cosmographer, and professor
- Jacob Rodrigues Pereira (1715–1780), irst teacher of deaf-mutes in France.
- Daniela Ruah (1983–), actress, dual American citizen
- Isaac Henrique Sequeira (1738–1816), Lisbon-born French doctor.
- Francisco Sanches (1550 – November 16, 1623), Portuguese born, Spain raised, French skeptic philosopher and physician.
- José Maria Espírito Santo Silva Ricciardi (1954–), economist and banker.
- David ben Solomon ibn Yahya (1425–1528), rabbi sentenced by King João II to be burned at the stake fled to Corfu.
- Jacob Tirado (1540–1620), founder of the Spanish-Portuguese community of Amsterdam.
- Fernando Ulrich (1952–), economist and banking administrator.
- Samuel Usque (1500–1555), author.
- Richard Zimler (1956–), American-born author, dual-citizen.

== Spain ==
=== Pre-expulsion ===
- Petrus Alphonsi, 11th & 12th century physician, writer, astronomer, and polemicist.
- Vidal Astori (15th century) merchant and silversmith.
- Bonafos Caballeria (?-1464), historian and anti-Jewish writer.
- Abraham Cresques (1325–1387), cartographer.
- Jehudà Cresques (1360–1410), cartographer.
- Alfonso de Cartagen (1384–1456), Roman Catholic bishop, diplomat, historian and writer of pre-Renaissance Spain.
- Moses Hamon (1490–1567) physician, historian and phlanthopoist.
- Joseph ben Hayyim Jabez (15th & 16th century), mystic and theologian.
- Felipe Godínez (1588–1637), Portuguese born dramatist of the Spanish Golden Age.
- Jacob ibn Jau (9th century), silk-manufacturer and held a position in the court of the Hisham II.
- Judah ben Joseph ibn Ezra (12th century), physician.
- Joseph Kimhi (1105–1170), rabbi and biblical commentator.
- Antonio de León Pinelo (1589–1660), writer and historian.
- Moses de León (1240–1305), rabbi and Kabbalist who is considered the composer or redactor of the Zohar. =
- Isaac ben Moses Eli (15th century), mathematician.
- Caterina Tarongí (1646–1691), burned alive by the Spanish Inquisition.
- Bartolomé de Torres Naharro (1845–1530), writer.
- Solomon ibn Verga (1460–1554), historian and physician.
- Joseph Zabara (1140–1200), physicist, poet and satirist, writer of the Book of Delights'.
- Abraham Zacuto (1452-c.1515), astronomer
- Francisco Perea (1620 – ?), first-generation son of Sephardic Jews exiled from Spain in Peru

=== Post-expulsion ===
- Isak Andic (1953–), Turkish-born businessman and founder Mango.
- Miguel de Barrios (1625–1701), philosopher, historian and poet.
- Nissan Ben-Avraham (1957–), Marrano rabbi.
- Esther Bendahan (1964–), Moroccan born author.
- Elena Benarroch (1955–), fashion designer.
- Doris Benegas (1951–2016), Venezuelan-born political lawyer, half Jewish.
- José María Benegas (1948–2015), Venezuelan-born politician for the Spanish Socialist Workers' Party, half Jewish.
- Ricardo Bofill (1939–), world famous architect, half Jewish.
- Rafael Cansinos-Asséns (1882–1964), poet, novelist, essayist, literary critic and translator.
- Abraham Miguel Cardoso (1626–1706), Sabbatean prophet and physician.
- Isaac Carasso (1874–1939), Ottoman born co-founder of Danone.
- Daniel Carasso (1905–2009), Ottoman born co-founder of Danone
- Pancracio Celdrán (1942–2019), professor, intellectual and journalist who specializes in history & literature of antiquity & the medieval period.
- Claudio Guillén (1924–2007), French-born writer and historian, half Jewish.
- Heinrich Gärtner (1885–1962), Austro-Hungarian-born cinematographer.
- Andrés Herzog (1974–), politician and lawyer;spokesperson of the Union, Progress and Democracy (UPyD), half Jewish.
- Jon Juaristi (1951–), poet, essayist and translator, self-confessed former ETA militant. Convert.
- Alicia Koplowitz (1954–), businesswoman and philanthropist, half Jewish.
- Esther Koplowitz (1953–), businesswoman and philanthropist, half Jewish.
- Enrique Múgica Herzog (1932–), lawyer, politician and co-founder of Spanish Socialist Workers' Party, half-Jewish.
- Romeo Niram (1974–), figurative painter.
- Eduardo Propper de Callejón (1895–1972), diplomat remembered for facilitating escape of tens of thousands of Jews from France, half Jewish.
- Samuel Toledano (1929–1996), Moroccan-born Jewish lawyer and Jewish community leader.
- Joseph de la Vega (1650–1692), well known merchant, poet, and philanthropist in Amsterdam.

== See also ==
- List of Sephardic Jews
- Sephardi Jews
- History of the Jews in Spain
- Spanish and Portuguese Jews
- Lists of Jews
- List of Portuguese
- List of Spaniards
