= Sacerdote =

Sacerdote is Italian, Spanish, and Portuguese for "priest." It may also refer to:

- Sacerdote (surname), Italian surname
- El sacerdote, a 1978 Spanish film

== See also ==
- Sacerdos (disambiguation)
- Sacerdotalis (disambiguation)
- Sacerdotalism, belief that propitiatory sacrifices for sin require the intervention of a priest
