= De la Caballeria =

De la Caballeria (or De la Cavallería), was a Sephardic family of Aragon, Spain, widely ramified, and influential through its wealth and scholarship, especially in Zaragoza. The family descended from Solomon ibn Labi de la Caballeria, who had nine sons.

The eldest, Bonafos Caballeria, was baptized, and all the others followed his example except Benveniste ben Labi. Bonafos and his brother Samuel took the name "Pedro" (Micer Pedro). Samuel Pedro attained to high clerical offices, while his brother Ahab-Felipe became a leader in the Cortes, and Isaac Fernando was assistant curator in the University of Zaragoza. The youngest brother, Luis, who was baptized as a little child, was appointed tesorero, mayor, or chief treasurer, by Juan of Navarre. The sons of Isaac Fernando were engaged in farming the public taxes, and through their wealth secured high positions in the state.

Pedro de la Caballeria negotiated the marriage of Queen Isabella I of Castile to Ferdinand II of Aragon, and had the honor of presenting to the royal bride a costly necklace, valued at 40,000 ducats, defraying part of the cost himself. Benveniste's son, Vidal de la Caballeria, and his wife Beatrice also embraced Christianity, taking the name "Gonzalo." One of Benveniste's daughters became the wife of the rich landowner Apres de Paternoy, a Sephardic man of Verdun, and their descendants were important in Spanish history.

Notwithstanding the high offices which this family filled, several of its members suffered from the persecutions of the Inquisition. Alfonso de la Caballeria of Zaragoza, who still maintained his connection with the large synagogue there, took part in the conspiracy against the inquisitor Arbues. The remains of Juan de la Caballeria were burned in Zaragoza, at which place, in 1488, Luis de la Caballeria, as well as his son Jaime and several other members of the family, was made to do public penance.

Bibliography: "Libro Verde," in Revista do España, vol. XVIII.

== See also ==
- Benveniste
