= Sacerdos (disambiguation) =

Sacerdos is Latin for "priest" or "priestess".

Sacerdos may also refer to:

- Quintus Tineius Sacerdos (c. 160 – aft. 219), Roman politician
- Marius Plotius Sacerdos (3rd century), Roman grammarian
- Sacerdos of Limoges (670–c. 720), French saint
- Sacerdos of Lyon (487–551), French saint
- Sacerdos of Saguntum (died c. 560), Spanish saint
- One of the Forty Martyrs of Sebaste

== See also ==
- Sacerdote (disambiguation)
- Ecce sacerdos magnus, an antiphon from the common liturgy
- Sarlat Cathedral, a Catholic church dedicated to Sacerdos of Limoges
