= Abramo dall'Arpa =

Abramo dall'Arpa (died 1566) was an Italian harpist and the likely grandfather of Abramino dall'Arpa. In 1542, he played the part of Pan in a dramatic production at the court of Mantua. He continued to serve the court under Guglielmo I Gonzaga in the 1550s and 1560s. Around 1560, Ferdinand I asked him to come to Vienna, where he instructed the emperor's children in music.
