= History of the Jews in San Marino =

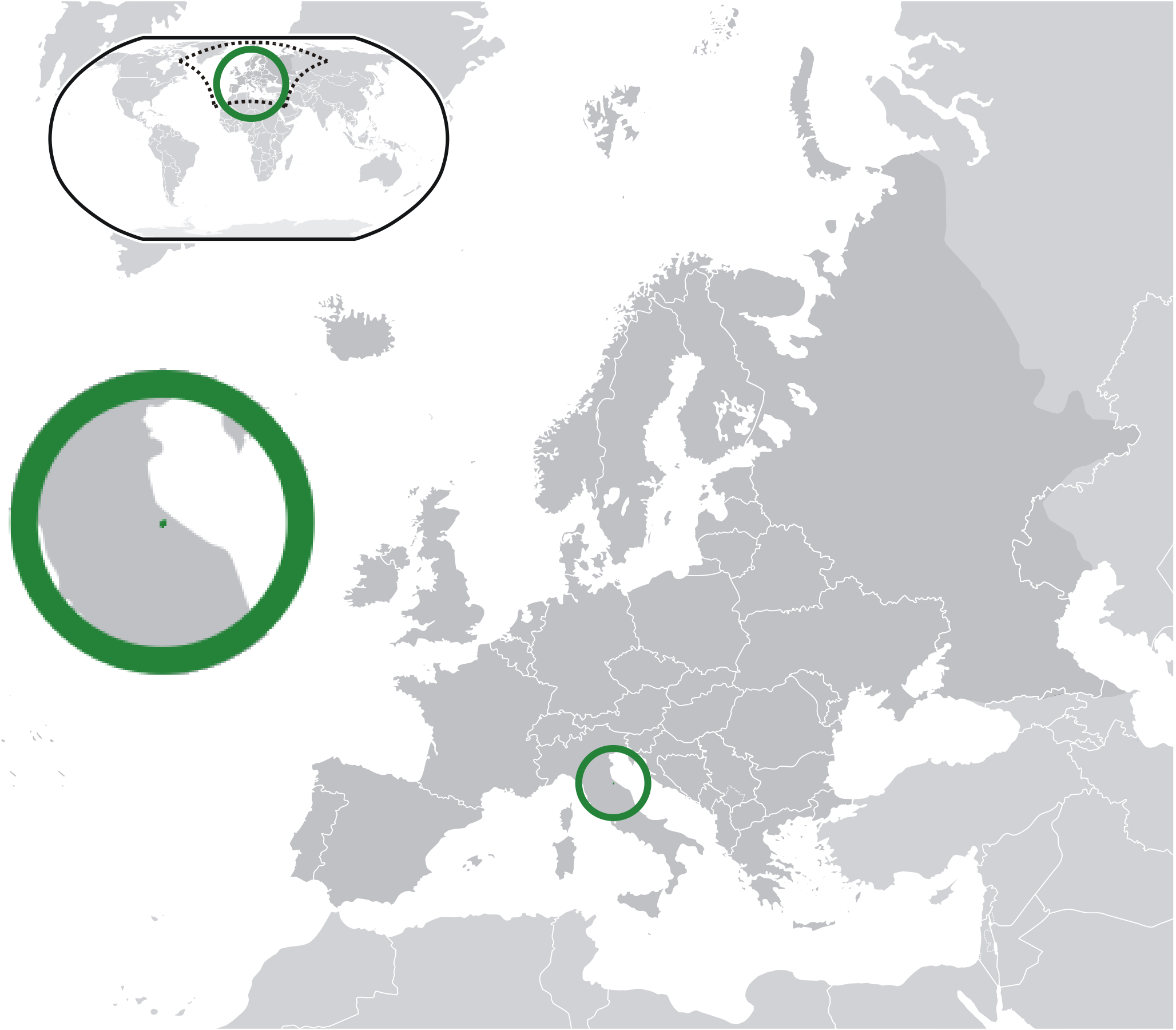
The location of San Marino (dark green, in circle) in Europe

Flag of San Marino

The history of the Jews in San Marino reaches back to the Middle Ages.

San Marino is a small landlocked country in central Italy. There has been a Jewish presence in San Marino for at least 600 years.

The first mention of Jews in San Marino dates to the late 14th century, in official documents recording the business transactions of Jews. There are many documents throughout the 15th to 17th centuries describing Jewish dealings and verifying the presence of a Jewish community in San Marino. Jews were required to wear special badges and live by specific restrictions, but were also afforded official protection from the government and never had to live in a ghetto.

In 1942 the ruling Sammarinese Fascist Party prohibited marriage between Jewish and non-Jewish Sammarinese under Sammarinese racial law n.33, and by the end of the year Giuliano Gozi ordered that all Sammarinese Jews be deported and jailed.

During World War II, San Marino provided a harbor for more than 100,000 Italians and Jews from Nazi and Italian persecution. Today, there are only small numbers of Jews in San Marino.

== See also ==
- History of the Jews in Italy
- Italian Jews
