= Asher Salah =

Israeli historian (born 1967)

Asher Salah (Hebrew: אשר סלאח; born 1967 in Florence, Italy) is an Israeli historian. He is one of the leading specialists in the literature of the Italian Jews, and a translator of Hebrew literature. He has written extensively in cinema studies and contemporary Middle East politics working as a columnist for several Italian newspapers.

== Education and teaching ==
Salah went to school in Spain, Argentina and Italy before entering the University of Geneva where he graduated in political philosophy. He received his Ph.D. in Paris with a thesis on Italian Jewish literature in the 18th century. He immigrated to Israel in 1991. He teaches at the Bezalel Academy of Art and Design in Jerusalem since 1998 and at the Hebrew University of Jerusalem from 1998 to 2005 and since 2008. He is a member of the ASSEI (Israeli Historical Association of Italian Jewish Studies), of the AISG (Associazione Italiana per lo Studio del Giudaismo) and of the AIS (Association of Israel Studies). He has been the president of the Swiss Union of Jewish Students (UEJS) from 1988 to 1990, MP of the European Union of Jewish Students, researcher for the Israel Democracy Institute, from 1997 to 1999 and he is presently vice-president of the Dante Alighieri Society in Jerusalem.

== Awards and fellowships ==
- 1991: Nahum Goldmann Fellowship, Moscow
- 1997: Deutscher Akademischer Austauschdienst (DAAD)
- 2002: Zanea et Cobilovici Fellowship, Casip-Cojasor, Paris
- 2005: First prize for the best short story, international competition “Energheia”, Matera
- 2008: silver medal of the International Society Dante Alighieri for his role in the diffusion of Italian Culture and Language.
- 2011-2012: Primo Levi Fellowship at the Herbert D. Katz Center for Advanced Judaic Studies, University of Pennsylvania
- 2013-2014: Erasmus Mundus Staff Fellowship (EMAIL II), Granada University, Spain

== Publications ==
Books

- Future’s Past: The Italian Futurism and its Influence, Gal Ventura & Asher Salah (eds.), January (2011), monographic issue of Bezalel E-Journal https://web.archive.org/web/20110204083411/http://bezalel.secured.co.il/zope/home/en/1292052032/
- La République des Lettres : Rabbins, médecins et écrivains juifs en Italie au XVIIIè, Brill, Leiden/Boston, 2007 (in French).
- "Viaggi, percorsi e stravaganze di un illuminista ebreo italiano": il caso di Samuele Romanelli, prefazione a Samuele Romanelli, Visioni d’Oriente, Asher Salah (ed.), La Giuntina, Firenze, 2006 (in Italian).
- La storia dell’altro: israeliani e palestinesi, Asher Salah, Barbara Bertoncin (Eds.), Pierre Vidal-Naquet (preface), Forlì, Una Città, 2003 (in Italian).
- La bandiera near: testimonianze e interviste da Israele sulla nuova sinistra, Asher Salah, Barbara Bertoncin, Francesco Papafava (Eds.), Forlì, Una Città, 2002 (in Italian).
- Bibliografia ebraico-sicula, Istituto Internazionale di Studi Ebraici, Enna, 2002 (in Italian).
- Historia veAtarim Yehudim beItalia (History and Places in Jewish Italy), Machon Zalman Shazar, Jerusalem, 2002 (in Hebrew).
- Israele Palestina, culture di frontiera, numero monografico delle Nuove Effemeridi 53, Asher Salah (ed.), 2001 (in Italian),
- Sabato Ambron & Amadio Abbina, Breve descrizione del viaggio in Terra Santa fatto l’anno 1747, Asher Salah & Paola Abbina (eds.), Roma, Litos, 2012.
- L’epistolario di Marco Mortara: un rabbino italiano tra riforma e ortodossia (Firenze: Giuntina, Collana Quaderni di Materia Giudaica, 2012.

Selected articles on Jewish literature and history

- “Rabbini e letterati nella Livorno del secolo dei Lumi”, in Livorno 1606-1806: luogo di incontro tra popoli e culture, Adriano Prosperi (ed.), Allemandi, Torino, 2009, pp. 187–210.
- “Shoshana-Rose Marzel, L'Esprit du chiffon. Le vêtement dans le roman français du XIXe siècle”, in Studi Culturali, aprile (2009), pp. 159–161.
- “Nota biobliografica” in Baruch Hagani, Vita di Teodoro Herzl, con prefazione del 1919 di Francesco Ruffini e introduzione di Luigi Compagna, Talete, Roma, 2008, pp. XV-XVIII.
- “Juifs, convertis et cabalistes dans l’Histoire de ma vie de Giacomo Casanova (1725-1798)”, in Culture Européenne et Kabbale, M. Burgada & Y. Dureau (eds.), L’Harmattan, Paris, 2008, pp. 257–300.
- “A Contextual Analysis of the Jewish Italian Elegy at the Time of the Ghettos (16th-18th centuries)”, in A Message upon the Garden: Studies in Medieval Jewish Poetry, Masha Izhaki & Alessandro Guetta (eds.)., Brill, Leiden/Boston, 2008, pp. 117–138.
- “Il resto di Israele: la letteratura degli ebrei in Italia del Settecento tra isolamento e integrazione”, in La Rassegna Mensile di Israel, LXXIII, No 3 (2007), pp. 97–110.
- “La Ketubbah come fonte per la conoscenza del rabbinato italiano nel Settecento”, in Mahberet Oshri, 2007, pp. 3–8 (in Italian and Hebrew)
- "’Bein Ghevule Ashkenaz VeItalia’: Elia Morpurgo nel contesto delle riforme scolastiche nelle Unite Contee di Gradisca e Gorizia tra Sette e Ottocento”, in Cultura ebraica nel Goriziano, Marco Grusovin (ed.), Istituto di Storia Sociale e Religiosa, Gorizia, 2007, pp. 101–123.
- “Ktiva Pratit Ukhtiva Tzibburit: Hibburim SheNikhtevu BeItalia BeIqvot Praot 1799”, in Qanoni Upopulari (Canonical and Popular: Literary Dialogues), Yael Shapira, Omri Herzog, Tamar Hess (eds.), Resling, Tel Aviv, 2007, pp. 99– 108, 227-231.
- ”Les Lumières: le siècle d’or de l’imprimerie en Italie”, in Cahiers du Judaïsme, A. Grinberg (ed.), 22 (2007), pp. 114–124.
- ”Qu'est-ce qu'une catastrophe pour un poète juif? L'élègie dans la poèsie hébraïque italienne a l'âge des ghettos (XVI-XVIII siècles)”, in Babel, Elegies, 12 (2005), pp. 51–77.
- ”Y-a t’il eu un roman juif? Roman et romanesque dans la littérature hébraïque du XVI au XVIIIème siècle”, in Babel, Rhéthoriques Méditerranéennes, J.-E. Bernard (ed.), N° 7 (2003), pp. 95–120.
- “Livorno: Elia Benamozegh”, in La Rassegna Mensile di Israel, Settembre-Dicembre, N° 3 (2000), pp. 113–124.
- “Israel Knohl’s The Masiach before Jesus”, in La Rassegna Mensile d’Israel, Maggio-Agosto, Vol. LXVI, N° 2 (2000).
- “The Otherness of the Self: on Samuel Romanelli’s Travelogue”, European Journal of Jewish Studies, 5,2 (2011), pp. 219–240.
- “Steinschneider and Italy”, in Studies on Moritz Steinschneider (1816–1907), Gad Freudenthal & Reimund Leicht (eds.), Leyden/Bosto, Brill, 2011, pp. 411–456.
- “Tra Padova e Berlino: il carteggio di Samuel David Luzzatto e Moritz Steinschneider”, La Rassegna Mensile di Israel, 74,3 (2008), pp. 11–52.
- “How Should a Rabbi Be Dressed? The Question of Rabbinical Attire in Italy from Renaissance to Emancipation (Sixteenth–Nineteenth Centuries)”, in Fashioning Jews: Clothing, Culture, and Commerce (Leonard Greenspoon ed.), Purdue University Press, (2013)
- “Morte e catastrofi nell’elegia ebraica italiana all’epoca dei ghetti”, Materia Giudaica: Rivista dell’associazione italiana per lo studio del giudaismo, XVII-XVIII (2012-2013): 155-168.
- “A Matter of Quotation: Dante and the Literary Identity of Jews in Italy”, Italia Judaica, eds. Joseph Shatzmiller & Shlomo Simonsohn (Leiden/Boston: Brill, (2012): 167-199.
- “Haskalah Be-Italia (Haskalah in Italy)”, in Italia, ed. Roni Weinstein (Jerusalem: Ben Zvi Institute) (2012): 133-142
- “Liturgy of Portugal Conversos”, in Hebrew Literature and Bible in the Andalusi Tradition in the 15th Century, eds. Arturo Prats & Jonathan Decter (Leyden/Boston: Brill) (2012): 201-222

Selected articles on film studies

- “Futurismo e cinema”, in Future’s Past: The Italian Futurism and its Influence, History & Theory: The Protocols (Gal Ventura & Asher Salah eds.), January, 2011 E-Journal https://web.archive.org/web/20110204083411/http://bezalel.secured.co.il/zope/home/en/1292052032/
- “Lo Stato d’Israele nell’immaginario cinematografico italiano”, in Roma e Gerusalemme. Israele nella vita politica e culturale italiana (1949–2009), Marcella Simoni & Arturo Marzano (eds.), Genova, ECIG, 2010, pp. 75–96.
- “I perseguitati? Un fardello di redenzione”, in Pagine ebraiche, 11 (2010), p. 35.
- “Il cinema israeliano di animazione”, in Il cinema israeliano contemporaneo, Maurizio De Bonis, Ariel Schweitzer, Giovanni Spagnoletti (eds.), Marsilio, Venezia, 2009, pp. 195–206.
- “Tradizione e modernità nel cinema israeliano”, in Ebraismo, D. Bidussa & M. Luzzatto (eds.), Einaudi, Torino, 2008, pp. 326–353.
- “Le sable dans le cinéma d’Uri Zohar”, in Tel Aviv : Cent ans d’architecture, Yod, revue de l’INALCO, Masha Yitzhaki (ed.), 13 (2008), pp. 301–313.
- “Exodus: The Italian Version”, in Jerusalem Film Festival, 2008, p. 32.
- "Nokhehim Nifqadim : HaYehudim BaQolnoa HaItalqi”, in Italia Ebraica : Lemaala meAlpaim Shnot Mifgash Bein HaTarbut HaItalqit LeYahadut, Museon Eretz Israel, Tel Aviv, 2008, pp. 259–266 (a Hebrew version of the previous article)
- “Maschere Giudaiche: gli ebrei al cinema italiano”, in Italia Ebraica: oltre duemila anni di incontro tra la cultura italiana e l’ebraismo, Allemandi, Torino, 2007, pp. 221–235.
- “The other place in Italian Cinema: Matera and Lucania - HaMaqom HaAher BaQolnoa HaItalqi: Matera VeEzor Lucania”, in Jerusalem Cinematheque, May (2006), p. 5 (in Hebrew).
- “Roma set mundi– Ir HaNetzah BaQolnoa”, in Jerusalem Cinematheque, May (2004), p. 3 (in Hebrew).
- “Stranieri in patria: l’invisibile frontiera nel cinema israeliano e palestinese della seconda intifada”, in Catalogo della 53a edizione della mostra internazionale del cortometraggio, Montecatini, 2002, pp. 112–121.
- “Tre prospettive su Gerusalemme: Marcello Piacentini, Chris Marker, Paul Celan”, in Arts and Artists in Israel and Palestine, Palazzo delle Papesse, Siena, 2000, pp. 20–26; 135-137 (in Italian and English).
- “Maurizio Zinni: Fascisti di celluloide. La memoria del ventennio nel cinema italiano (1945-2000) (Venezia: Marsilio, 2010)”, Il mestiere di storico, 43 (2011), pp. 236.
- “Alan O’Leary, Tragedia all’italiana: Italian Cinema and Italian Terrorism, 1970-2010 (Bern, Peter Lang,(2011); Austin Fisher, Radical Frontiers in the Spaghetti Western: Politics, Violence and Popular Italian Cinema (London: Tauris, 2011); Donatella Spinelli Coleman, Filming the Nation: Jung, Film, Neo-Realism and Italian National Identity (London: Routledge,(2011)”, Il mestiere di storico 44/2 (2012): 70-7.
- “Jews and Israel in Italian Cinema”, in Italy 150th Anniversary (Milano: Corriere della Sera Foundation,(2012): 283-301

Selected articles on Israel

- “La philosophie israélienne face a la guerre”, in Philosophie et pensées juives : histoire et actualité, A. Guetta (ed.), Yod, 15 (2010), pp. 317–344 (a French version of a previous article in Italian).
- “Orgoglio e pregiudizio : osservazioni contro il boicottaggio delle università israeliane”, in Una Città, 148 (2007), pp. 22–23.
- “Un manuale per le scuole israeliane e palestinesi”, in La storia dell’altro: israeliani e palestinesi. Seminario della fondazione Querini e Stampalia del 24 marzo 2004, Venezia, 2006, pp. 21–28.
- “Lo spazio bianco della storia”, in Verifiche, Aprile, 2 (2006), pp. 18–21.
- “La filosofia israeliana di fronte alla guerra”, in Conflitti, a cura di Alessandro Alienzo e Dario Caruso, Libreria Dante e Descartes, Napoli, 2005, pp. 465–484.
- “Pace, dialogo, tolleranza: le parole sono importanti”, in Gli argomenti Umani, sinistra e innovazione, Giugno, N° 6 (2003), pp. 56–59.
- “Guerra o pace? Per chi facciamo il tifo”, in Keshet, rivista dell’ebraismo laico, Anno II, Settembre-Ottobre, N° 1-2 (2003), pp. 21–24.
- “L’archeologia del futuro: paradigmi della nuova storia israeliana”, in Le nuove effemeridi, N. 53 (2001), pp. 6–21.
- “Accademia Bezalel: una serra di creativita’”, Pagine ebraiche, novembre, 2013
- "Studi ebraici, 22 voci non possono bastare", Pagine ebraiche, ottobre, 2013
- "Comics & Jews - Israele allo specchio della graphic novel", Pagine ebraiche, novembre, 2012
- "Witz & Humor - Ilarita' ebraica. Dal piccolo al grande schermo", Pagine ebraiche, marzo, 2011
- “The Book: Food, Drink, Air to Breath?”, Catalogue of Chanan de Lange Exhibit on Book-shelves (Tel Aviv: 2011)
- “I perseguitati? Un fardello di redenzione”, Pagine Ebraiche, Novembre 2010

Book translations

- Formica Enrico, Cassuto David & Peres Shimon, Gerusalemme a 360 gradi, Hever, Ivrea, 2008.
- Kleiman Ephraim & Shapira Anita, Brutti ricordi: il dibattito in Israele sulle espulsioni di palestinesi nel 1948-1949, Una Città, Forlì, 2007.
- Romanelli Samuele, Visioni d’Oriente, La Giuntina, Firenze, 2006 (from Hebrew to Italian)
- Veronesi Sandro, Hayav HaAherim (La forza del passato), Keren, Tel Aviv, 2005 (from Italian to Hebrew)
- Lattes Yaaqov Andrea, Sull'assimilazione in Italia ed i metodi per affrontarla, Bar Ilan, Ramat Gan, 2005 (from Hebrew to Italian)
- Bar-On Dan, Adwan Sami, La storia dell’altro, Una Città, Forlì, 2003 (from Hebrew and Arabic)
- Yehoshua A.B., Lettore allo specchio. Autobiografie, diari, interviste, Einaudi, Torino, 2003 (from Hebrew to Italian).
- Yehoshua A.B., La terribile forza di una piccola colpa, sette saggi su morale e letteratura, Einaudi, Torino, 2000 (from Hebrew to Italian)
- Siddur (libro di preghiera) bilingue italiano-ebraico di Shabbat e Kippur, DLI, Milano, 1998 (in cooperation with Annalisa Bernardi).
- Rabbi Najman de Breslev, Animo, editora Breslev, Jerusalem, 1994 (from French to Spanish)

== Sources ==
- https://web.archive.org/web/20060514164606/http://www.keshet.it/rivista/sett-ott-03/pag4.htm
- http://www.verifiche.ch/index.cfm?scheda=251%5B%5D
- https://web.archive.org/web/20091001184747/http://www.unacitta.it/pagineinternazionalismo/letteraboicottaggioAsher.html
- http://www.brill.nl/product_id26645.htm%5B%5D
- http://www.giuntina.it/dettautori.asp?AutoreId=302
- https://web.archive.org/web/20091230160110/http://www.energheia.org/dblog/storico.asp?s=&m=&pagina=5&ordinamento=desc
