= Moses David Vali =

Jewish biblical commentator, physician, scholar, and Kabbalist from Italy

Moses David Valle
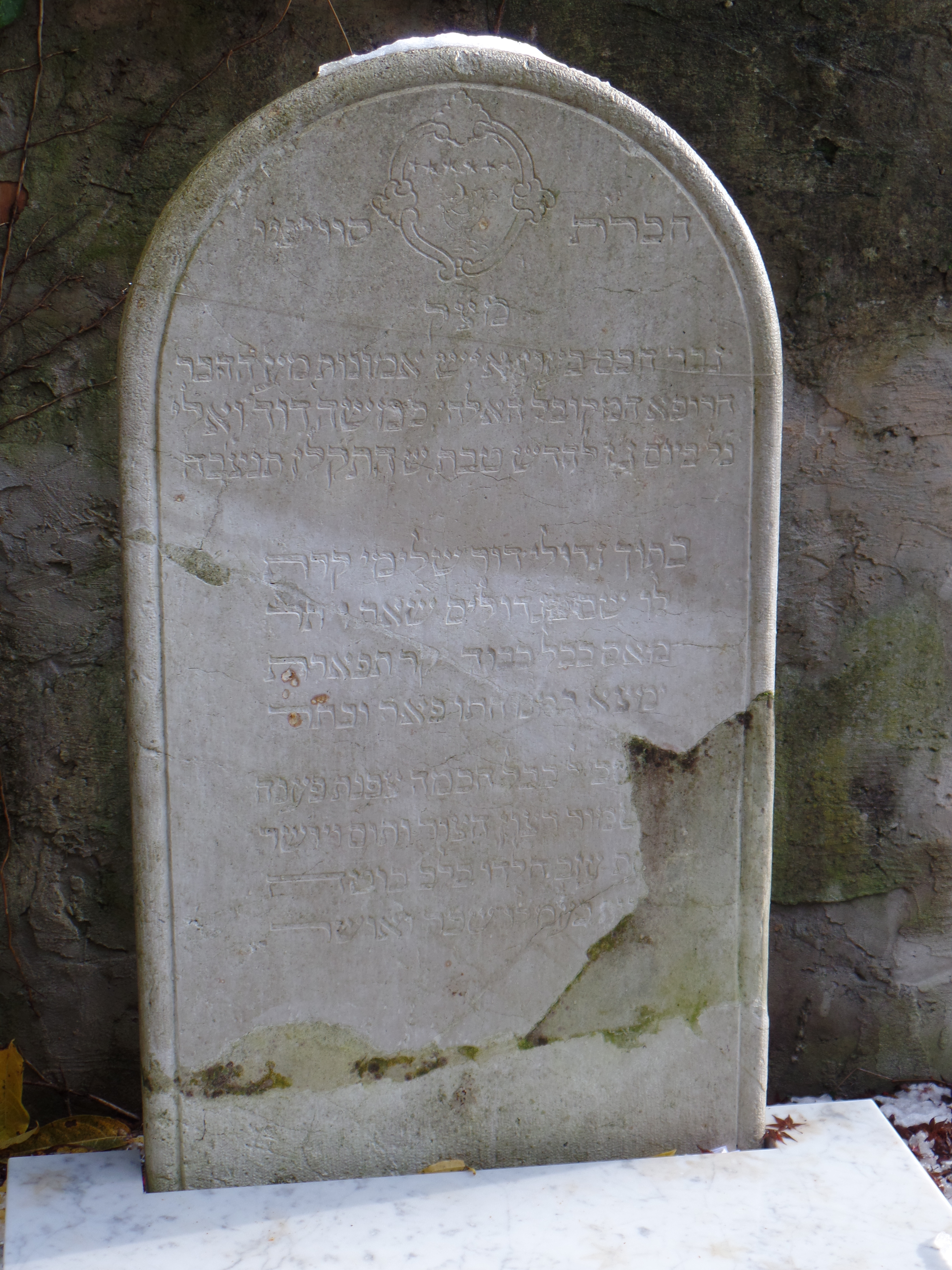
- Tombstone of Rabbi Moses David Valle
- Born: circa 1697
- Died: 17 December 1776 (age 78); Padua, Italy
- Occupations: Biblical commentator, physician, scholar, Kabbalist
- Known for: Commentary on the Bible, medical writings, Kabbalistic teachings

Rabbi Moses David Valle (circa 1697 – December 17, 1776) was a Jewish biblical commentator, physician, scholar, and Kabbalist from Italy. He lived in the city of Padua and was a disciple of Rabbi Menachem Azariah da Fano. According to the researcher Joseph Almanzi, Rabbi Valle was a student and disciple of Rabbi Menachem Azariah da Fano in the field of Kabbalah during his early studies.

== Biography ==
Rabbi Valle was born to Rabbi Samuel and studied with rabbis in Padua, along with Rabbi Menachem Azariah da Fano. Both of them were ordained as rabbis on the eve of Sukkot in the year 5426 (1665). When Rabbi Menachem Azariah da Fano established his group in the year 5477 (1716), Rabbi Valle was one of the leaders of the group and later became its leader. Rabbi Valle was a polymath with extensive knowledge in the Bible, philosophy, medicine, and more. He also studied medicine at the University of Padua. At the age of 25, he wrote a treatise in Italian on Christianity titled "I Sette Giorni della Verit" and authored numerous writings on the Bible, comprising around 15,000 pages, some of which are in manuscript form.

In his writings, Rabbi Valle's style is associative and less structured. He also mentioned teachings he received from Rabbi Menachem Azariah da Fano. Additionally, his writings show the influence of Rabbi Abraham Abulafia's Kabbalistic teachings.

According to his view, the wisdom of ancient times was mostly true compared to the contemporary wisdom of his time, which he considered largely false. He supported the theory of "Four Humors" and the medical approach of Galen, Hippocrates, and Avicenna, which he believed were beneficial in essence and occasionally harmful, as opposed to the chemical medicine that he considered harmful, sometimes beneficial, but not in essence.

If you say that wisdom must be adapted to its recipients, and that ancient wisdom was good for the ancients but new wisdom is needed for modern people, know that this is a difficult path because truth never changes in all generations. Therefore, one should not replace the wisdom of our ancestors with anything, but only make a slight change in the quantity of medicine, not in its quality, because the nature and temperament of people have weakened, and they cannot endure the abundance of remedies as in ancient times.

— Sefer HaLikutim 1

Rabbi Moses David Valle died on the 7th of Tevet, 5477 (1776), and was buried in the cemetery on Via Domenico Campagnola 24 in Padua. His tombstone bears the inscription:

Here lies the esteemed sage, the divine physician, the Kabbalist, the holy Rabbi Moses David Valle, may his memory be blessed, who passed away on Tuesday, the 7th of the month of Tevet, in the year 5477.

== Personal life ==
According to his writings, he had a son with his wife and named him Samuel Chaim after his father.

== Works ==
- Commentary on the entire Torah and Tanakh from a Kabbalistic perspective. These writings, along with others, were published by Rabbi Joseph Spinner.
- **Sefer HaLikutim**: Various writings on different topics, including segulot (spiritual remedies) and medicine.
- Parts of his writings on "Hazonut" (visions) were published by Isaiah Teshuvi within the Book of Jubilees by Solomon Pinnes in 5720 (1960), pages 441–472.
- **Commentary on the Book of Obadiah**: Published in the journal "Tzfunot" (vol. 3, June–July 1952), pages 138–142, and vol. 11 (Tammuz-Av 1962), pages 145–152.
