= Vidal Astori =

Sephardic silversmith and merchant

Vidal Astori, born in Valencia in the 15th century, was a Sephardic silversmith and merchant. He worked for the court of Ferdinand the Catholic between 1467 and 1469. With time he would reach the prestigious rank of "silversmith of the king," a status he would preserve after Ferdinand's union with Isabella of Castile.

== Biography and business ==
Vidal Astori's place of birth is not clear, but it was probably the city of Sagunto, where his workshop was located. The judería of Sagunto was one of the largest of Aragon. It included various institutions for social beneficence and a school for Talmudic studies, opened with direct permission of Doña María, Ferdinand's mother.

The local Jewish population of Sagunto had traditionally made their living either through silver crafting or through slavery. and those were the main commercial venues he would take during his life.

Vidal was the most prestigious member of a long tradition of silversmiths of the Jewish faith that went back over a century, which earned him the title of Royal Silversmith of Aragon, and Ferdinand's trust.

During Ferdinand's marriage, he was recommended as rabí of the shared court of Isabella and Ferdinand by Ferdinand, against Abraham Seneor. Ferdinand was disappointed when Seneor was elected instead, but he chose to respect the internal hierarchy of the aljamas and accepted the decision.

In 1480 he received a special permission from King Ferdinand to visit Castile and Portugal and conduct business both in the king's name, and in his own.

He established his son, Jahuda, as his agent in Portugal, and his other son, Samuel, as his agent in Valencia. They presumably exported silverwork and Movedre wine to Portugal, and imported black slaves acquired by the Portuguese merchants in west Africa. The Astori family sold 19 black slaves between 1484 and 1485, for a total of 10,575 sous. In 1486 their business was cut abruptly when the bailiff general issued a decree forbidding the purchase of African slaves from Guinea "lest their Christianization be impeded".

He is mentioned in 1487, in an Aragonese court ruling, in which Mexte, a Muslim woman, agrees to become his slave for four years in exchange for the pardon of some debts her husband had with the crown.

Vidal had also made himself a vital part of the Jewish effort to economically revitalize the area of the Palancia river. By 1487 the effort was paying off and the area had become a successful Jewish community. The community was temporarily exiled for two years by the Inquisition, due to tensions in the Mediterranean.

Vidal died in 1490 due to natural causes, before he could return.
