= Sacerdotalis =

Sacerdotalis may refer to:

- Crassispira sacerdotalis, a species of small predatory sea snail, a marine gastropod mollusk in the family Pseudomelatomidae, the turrids and allies
- Ordinatio sacerdotalis (Latin for "priestly ordination"), an apostolic letter by Pope John Paul II discussing the Roman Catholic Church's position requiring the reservation of priestly ordination to men alone
- Sacerdotalis caelibatus (Latin for "priestly celibacy"), an encyclical written by Pope Paul VI explaining and defending the Catholic Church's tradition of clerical celibacy in the West
- Fraternitas Sacerdotalis Sancti Petri, the Latin name of the Priestly Fraternity of Saint Peter
- Societas Sacerdotalis Sancti Pii Quinti, the Latin name of the Society of Saint Pius V
- Fraternitas Sacerdotalis Sancti Pii X, the Latin name of the Society of Saint Pius X
