= Romeo Niram =

Spanish-Romanian painter (born 1974)

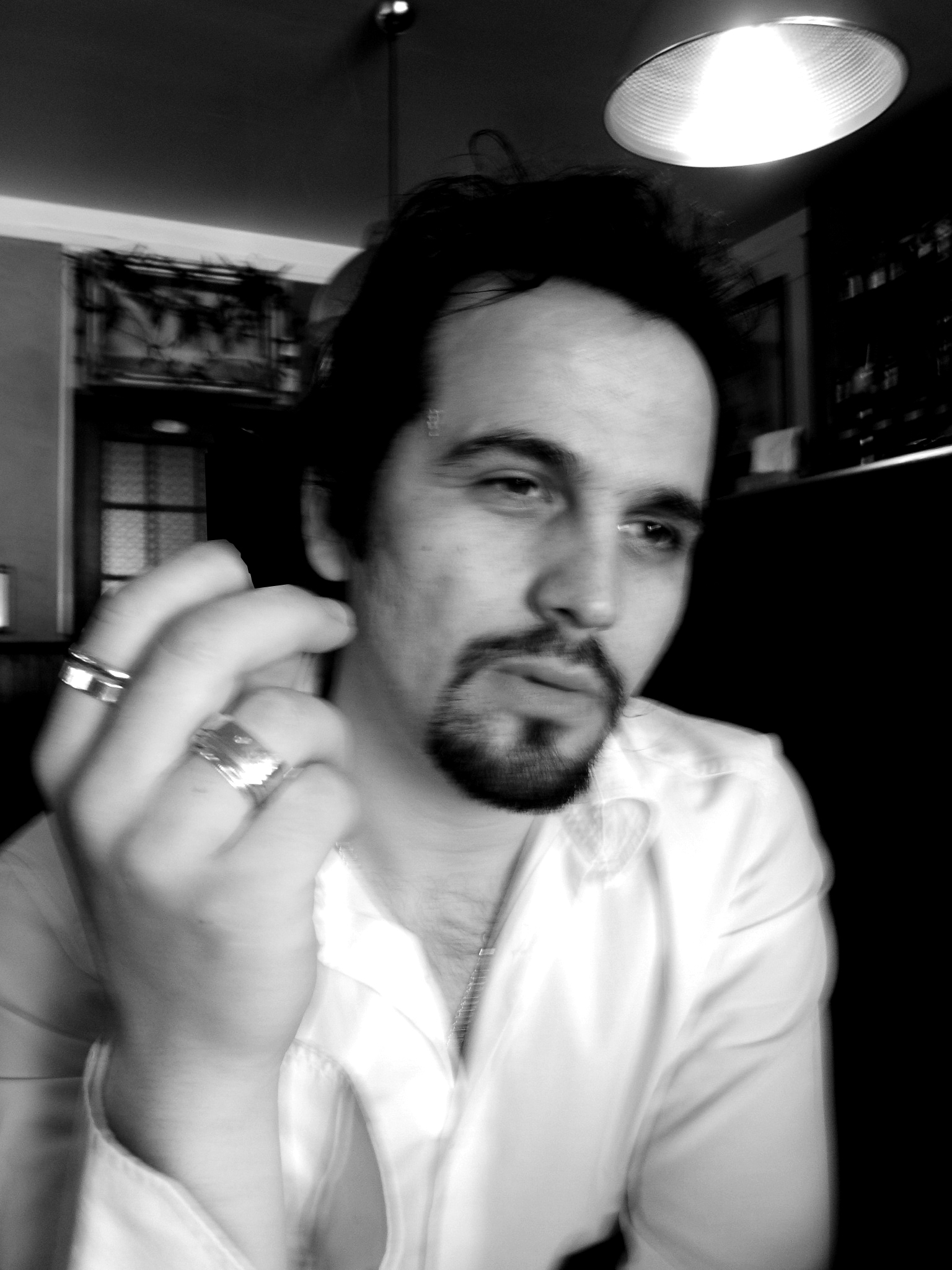
Romeo Niram

Romeo Niram (born 1974 in Bucharest, Romania) is a figurative painter of Jewish origin, living as of 2021 and working in Madrid, Spain.

== Art ==
Romeo Niram's artistic work is connected to physics above all, but also to philosophy, theology, literature, and cinema.

His work was presented in the series "Brâncuși E=mc2" at the conference "Art and Physics" in Tel Aviv, organized by the cultural association New Vision Rromani. The series identifies similarities in between physics and sculpture, in Albert Einstein's cosmology and Constantin Brâncuși's art.

In 2008, a thesis on his series "Diary - Mircea Eliade – Essay" was presented by art critic Begoña Fernández Cabaleiro at the International Congress of Art History, University of Murcia, Spain.

== Selected artwork ==
At the invitation of the Reales Tercios General Manuel Fuentes Cabrera, Romeo Niram painted in 2009 the portrait of Prince Felipe and Princess Leticia of Spain, and offered the painting to the couple on their 5th wedding anniversary. The painting is entitled "The Gate of the Kiss of Asturias". Its frame was made by Bogdan Ater; it represents Brâncuși's sculpture The Gate of the Kiss.

== Cultural activity ==
In 2004, Niram founded in Lisbon "Diaspora", the first bilingual cultural newspaper in Portugal.

In Spain, he founded the fine arts magazine “Niram Art”, which received several awards for cultural journalism (Best Arts Magazine) from the Movement for Contemporary Art in Portugal. The magazine contains articles in four languages, also in English.

In 2008, he founded "Espacio Niram", a cultural and artistic venue and art gallery in Madrid. Espacio Niram was also recognised in 2010 by MAC Lisboa for its contribution in support of arts in general and of young artists and writers from the Iberian Peninsula.

In 2010, he founded Niram Art Publishing House, which has published books of essay, fiction, poetry and art. The Niram Art Awards were established, given each year to both young and established artists, writers and other personalities from Spain, France, Israel, Romania, Mexico.

In 2009, Romeo Niram was invited to become part of the Spanish group "Reales Tercios", a military chivalric order which date back to the Middle Ages, which now promotes arts and culture.

In September 2009, Romeo Niram was decorated for his artistic and cultural merits by the Reales Tercios.
