= Abramino dall'Arpa =

Italian harpist

Abramino dall'Arpa (fl ca. 1577–1593) was an Italian harpist and the likely grandson of Abramo dall'Arpa. He was one of the few Jewish musicians in Mantua in the late 16th century. In 1587, he accompanied and comforted the dying Guglielmo I Gonzaga on a trip to Goito.
