= Donato Sacerdote =

Italian Jewish poet

Donato Sacerdote (Italian pronunciation: [doˈnaːto satʃerˈdɔːte], 1820–1883) was an Italian and Jewish poet.

== Life ==
Sacerdote was born at Fossano in 1820. He died there on 27 November 1883. Passionately devoted to the classics, Sacerdote from his early youth applied himself to the comparative study of the works of Aeschylus, Sophocles, and Euripides and those of Vittorio Alfieri and Del Monti.

== Work ==
Among Sacerdote's better-known dramas are "Bianca Cappello," which was represented with great success at the Alfieri Theater, Turin, in 1874; "Cola di Rienzo"; "Catilina," a tragedy in five acts; and "Eglon," a dramatic poem in five acts, relying heavily on Biblical inspiration. Sacerdote was also an accomplished writer of sonnets, odes, and songs.

That entry was written by Isidore Singer and Flaminio Servi.
