= Bonafos Caballeria =

Bonafos Caballeria (died 1464) was an anti-Jewish writer. He was the son of Solomon ibn Labi de la Caballeria of Zaragoza and assumed the name of "Micer Pedro" upon converting to Christianity. From his early youth he devoted himself to the study of Hebrew, Arabic and Latin languages, and gradually acquired a profound knowledge of civil and Canon law. He won the favor of Queen Maria, who appointed him commissioner of the Cortes which convened at Monzón and Alcañiz (1436–37); and all the liberties and privileges which the Caballeria family had enjoyed for a long time were confirmed to him and his descendants. Caballeria was twice married: first (before his conversion) to the former wife of Luis de Santángel, who obstinately resisted baptism, and then to Violente, a daughter of the wealthy Alfonso Ruiz of Daroca, who, like Caballeria, was a convert to Christianity.

In 1450, Micer Pedro began his Zelus Christi Contra Judæos et Sarracenos, a book full of malevolence against his former coreligionists. This work, upon which he was engaged for fourteen years, was published at Bologna in 1592 by Martin Alfonso Vivaldo, who added numerous annotations showing his hostility to the Jewish race. Soon after the completion of this work, in which he falsely accused the Jews of every imaginable vice, branding them as a cursed seed and a hypocritical, pestilential, and abandoned race, Pedro was murdered (1464), the deed having been committed, it is believed, at the instigation of Marranos.

All the sons of Pedro occupied high positions in Aragon; Alfonso being vice-chancellor, Luis confidential adviser of King John, and Jaime counselor and confidential adviser of Don Ferdinand, accompanying the latter on his first visit to Naples, and traveling by his side in princely splendor. Nevertheless, Jaime in 1504, became a victim of the Inquisition, and was sentenced at Zaragoza. Another member of the family, Martin de la Caballeria, was invested with the command of the fleet at Mallorca.

== See also ==
- Racial antisemitism
