= Cibola =

Cibola most commonly refers to:

- Cevola (sometimes Sevola) or Cibola, the Spanish transliteration of a native name for a pueblo (Hawikuh Ruins) conquered by Francisco Vázquez de Coronado
- One of the Seven Cities of Gold, the Spanish legend that Coronado tracked to Hawikuh
- The Zuni-Cibola Complex, which contains the Hawikuh Ruins
- Cibola County, New Mexico, where the Hawikuh Ruins are located
- The Cibola National Forest, a disjoint forest stretching from New Mexico to Oklahoma, including parts of Cibola County, New Mexico

It may also refer to:

- Cibola, Arizona
- Cibola High School (Albuquerque, New Mexico)
- Cibola High School (Yuma, Arizona)
- "Cibola", a 1966 episode of the TV series Daniel Boone
- Cibola Burn, a novel in The Expanse series

== See also ==
- Cebolla
- El Dorado
- Quivira, a city visited by Coronado in his quest for the mythical seven Cities of Gold
