= The Moor's Account =

2015 novel by Laila Lalami

The Moor’s Account
- Author: Laila Lalami
- Language: English
- Genre: Novel
- Publisher: Pantheon Books
- Publication date: 9 September 2014
- Publication place: United States
- Media type: Print (Hardcover and Paperback)
- Pages: 336 pp (hardback edition)
- ISBN: 978-0307911667 (hardback edition)

The Moor's Account is a novel by Laila Lalami. It was a Pulitzer Prize for Fiction finalist in 2015.

The Moor's Account is a fictional memoir of Estebanico, the Moroccan slave who survived the Narvaez expedition and accompanied Cabeza de Vaca. He is widely considered to be the first African explorer of America, but little is known about his early life except for one line in Cabeza de Vaca's chronicle: "The fourth [survivor] is Estebanico, an Arab Negro from Azamor."

== Plot ==
The story is narrated in the first person by Mustafa ibn Muhammad ibn Abdussalam al-Zamori, a Moroccan slave who has been taken by his Spanish master, Andrés de Dorantes, on an expedition to the New World. The expedition lands in Florida in the vicinity of what is now Tampa Bay. Under the leadership of Pánfilo de Narváez, the men leave their ships behind and travel inland to look for gold. As they journey northward, they face resistance by indigenous tribes, suffer from disease and starvation, and quarrel with one another. Within a year there are only four survivors: Cabeza de Vaca, the treasurer of the expedition; Alonso del Castillo, a young nobleman, Andrés de Dorantes, one of the captains; and his Moroccan slave, Mustafa, whom the other three Spaniards refer to as Estebanico. Together, these four survivors travel westward, crossing the continent and living among indigenous tribes, reinventing themselves along the way as faith healers. Some years later, they are found by a party of Spanish slavers and brought to Mexico City, where they are asked to provide testimony about their journey—all except the slave, who tells his own story in the novel.

== Style ==
The Moor's Account is structured as a sixteenth-century Arabic travelogue. To give the impression of historical authenticity without making the novel inaccessible to contemporary readers, Lalami decided to use words that belong to the register of the 16th century, but are still in use today. She avoided contractions because they appear too modern.

Since the narrator is of Arabic origin, features typical of Arabic texts are used. Thus, the narrator begins his account with a basmala, notes the passage of time according to the Hijri calendar, uses Arabic units of measurement, and refers to places with their Arabic names. The dialogue in the novel lacks quotation marks in order to replicate the style of Arabic manuscripts of the 16th century.

In the first half of the novel, The Moor’s Account alternates between two sets of stories: some chronicling the Narváez expedition, and others narrating Mustafa’s life prior to his arrival in the New World.

== Awards and nominations ==
- 2015 Pulitzer Prize for Fiction finalist
- 2015 Man Booker Prize longlist
- 2015 American Book Award winner
- 2015 Arab American Book Award winner
- 2015 Hurston/Wright Legacy Award winner
- 2014 Langum Prize for American Historical Fiction Director's Mention
- 2014 The Wall Street Journal Best Books
- 2014 NPR Best Books
- 2014 New York Times Notable Books of the Year
- 2014 Kirkus Reviews Best Fiction Books
