= Chakwaina =

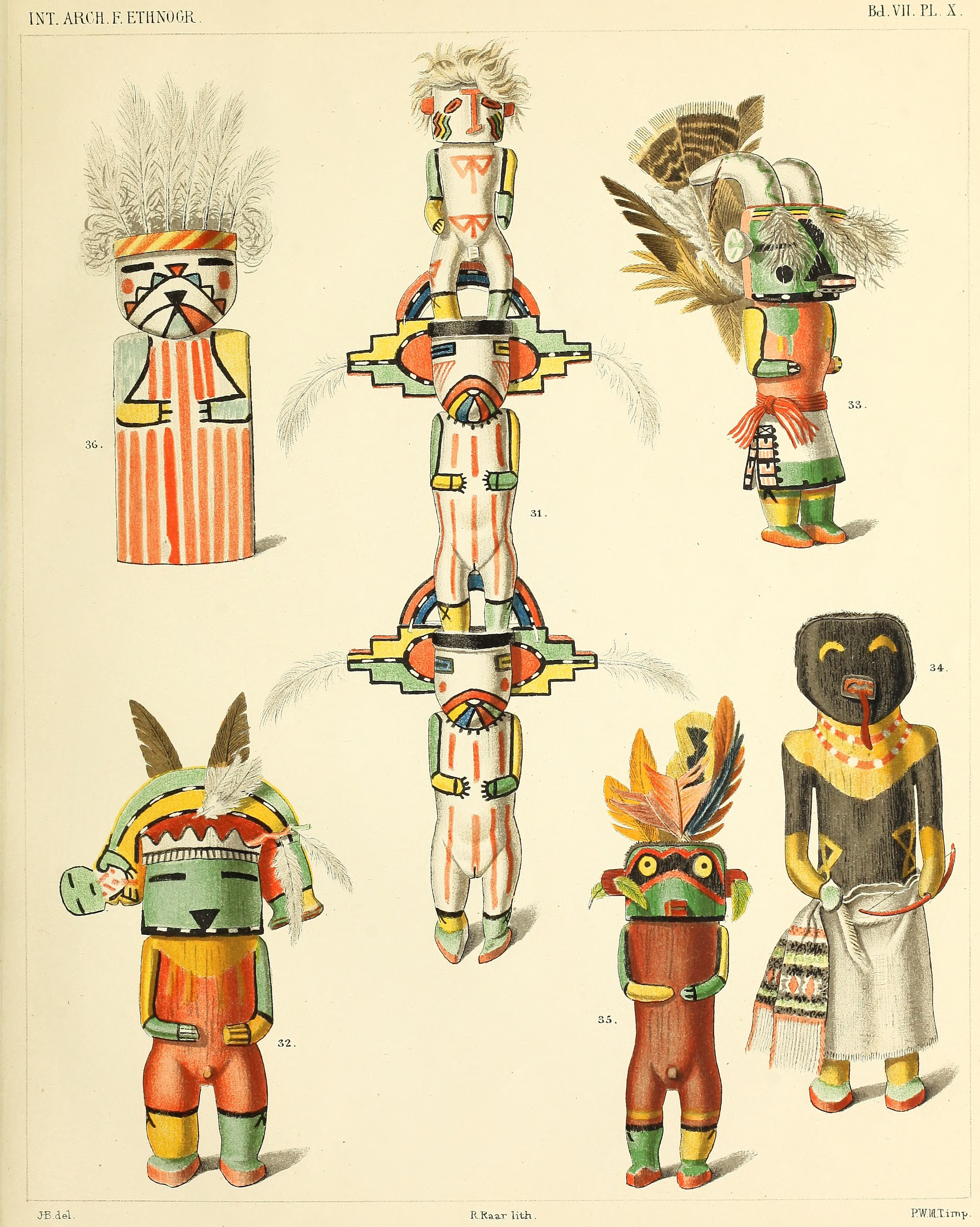
Number 34 on the bottom right is Chakwaina.

Chakwaina (alternatively Cha'kwaina, Tsa'kwayna, or Tcakwaina) is a kachina, or spirit, which appears in Hopi, Zuni, and Keresan ceremonies, but does not appear in Tewa ceremonies. Although imagery of the kachina is varied, it is usually depicted as an ogre, with ferocious teeth and a black goatee and black mask with yellow eyes. Its spread throughout Pueblo culture is often associated with the Asa clan.

It is often claimed that Chakwaina is a ceremonial representation of Estevanico, a Moroccan-born formerly-enslaved explorer who led the first Spanish party to the Pueblo tribes as a scout for the expedition of Fray Marcos de Niza. Early anthropologist, Frederick J. Dockstader asserted that legendary sources linked Chakwaina to contact with Estevanico. However, the linkage is not clear and the kachina may actually predate contact with the Spanish. In addition, although usually black, there are very few white or albino Chakwaina representations.
