= Dowa Yalanne =

Steep mesa in McKinley County, New Mexico

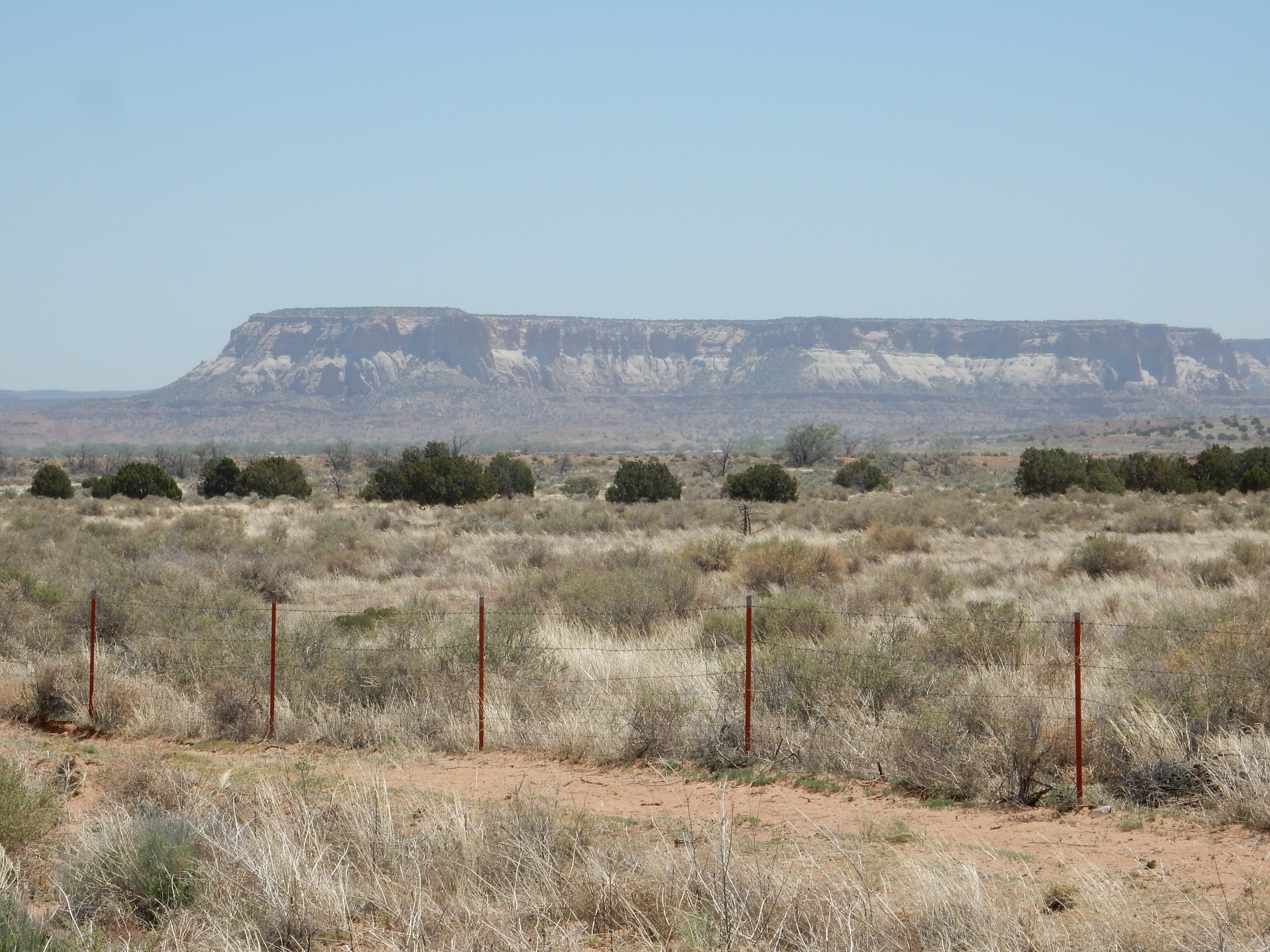
- Dowa Yalanne, the "Corn Mountain" of the Zuni people

Highest point
- Elevation: 7,274 ft (2,217 m) NGVD 29
- Coordinates: 35°03′10″N 108°47′32″W

Geography
- Location within New Mexico
- Location: McKinley County, New Mexico, U.S.
- Topo map: USGS Zuni

Dowa Yalanne or DY (Zuni: "Corn Mountain") is a steep mesa 3.1 miles (5 km) southeast of the present Pueblo of Zuni, on the Zuni Indian Reservation. Plainly visible from the Zuni Pueblo, the mesa is located in McKinley County, New Mexico, and has an elevation of 7,274 feet (2,217 m). The mesa is a sacred place for the Zuni people, who fled to the mesa top to escape the Coronado expedition in 1540, and it is closed to outside visitors.

== History ==
Dowa Yalanne was settled before European contact.

In 1540, Zuni people from the village of Hawikuu fled to the Dowa Yalanne mesa top to escape the attackers of the Coronado expedition. The 14 structures used as a refuge from the Spaniards between 1540 and 1680 were called Heshoda Ayahltona ("ancient buildings above").

Before the Pueblo Revolt of 1680, the Zuni lived in six different villages. After the revolt, until 1692, they took refuge in a defensible position atop Dowa Yalanne. About 48 Pueblo structures were built between 1680 and 1692 on the top of the mesa, which covers approximately 320 acres (130 ha). The population of Dowa Yalanne in 1680 is estimated to have been approximately 2500 people, living in buildings of one and two stories, with over 500 rooms.

On November 11, 1692, Don Diego de Vargas climbed to the top of Dowa Yalanne and baptized over 290 people.

After the establishment of peace and the return of the Spanish, the Zuni relocated to their present location, only briefly returning to the mesa top in 1703.

According to T.J. Ferguson,

The village on Dowa Yalanne was pivotal in the development of historic settlement patterns. It is the first village in which the whole Zuni population gathered into a single settlement. Although it is unlikely that the contact period villages were totally abandoned, apparently every Zuni family maintained a residence on top of Dowa Yalanne that could be used for refuge when the Spaniards returned. The mesa top was also a position defensible against the hostile attacks of the Apaches.

== Culture ==
Dowa Yalanne is sacred to the Zuni people. The mesa is a place for shrines and religious activities, and is closed to outside visitors. The rising sun reaches a spot on the southwest of the mesa at winter solstice. Dowa Yalanne is "mythologically associated with the 'House of the Gods and the making of rain, lightning, and thunder,' and from this came its alternate name, 'Thunder Mountain.' "

Other alternate names for the mesa have included To'wa Yäl'länne, Tay-a-ol-o-ne, Taaiyalone Mountain, Tâaiyá'hltona Hlúelawa, and "Peñol de Caquima," a Spanish pronunciation of the old village of Kyaki:ma, located at the base of the mesa. A traditional tale, "The Great Dancing Tarantula", takes place at the foot of Dowa Yalanne.

Dowa Yalanne Elementary school is located near the mesa. A program for Zuni youth, DY-MESA ("Developing Youth: Mentoring Empowerment Self-expression Achievement") is named after the mesa, as "a source of the strength for the Zuni Pueblo."

The aviary of the Zuni Eagle Sanctuary, which cares for injured golden and bald eagles, "was designed so the eagles could view the mesa from their cages."

== Geology ==
The red rock of the mesa is Entrada Sandstone, with white bands. The top layer of rock is Dakota Sandstone. The mesa's white Zuni Sandstone is the source of flat baking stones for "hewe", a paper-thin cornbread prepared for special occasions. Springs around the mesa are a traditional source of water.
