= Laila Lalami =

Moroccan-American writer, and professor (born 1968)

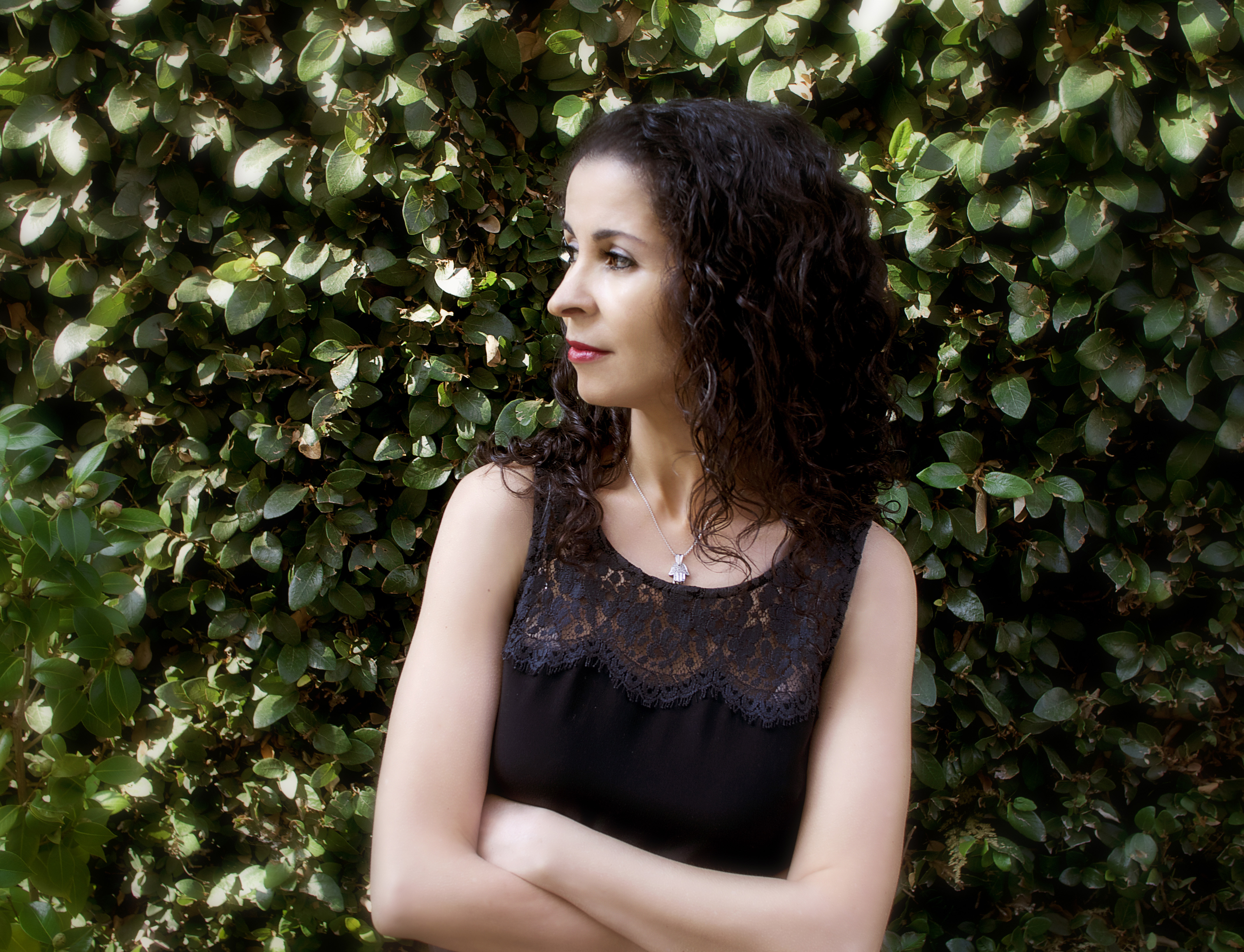
- Born: 1968 (age 57–58); Rabat, Morocco
- Education: Mohammed V University (Lic); University College London (MA); University of Southern California (PhD)
- Occupations: Novelist, professor
- Writing career
- Genre: fiction
- Notable works: The Other Americans (2019), The Moor's Account (2014), Hope and Other Dangerous Pursuits (2005)
- Website: lailalalami.com

Laila Lalami (Arabic: ليلى العلمي, born 1968) is a Moroccan-American novelist, essayist, and professor. After earning her licence ès lettres degree in Morocco, she received a fellowship to study in the United Kingdom (UK), where she earned an MA in linguistics.

In 1992 Lalami moved to the United States, where she completed a PhD in linguistics at the University of Southern California. She began publishing her writing in 1996. Her first novel, composed of linked stories, was published in 2005. In 2015 she was a finalist for the Pulitzer Prize in Fiction for her novel The Moor's Account (2014), about Estevanico, which received strong critical praise and won several other awards.

== Early life and education ==
Lalami was born in a working-class family in Rabat, Morocco. She spoke Moroccan Arabic at home, and learned Standard Arabic and French in elementary school. According to Lalami, all the children's books she read as a child were written in French, and she began to write her own stories in French.

"The characters' names, their homes, their cities, their lives were wholly different from my own," she explained, "and yet, because of my constant exposure to them, they had grown utterly familiar. These images invaded my imaginary world to such an extent that I never thought they came from an alien place."

While her parents both read widely in a variety of genres and encouraged her writing, Lalami has said that they thought she needed to study a profession other than writing.

Lalami earned her licence ès lettres in English from Mohammed V University in Rabat. In 1990, she received a British Council fellowship to study in England, where she completed an MA in Linguistics at University College London. After graduating, she returned to Morocco and worked briefly as a journalist and commentator.

In 1992, she moved to Los Angeles, California, to attend the University of Southern California, from which she graduated with a PhD in Linguistics. She had chosen the field of linguistics in order to be involved with the study of language, even in analysis. Her experiences and studies caused her to reflect on the uses of French and Arabic in Morocco. She was influenced by the work of Palestinian-American intellectual Edward Said. She became aware of the code-switching followed by her and her family, and some upper-class native Moroccans, in their transitions between the two languages. Writing professionally in English, she said, gave her another perspective.

== Career ==
Lalami began writing fiction and nonfiction in English in 1996. Her literary criticism, cultural commentary, and opinion pieces have appeared in The Boston Globe, Boston Review, the Los Angeles Times, The Nation, The New York Times, The Washington Post, The Daily Beast, and elsewhere. In 2016, she was named both a columnist for The Nation magazine and a critic-at-large for the Los Angeles Times Book Review.

Her first book, described as a novel or collection of short stories, Hope and Other Dangerous Pursuits, was published in 2005. It follows four Moroccan migrants who attempt to enter Spain by boat. The book has an unusual narrative structure: the opening story takes place while the main characters are making the crossing; the next four stories flash back to the characters' lives before their fateful journey; and the final four stories flash forward, so that the reader learns the fates of the four. Hope and Other Dangerous Pursuits received wide critical acclaim. In The Washington Post, Carolyn See described it as "a bracing and beautiful little novel". Pankaj Mishra, writing in The New York Review of Books, noted that "Lalami writes about her home country without the expatriate's self-indulgent and often condescending nostalgia."

Lalami's second book, the novel Secret Son (2009), is a coming-of-age story set in the slums of Casablanca. A young college student named Youssef El Mekki discovers that his father—whom he'd been led to believe was a high school teacher, and dead for many years—is a businessman who lives across town. But Youssef's burgeoning relationship with his father, and his sudden change in fortune, are threatened by social and political unrest in the city. The novel explores themes of identity and class in a world increasingly divided by political ideology. Secret Son was longlisted for the Orange Prize.

The Moor's Account, Lalami's third book, was published by Pantheon Books in September 2014. The novel is told from the perspective of Estevanico, a Moroccan slave who is documented as part of the ill-fated Narváez expedition of 1527 and was one of four survivors to reach Mexico City in 1536. He later led expeditions as the first black explorer of America. The Moor's Account won the American Book Award, the Hurston/Wright Legacy Award, and was a finalist for the Pulitzer Prize for Fiction.

In 2019, Lalami published another novel, The Other Americans. The book begins with the suspicious death of a Moroccan immigrant in a hit-and-run accident in a small town in California, and is told from the perspectives of nine different characters who are connected to him. The Other Americans was a finalist for National Book Award for Fiction and the Kirkus Prize.

Lalami's next book, Conditional Citizens: On Belonging in America, is a collection of essays on the theme of American identity and citizenship. It was published by Pantheon Books in September 2020.

Lalami's most recent novel, The Dream Hotel, was published on March 4, 2025, by Pantheon Books in the U.S. and by Bloomsbury in the UK. Set in a chilling near-future surveillance state, the story follows Moroccan-American archivist Sara Hussein, who is detained in a "retention center" after an algorithm flags her dreams as evidence of impending violent intent. As Sara navigates arbitrary restrictions in the former elementary-school prison, Lalami interrogates the erosion of privacy in the age of data mining and predictive justice. Praised as "chillingly original" and "eerily close" to reality, the novel has earned starred reviews and was longlisted for the Women's Prize for Fiction 2025. It was chosen as a Today Show book club pick by Jenna Bush Hager.

Lalami has received an Oregon Literary Arts grant, a Fulbright Fellowship, and a Guggenheim Fellowship. She was selected in 2009 by the World Economic Forum as a Young Global Leader.

She is a distinguished professor of creative writing at the University of California, Riverside and a Harvard Radcliffe Fellow.

== Recognition ==
=== For Hope and Other Dangerous Pursuits ===
- 2006, Fletcher Pratt Fellowship in Fiction, Bread Loaf Writers' Conference
- 2006, Oregon Book Award, Finalist
- 2006, Oregon Literary Arts Fellowship in Fiction
- 2006, Caine Prize for African Writing, Finalist
- 2006, John Gardner Fiction Prize, Finalist

=== For The Moor's Account ===
- 2014, Langum Prizes (Historical Fiction Prize)
- 2015, Pulitzer Prize for Fiction finalist
- 2015, Man Booker Prize longlist
- 2015, American Book Award winner
- 2015, Arab American Book Award winner
- 2015, Hurston/Wright Legacy Award winner

=== For The Other Americans ===
- 2019, Joyce Carol Oates Prize, Winner
- 2019, National Book Award for Fiction, Finalist
- 2019, Kirkus Prize, Finalist
- 2020, Arab American Book Award for Fiction, Winner
- 2020, Aspen Words Literary Prize, Longlist

=== Other honors ===
- 1990, British Council Fellowship
- 2003, Morocco-British Council Literary Prize for the Short Story
- 2007, Fulbright Fellowship
- 2009, Nona Balakian Citation for Excellence in Reviewing, Finalist
- 2009, Young Global Leader, World Economic Forum
- 2010, Orange Prize longlist for Secret Son
- 2012, Lannan Foundation Residency Fellowship
- 2013, Elizabeth George Foundation "Women Authoring Change" Fellowship
- 2016, Guggenheim Fellowship

== Bibliography ==
Novels

- Hope and Other Dangerous Pursuits (Chapel Hill, NC: Algonquin Books, 2005. ISBN 1-56512-493-6)
- Secret Son (Chapel Hill, NC: Algonquin Books, 2009. ISBN 1-56512-494-4)
- The Moor's Account (New York, NY: Pantheon Books, 2014. ISBN 978-0307911667)
- The Other Americans (New York, NY: Pantheon Books, 2019. ISBN 9781524747145)
- The Dream Hotel (New York, NY: Pantheon Books, 2025. ISBN 9780593317600)

Nonfiction

- Conditional Citizens: On Belonging in America (New York, NY: Pantheon Books, 2020. ISBN 9781524747169)

Short stories

- Laila Lalami (2009). "How I Became My Mother's Daughter". Callaloo. 32 (4): 1120–1122. doi:10.1353/cal.0.0572. S2CID 162005943.
- "Echo". The Guardian. September 8, 2011.
- "That Time At My Brother's Wedding." The New York Times Magazine. July 8, 2020.
