= The Dream Hotel =

2025 novel by Laila Lalami

- Author: Laila Lalami
- Publisher: Pantheon Books
- Publication date: March 4, 2025
- Pages: 336
- ISBN: 978-0-593-31760-0

The Dream Hotel is a 2025 literary science fiction novel by Laila Lalami. It received positive reception from critics.

== Plot ==
Sara Hussein is a Moroccan American woman who, upon her return from a trip to the United Kingdom, is detained by a government agency tasked with determining citizens' propensity to committing crimes. She is detained in what starts as a temporary arrangement but, through bureaucratic hiccups and intentional mismanagement, begins to seem more and more permanent.

== Development history ==
=== Publication history ===
The Dream Hotel was published in the United States on March 4, 2025, by Pantheon Books. It was published in the United Kingdom by Bloomsbury Publishing.

== Reception ==
The book received mostly positive reviews from critics. Kirkus Reviews was positive, drawing comparisons to Margaret Atwood's novel The Handmaid's Tale. In a starred review, Publishers Weekly described the book as "chillingly original" and "all too plausible." Francine Prose wrote a positive review for The Washington Post, praising the novel's plot and relevance to modern politics. Vulture was also positive, drawing specific attention to the book's symbolism but mildly criticizing the abruptness of the ending.

Mark O'Connell, writing in The New York Times, praised the book's originality but criticized the writing for being politically unsubtle and the plot for being repetitive. In a review written for The Guardian, Daisy Hildyard described the novel as inducing "a sense of powerlessness and frustration" and praised the book's tension. The Los Angeles Times noted that the novel did not rely on "speculative technology" and was instead a character-driven book, while positive reviews were also published in the Associated Press and NPR.

The Dream Hotel was shortlisted for the Edgar Allan Poe Award for Best Novel in 2026. It was also nominated for the 2026 Arthur C. Clarke Award.
