= The Other Americans =

2019 novel by Laila Lalami

- First edition (US)
- Author: Laila Lalami
- Language: English
- Genre: Novel
- Publisher: Pantheon Books (US); Bloomsbury (UK)
- Publication date: 26 March 2019
- Publication place: United States
- Media type: Print (Hardcover and Paperback)
- Pages: 336 pp (hardback edition)
- ISBN: 978-1524747145 (hardback edition)

The Other Americans is a mystery novel written by Moroccan American novelist Laila Lalami. The novel was published in 2019 by Pantheon Books, an imprint of Penguin Random House.

== Plot ==
The book begins with the suspicious death of Moroccan immigrant, Driss Guerraoui, in a hit-and-run accident in a small town in California, and is told from the perspectives of nine different characters who are connected to him.

== Reception ==
In 2019, The Other Americans was a finalist for National Book Award for Fiction, and the Kirkus Prize. It won the Joyce Carol Oates Prize, and in 2020, it won the Arab American Book Award for Fiction. The novel also made the longlist for the Aspen Words Literary Prize.
