= Emily Pinto =

American painter

- Born: circa 1878
- Known for: painting

Emily Pinto (born c. 1878), also called Emily Pablito, was an American painter from the Zuni Pueblo tribe. Her artwork depicted Zuni culture including Kachina figures and representations of traditional Zuni jars. Some of her drawings and paintings are in the permanent collection of the Smithsonian National Museum of the American Indian.
