= Zuni-Cibola Complex =

- U.S. National Register of Historic Places
- U.S. National Historic Landmark District
- NM State Register of Cultural Properties
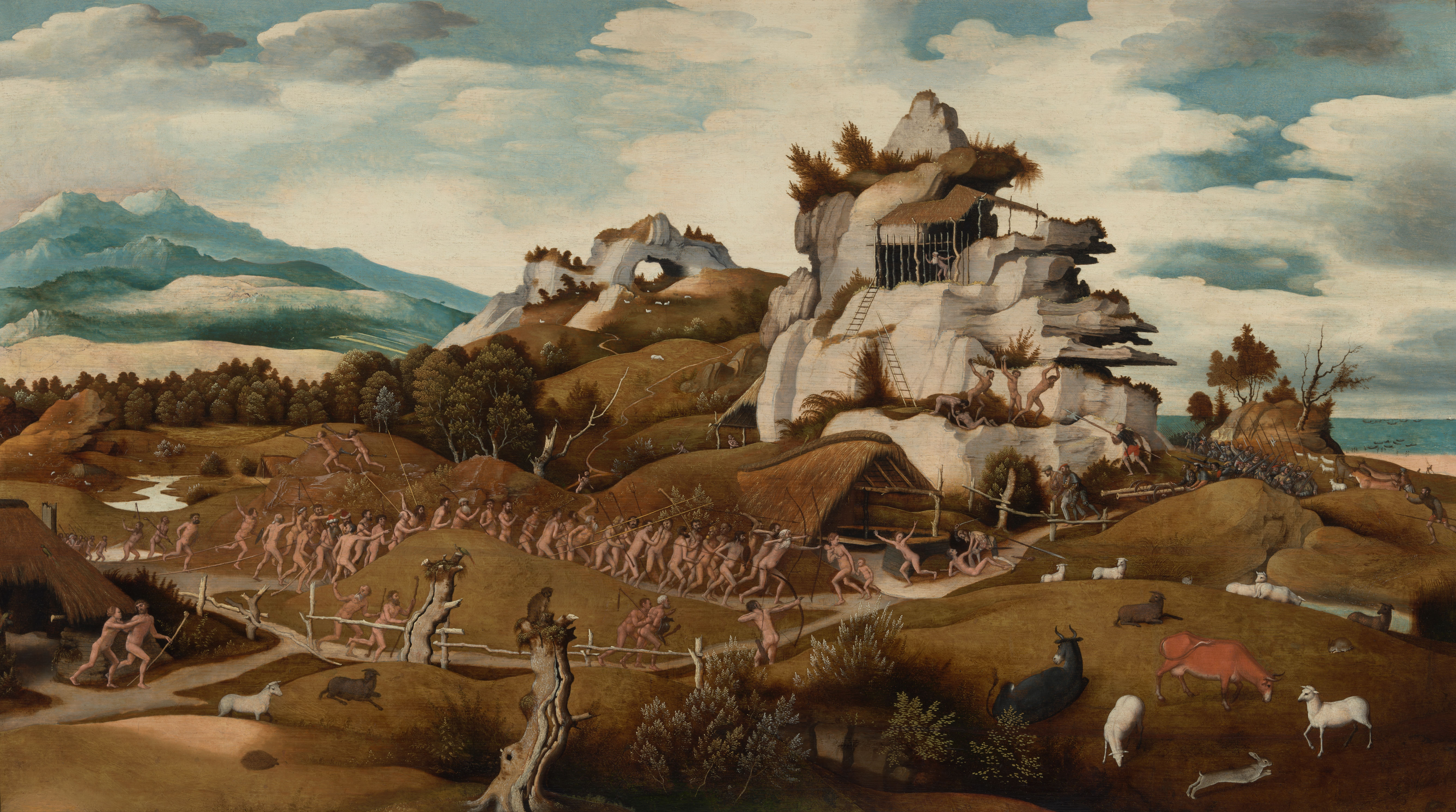
- "Landscape with an episode from the Conquest of America", probably a fanciful artist's conception of Coronado attacking Hawikuh in 1540. Mountain in the left background is probably Mount Taylor.
- Nearest city: Zuni, New Mexico
- Area: 750 acres (300 ha)
- NRHP reference No.: 74002267
- NMSRCP No.: 374

Significant dates
- Added to NRHP: December 2, 1974
- Designated NHLD: December 2, 1974
- Designated NMSRCP: February 28, 1975

The Zuni-Cibola Complex is a collection of prehistoric and historic archaeological sites on the Zuni Pueblo in western New Mexico. It comprises Hawikuh, Yellow House, Kechipbowa, and Great Kivas, all sites of long residence and important in the early Spanish colonial contact period. It was declared a National Historic Landmark District in 1974. These properties were considered as major elements of a national park, but the proposal was ultimately rejected by the Zuni people.

== History ==
The name "Cibola" first entered recorded history in 1539, when Spaniards in southern New Spain (present day Mexico and Central America) heard rumors that there was a province by this name with "Seven Cities of Gold", located across the desert hundreds of leagues to the north. These rumors were largely caused by reports given by the four shipwrecked survivors of the failed Narváez expedition, including Álvar Núñez Cabeza de Vaca and an African slave named Esteban Dorantes, or Estevanico. Upon finally returning to New Spain, the adventurers said they had heard stories from Natives about cities with great and limitless riches.

Upon hearing the castaways' tales, Viceroy Antonio de Mendoza organized an expedition headed by the Franciscan friar Marcos de Niza, who took Estevanico as his guide. During the voyage, in a place called Vacapa (probably located somewhere around the state of Sonora), de Niza sent Estevanico to scout ahead. A short while later, Estevanico met a monk who had heard stories from the Natives about seven cities called "Cibola", said to be overflowing with riches. Estevanico did not wait for the friar, but instead continued travelling until he reached Cibola (Háwikuh, now in New Mexico), where, at the hands of the Zuni tribe, he met his death, and his companions were forced to flee.

Marcos de Niza returned to Mexico City and said that the expedition had continued even after the death of Estevanico. He claimed that they had seen Cíbola from a great distance, and that it was larger than Tenochtitlan; in this city, the people used dishes of gold and silver, decorated their houses with turquoise, and had gigantic pearls, emeralds, and other beautiful gems. It is now believed by some historians that the mica-inflected clay of the adobe pueblos may have created an optical illusion when inflamed by the setting sun, thus fuelling the tale.

Upon hearing this news, the Viceroy de Mendoza wasted no time in organizing a large military expedition to take possession of the riches that the monk had described with such vivid detail. Upon the Viceroy's command, Francisco Vázquez de Coronado began his expedition, taking the friar Marcos de Niza as his guide. Coronado left with a small group of explorers from Culiacán on April 22, 1540.

When Coronado arrived at Hawikuh pueblo, which the chroniclers called Cevola, Tzibola, or Cibola, he discovered that Marcos de Niza's stories were lies, and that there were in fact no treasures as the friar had described. He also found that, contrary to the friar's account, the sea was not within view from that region, but it was instead many days' journey away. Nevertheless, Coronado occupied the region by military force and used it as a base for future explorations.

== Sites ==
The Zuni Pueblo has a large number of archaeological sites, and was considered in the early 1970s as a site for a major national cultural park, based on a subset of those sites that are larger and suitable for public access. The stated intent was to preserve and stabilize the archaeological properties, and to properly interpret them for visitors to the region. Congress authorized enabling legislation in 1988, but the proposal foundered when the people of Zuni Pueblo overwhelmingly voted against leasing land to the National Park Service for the project. The park proposal included four major elements, described below, all of which are located on Zuni reservation lands.

== Yellow House ==
Yellow House, known in Zuni as "Heshotathluptsina", is located east of Zuni near the mouth of Horsehead Canyon. In the early 1970s, it was largely unimproved and unexcavated, surveys indicated it was probably a late prehistoric habitation (c. 14th century CE), although there was also evidence of possible earlier use. The site's location was considered suitable as a contact site for the proposed national park, due to its proximity to New Mexico State Road 53.

== Hawikuh ==
Hawikuh was one of the largest settlements in the Zuni territory at the time of Coronado's 1540 expedition. Located about 12 miles (19 km) southwest of Zuni, it includes the excavated ruins of that settlement, as well as the remains of the 17th-century Spanish mission La Purísima Concepcíón de Hawikuh. Spanish control over Hawikuh in the 17th century was always tenuous, and it was abandoned after the 1680 Pueblo Rebellion.

== Kechipbowa ==
Kechipbowa is located about 3 miles (4.8 km) east of Hawikuh. It is a multifaceted site, including structures associated with occupation during the 15th and 16th centuries, but also with remains that are likely older, and the remains of another 17th-century Spanish mission church.

== Great Kivas ==
The Village of the Great Kivas is located 17 miles (27 km) northeast of Zuni, and is considered a transitional site associated with both the Chaco culture, which flourished north of the Zuni territory 1100–1350 CE, and the Mogollon culture to the south. The site includes three major room complexes and two very large kivas.

== See also ==
- National Register of Historic Places listings in Cibola County, New Mexico
- National Register of Historic Places listings in McKinley County, New Mexico
- List of National Historic Landmarks in New Mexico

== Sources ==
- Crampton, C. Gregory. The Zunis of Cibola. Salt Lake City: University of Utah Press, 1977.
