= Hope and Other Dangerous Pursuits =

2005 book by Laila Lalami

- Author: Laila Lalami
- Language: English
- Genre: Novel
- Publisher: Algonquin Books
- Publication date: 7 October 2005
- Publication place: Morocco
- Media type: Print (hardback & paperback)
- ISBN: 1-56512-493-6 (hardback edition)
- OCLC: 59881995
- Dewey Decimal: 813/.6 22
- LC Class: PS3612.A543 H68 2005

Hope and Other Dangerous Pursuits (2005) is the debut book by Moroccan-American author Laila Lalami. It has been described as a novel, and as a linked series of short stories or fictional portraits. First published in the United States, the connected stories explore the extensive immigration from North Africa to Europe through the lives of four Moroccan characters: two men and two women.

== Plot summary ==
A group of young Moroccan immigrants seeking a better life in Spain cross the Strait of Gibraltar on a lifeboat. When it capsizes near shore, it is everyone for themselves. The book chronicles the lives of four of the passengers: two men and two women, Murad, Aziz, Halima, with her three small children; and Faten, exploring their lives before the trip and why they chose the dangerous path of immigration.

Lalami has said she was inspired by an article in Le Monde about some Moroccan immigrants.

== Reception ==
In the Washington Post, Carolyn See described it as "a bracing and beautiful little novel." Pankaj Mishra, writing in the New York Review of Books, said that "Lalami writes about her home country without the expatriate's self-indulgent and often condescending nostalgia."

Kirkus Reviews said the book was "ambitious", ...[f]lawed but impressive: This could well be the preamble to an important body of work."

Publishers Weekly described it as "Less a novel than a set of finely detailed portraits, this book gives outsiders a glimpse of some of Moroccan society's strata and the desperation that underlies many ordinary lives."

In a 2014 essay, critic Lisa Marchi said the book is "wisely constructed: the writer confidently travels between temporal settings and geographical zones to gradually unveil the genealogy of each character’s migratory project".

== Themes ==
Lisa Marchi says that the collection of stories "highlights the economic precarity, social invisibility, and indisputable vulnerability of the migrants".

The stories present a complex view of the nature of the "Muslim" identity of many of these immigrants.
