= Secret Son =

2009 novel by Laila Lalami

- First edition (publ. Algonquin Books)
- Author: Laila Lalami
- Language: English
- Genre: Bildungsroman
- Publisher: Algonquin Books
- Publication date: 2009
- Pages: 291 (first edition)
- ISBN: 9781565124943

Secret Son is the 2009 novel by Moroccan-American writer Laila Lalami. The novel is a bildungsroman that follows its main character, a Muslim youth named Youssef El Mekki, as he comes of age in the Casablanca slums.

== Development ==
Like other Arab-American novels, it focuses on themes related to class, gender, religion, migration/immigration and cultural conflict, with a particular emphasis on the cultural conflict that leads to radicalization of terrorists. Critic Steven Salaita compared the novel to Anouar Majid's Si Yussef. Lalami chose to write the novel in her third language: English, choosing not to use her first two languages: French and Arabic.

== Reception ==
The New York Times gave the novel a moderately good review saying that "Secret Son is a nuanced depiction of the roots of Islamic terrorism, written by someone who intimately knows one of the stratified societies where it grows" but "Her English prose, although clean and closely observed, lacks music, and her similes can be predictable".
