= Hawikuh Ruins =

- Hawikuh
- U.S. National Register of Historic Places
- U.S. National Historic Landmark
- U.S. National Historic Landmark District – Contributing property
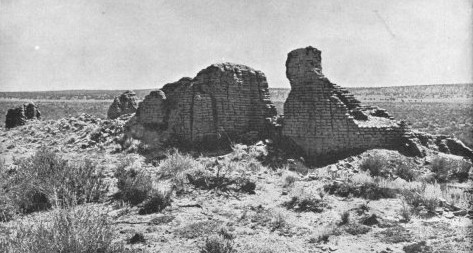
- Ruins of Mission La Purísima Concepción de Hawikuh, photo circa 1886

- Location within New Mexico Location within the United States
- Nearest city: Zuni, New Mexico
- Coordinates: 34°55′56″N 108°59′4.4″W
- Area: 10 acres (4.0 ha)
- Built: 1539
- Part of: Zuni-Cibola Complex (ID74002267)
- NRHP reference No.: 66000502

Significant dates
- Added to NRHP: October 15, 1966
- Designated NHL: October 9, 1960
- Designated NHLDCP: December 2, 1974

Hawikuh (Zuni: Hawikku, meaning "gum leaves"), was one of the largest of the Zuni pueblos at the time of the Spanish entrada. It was founded around 1400 AD. It was the first pueblo to be visited and conquered by Spanish explorers. The Spanish chroniclers referred to it as Cevola, Tzibola, or Cibola.

The pueblo site is located 12 miles (19 km) southwest of Zuni Pueblo, on the Zuni Indian Reservation in Cibola County, New Mexico. In 1960 the site was designated as a National Historic Landmark known as the Hawikuh Ruins. It is included as a contributing part of the Zuni-Cibola Complex of archaeological sites, a larger National Historic Landmark District designated by the United States Department of Interior in 1974.

== History ==
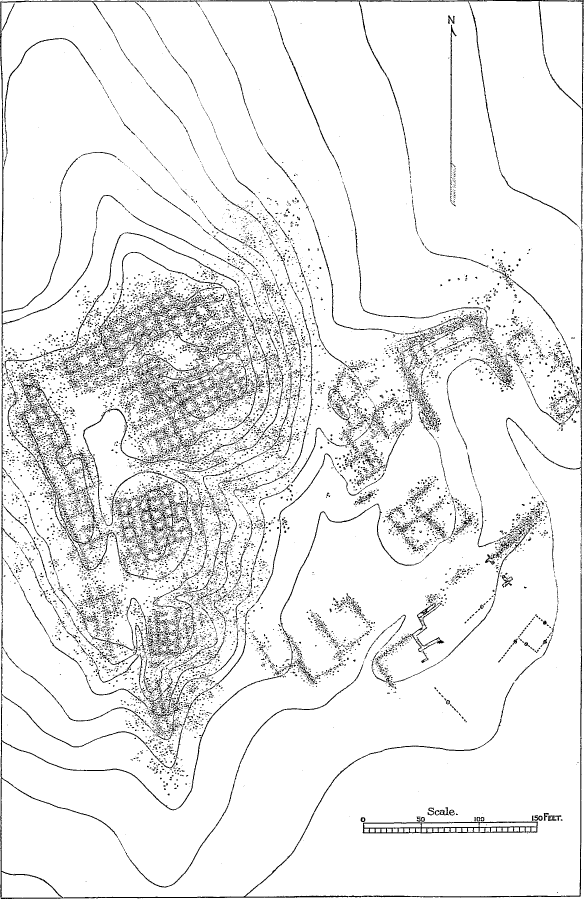
Map of Hawikuh Ruins by Victor Mindeleff, 1891

In 1539, the Spanish sent Marcos de Niza along with Estevanico and Sonoran Natives to investigate rumors of the seven cities of gold. Estevanico became the first non-native to visit and die in Hawikuh. Rumors and legends revolving around the disappearance of Estevanico in the region eventually led to the Tiguex War. The war occurred during a later expedition by Francisco Vásquez de Coronado, as he searched for the legendary "Seven Cities of Gold".

He wrote about the pueblo:

Although they are not decorated with turquoises, nor made of lime or good bricks, nevertheless they are very good houses, with three, four, and five stories, where there are very good apartments ... and some very good rooms underground Kivas, paved, which are made for winter and have something like hot baths.

Some Hawikuu residents fled to the Dowa Yalanne mesa top to escape the attackers of the Coronado expedition. The 14 structures at Dowa Yalanne, which were used as a refuge from the Spaniards between 1540 and 1680, were called Heshoda Ayahltona ("ancient buildings above").

In 1628 the Spanish established Mission La Purísima Concepción de Hawikuh at this pueblo. The Spanish attempted to suppress the Zuni religion, and introduced the encomienda forced-labor system. In 1632, the Hawikuh Zuni rebelled, burned the church, and killed the priest. In 1672, Apache raiders burned the church. In 1680 it was burned again during the Great Pueblo Revolt, when all the Nuevo México pueblos rose against the Spanish. After this revolt, the Zuni permanently abandoned Hawikuh.

== Archaeological excavations ==
Hawikuh is located within the boundaries of the Zuni Indian Reservation near Zuni, New Mexico. The ruins of Hawikuh were excavated during 1917-23 by the Heye Foundation under the leadership of Frederick Webb Hodge, who was assistant director of the Museum of the American Indian, New York. The records and artifacts from this excavation are held by the National Museum of the American Indian, Washington, D.C. It acquired Heye's museum collection in 1989.

Hawikuh was declared a National Historic Landmark in 1961 by the Department of Interior.

American archaeologists Watson Smith, Richard B. Woodbury, and Nathalie F. S. Woodbury published a report of the Hendricks-Hodge Expedition in 1966 through the Smithsonian National Museum of the American Indian and the Heye Foundation.

== See also ==
- List of battles fought in New Mexico
- List of National Historic Landmarks in New Mexico
- National Register of Historic Places listings in Cibola County, New Mexico
- Richard B. Woodbury
- Prehistoric archaeology
