= Alonso del Castillo Maldonado =

Spanish explorer (died after 1547)

- Born: Unknown; Salamanca, Spain
- Died: after 1547; New Spain
- Occupations: Explorer and treasurer (1547)

Alonso del Castillo Maldonado (died after 1547) was an early Spanish explorer in the Americas. He was one of the last four survivors of the original members of the 1527 Narváez expedition, along with Álvar Núñez Cabeza de Vaca, Andrés Dorantes de Carranza and his African slave Estevanico. They were the early non-native people to travel and be enslaved in the Southwest region of the modern United States. Castillo Maldonado lived with a Native American tribe in Texas in 1527 and 1528.

== Biography ==
=== Travel in New Spain ===
Alonso del Castillo Maldonado was born in Salamanca, Spain, to Aldonza Maldonado. He was a close cousin of the Alcalde Mayor of Santo Domingo, Alonso Maldonado, and of Martín de Guzmán. Raised in a poor family of minor Spanish nobility Hidalgos, Castillo travelled to the Americas to get rich. He took part in Pánfilo de Narváez's 1527 expedition, which traveled to Florida.

On 17 June 1527, a fleet of five ships with 600 men led by Narváez set sail from the coast of Sanlucar de Barrameda. After several weeks, they arrived at the island of La Española where they were provisioned and stayed for a time. When leaving the island and entering the waters of the Gulf of Mexico, one ship of the expedition was put under the joint command of Alonso del Castillo Maldonado and Andrés Dorantes de Carranza.

In early November, the raft captained by Andrés Dorantes de Carranza and manned by Castillo, the slave Estevanico, and about 40 other men, was wrecked by storms on or near Galveston Island, on the coast of what is now Texas. Shortly after, a second raft captained by Cabeza de Vaca was wrecked on the same island. In total, about 90 men were shipwrecked on the island without any food or equipment. Two indigenous tribes gave them shelter and food but the winter was so severe that only fifteen of the castaways survived until spring.

In the spring of 1528, thirteen of the fifteen survivors decided to leave the island, abandoning Cabeza de Vaca (because he was sick and unable to travel) and two other members of the expedition. In April 1529, this group, led by Dorantes and Castillo, reached the coast and landed at Matagorda Bay. However, most of the members of this expedition were killed by Native Americans. Only three survived: Dorantes de Carranza, Castillo and Estevanico.

For almost seven years they lived enslaved by a Native Americans tribe, until the three men managed to reunite with Cabeza de Vaca in September 1534, somewhere west of the Sabine River. Cabeza de Vaca taught his companions the Native American art of medicine. In August 1535, the men fled from the Avavare tribe, with whom they were living as medicine men. They fled inland, crossing what is now Texas (being, apparently, the first Europeans to do so) until they arrived in El Paso in late 1535. (Note: Although for a long time it was believed that they also had come to New Mexico, it is now known that this was not the case.) Finally, they headed south, and in late 1535 they explored the territory of the modern-day Mexican state of Chihuahua, crossing through the territory of the Mexican state of Sonora. They temporarily settled in the land of the Pimas and the Sierra Madre, where they lived with a Native tribe for three days. After hearing the natives speak of a Spanish village located further south, they travelled to the modern-day Mexican state of Sinaloa in 1536. They were accompanied by hundreds of Native Americans, and despite encountering a party of slave hunters led by Diego de Alcaraz, managed to ensure their safe passage. Later, Castillo and his companions reunited with other Spanish groups residing in north Culiacán – included among them the future explorer Melchor Díaz, who received them. From there, they traveled to Compostela, Nueva Galicia's capital.

=== Last years ===
When the governor of New Galicia, Nuño de Guzman, received news that Spanish castaways had reached land under his jurisdiction, he provided them with horses and clothing and sent them to Mexico City to provide accounts to the viceroy of New Spain, Antonio de Mendoza. Their story was already known in the city, and they were received with great honors.

Alonso del Castillo married in Mexico and was the beneficiary of the encomienda of his wife in Tehuacán, Puebla.

In 1541, he traveled to Spain to claim his inheritance because his father had died while he traveled across North America and some relatives had already inherited. He stayed briefly in Spain before returning to the Americas, living the rest of his life in New Spain. In 1545, Castillo served as treasurer at Guatemala. In 1547, Alonso del Castillo was listed as a witness in a trial. It is believed that he died in the late 1540s.
