= Andrés Dorantes de Carranza =

Spanish explorer

- Born: ca. 1500; Béjar del Castañar, Salamanca (or in Gibraleón, Huelva), Spain
- Died: 1550s New Spain?
- Occupation: Explorer

Andrés Dorantes de Carranza (ca. 1500 – 1550s), was an early Spanish explorer in the Americas. He was one of the four last survivors of the Narváez expedition, along with Álvar Núñez Cabeza de Vaca, Alonso del Castillo Maldonado, and Estevanico, Dorantes' slave of African descent.

== Biography ==
Dorantes was born in Béjar del Castañar, Salamanca (or possibly in Gibraleón), Spain, ca. 1500. His father was Pablo Dorantes and he was raised in a poor hidalgo family of minor Spanish nobility. His family was of an ancient lineage and had mayorazgos of quality. Carranza traveled to the Americas to enrich himself under Captain Pánfilo de Narváez. When the expedition was organized, one boat was placed under the joint command of Dorantes and Alonso del Castillo Maldonado.

Thus, Dorantes and Estevanico traveled to Florida in 1527. In April 1528, the expeditionary group escaped a hurricane near Cuba and arrived to Florida, landing in a zone located near Tampa Bay. They claimed the newly discovered area for the Castilian Crown. However, the group was affected by several more hurricanes and by attacks of the Native Americans, which caused the death of many expedition members. In addition, after leaving Florida, with fewer men on board (for the reasons before mentioned), three of the five vessels of the expedition sank during the travel to the modern-day Mexico, with about 80 men surviving. The vessels reached the coast of Galveston Island, Texas. In this place, however, their troubles continued: the harsh winter and lack of food caused the death of most of the expedition's members. The group resumed its march with only 15 men, including Dorantes, Castillo, Estevanico, and Cabeza de Vaca. In the spring, the group crossed the Colorado River's coast and by the modern New Mexico, Texas and Mexico.

In March 1536, after wandering throughout Texas (much of the time spent enslaved by various Native American tribes) the survivors crossed the modern Mexican states of Chihuahua and Sinaloa, reaching the city of Culiacán, where they connected with other Spanish people.

When New Galicia's governor Nuño de Guzmán heard news about the Spanish castaways who had reached land under their jurisdiction, he gave them several goods (horses and clothing) and sent them to the capital of New Spain, Mexico City, to surrender accounts to the Viceroy of New Spain, Antonio de Mendoza.

Mendoza offered Dorantes a position leading a new expedition, but Dorantes refused and instead made plans to return to Spain. Dorantes sold Estevanico to the Viceroy. However, when he was preparing to leave, his ship was pronounced unfit to sail, so he came back to Veracruz. After this, Dorantes never left New Spain again. He died in the 1550s.

== Personal life ==
Dorantes first married María de la Torre. After she died, Carranza married Paula Dorantes. Both of his wives were widows. He had more than fourteen children. One of his children was Baltazar Dorantes de Carranza, born in Mexico in the mid-sixteenth century, who served as treasurer of Veracruz and procurator of New Spain in Castile.
