= Esteban de Dorantes =

African explorer (c.1500–1539)

- Born: c. 1500; Azemmour, Morocco (Wattasid period)
- Disappeared: 1539; Hawikuh, Nuevo México, New Spain
- Other names: Esteban the Moor, Little Stephen, Estevanico
- Occupations: Explorer in present-day Mexico and parts of the southwest United States

Esteban de Dorantes (c. 1500–1539), also known as Estevanico the Moor, is believed to have been the first person of African and Arab descent to explore what is considered the present-day United States region of North America and one of the last four survivors of the Narváez expedition. He is preceded by Juan Garrido, who is the first person of African descent to explore North America.

Little is known about Esteban's background, but contemporary accounts described him as a "negro alárabe" or "Arabic-speaking black man" native to Azemmour, Morocco. In 1522, he was sold as a slave to the Spanish nobleman Andrés Dorantes de Carranza in the Portuguese-controlled Moroccan town of Azemmour.

Starting in 1528, he participated in the Narváez expedition, which set out from Cuba under the leadership of Pánfilo de Narváez to explore and colonize Spanish Florida. After numerous challenges, including shipwrecks and enslavement by Native Americans, Esteban, along with three other survivors, escaped their captivity in 1534 and became medicine men. They embarked on an epic journey, covering nearly 2,000 miles (3,200 kilometres), through the American interior, becoming the first Europeans and African to enter the American West. Their travels were greeted with respect and admiration from the indigenous communities, and they finally reached a Spanish settlement in Sinaloa, Mexico, in July 1536.

Their tales of rich civilizations in the north captivated Spaniards in Mexico City, leading the Viceroy of New Spain, Antonio de Mendoza, to commission Fray Marcos de Niza to search for the fabled Seven Cities of Cibola. Esteban served as a guide for the expedition, venturing ahead of the main party with a group of Sonoran Indians and trade goods. After telling the Pueblo peoples they would soon become part of the Spanish Empire, he was attacked and killed at Cíbola. Several contemporary accounts describe his demise. His journey, as chronicled by Álvar Núñez Cabeza de Vaca, provided insights into the peoples, wildlife, and geography of western North America.

== Background ==
Very little a known about the background of Esteban. The most comprehensive description of his origins consists of just one line written by Álvar Núñez Cabeza de Vaca in his Spanish account of the Narváez expedition. Cabeza de Vaca wrote that he was a "negro alárabe, natural de Azamor", which can be translated as "an Arabized black, native to Azemmour" or "an Arabic-speaking black man, a native of Azamor". This same chronicle does not mention his enslavement but other contemporary documents make it clear that he was owned by Andrés Dorantes de Carranza, a Spanish nobleman who participated in the expedition. Anthropologist Hsain Ilahiane argues that he was most likely an Arab Muslim in his youth.

Most contemporary accounts referred to him by his personal nicknames Esteban, sometimes spelled Estevan, or simply el negro (a common Spanish term, meaning "the black"). According to Patrick Charles Pautz and Rolena Adorno, "the use of the diminutive form (Estevanico) was common practice for subalterns such as slaves and interpreters, African or Indian, in the service of Castilians".

As a young man, Esteban was sold into slavery in 1522 in the Portuguese-controlled Moroccan town of Azemmour, on the Atlantic coast. He was sold to Andrés Dorantes de Carranza. Although raised Muslim, he was baptized as a Catholic in Spain to join his master because Spain did not allow non-Catholics to travel to New Spain.

== Narváez expedition ==
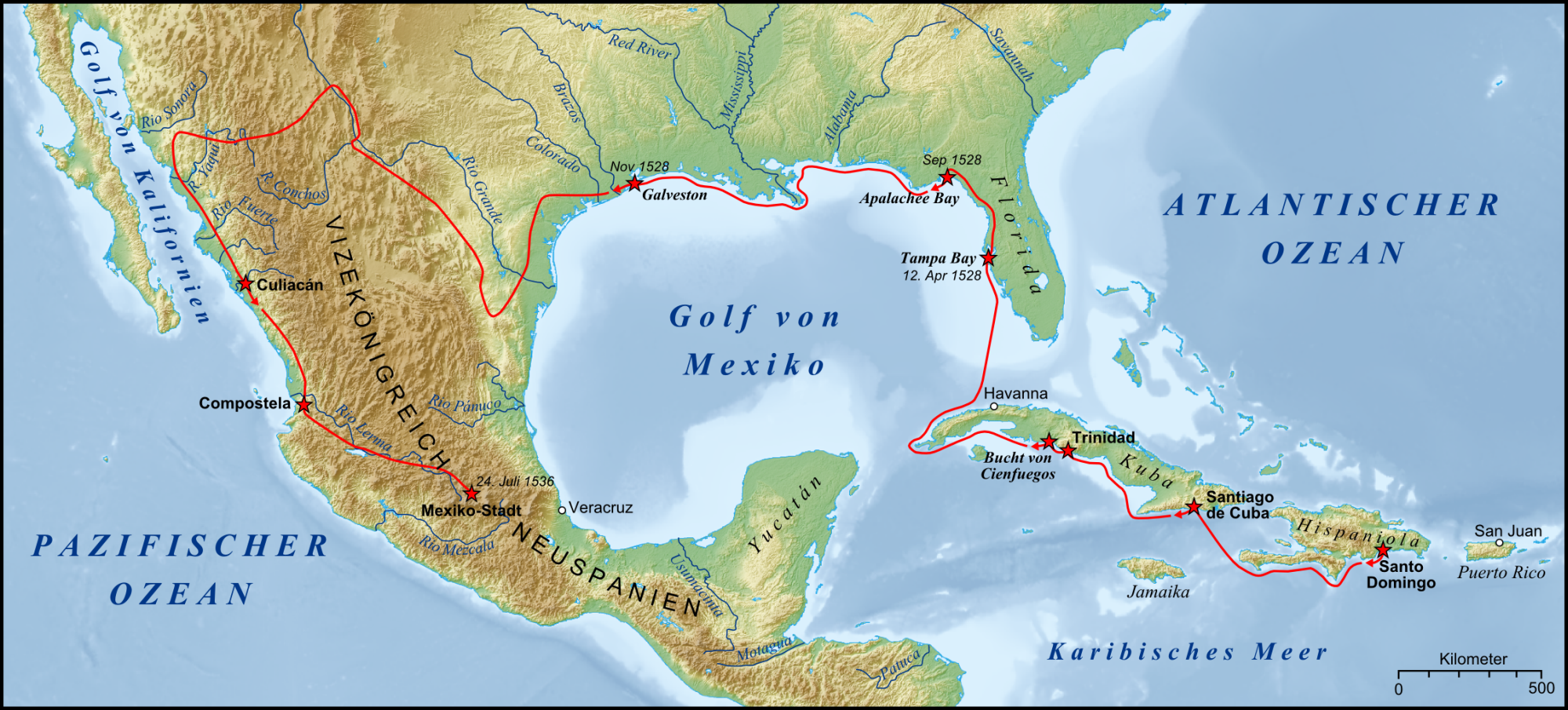
Reconstructed route of the Narváez-Cabeza de Vaca expedition.

The expedition of some 300 men, led by the newly appointed adelantado (governor) of La Florida, Pánfilo de Narváez, left Cuba in February 1528 intending to go to Isla de las Palmas near present-day Tampico, Mexico, to establish two settlements. Storms and strong winds forced the fleet to the western coast of Florida. The Narváez expedition landed in present-day St. Petersburg, Florida, on the shores of Boca Ciega Bay. Narváez ordered his ships and 100 men and 10 women to sail north in search of a large harbor that his pilots assured them was nearby. He led another 300 men, with 42 horses, north along the coast, intending to rejoin his ships at the large harbor. There is no large harbor north of Boca Ciega Bay, and Narváez never saw his ships again.

After marching 300 miles north, and having armed confrontations with Native Americans, the survivors built boats to sail westward along the Gulf Coast shoreline hoping to reach Pánuco and the Rio de las Palmas. A storm struck when they were near Galveston Island, Texas. Approximately 80 men survived the storm, being washed ashore at Galveston Island. After 1529, three survivors from one boat, including Esteban, became enslaved by Coahuiltecan Indians; in 1532, they were reunited with a survivor from a different boat, Álvar Núñez Cabeza de Vaca. The four spent years enslaved on the Texas barrier islands.

In 1534 the four survivors escaped into the American interior and became medicine men. The four men, Cabeza de Vaca, Andrés Dorantes de Carranza, Alonso del Castillo Maldonado and Estevan, escaped captivity in 1534 and traveled west into present-day Texas, the larger Southwest, and Northern Mexico. They were the first Europeans and African to enter the American West. Having walked nearly 2,000 miles since their initial landing in Florida, they finally reached a Spanish settlement in Sinaloa. They traveled from there to Mexico City, 1,000 miles to the south. As medicine men they were treated with great respect and offered food, shelter, and gifts, and villages held celebrations in their honor. When they decided they wanted to leave, the host village would guide them to the next village. Sometimes as many as 3,000 people would follow them to the next village. Esteban and his companions were the first non-Native to visit Pueblo lands. The party traversed the continent as far as western Mexico, into the Sonoran Desert to the region of Sonora in New Spain (present-day Mexico). After finding a small Spanish settlement, the four survivors travelled 1,000 miles to the south to Mexico City, arriving in July 1536.

Cabeza de Vaca published the Relación, a book about their 8-year survival journey, in 1542 and included information about Esteban. It was reprinted again in 1555. It was the first published book to describe the peoples, wildlife, flora and fauna of inland North America, and the first to describe the American bison. In the Relación, Cabeza de Vaca said Esteban often went in advance of the other three survivors because he had learned some parts of the indigenous language.

== Expedition to New Mexico ==
In Mexico City, the four survivors of the expedition told stories of wealthy indigenous tribes to the north, which created a stir among Spaniards in Mexico. When the three Spaniards declined to lead an expedition to the north, Antonio de Mendoza, the Viceroy of New Spain, commissioned Fray Marcos de Niza to lead an expedition north in search of the fabled Seven Cities of Cibola. Esteban was instructed to serve as a guide for the expedition. In a letter to Charles V, Mendoza wrote "I retained a negro who had come with Dorantes". According to a contemporary source, Mendoza either purchased him or received him as a gift from Dorantes. There is some evidence that Mendoza emancipated Esteban; he was added to the viceroy's personal guard and never again referred to as a slave.

On 7 March 1539, the expedition left from Culiacán, the northernmost Spanish settlement in Nueva Galicia. Esteban traveled ahead of the main party with a group of Sonoran Indians and a quantity of trade goods. As before, he assumed the role of a medicine man, wearing bells and feathers on his arms and ankles and carrying a gourd rattle decorated with strings of bells and two feathers. He was instructed by Fray Marcos to communicate by sending back crosses to the main party, with the size of the cross indicating the importance of his discoveries. One day, a cross arrived that was as tall as a person and the messengers said that Esteban had heard reports of seven large and wealthy cities in a land to the north called Cíbola. The advance party proceeded to the north in search of Cíbola despite instructions from Fray Marcos to wait for him.

== Death accounts ==
When Esteban was within a day's journey of Cíbola, he sent a messenger ahead to announce his arrival. When informed of Esteban's impending visit, the chief of the first village angrily ordered the messenger to leave and threatened to kill anyone who came back. Esteban seemed unconcerned by these threats and proceeded to Cíbola. When the party arrived, the villagers took their trade goods and held them overnight without food or water. One of the Indians who had been with Esteban's party managed to escape and hide nearby. The next morning he saw the men of Cíbola chasing him and shooting arrows at him. He did not see what happened to the African, but others in his party were killed. The hidden Indian hurried to tell Fray Marcos what he had witnessed.

Upon hearing the news of the attack, Fray Marcos hurried forward. Soon he met two more Sonorans from the advance party who were wounded and bloodstained. They did not know for certain the fate of Esteban but they assumed he was dead. After hearing this, De Niza quickly returned to New Spain and wrote an account of his expedition for the viceroy. In his Relacíon, he reported on the death of Esteban at Hawikuh as related to him by members of the African's party.

A year later, a much larger Spanish expedition led by Francisco Vázquez de Coronado reached the Pueblo where Esteban was reported killed. In August 1540, he wrote to the viceroy that "the death of the negro is perfectly certain because many of the things which he wore have been found." He also wrote that the inhabitants of the Zuni pueblo where he died had killed Esteban because he was a "bad man" who killed and assaulted their women.

Other contemporary accounts of Esteban's death are known. Pedro de Castañeda de Nájera, a chronicler of the Coronado expedition, wrote that the men of Cibola killed him because they were offended when he asked them for turquoise and women. Hernando Alarcon, also a member of the expedition, was told that when Esteban bragged that he had numerous armed followers nearby, the chiefs of Cibola killed him before he could reveal their location to his followers. Sancho Dorantes de Carranza, the grandson of Andrés Dorantes de Carranza, wrote that Esteban was "shot through with arrows like a Saint Sebastian."

Modern historians have advanced other theories to explain Esteban's death. Roberts and Roberts have suggested that Estevanico, who wore owl feathers and carried a medicine-man's gourd, may have been seen by the Zuni as impersonating a medicine man, which they punished by death. Others theorize that he may have resembled an evil sorcerer who existed in the Zuni religion, the "Chakwaina" kachina."

Juan Francisco Maura suggested in 2002 that the Zuni did not kill Esteban, but rather he and his friends remained among the A:shiwi who probably helped him fake his death so he could regain his freedom. Some folklore legends say that the Kachina figure, Chakwaina, is based on Estevanico.

== Representation in other media ==
- The Moor's Account, a 2014 novel by American writer Laila Lalami, is a fictional memoir of Esteban.
- Esteban de Dorantes appears as the protagonist of the short story eyewear by harry turtledove where he had mask of the sun and visit his other version who is a time traveller and warned him of the aztec defeating the conquistadors in another timeline

== See also ==
- List of slaves
- York (explorer)
