= Zuni people =

Native American Pueblo peoples native to the Zuni River valley

Zuni
A:shiwi
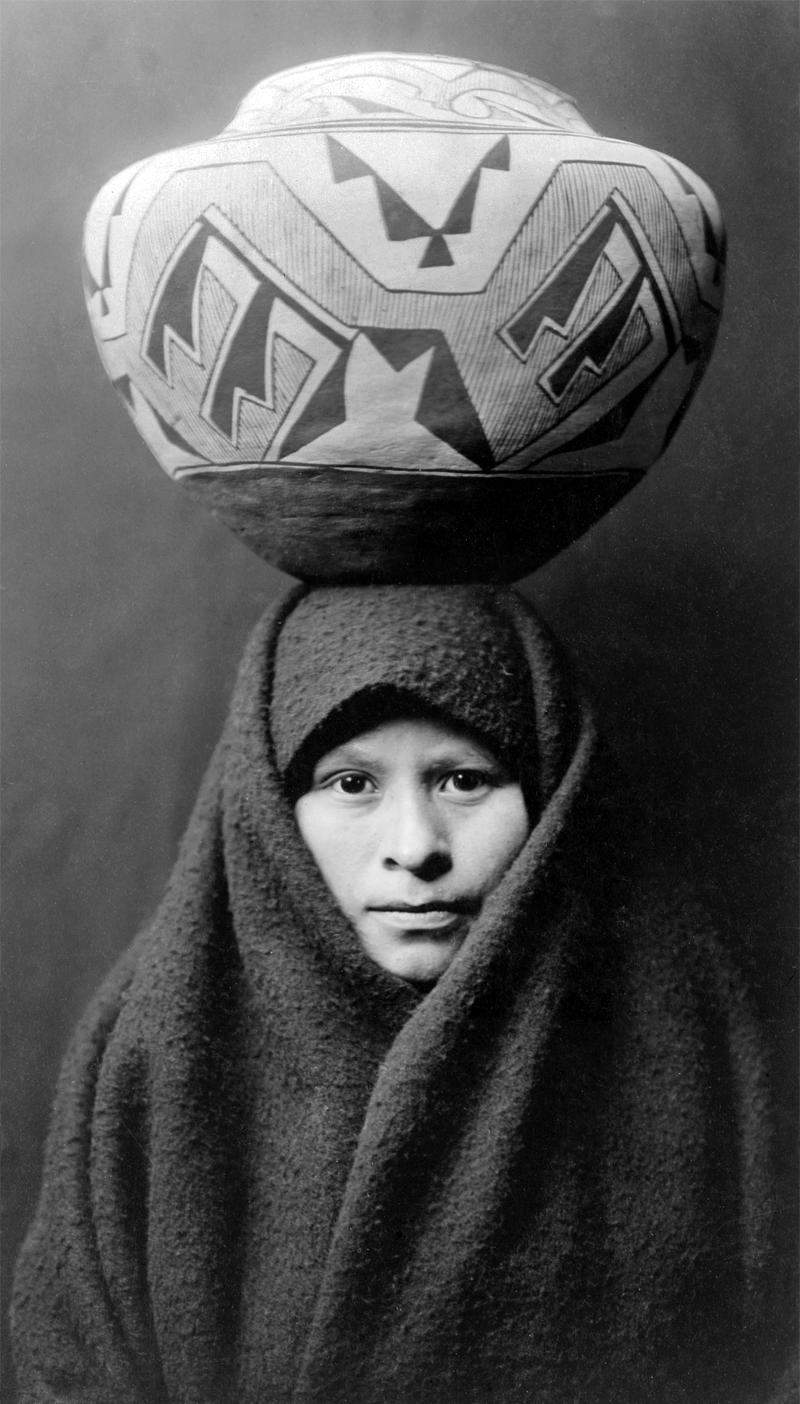
- Zuni girl with jar, 1903

Total population
- 10,000

Regions with significant populations
- United States (New Mexico)

Languages
- Zuni, English, Spanish

Religion
- Zuni mythology, Christianity

Related ethnic groups
- Pueblo people

Map of historical distribution of Zuni (light green) and current Zuni land (dark green)

The Zuni (Note: Formerly spelled Zuñi) (Zuni: A:shiwi; IPA: [ʔaːʃiwi]) are a Native American Pueblo people indigenous to the Zuni River valley. The Zuni people today are federally recognized as the Zuni Tribe of the Zuni Reservation, New Mexico, and most live in the Pueblo of Zuni on the Zuni River, a tributary of the Little Colorado River, in western New Mexico, United States.

The Zuni call their homeland Halona Idiwan’a or Middle Place. The Pueblo of Zuni is 55 km (34 mi) south of Gallup, New Mexico. In addition to the reservation, the tribe owns trust lands in Catron County, New Mexico, and Apache County, Arizona. The word Zuni is believed to derive from the Western Keres language (Acoma) word sɨ̂‧ni, or a cognate thereof.

== History ==
Archaeology suggests that the Zuni have been farmers in the general area for 3,000 to 4,000 years. It is now thought that the Ancestral Zuni people inhabited the Zuni River valley from the last millennium B.C., when they began using irrigation to farm maize on at least household-sized plots.

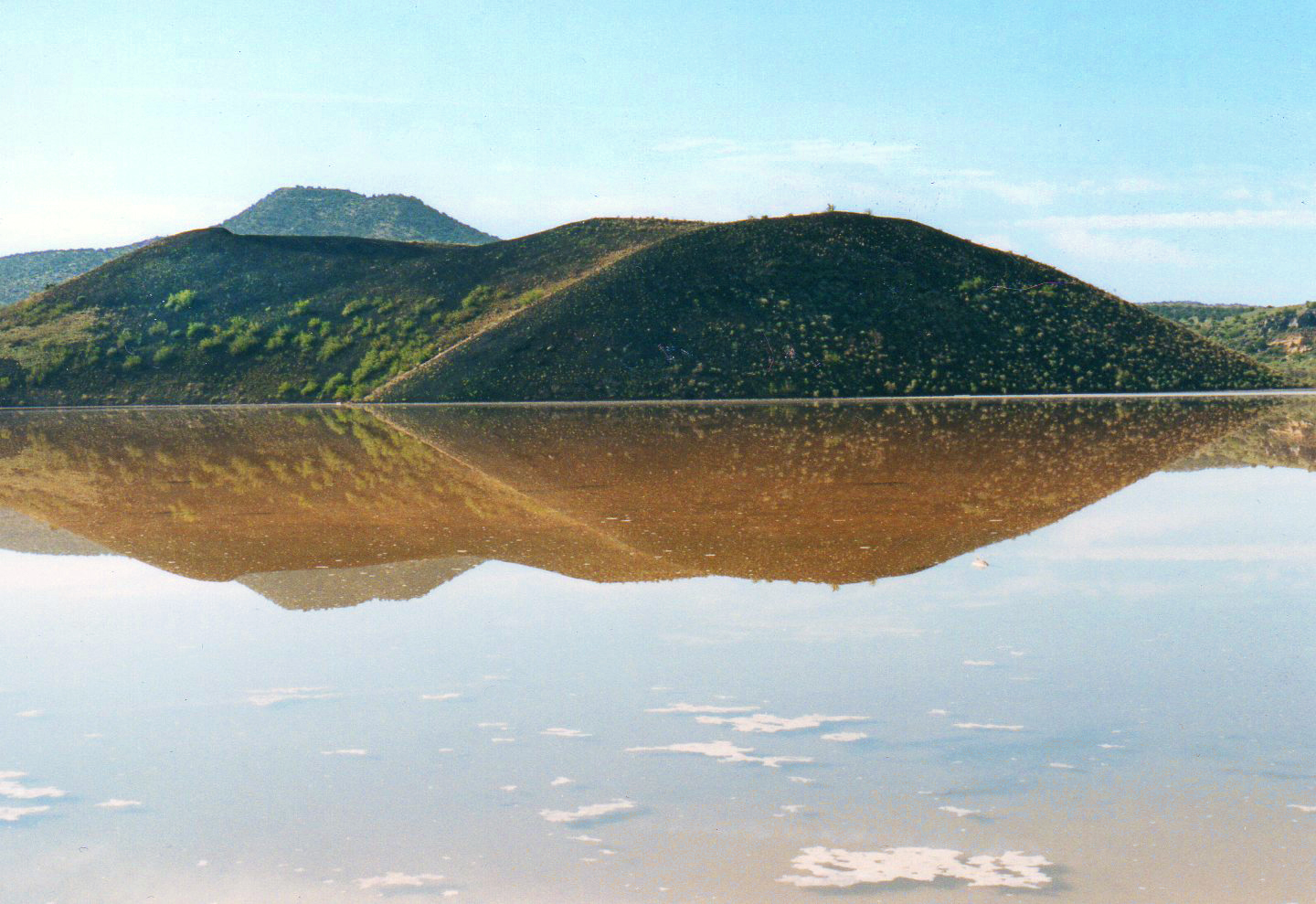
Zuni Salt Lake, New Mexico, where the Zuni have harvested salt for centuries

Zuni culture is associated with Mogollon and Ancestral Pueblo peoples cultures, who lived in the deserts of New Mexico, Arizona, Utah, and southern Colorado for over two millennia. White Mound was one such settlement of pit houses, farming, and storerooms, built around 700 A.D., followed by the village of Kʼya:dul Łana (Kiatuthlanna) around 800 A.D., and Allantown around 1000 A.D. These Mogollon villages included kivas. Likewise, Zuni ancestors were in contact with the Ancestral Puebloans at Chaco Canyon around 1100. The Zuni settlement called Village of the Great Kivas, was built around 1100, and included nine kivas. The Zuni region, however, was probably only sparsely populated by small agricultural settlements until the 12th century when the population and the size of the settlements began to increase. The large villages of Heshot Uła, Betatakin, and Kiet Siel were established by 1275. By the 13th century, villages were built on top of mesas, including Heshoda Aʼtsʼina (Atsinna) on Inscription Rock. In the 14th century, the Zuni inhabited a dozen pueblos containing between 180 and 1,400 rooms, while the Ancestral Puebloans abandoned larger settlements for smaller ones, or established new ones along the Rio Grande. The Zuni did move from the eastern portion of their territory to the western side, and built six new villages, Halona: (Halona), Hawikku (Hawikuh), Kyaki:ma (Kiakima), Matsʼa:kya (Matsaki), Kwaʼkinʼa (Kwakina), and Kechiba:wa. (Note: Kechipaun; also Kechipauan or Kechipauen.) Halona: was located 97 km (60 mi) north of Zuni Salt Lake (Maʼkʼyayʼa), and the Zuni traded in salt, corn and turquoise. Hawikuh was claimed by Niza to be one of the Seven Cities of Cibola, a legendary 16th century wealthy empire.

In 1539, Moorish slave Estevanico led an advance party of Fray Marcos de Niza's Spanish expedition. Sponsored by Antonio de Mendoza who wanted Niza to "explain to the natives of the land that there is only one God in heaven, and the Emperor on earth to rule and govern it, whose subjects they all must become and whom they must serve." The Zuni reportedly killed Estevanico as a spy, or for being "greedy, voracious and bold". This was Spain's first contact with any of the Pueblo peoples. Francisco Vásquez de Coronado expedition followed in the wake of Niza's Seven Cities of Cibola claim. Sponsored once again by Mendoza, Coronado led 230 soldiers on horseback, 70 foot soldiers, several Franciscan priests and Mexican natives. The Spanish met 600 Zuni warriors near Hawikuh in July 1540, inflicting several casualties, and capturing the village. Coronado continued to the Rio Grande, but several priests and soldiers stayed an additional two years. The Chamuscado and Rodríguez Expedition followed in 1581, and Antonio de Espejo in 1583. Juan de Oñate visited Zuni territory in 1598 and 1604 looking for copper mines, but without success. Francisco Manuel de Silva Nieto established a mission at Hawikuh in 1629 with two Franciscan priests. They completed a church compound in 1632, and established a second mission in Halona:. Shortly afterwards, the Zuni destroyed the missions, killing two priests, and then retreated to Dowa Yalanne, where they remained for the next three years. The Spanish built another mission in Halona: in 1643.

Before the Pueblo Revolt of 1680, the Zuni lived in six villages. After the revolt, until 1692, they took refuge in a defensible position atop Dowa Yalanne, a steep mesa 5 km (3.1 miles) southeast of the present Pueblo of Zuni; Dowa means "corn", and yalanne means "mountain". After the establishment of peace and the return of the Spanish, the Zuni relocated to their present location, returning to the mesa top only briefly in 1703. By the end of the 17th century, only Halona: was still inhabited of the original six villages. Yet, satellite villages were settled around Halona:, and included Nutria, Kʼyaʼnaʼa (Ojo Caliente), and Heshoda Tsʼina (Pescado).

Of the three Zuni missions, only the church at Halona: was rebuilt after the reconquest. According to Nancy Bonvillain, "Indeed, by the late eighteenth century, Spanish authorities had given up hope of dominating the Zuni and other western Pueblo Indians, and in 1799 only seven Spanish people were recorded as living among the Zuni.". In 1821, the Franciscans ended their missionary efforts.

In 1848, U.S. Army Lt. Col. Henderson P. Boyakin signed a treaty with Zuni and Navajo leaders stating the Zuni "shall be protected in the full management of all their rights of Private Property and Religion...[by] the authorities, civil and military, of New Mexico and the United States." Observing the Zuni in the 1850s, Balduin Möllhausen noted "In all directions, fields of wheat and maize, as well as gourds and melons, bore testimony to their industry."

The Zuni Reservation was created by the United States federal government in 1877, and enlarged by a second Executive order in 1883.

Frank Hamilton Cushing, an anthropologist associated with the Smithsonian Institution, lived with the Zuni from 1879 to 1884. He was one of the first non-native participant-observers and ethnologists at Zuni. In 1979, it was reported that some members of the Pueblo consider he had wrongfully documented the Zuni way of life, exploiting them by photographing and revealing sacred traditions and ceremonies.

During the early 2000s, the Zuni opposed the development of a coal mine near the Zuni Salt Lake, a site sacred to the Zuni and under Zuni control. The mine would have extracted water from the aquifer below the lake and would also have involved construction between the lake and the Zuni. The plan was abandoned in 2003 after several lawsuits.

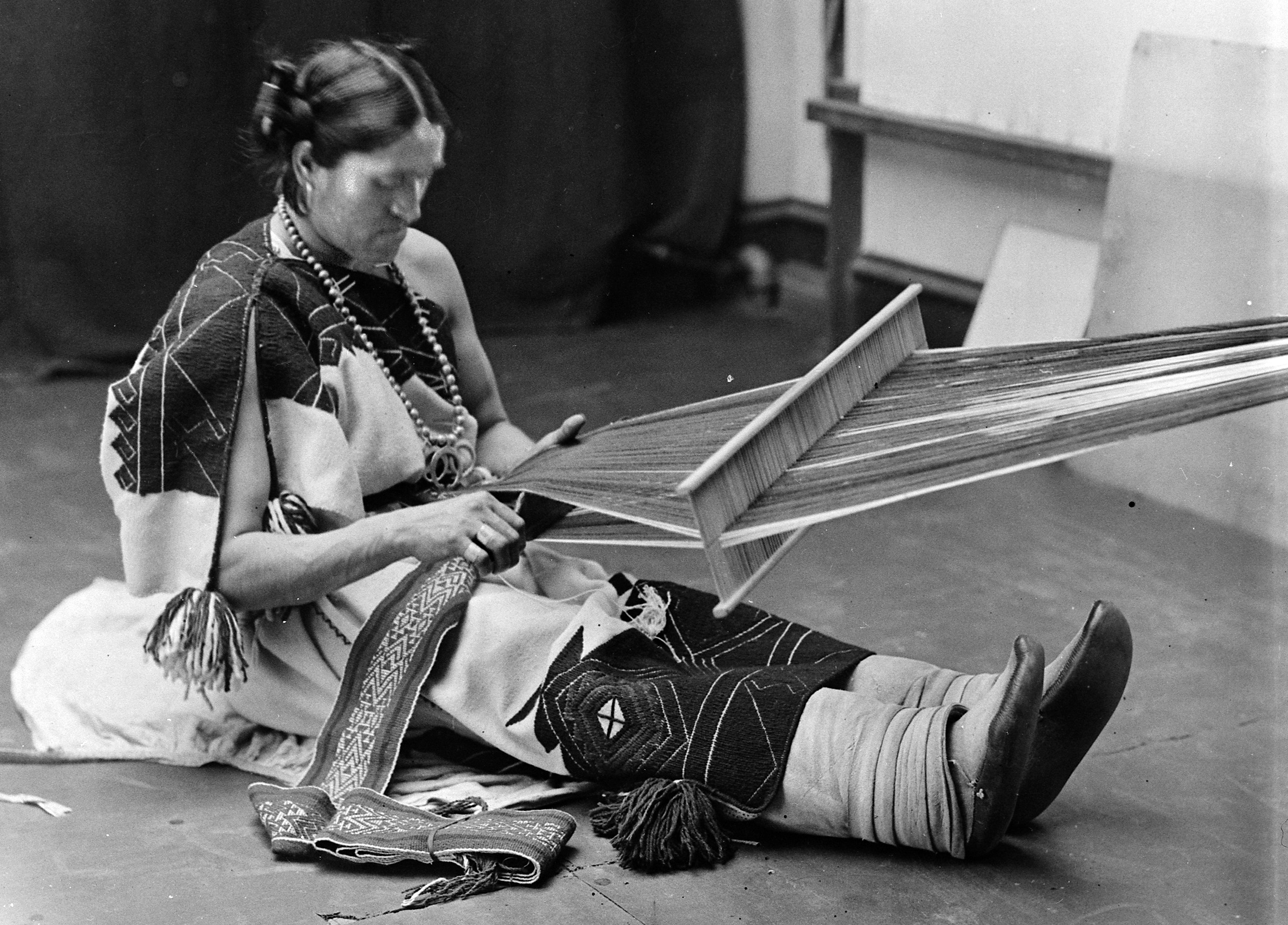
We'Wha (1849–1896), a celebrated Zuni lhamana weaver at work on a backstrap loom, photo: John K. Hillers, c. 1871–1907

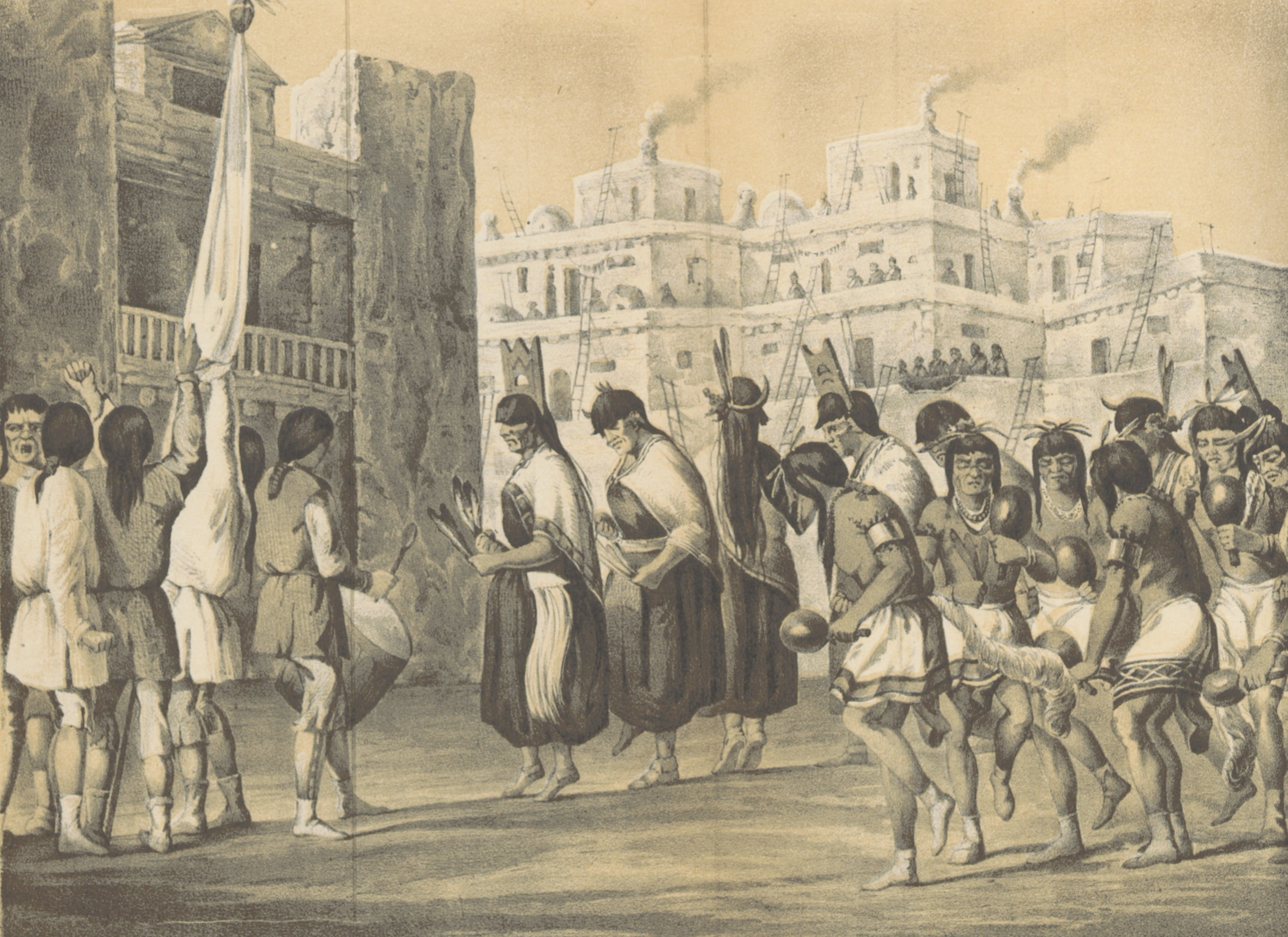
Image of Zuni Pueblo created during the U.S. Army Corps of Topographical Engineers's 1851 expedition to Arizona which was led by Captain Sitgreaves

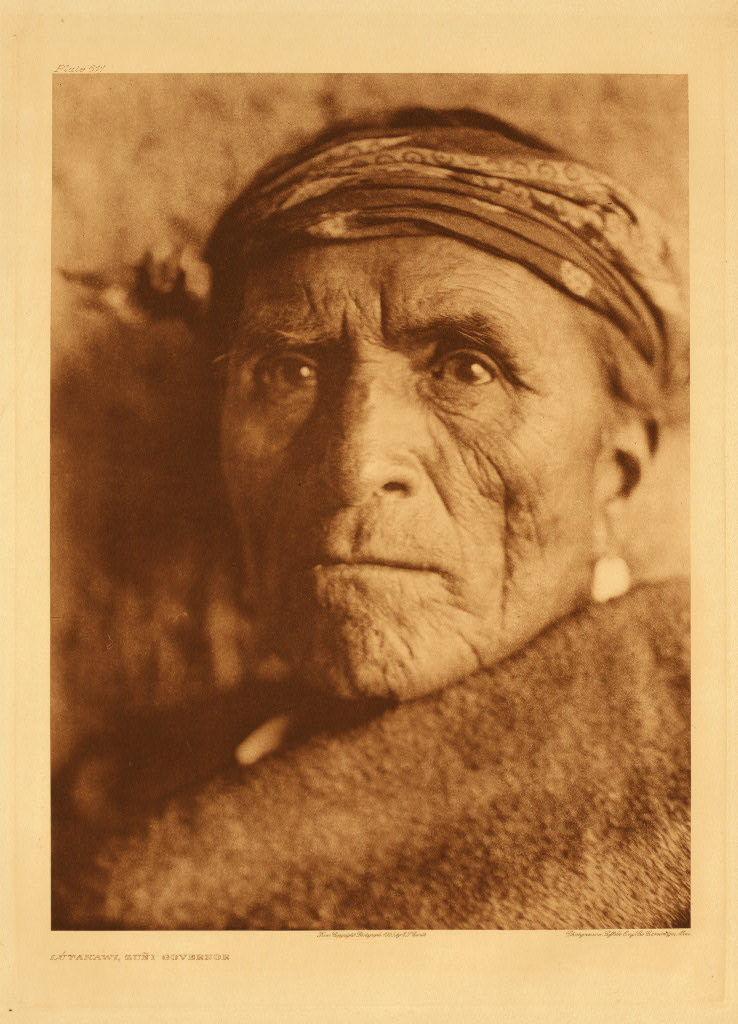
Lutakawi, Zuni Governor, photographed before 1925 by Edward S. Curtis

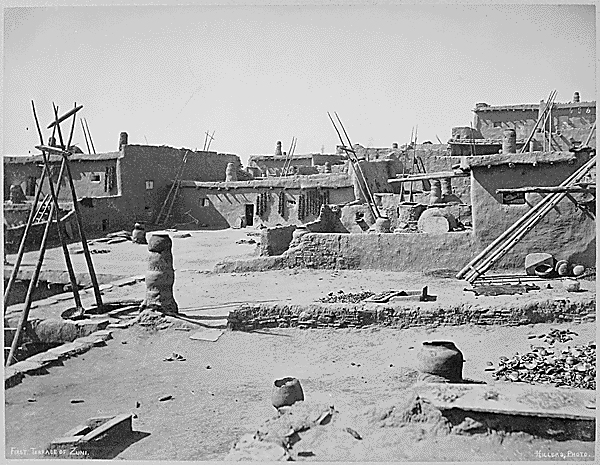
Zuni pueblo middle court, in 1879

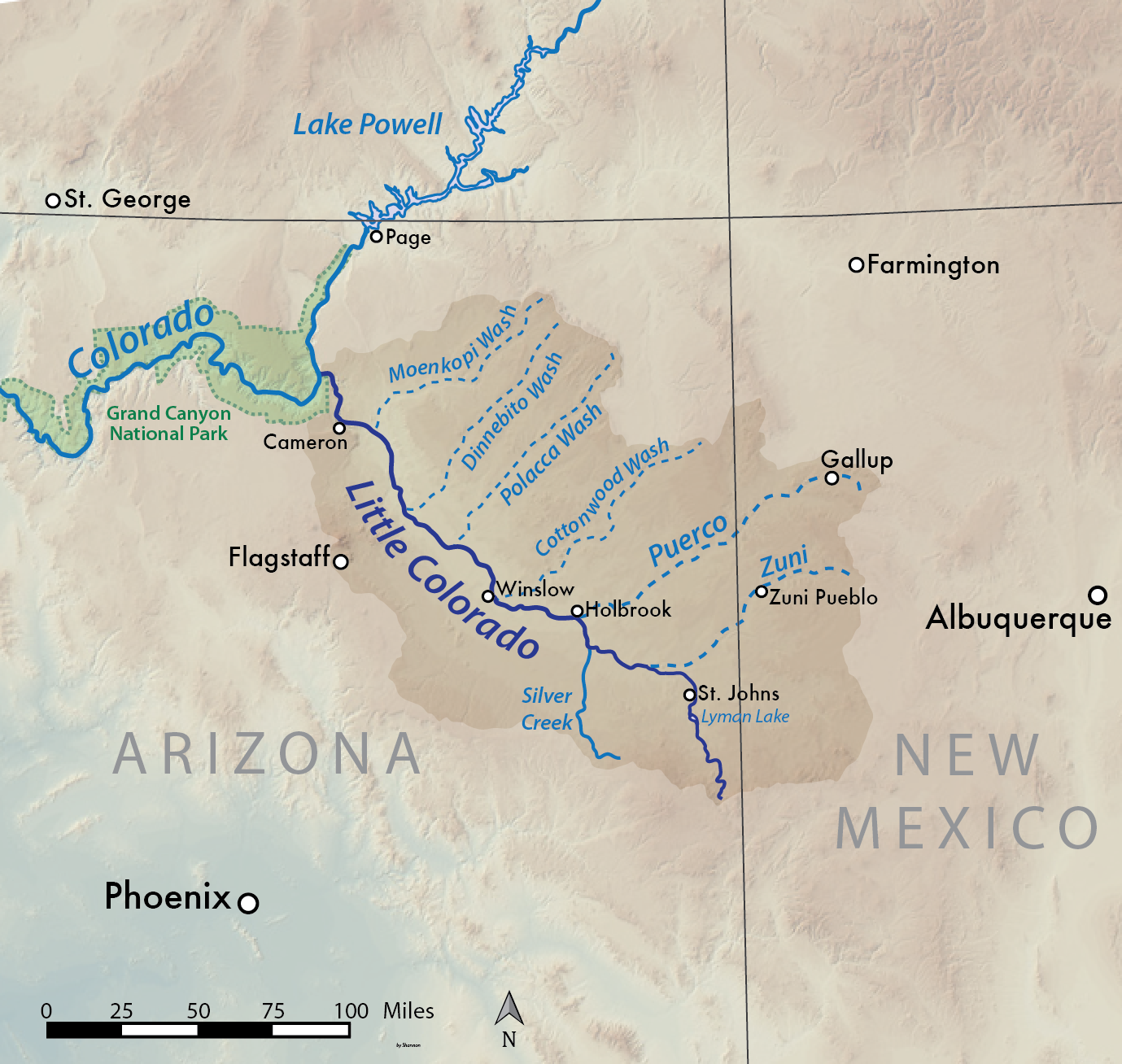
Zuni River, Zuni Pueblo, New Mexico. The Zuni people have inhabited the Zuni River valley since the last millennium BCE

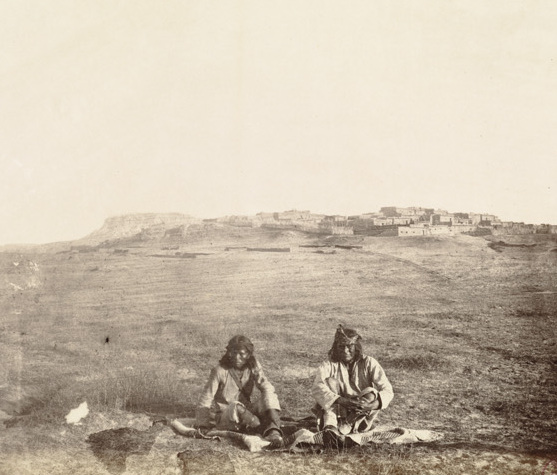
Zuni men and the ancient Pueblo Town of Zuni, c. 1868

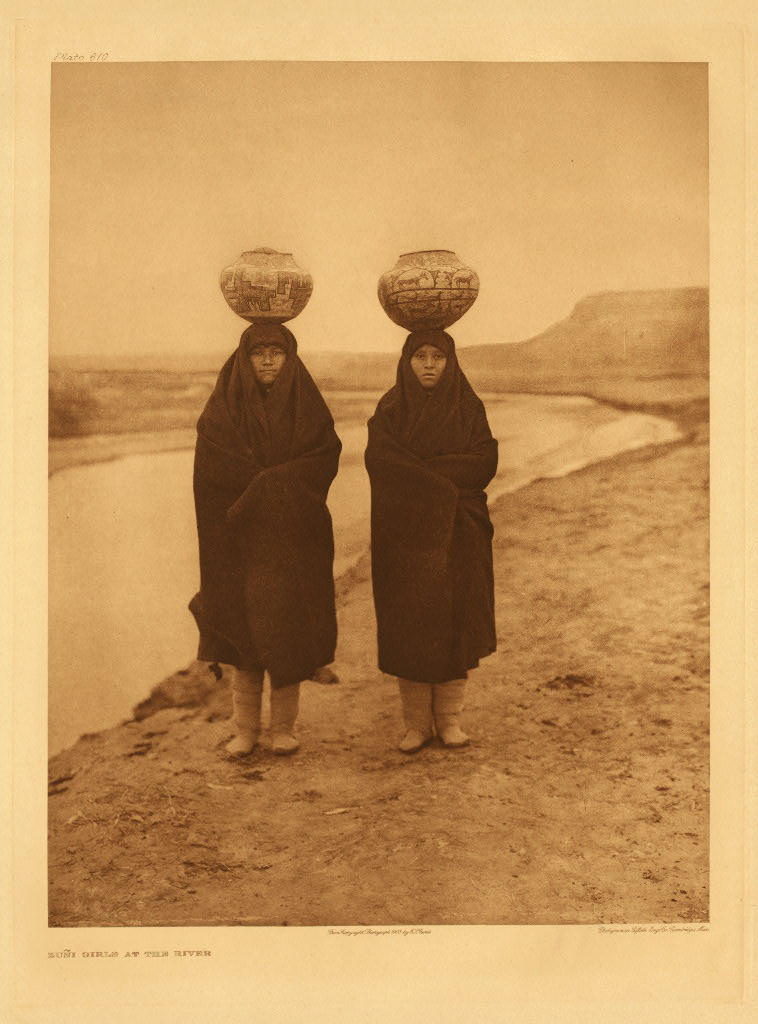
Two Zuni girls, photographed by Edward S. Curtis, c. 1926

== Culture ==
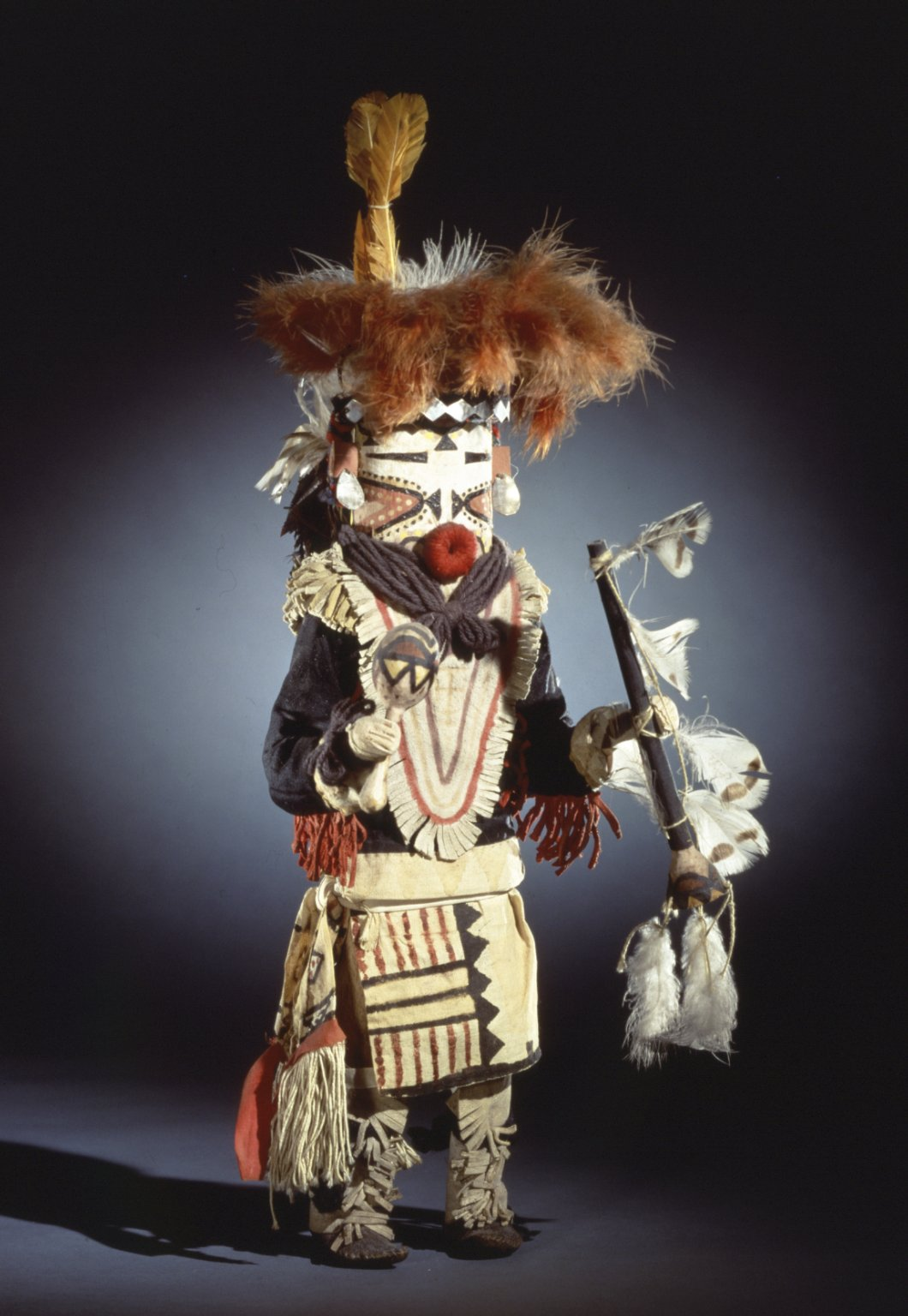
She-we-na (Zuni Pueblo). Kachina doll (Paiyatemu), late 19th century. Brooklyn Museum

The Zuni traditionally speak the Zuni language, a language isolate that has no known relationship to any other Native American language. Linguists believe that the Zuni have maintained the integrity of their language for 6,000-to-7,000 years. The Zuni do, however, share a number of words from Keresan, Hopi, and Pima pertaining to religion. The Zuni continue to practice their traditional religion with its regular ceremonies and dances, and an independent and unique belief system.

The Zuni were and are a traditional people who live by irrigated agriculture and raising livestock. Gradually the Zuni farmed less and turned to sheep and cattle herding as a means of economic development. Their success as a desert agri-economy is due to careful management and conservation of resources, as well as a complex system of community support. Many contemporary Zuni also rely on the sale of traditional arts and crafts. Some Zuni still live in the old-style Pueblos, while others live in modern houses. Their location is relatively isolated, but they welcome respectful tourists.

The Zuni Tribal Fair and rodeo is held the third weekend in August. The Zuni also participate in the Gallup Inter-Tribal Ceremonial, usually held in early or mid-August. The A:shiwi A:wan Museum and Heritage Center is a tribal museum that showcases Zuni history, culture, and arts.

=== Ethnobotany ===
The Zuni people maintain an extensive and sophisticated ethnobotanical tradition, utilizing a diverse array of local flora for sustenance, medicinal purposes, and ceremonial practices. For an extensive list, see the main article, "Zuni ethnobotany". Zuni have developed knowledge of local plants that are used for medical practices and religious rites.

=== Pottery ===
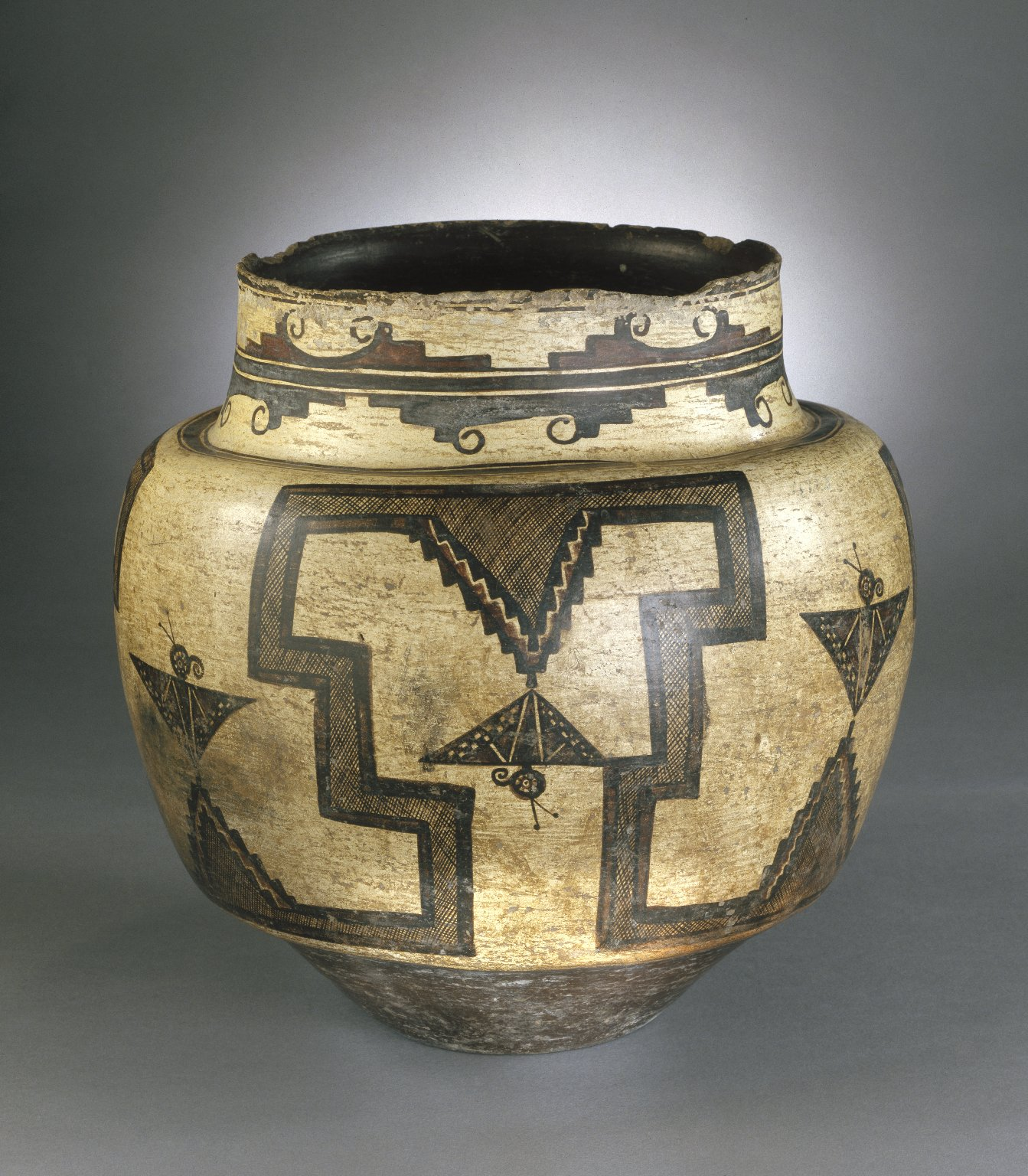
Water Jar, 1825–1850, Brooklyn Museum

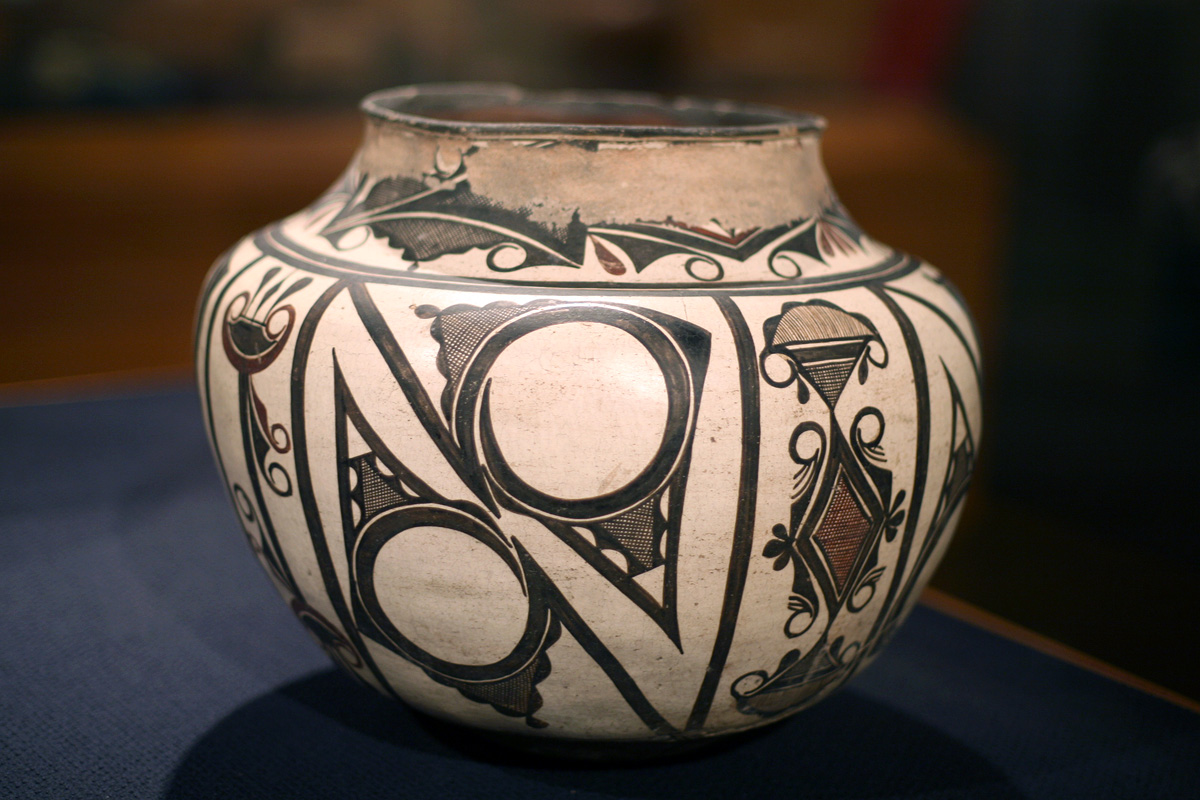
Zuni olla, late 19th – early 20th century, 12.5″ high, Brooklyn Museum

Traditionally, Zuni women made pottery for storing food and water. They used symbols of their clans for designs. Clay for the pottery is sourced locally. Prior to its extraction, the women give thanks to the Earth Mother (Awidelin Tsitda) according to ritual. The clay is ground, sifted, mixed with water, rolled into a coil, shaped into a vessel or other design, and scraped smooth with a scraper. A thin layer of finer clay, called slip, is applied to the surface for extra smoothness and color. The vessel is polished with a stone after it dries. It is painted with home-made organic dyes, using a traditional yucca brush. The shape and painted images depend on the intended purpose of the pottery. To fire the pottery, the Zuni used animal dung in traditional kilns. Today, Zuni potters might use electric kilns. While the firing was usually a community enterprise, silence or communication in low voices was considered essential in order to maintain the original "voice" of the "being" of the clay, and the purpose of the end product. Sales of pottery and traditional arts provide a major source of income for many Zuni people today. An artisan may be the sole financial support for her immediate family as well as others. Many women make pottery or, more rarely, clothing or baskets. Brown, black and red ornamentation can be found on traditional Zuni pots that are first covered with white slip. Common motifs are spiral scrolls edged with triangles, deer, as well as frogs, dragonflies and other symbols associated with rain and water. In addition to pots, Zuni produce owl figurines that are covered with white slip and painted with black and red motifs before firing.

=== Carving and silversmithing ===
Zuni also make fetishes and necklaces for the purpose of rituals and trade, and more recently for sale to collectors.

The Zuni are known for their fine lapidary work. Zuni jewelers set hand-cut turquoise and other stones in silver. Today jewelry-making thrives as an art form among the Zuni. Many Zuni have become master stone-cutters. Techniques used include mosaic and channel inlay to create intricate designs and unique patterns.

Two specialties of Zuni jewelers are needlepoint and petit point. In making needlepoint, small, slightly oval-shaped stones with pointed ends are set in silver bezels, close to one another and side by side to create a pattern. The technique is normally used with turquoise, sometimes with coral and occasionally with other stones in creating necklaces, bracelets, earrings and rings. Petit point is made in the same fashion as needlepoint, except that one end of each stone is pointed, and the other end is rounded.

=== Religion ===
Religion is central to Zuni life. Their traditional religious beliefs are centered on the three most powerful of their deities: Earth Mother, Sun Father, and Moonlight-Giving Mother. The religion is katsina-based, and ceremonies occur during winter solstice, summer, harvest, and again in winter. Both Zuni men and women contribute to the religious practices, and deities of both genders are honored through ceremonies.

Priesthood includes three priests (north, above and below), and Pekwin (the above priest) determines the religious calendar. A religious society is associated with each of the six kivas, and each boy is initiated into one of these societies by his ceremonial father around the age of five or six.

=== Shalako ===
Shalako is a series of ceremonial dances that take place throughout the night on or around the winter solstice. They are closed to non-native individuals unless there is a personal invitation by a tribal member. The ceremony also blesses the houses that were built during the year. The blessing takes the form of singing that accompanies six dancers who are dressed in Shalako outfits. These outfits can be as high as eight feet; the dancers wearing them represent "couriers of the rain deities come to bless new homes". The dancers move from house to house throughout the night; at dawn Saiyatasha performs a final prayer and the ceremony is complete.

=== Marriage and the Household ===
The Zuni are organized into matrilocal households headed by the eldest woman of a lineage. Descent is traced through matrilineal lines, and it is the female offspring of a mother who inherit claim to her lands. With the emergence of contemporary economic, political, and social pressures, the Zuni have shifted away from specialized forms of labor and instead focus on household-based income centered primarily around the production of crafts.

Marriage is marked by an exchange of gifts between female relatives of the marrying couple and the husband's sharing of a meal with his wife's family. Female relatives are also responsible for wedding preparations, such as dressing the bride. The Zuni practice exogamy, and marriage within one's matrilineal line is not observed. Married couples may divorce, and either the husband or wife may initiate it. If a husband chooses to end his marriage, he leaves his wife's household and returns to that of his mother. If a wife chooses to end her marriage, she places her husband's belongings outside of the home. The husband then must collect his belongings and leave, returning to his mother's household.

== In popular culture ==
In the novel Brave New World, one of the main characters is a man named John of British descent who grew up among a community of Zuni people in New Mexico.

== Gallery ==
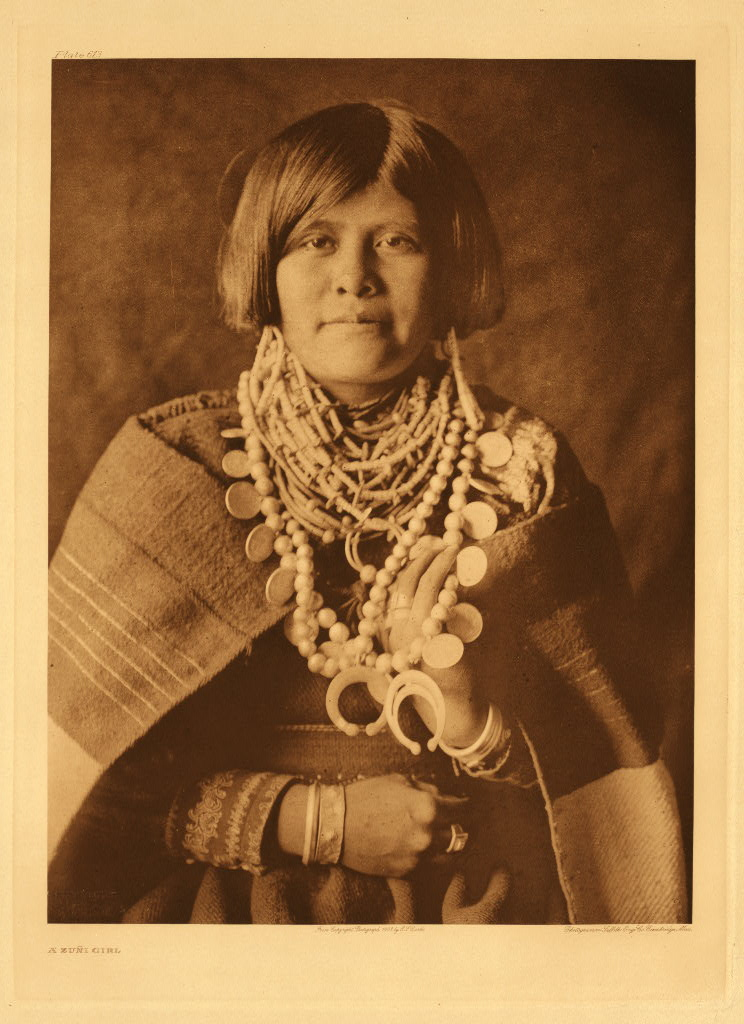
Zuni Girl, photographed by Edward S. Curtis

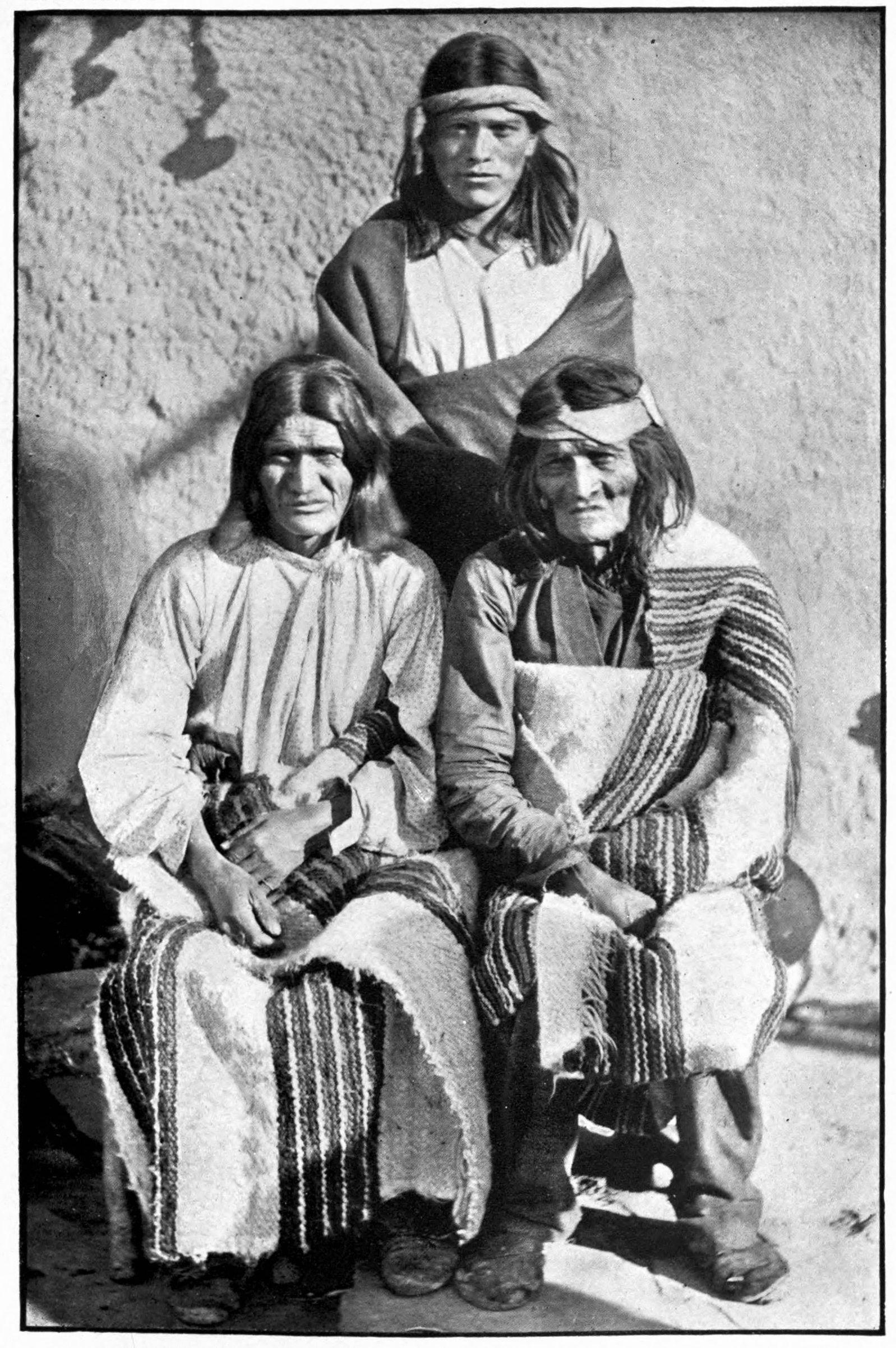
Zuñis in typical modern costume, 1896

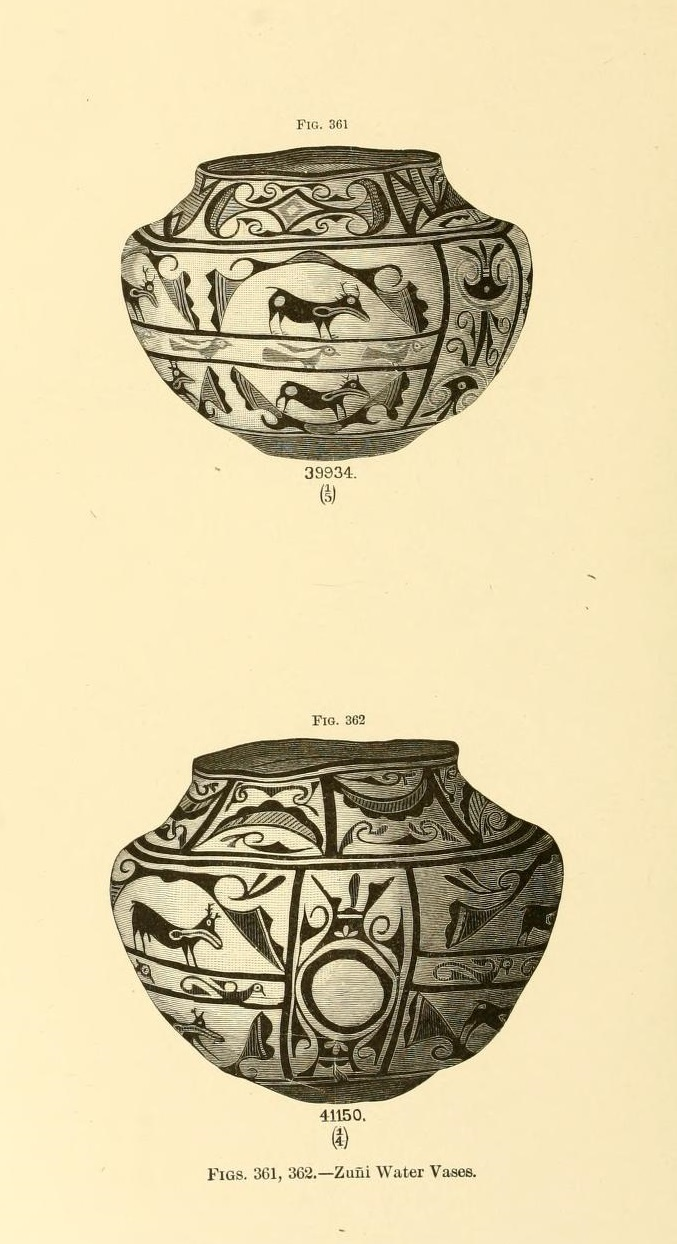
Zuni water vases

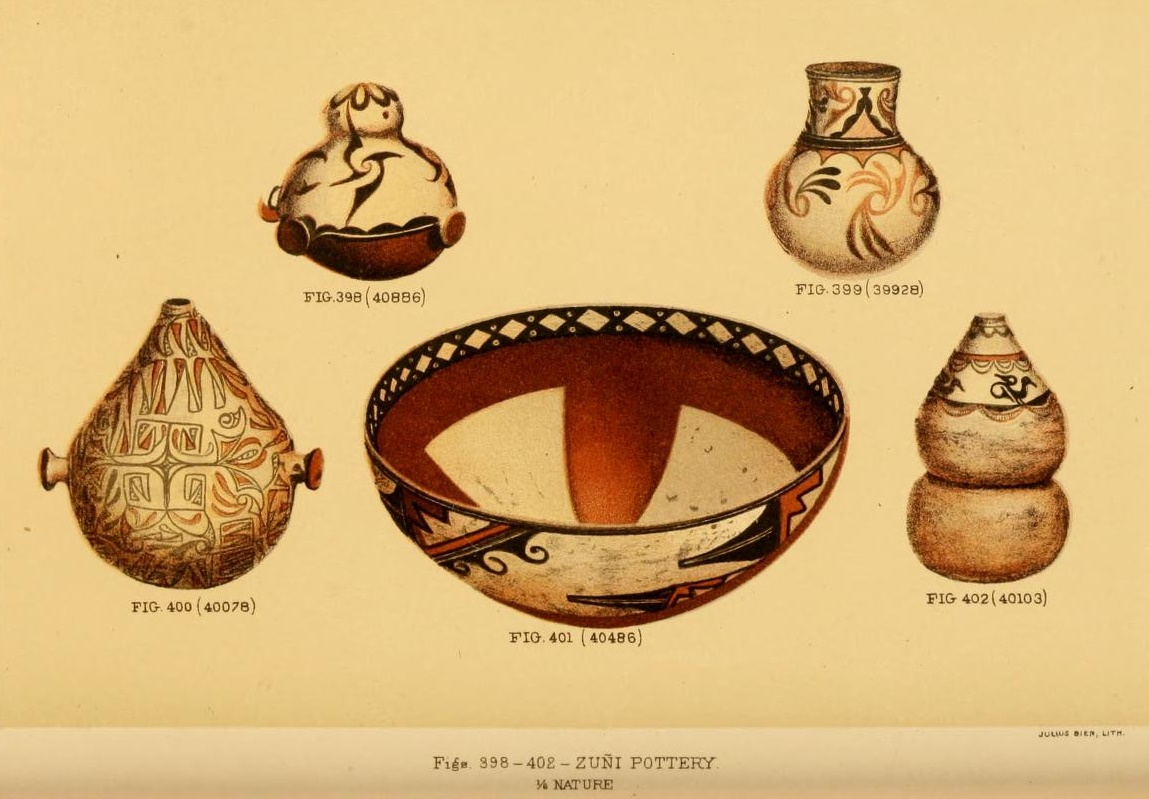
Zuni pottery

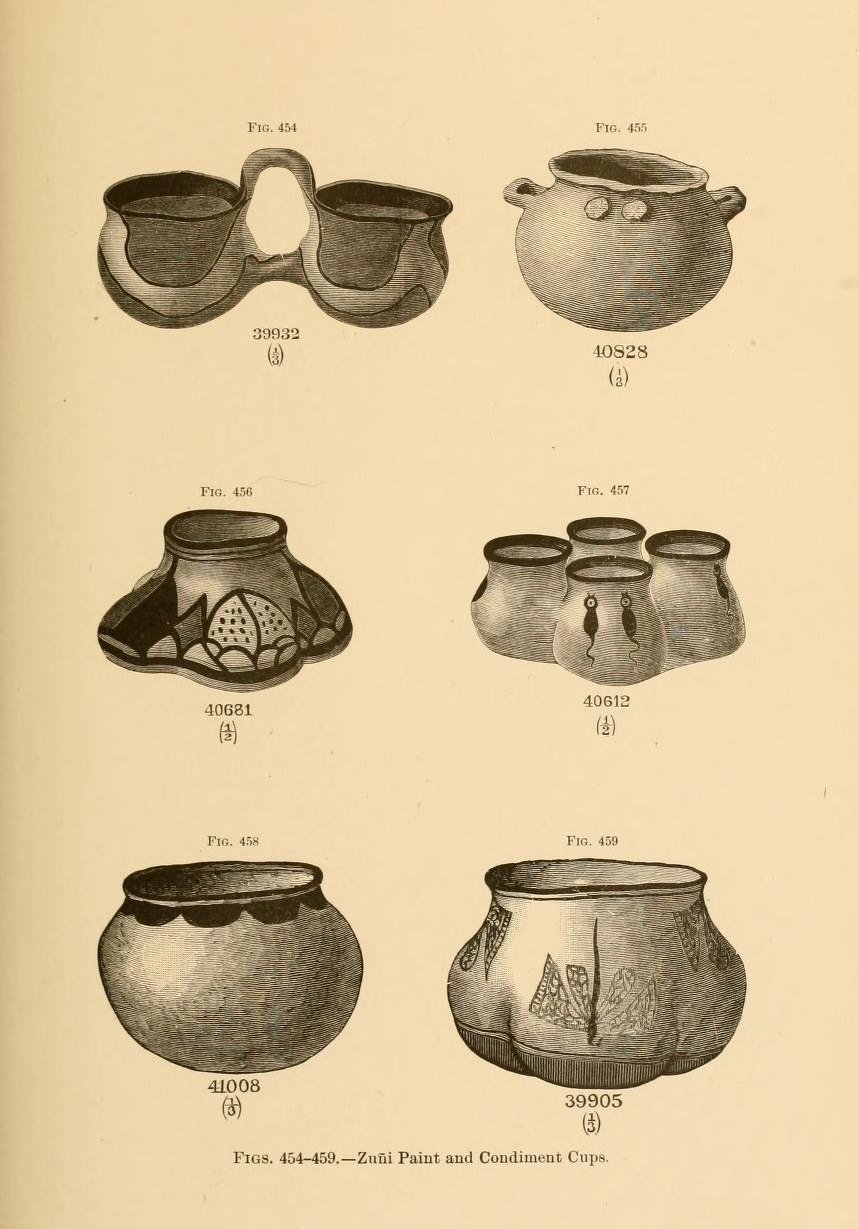
Zuni paint and condiment cups

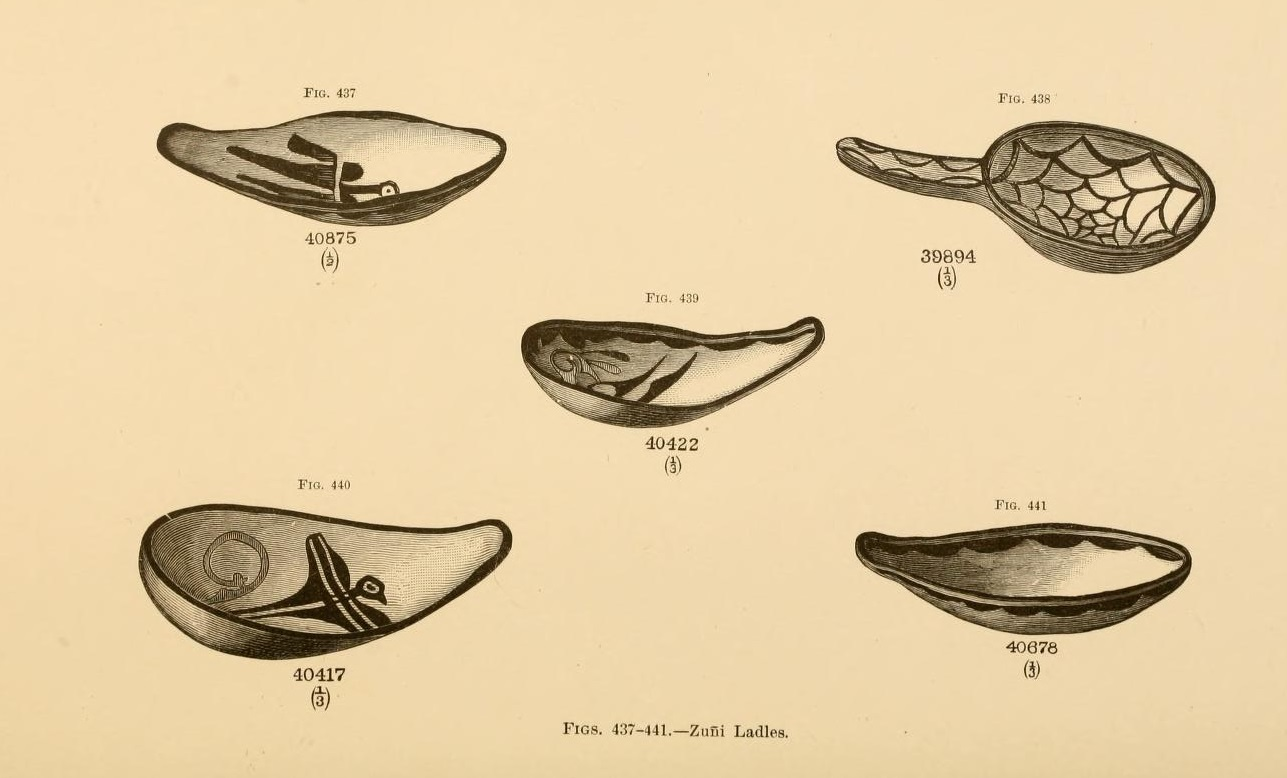
Zuni ceramic ladles

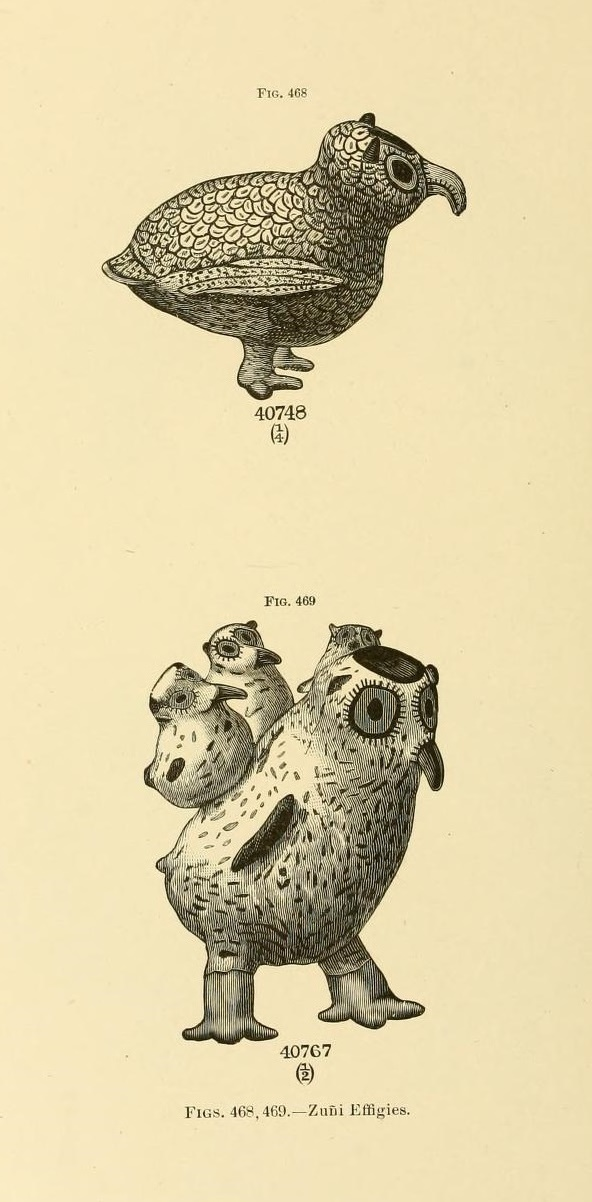
Zuni bird effigies

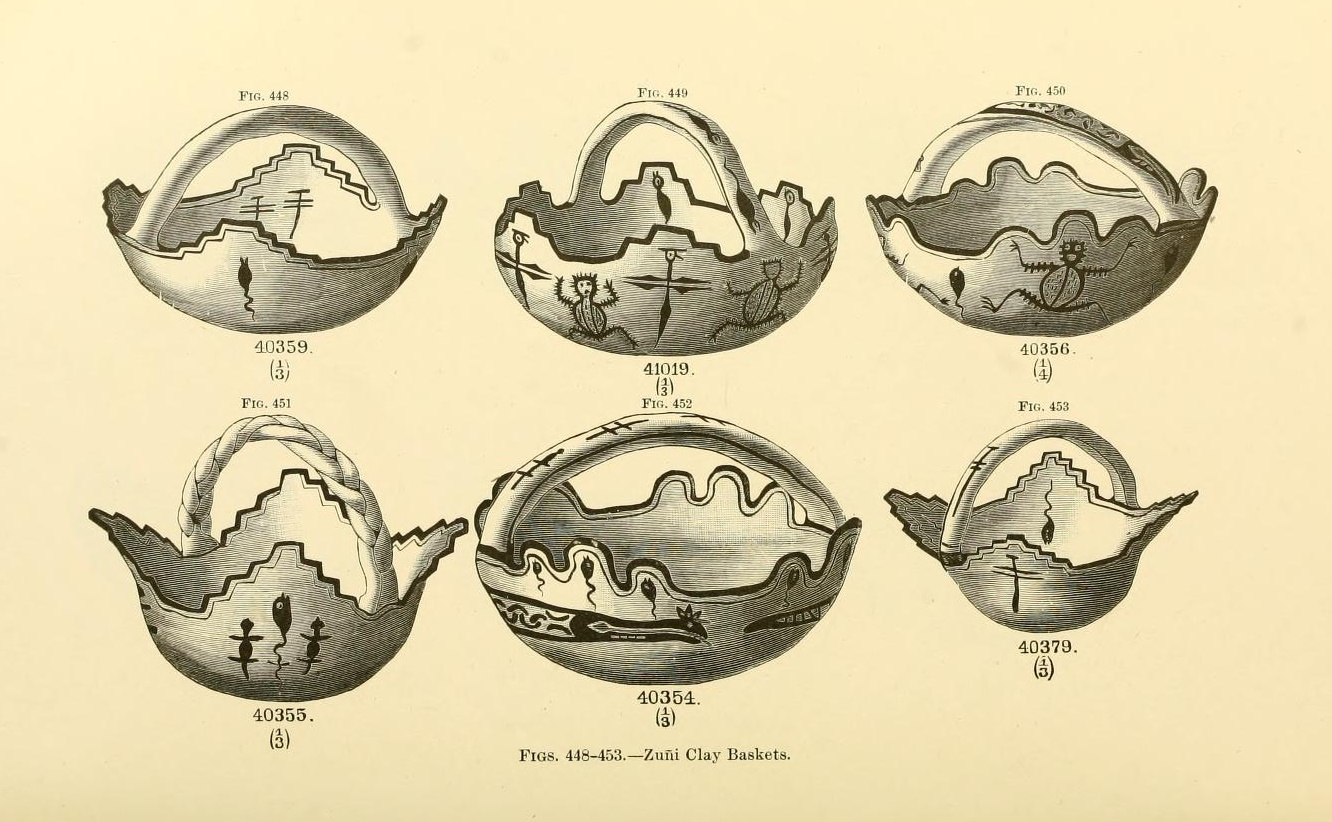
Zuni clay baskets

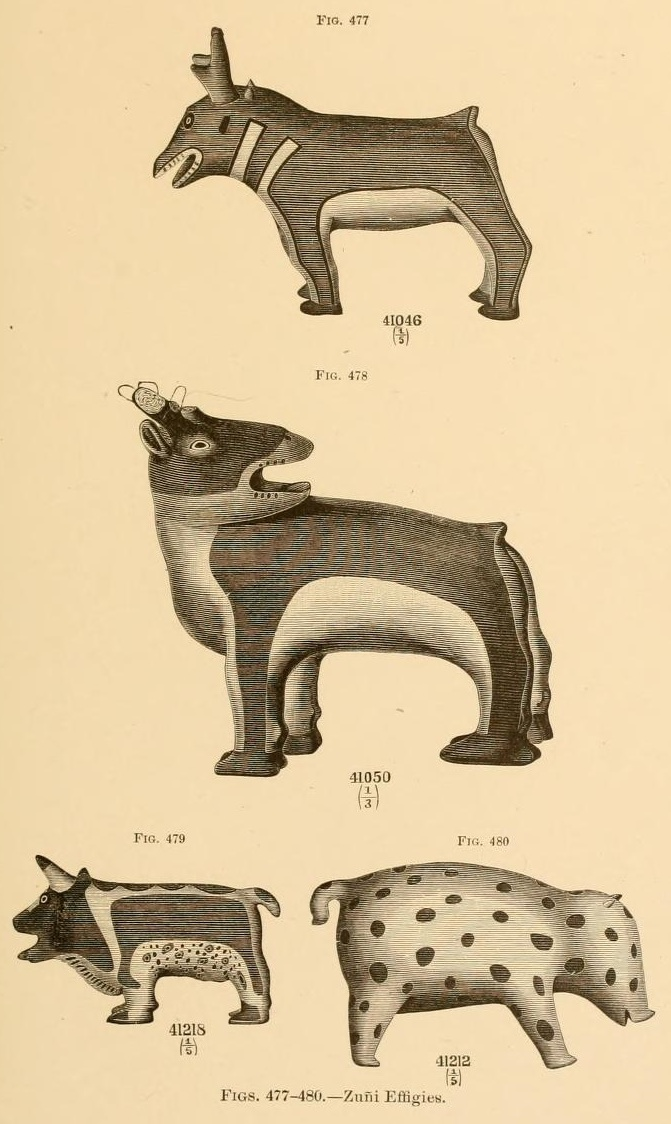
Zuni animal effigies

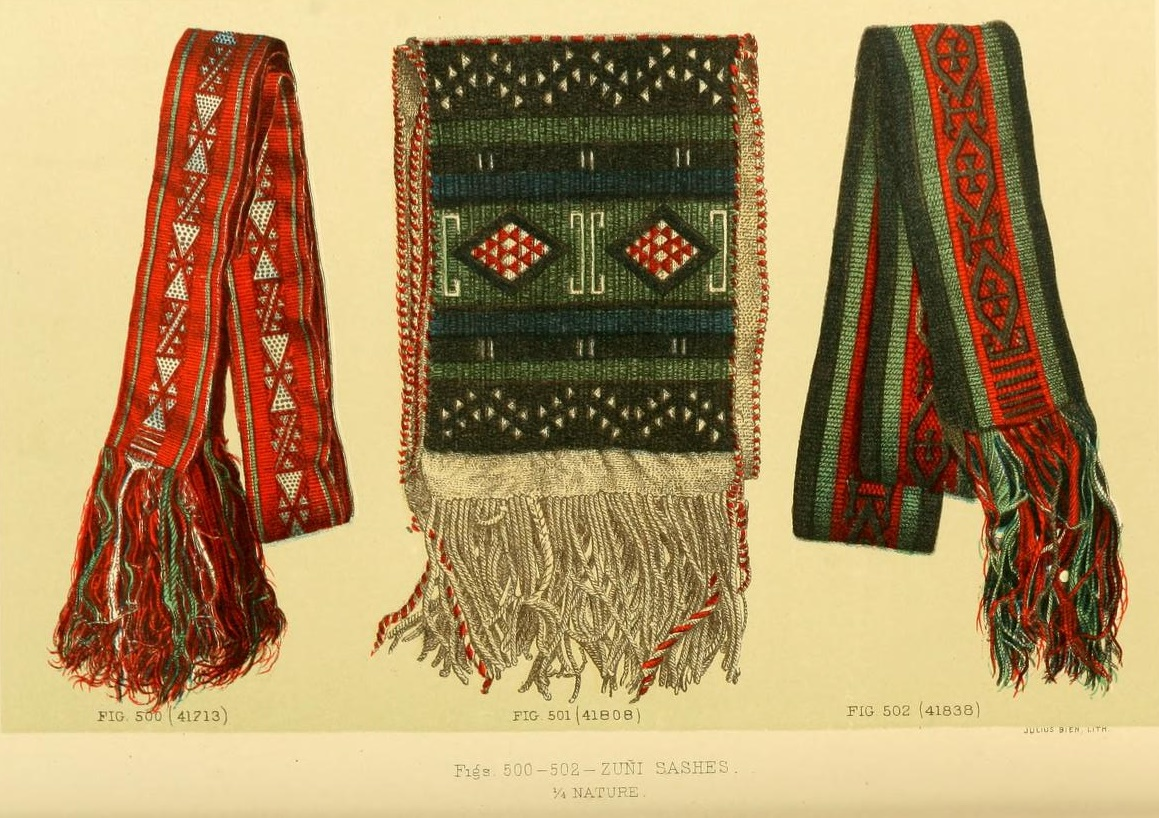
Zuni woven sashes

== Notable Zuni people ==
- Gomeo Bobelu, jeweler and activist
- Emily Pinto, painter
- Flora Zuni, linguist and storyteller
- Percy Tsisete Sandy (Kai-Sa [Red Moon]), painter
- We'wha, lhamana (two spirit) cultural ambassador and weaver

== See also ==
- Zuni Reservation
- Zuni language
- Zuni mythology
- Zuniceratops
- Zuni Pueblo, New Mexico
