= CABA =

CABA or Caba may refer to:

- Autonomous City of Buenos Aires (Ciudad Autónoma de Buenos Aires)
- Chartered Accountants Benevolent Association
- Compressed Air Breathing Apparatus
- Continental Automated Buildings Association
- Communauté d'agglomération du Bassin d'Aurillac, France
- Caba, La Union, Philippines, a municipality
- Caba, surname
