= Skyline, Ottawa =

Neighbourhood in Ottawa, Ontario, Canada

Coordinates: 45°21′N 75°44′W

Skyline is a neighbourhood in Knoxdale-Merivale Ward in Ottawa, Ontario, Canada. Prior to amalgamation in 2001, the neighbourhood was located in the City of Nepean. It is bounded on the south by Meadowlands Drive of Parkwood Hills, on the west by Clyde Avenue and Merivale Road, on the north by Baseline Road and on the east by the neighbourhood of Fisher Heights.

Most of the houses were built from the early 1950s to 1970s. The community has Minto property featuring a 12-storey high rise with town houses on Eleanor Drive which is owned by Minto Developments Inc. In the early 2000s some garden homes were built off Eleanor Drive. In 2008, Encore Private was built just off Farlane Drive and Baseline Road.

== Features ==
The neighbourhood includes Meadowlands Mall and Emerald Plaza in the southwest corner. It is also home of the City View Curling Club (despite City View being west of Clyde/Merivale). The neighbourhood is also home to Gilbey Park and Eleanor Park. CTV Ottawa had had its headquarters in Skyline, from the 1950s until February 2010, when its newsroom was gutted by fire.
