= Walter Leuba =

American poet

- Born: 1902; Bronx, New York
- Died: 1983 (aged 80–81); Pittsburgh, Pennsylvania
- Education: Bachelor of arts and Master of arts in social work, University of Pittsburgh, 1947
- Occupation: Book collector
- Spouse(s): Mildred Leuba née Wallach (married 1927-1932), Martha Leuba née Dryburgh (married 1934)
- Children: Julian Christopher Leuba

Walter Leuba (1902–1983) was a poet, writer, and book collector in Pittsburgh, Pennsylvania.

== Early life ==
Leuba was born in the Bronx, New York in 1902. He grew up in Newport, Rhode Island, and moved to Pittsburgh with his family at age 14. Leuba studied fine art, English, and history at Carnegie Mellon University (C.I.T.; now Carnegie Mellon University), and interacted with Porter Garnett, founder of the Laboratory Press at C.I.T. Also, Leuba fostered a friendship with poet Haniel Long, the head of C.I.T.'s English department at the time. Although Leuba left C.I.T. in 1923 without graduating, this experience was formative to his life as a book collector.

== Writing ==
Leuba was a prolific writer. While living in New York as a bachelor, Leuba wrote a book of verse poetry, Legend, published in 1925 under the name Paul Sandoz. Leuba continued to write after returning to Pittsburgh and establishing himself. In addition to regular letters published in newspapers, he wrote Poems out of a Hat, published by Macmillan Publishers, as well as other self-published works, including poetry collections No Other Mirror and Quips and Cranks, the "prose-poem" Crusade, and Two Essays on Bach. Leuba contributed to literary journals and wrote two published books with Ernest Nevin Dilworth (Smith Unbound, and Two Dialogues: Norman Douglas and George Santayana), as well as other collaborative works.

== Personal life ==
Leuba married Mildred Wallach in 1927. The couple had one son, Julian Christopher Leuba, born in 1929, who is a noted musician. Mildred Leuba died in December 1932. Leuba began working for the Allegheny County Board of Assistance as a case worker in 1934, and was supervisor of the board by 1942. He earned a B.A. and an M.A. in social work from the University of Pittsburgh in 1947, and continued working in public assistance in Pittsburgh for most of his life. In 1938, Walter Leuba married Martha Leuba (née Dryburgh), with whom he lived in their house-cum-library at 516 Jacksonia Street in Pittsburgh until his death in 1983.

== Legacy and collection ==
The Leubas began donating portions of their collections to the University of Pittsburgh's Special Collections during the 1970s, and Special Collections received the remainder of the expansive collection after Martha Leuba's death in 1988. This marked a major change of heart for Walter Leuba, who said to an interviewer from the University of Pittsburgh, said he would not donate his books to the Hillman Library, continuing, "...I would no more dream of leaving them to a local library than jumping in the river." In all, Leuba donated over 11,000 volumes and at least 700 woodblock prints. The contents of the Leuba's home were inventoried and catalogued and are held by the University of Pittsburgh University Library System Special Collections Department.
