= Álvar Núñez Cabeza de Vaca =

Spanish explorer of the New World

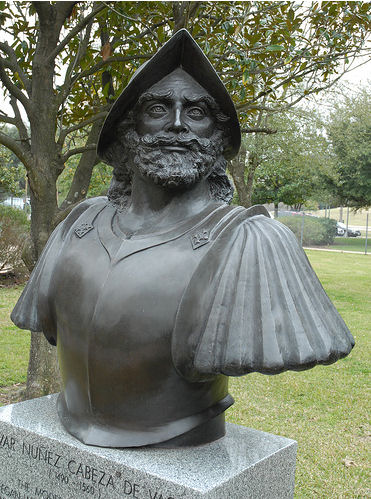
- Bust of Cabeza de Vaca in Houston, Texas
- Born: Álvar Núñez Cabeza de Vaca c. 1488/1490/1492; Jerez de la Frontera, Castile
- Died: After 19 May 1559 (aged over 66–71); Jerez de la Frontera or Valladolid, Spain
- Resting place: Spain
- Occupations: Treasurer, explorer, author of La relación y comentarios, and ex-governor of Río de Plata in Argentina
- Spouse: María Marmolejo
- Parent(s): Francisco de Vera Mendoza y Hinojosa (father); María Teresa Cabeza de Vaca y Zurita (mother)

Signature
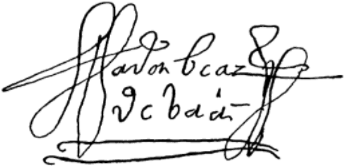

Modern Coat of Arms of the Cabeza de Vaca family

Álvar Núñez Cabeza de Vaca (Spanish pronunciation: [ˈalβaɾ ˈnuɲeθ kaˈβeθa ðe ˈβaka]; c. 1488/90/92 – after 19 May 1559) was a Spanish explorer of the New World, and one of four survivors of the 1527 Narváez expedition. During eight years of travelling across what is today the Southwestern United States, he became a trader, evangelist, and faith healer to various Native American tribes before reconnecting with Spanish civilization in Mexico in 1536.

After returning to Spain in 1537, he wrote an account of his experiences, first published in 1542 as La relación y comentarios ("The Account and Commentaries"), and later retitled Naufragios y comentarios ("Shipwrecks and Commentaries"). Cabeza de Vaca is sometimes considered a proto-anthropologist for his detailed accounts of the many tribes of Native Americans that he encountered. He has been portrayed as a unique explorer with a focus on expansion and faith conversion.

In 1540, Cabeza de Vaca was appointed adelantado of what is now Paraguay, where he was governor and captain general of New Andalusia. He worked to build up the population of Buenos Aires, but in 1544 he was charged with poor administration and arrested. He was subsequently transported to Spain for trial in 1545. Although his sentence was eventually commuted, he never returned to the Americas.

== Early life and family ==
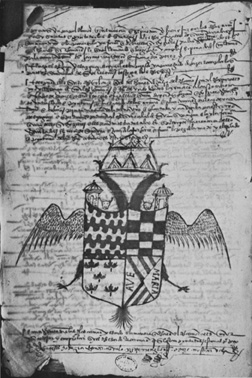
Coat of Arms of Cabeza de Vaca from the Archivo de Indias, Sevilla, Spain. Reprinted in The Odyssey of Cabeza de Vaca by Morris Bishop. New York: The Century Co., 1933.

Álvar Núñez Cabeza de Vaca was born around 1490 in the Andalusian town of Jerez de la Frontera, Cádiz. His father, Francisco de Vera Mendoza y Hinojosa, was an hidalgo, a rank of minor Spanish nobility. His mother was María Teresa Cabeza de Vaca y Zurita, also from an hidalgo family. He was named after his mother's great-grandfather, Álvar Núñez Cabeza de Vaca, (Note: The surname Cabeza de Vaca (meaning "cow head") was granted to his mother's family in the 13th century, when his ancestor Martín Alhaja aided a Christian army attacking Moors by leaving a cow's head and a pile of rocks to point out a small secret mountain pass for their use.) but the real influence in his life was his paternal grandfather, Pedro de Vera y Mendoza.

Pedro de Vera was described by contemporaries as an expert in fighting battles on land and sea. He led raids against the Moors in North Africa and in 1483 completed the conquest of Grand Canaria, one of the major islands of the Canaries. He was appointed military governor of the island and used his position to capture Canary natives (Guanches) and sell them as slaves in Spain. When natives on the neighbouring island of Gomera revolted, he brutally put down the rebellion, killing males over the age of fifteen and selling the women and children into slavery. He was heavily fined for his actions and recalled to Castile in 1490. Cabeza de Vaca would have heard of these exploits growing up; many years later he named a province in South America, Vera, in honour of his grandfather.

Cabeza de Vaca's father and grandfather died around 1506, and his mother died in 1509, leaving behind a modest estate for her seven children. His younger siblings went to live with their aunt, but Álvar had already entered the service of Juan Alfonso Pérez de Guzmán, 3rd Duke of Medina Sidonia in 1503. The house of Medina Sidonia was one of the most powerful in Andalusia and was a dominant force in Seville, the commercial centre of Spain's growing overseas empire. Cabeza de Vaca served as a page and then chamberlain for the duke. In 1511 he travelled to Italy to fight against the French in the Italian Wars. In February 1512 he took part in the Battle of Ravenna where the Spanish were badly defeated, and Cabeza de Vaca was wounded. He later served as the royal standard-bearer in Gaeta, near Naples.

In 1513 he returned to Spain, still in the service of Medina Sidonia. At some point he married María Marmolejo, a member of a prominent converso family in Seville. When the Revolt of the Comuneros broke out in 1520 against the new Spanish king, Charles V, Cabeza de Vaca fought alongside the duke on behalf of the crown. When the comuneros tried unsuccessfully to seize control in Seville in September, the duke put him in charge of defending one of the city gates; in December he fought to liberate the city of Tordesillas; and on 23 April 1521 he participated in the defeat of the comuneros at the battle of Villalar. Later in 1521, when the French king, Francis I, invaded Navarre, Cabeza de Vaca fought against them in the battle of Puente de la Reina.

In 1527, Cabeza de Vaca appeared at the royal court in Valladolid and received an appointment as royal treasurer for an expedition to be led by conquistador Pánfilo de Narváez to explore and conquer La Florida, a portion of North America roughly comprising today's southeastern United States. The reasons for his selection are not known but his history of loyal military service to the crown was certainly a critical qualification. He also had a relative, Luis Cabeza de Vaca, serving on the all-important Council of the Indies.

== Narváez expedition ==
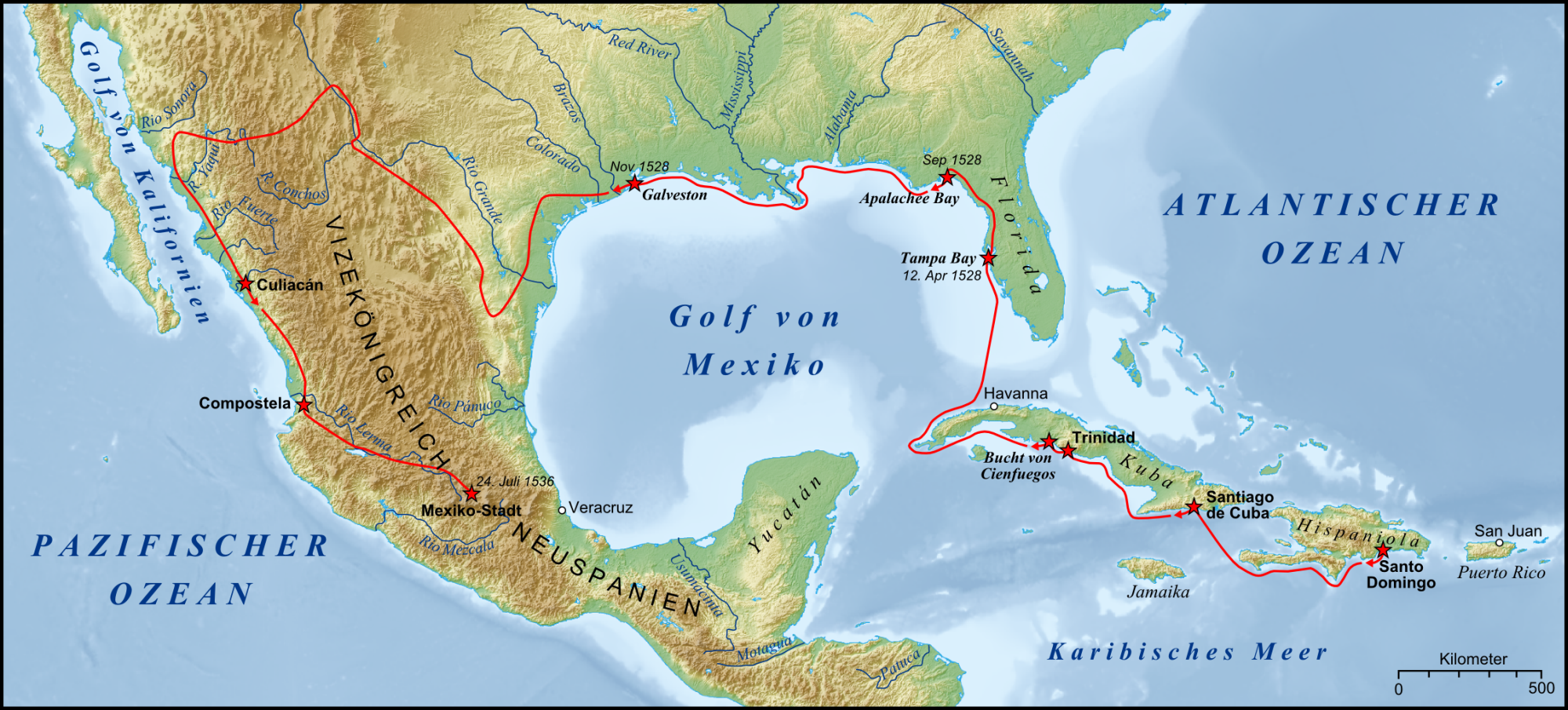
Route of Narváez expedition (until November 1528 at Galveston Island), and speculative historical reconstruction of Cabeza de Vaca's later wanderings

On 11 December 1526, Charles V commissioned Pánfilo de Narváez to explore, conquer, and settle a portion of North America called La Florida, a territory vaguely described as stretching along the Gulf coast from Mexico to Florida. Cabeza de Vaca was named treasurer by royal appointment, a position that put him second in command and made him chiefly responsible for looking after the emperor's interests during the expedition. He was promised an annual salary of 130,000 maravedies, payable upon his return. Their fleet of five vessels set sail from Spain on 17 June 1527, carrying 600 soldiers and colonists, including a few married women and enslaved Africans.

When they stopped in Hispaniola for supplies, Narváez lost more than 140 of his men, who chose to stay behind rather than continue with the expedition. They spent forty-five days on the island re-provisioning the fleet, and bought a sixth ship. They were especially anxious to acquire horses, but there was a shortage of them in Hispaniola, so the expedition continued to Cuba, where they hoped to recruit more men and buy horses. Narváez anchored at Santiago de Cuba and ordered Cabeza de Vaca to take two ships and proceed further up the coast to pick up additional provisions at Trinidad. In October, while Cabeza de Vaca was ashore negotiating for supplies, a hurricane hit the coast, resulting in the destruction of both ships and the loss of sixty men and twenty horses. Narváez arrived in early November to pick up the survivors. Fearful of encountering another storm, Narváez decided to overwinter in Cuba. The four remaining ships anchored in the Bay of Jagua under the command of Cabeza de Vaca.

While Cabeza de Vaca watched over the ships and crew, Narváez remained on shore to find replacements for the lost ships and hire more men. In February 1528, he returned to the Bay of Jagua with one additional ship and another one waiting for them in Havana. They resumed their expedition to La Florida with the intention of first stopping in Havana to pick up the final ship and more supplies. Before reaching Havana, however, they were hit by another storm and blown off course into the Gulf of Mexico. Short of supplies and fresh water, they decided to push on toward Florida rather than try to get back to Cuba. In April they sighted land, anchored and went ashore. Although the location of their landing has been much debated, more recent opinion leans toward the vicinity of Tampa Bay.

During a quick reconnaissance of the area, they came upon a few small villages of Indians belonging to the Safety Harbor culture. Communicating with them through sign language, the Spanish were informed that a community or region called Apalachee lay to the north and was rich with food and gold. Cabeza de Vaca later noted that whenever Narváez expressed interest in something, the Indians assured him it could be found in great quantities at Apalachee. As a result, Narváez was determined to lead a force north into the interior to find this rich country.

Despite strong objections from Cabeza de Vaca, Narváez decided to split his expedition. He would lead some 300 men and 42 horses overland to Apalachee while the remaining crew, including the women, would sail ahead to find a suitable harbour and await their return. Cabeza de Vaca protested that dividing their forces would put both groups in danger without any certainty that they would be able to find each other again. He advised that everyone remain with the ships until a suitable harbour could be found to serve as their base camp. Narváez ignored his advice and suggested that if Cabeza de Vaca was afraid, he should stay with the ships. Cabeza de Vaca rejected the suggestion of cowardice and participated in the overland march. He later wrote, "I preferred risking my life to placing my honour in jeopardy."

Narváez and his men set off overland in early May 1528. They marched north for 15 days without seeing any Indians or native settlements. Then, as they were attempting to cross a swift-flowing river (probably the Withlacoochee), they were confronted by a group of 200 Indians. The encounter quickly turned into a fight, and the Indians were driven off. Nearby, the Spaniards found a village where they stayed for several days and helped themselves to the stored maize. Cabeza de Vaca pleaded with Narváez to send a scouting expedition downriver in hopes of finding a bay where their ships might be waiting. Narváez relented and ordered Cabeza de Vaca to lead a reconnaissance. After two attempts to find their way through the swamps and heavy forest, their search yielded no ships or suitable harbour.

Narváez still hoped to find riches at Apalachee, so the expedition pressed forward using captive Indians as guides. Seven weeks after leaving their ships, they came upon the largest village they had found so far, a collection of forty houses. Their guides assured them this was a major Apalachee settlement, so Narváez ordered Cabeza de Vaca to lead about fifty soldiers to seize the village. There was no resistance to their attack and Cabeza de Vaca found only women and children whom he rounded up to serve as hostages. A thorough search of the houses found plenty of food but none of the hoped-for gold and gems.

Apalachee had no gold but had only corn, but the explorers were told a village known as Aute, about 5 or 9 days away, was rich. They pushed on through the swamps, harassed by the Native Americans. A few Spanish men were killed and more wounded. When they arrived in Aute, they found that the inhabitants had burned down the village and left. But the fields had not been harvested, so at least the Spanish scavenged food there. After several months of fighting native inhabitants through wilderness and swamp, the party decided to abandon the interior and try to reach Pánuco.

Slaughtering and eating their remaining horses, they gathered the stirrups, spurs, horseshoes and other metal items. They fashioned a bellows from deer hide to make a fire hot enough to forge tools and nails. They used these to make five primitive boats in hopes of reaching Mexico. The small flotilla launched on 22 September 1528, carrying the 242 survivors. Cabeza de Vaca commanded one of the vessels, each of which held approximately 50 men. Depleted of food and water, they followed the coast westward. But when they reached the mouth of the Mississippi River, the powerful current swept them out into the Gulf, where the five rafts were separated by a hurricane. Some lives were lost, including that of Narváez.

In November 1528, two crafts with about 40 survivors each, including Cabeza de Vaca, wrecked on or near Galveston Island (now part of Texas). Of the 80 or so survivors, only 15 lived past that winter. The explorers called the island Malhado ("Ill fate" in Spanish), or the Island of Doom. They tried to repair the rafts, using what remained of their own clothes as oakum to plug holes, but they lost the rafts to a large wave.

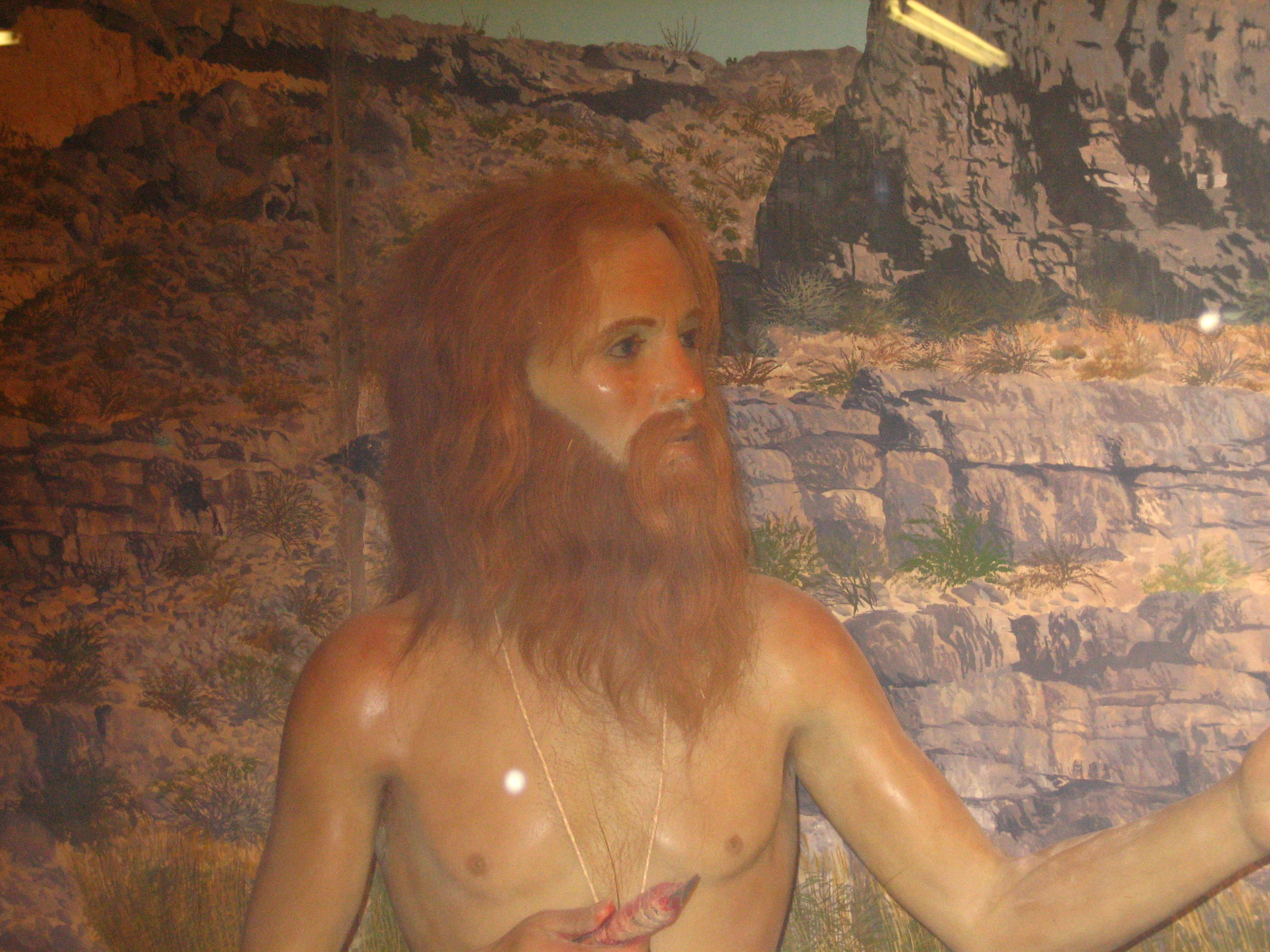
Sculpture of a thinly-clad Cabeza de Vaca on display at the Whitehead Museum in Del Rio, Texas, as he might have appeared to Indians in the lower Rio Grande area around 1536.

As the number of survivors dwindled rapidly, they were enslaved for four years by various American Indian nomadic tribes of the upper Gulf Coast. The tribes to which Cabeza de Vaca was enslaved included the Hans and the Capoques, and tribes later called the Karankawa and Coahuiltecan. Only four men managed to escape: Cabeza de Vaca, Andrés Dorantes de Carranza, Alonso del Castillo Maldonado, and an African slave of Dorantes, Estevanico.

Travelling mostly with this small group, Cabeza de Vaca walked generally south through what is now the U.S. state of Texas, as well as the northeastern Mexican states of Tamaulipas, Nuevo León and Coahuila, and possibly smaller portions of New Mexico and Arizona. He travelled on foot through areas near the Gulf Coast, but encountered no other Europeans. Turning inland because of the threat of hostile Indians, he and his companions continued through Coahuila and Nueva Vizcaya (present-day states of Chihuahua and Durango); then down the Gulf of California coast to what is now Sinaloa, Mexico, over a period of roughly eight years. Throughout those years, Cabeza de Vaca and the other men adapted to the lives of the indigenous people they stayed with, whom he later described as Roots People, the Fish and Blackberry People, or the Fig People, depending on their principal foods.

During his wanderings, passing from tribe to tribe, Cabeza de Vaca later reported that he developed sympathies for the indigenous peoples. He became a trader and a healer, which gave him some freedom to travel among the tribes. His group attracted numerous native followers, who regarded them as "children of the sun", endowed with the power to heal and destroy. As Cabeza de Vaca grew healthier, he decided that he would make his way to Pánuco, supporting himself through trading. He finally decided to try to reach the Spanish colony in Mexico. Many natives were said to accompany the explorers on their journey across what is now known as the American Southwest and northern Mexico.

After finally reaching the colonized lands of New Spain, where he first encountered fellow Spaniards near modern-day Culiacán, Cabeza de Vaca and the three other men reached Mexico City. From there he sailed back to Europe in 1537.

Numerous researchers have tried to trace his route across the Southwest. As he did not begin writing his chronicle until he was back in Spain, he had to rely on memory. He did not have instruments to determine his location; he had to rely on dead reckoning, and was uncertain of his route. Aware that his recollection has numerous errors in chronology and geography, historians have worked to put together pieces of the puzzle to discern his paths.

== Return to America ==
In 1540, Cabeza de Vaca was appointed adelantado of the Río de la Plata in South America. The colony comprised parts of what is now Argentina, Paraguay, and Uruguay. Cabeza de Vaca was assigned to find a usable route from this colony to the riches of the former Incan Empire in Peru and Bolivia now controlled by the Spanish. The heartland of the empire was in the Andes Mountains near the Pacific Coast.

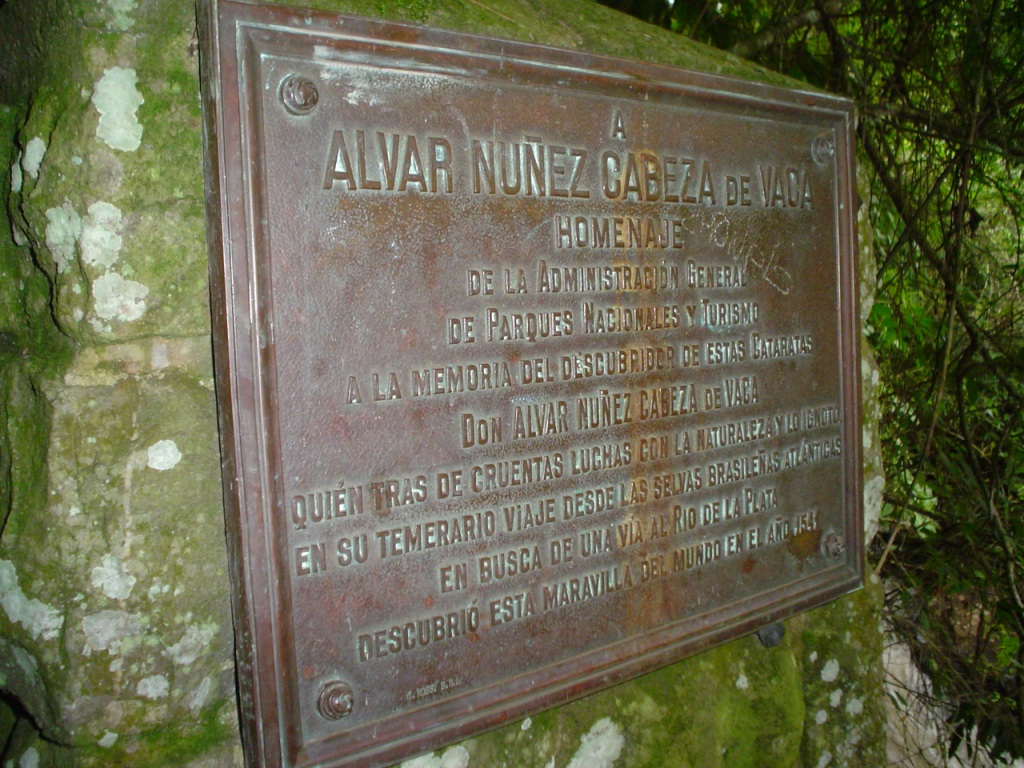
A plaque commemorating Cabeza de Vaca as the first European to see the Iguazu Falls

En route, he disembarked from his fleet at Santa Catarina Island in modern Brazil. With an indigenous force, plus 250 musketeers and 26 horses, he followed native trails discovered by Aleixo Garcia overland to the district's Spanish capital, Asunción, far inland on the great Paraguay River. Cabeza de Vaca is thought to have been the first European to see the Iguaçu Falls.

In March 1542, Cabeza de Vaca met with Domingo Martínez de Irala and relieved him of his position as governor. The government of Asunción pledged loyalty to Cabeza de Vaca, and Irala was assigned to explore a possible route to Peru. Once Irala returned and reported, Cabeza de Vaca planned his own expedition. He hoped to reach Los Reyes (a base that Irala set up) and push forward into the jungle in search of a route to the gold and silver mines of Peru. The expedition did not go well, and Cabeza de Vaca returned to Asunción.

Upon his arrival in Asunción in March 1542, Cabeza de Vaca found a colonial society in which the initial cuñadazgo—a Guaraní institution by which caciques sealed alliances by giving women to newcomers—had given way to the rancheadas: mass and violent deportations of Guaraní women who were bought and sold as commodities, used as common currency in commercial transactions, and trafficked to the Portuguese port of São Vicente on the coast of Brazil. On 5 April 1542, Cabeza de Vaca prohibited the bartering of indigenous women for metal objects, imposing penalties of economic fines, exile, or forced labor on brigantines; and on 19 March 1544, before being arrested, he issued a further decree explicitly forbidding any person from "taking" Guaraní women from their villages for service, under identical penalties. In his own account presented to the Council of the Indies in December 1545, Cabeza de Vaca also denounced that the Franciscan friars Armenta and Lebrón kept more than thirty indigenous women aged twelve to twenty enclosed in their houses "as if they were their wives." The resistance of the colonists and royal officials to these measures was one of the principal causes of his arrest in 1544. See also: Indigenous women in the conquest of Paraguay.

During Cabeza de Vaca's absence, Irala had stirred up resistance to his rule and capitalized on political rivalries. Scholars widely agree that Cabeza de Vaca had an unusually sympathetic attitude towards the Native Americans for his time. The elite settlers in modern Argentina, known as encomenderos, generally did not agree with his enlightened conduct toward the Natives; they wanted to use them for labour. Because he lost elite support, and Buenos Aires was failing as a settlement, not attracting enough residents, Martínez de Irala arrested Cabeza de Vaca in 1544 for poor administration. The former explorer was returned to Spain in 1545 for trial.

Although he was eventually exonerated, Cabeza de Vaca never returned to South America. He wrote an extensive report on the Río de la Plata colony in South America, strongly criticizing the conduct of Martínez de Irala. The report was bound with his earlier La Relación and published under the title Comentarios (Commentary). He died in Jerez de la Frontera or Valladolid on an uncertain date, although there are no surviving records of him after 19 May 1559.

== La relación de Álvar Núñez Cabeza de Vaca ==
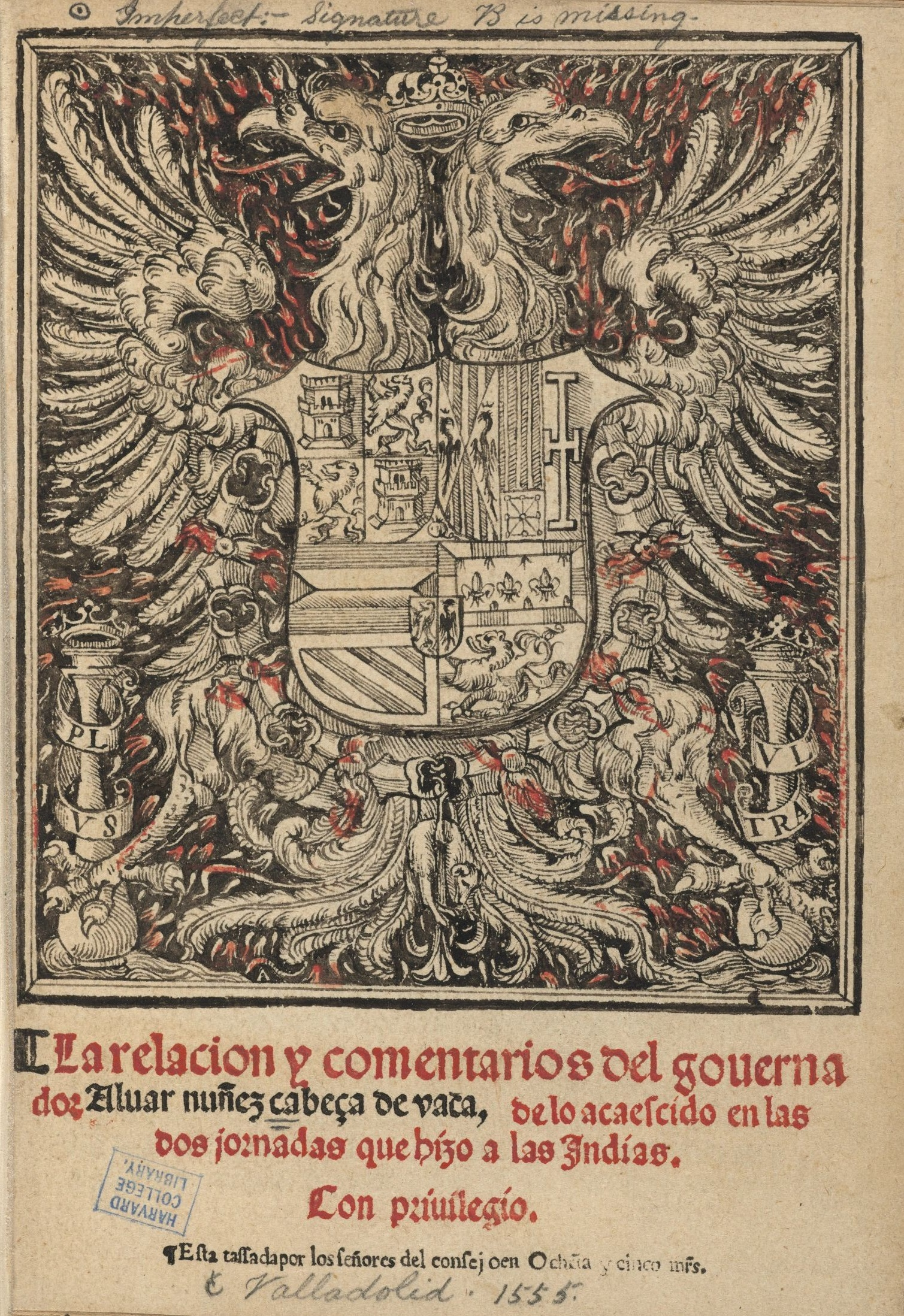
Title page from a 1555 edition of La relacion y comentarios del gobernador Aluar Núñez Cabeca de Vaca

La relación de Álvar Núñez Cabeza de Vaca ("The story of Álvar Núñez Cabeza de Vaca") is the account of his experiences with the Narváez expedition and after being wrecked on Galveston Island in November 1528. Cabeza de Vaca and his last three men struggled to survive. They wandered along the Texas coast as prisoners of the Han and Capoque American Indians for two years, while Cabeza de Vaca observed the people, picking up their ways of life and customs. They travelled through the American Southwest and ultimately reached Mexico City, nearly eight years after being wrecked on the island.

In 1537, Cabeza de Vaca returned to Spain, where he wrote his narratives of the Narváez expedition. These narratives were collected and published in 1542 in Spain. They are now known as The Relation of Álvar Núñez Cabeza de Vaca. The narrative of Cabeza de Vaca is the "first European book devoted completely to North America." His detailed account describes the lives of numerous tribes of American Indians of the time. Cabeza de Vaca showed compassion and respect for native peoples, which, together with the great detail he recorded, distinguishes his narrative from others of the period.

=== Role of observer ===
Cabeza de Vaca reported on the customs and ways of American Indian life, aware of his status as an early European explorer. He spent eight years with various peoples, including the Capoque, Han, Avavare, and Arbadao. He describes details of the culture of the Malhado people, the Capoque, and Han American Indians, such as their treatment of offspring, their wedding rites, and their main sources of food. Cabeza de Vaca and his three fellow survivors at times served as slaves to the American Indians to survive. Through his observations, Cabeza de Vaca provides insights into 16th-century American Indian life near the present-day Mexico-Texas border.

For many peoples, the accounts of Cabeza de Vaca and Hernando de Soto are the only written records of their existence. By the time of the next European contact, many had vanished, possibly from diseases carried by Cabeza de Vaca and his companions.

=== Ambassador for Christ ===
From his own telling, one of Cabeza de Vaca's greatest accomplishments in his journey was bringing peace throughout the land. As the travellers passed from one Indigenous group to the next, warring groups would immediately make peace and become friendly, so that the natives could receive the party and give them gifts. Cabeza noted in his personal account of the journey that, in this way, "We left the whole country in peace." Cabeza de Vaca saw these events as part of his purpose in America, writing that he believed that "God was guiding us to where we could serve Him."

According to Cabeza de Vaca, his greatest challenge came when he attempted to bring peace between the conquering Spanish army and the Natives. As Cabeza approached the area of Spanish settlement, he and his companions grieved to see the destruction of Indigenous villages and their inhabitants' enslavement. Cabeza claimed that, out of fear of the Spanish army, many Natives chose to hide in the forest and risk starvation, leaving fertile land uncultivated.

Cabeza de Vaca then encountered Diego de Alcaraz, commander of a slaving expedition of about 20 horsemen, and attempted to negotiate peace between them and the natives. However, as soon as they departed, Alcaraz went back on his word and plundered Cabeza de Vaca's entourage of natives that he had sent back home. Not long afterwards, Cabeza de Vaca encountered the chief alcalde (Spanish captain of the province), Melchor Díaz. Díaz ordered Cabeza de Vaca to bring the natives back from the forests so that they would resume cultivating the land. Cabeza de Vaca and Díaz invited the natives to convert to Christianity, and the natives did so willingly. Cabeza de Vaca then instructed them to build a large wooden cross in each village, so that Spanish soldiers would pass through the village and not attack it. Soon afterwards, Alcaraz's expedition returned and explained to Díaz that they were amazed to find, on their return journey, that not only was the land repopulated, but the natives came to greet them with crosses in hand and also gave them provisions. Díaz then ordered Alcaraz to do no harm to these natives.

=== Personal report ===
Cabeza de Vaca wrote this narrative to Charles V to "transmit what I saw and heard in the nine years I wandered lost and miserable over many remote lands". He wanted to convey "not merely a report of positions and distances, flora and fauna, but of the customs of the numerous indigenous people I talked with and dwelt among, as well as any other matters I could hear of or observe". He took care to present facts, as a full account of what he observed. The Relation is the only account of many details concerning the indigenous people whom he encountered. The accuracy of his account has been validated by later reports of others, as well as by the oral traditions of descendants of some of the tribes.

Cabeza's account also served as a petition to the King of Spain to both establish a permanent Christian mission and eventually establish the native tribes as a nation under the governance of Spain. In his reflection, Cabeza writes to the king of Spain:

May God in His infinite mercy grant that in the days of Your Majesty and under your power and sway, these people become willingly and sincerely subjects of the true Lord Who created and redeemed them. We believe they will be, and that Your Majesty is destined to bring it about, as it will not be at all difficult.

Cabeza continued to be a strong advocate for the rights of Native American Indians throughout his lifetime.

=== American Indian nations noted by name ===
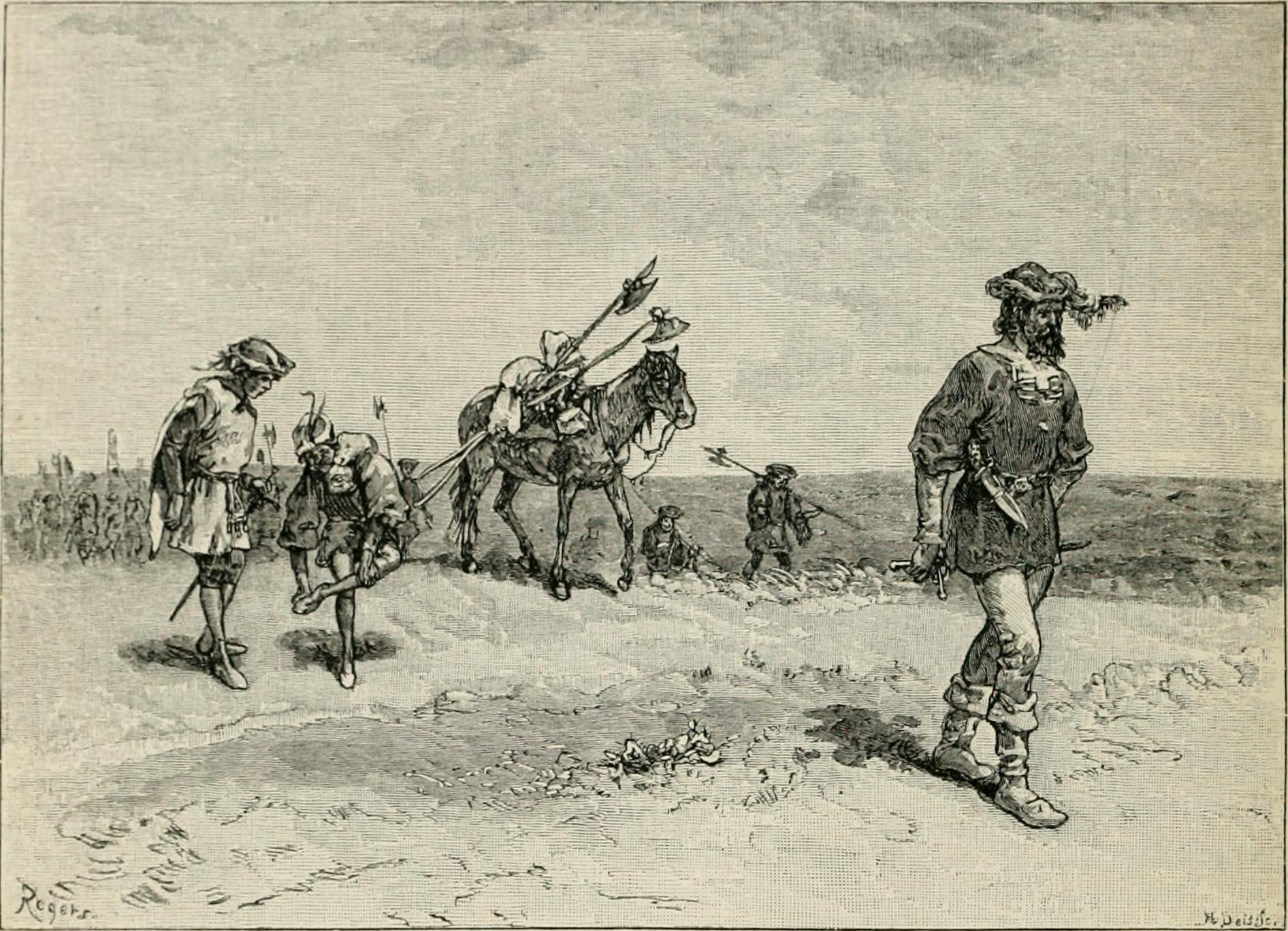
Cabeza de Vaca and companions crossing the Great American Desert. Fanciful illustration in an 1881 book.

Cabeza De Vaca identified the following peoples by name in his La Relación (1542). The following list shows his names, together with what scholars suggested in 1919 were the likely tribes identified by names used in the 20th century. By that time, tribal identification was also related to more linguistic data.

Possible Karankawan groups:

- Capoques – Cocos
- Deaguanes – Cujanes
- Quevenes – Copanes
- Guaycones – Guapites
- Camones – Karankaguases?

Related to Karankawa:

- Charruco – Bidai-Orcoquiza
- Han – Bidai-Orcoquiza

Possible Tonkawan groups:

- Mendica – Tamiques
- Mariames – Jaranames
- Iguaces – Anaquas

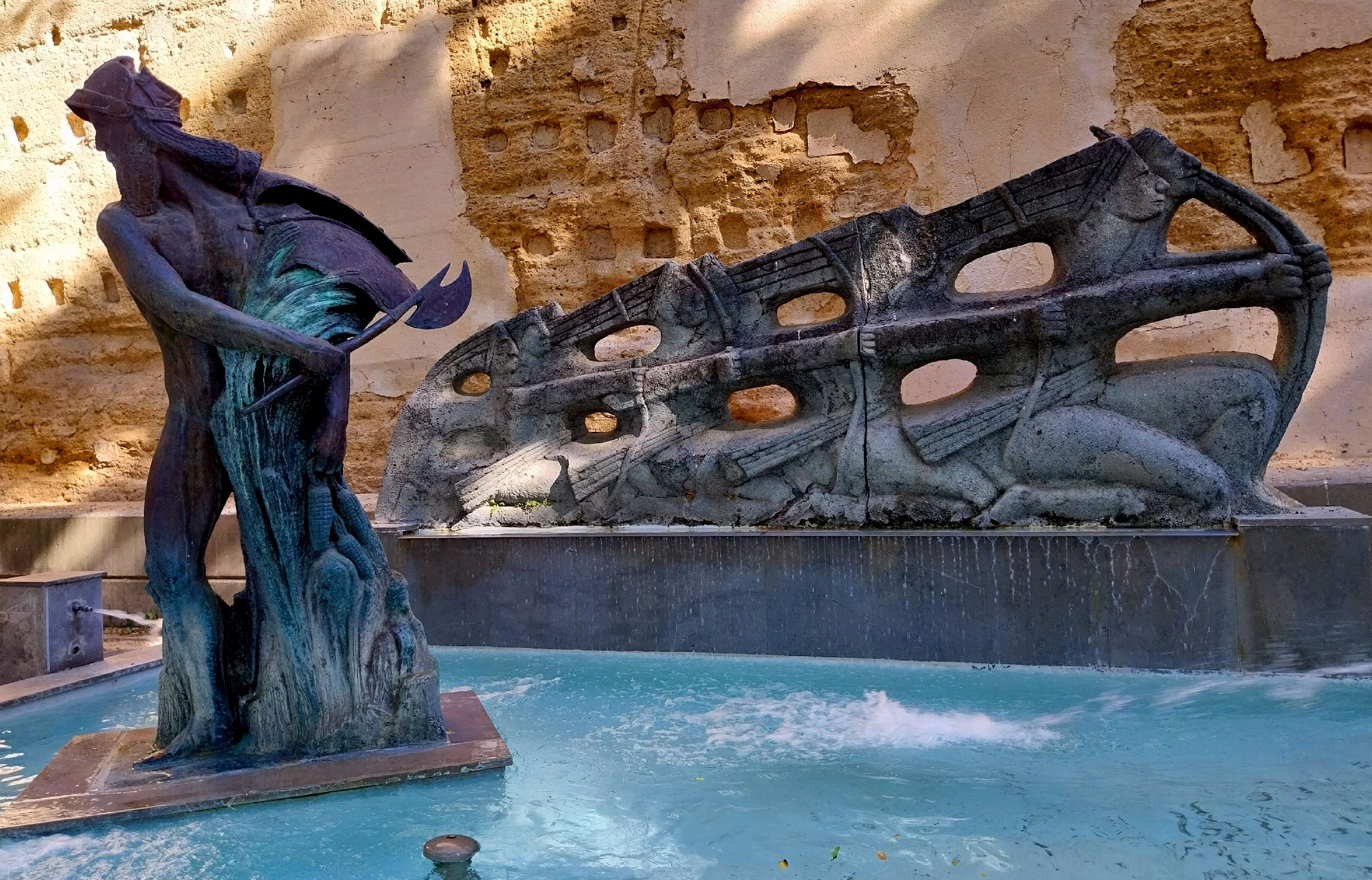
Monument to Cabeza de Vaca in Jerez de la Frontera

Possible Coahuiltecan or desert groups:

- Quitoles
- The "Fig People"
- Acubadaos
- Avavares
- Anegados
- Cutalchuches
- Maliacones
- Susolas
- Comos – Comecrudo
- Cuayos
- Arbadaos
- Atayos – Adai Caddo Indian Nation
- Cuchendados

== Comentarios ==
In 1555, after a four-year position as Adelantado in Rio de la Plata, Cabeza de Vaca wrote from memory a chronicle of his time in South America. It is believed that his secretary at the time, Pero Hernández, transcribed Cabeza de Vaca's account in what is known as Comentarios. The publication of Comentarios was appended to La relación as a joint publication in Valladolid, Spain, entitled: Naufragios. At that time, explorers often published their reports of travels in foreign lands.

=== Later editions ===
In 1906, Naufragios was published in a new edition in Madrid, Spain. The introduction says the intent of this edition was to publicize Cabeza de Vaca's observations and experiences to strengthen authentic representations. This has been described as having the objective of portraying Cabeza de Vaca as less aggressive, while trying to authenticate his role as a sympathetic observer of the natives.

== Place in Chicano literature ==
Herrera (2011) classifies Cabeza de Vaca's La Relacion as the first major contribution to Chicano literature. Scholars have identified five major periods of Chicano literature: Spanish Mexican, Mexican American, Annexation, Chicano Renaissance, and Modern. Cabeza de Vaca is classified as part of the Spanish Mexican period; he recounted eight years of travel and survival in the area of Chicano culture: present-day Texas, New Mexico, and northern Mexico. His account is the first known written description of the American Southwest.

== Film adaptation ==
- The drama feature film Cabeza de Vaca (1991), a Mexican production, was directed by Nicolás Echevarría and starred Juan Diego. Based on Naufragios, the film was entered into the 41st Berlin International Film Festival.

== Representation in other media ==
Laila Lalami's novel, The Moor's Account (2014), is a fictional memoir of Estevanico, the Moroccan slave who survived the journey and accompanied Cabeza de Vaca through the Southwest. He is considered to be the first black explorer of North America.

Lord Buckley created a monologue The Gasser based on Haniel Long's novella. This was first recorded in 1954 and again in 1959.

His story is noted in the first episode of Ken Burns' The West, a PBS documentary which first aired in 1996.

Russell Persson's The Way of Florida (Little Island Press, 2017) is a highly stylized novelization of Cabeza de Vaca's Relación.

The Great Journey of Álvar Núñez Cabeza de Vaca is a work composed between 1981 and 1988 by Colin Matthews.

He appears as a possible conquistador for the Spanish Empire in Civilization VII.

== Ancestors ==
Ancestors of Álvar Núñez Cabeza de Vaca

16. Gonzalo Yáñez de Mendoza, 8th Lord of Mendoza
8. Diego Gómez de Mendoza y Sandoval
17. Juana de Orozco, Lady of Hita and Buitrago
4. Pedro de Vera y Mendoza
18. García de Vera Aragón y Coronel, Lord of Vera and Villar de Saz
9. María García de Vera y Vargas, Lady of Vera and Villar de Saz
19. Aldonza de Vargas
2. Francisco de Vera Mendoza y Hinojosa
20.
10.
21.
5. Beatriz Pérez de Hinojosa
22.
11.
23.
1. Álvar Núñez Cabeza de Vaca
24. Álvar Núñez Cabeza de Vaca
12. Fernán Ruiz Cabeza de Vaca
25. Teresa Vázquez de Meira
6. Pedro Fernández Cabeza de Vaca
26. Diego González de Avellaneda
13. Beatriz González de Medina
27.
3. María Teresa Cabeza de Vaca y Zurita
28. Francisco Alfonso de Zurita
14. Diego Fernández de Zurita y Tolosantos
29. Juana García de Tolosantos y López
7. María Catalina de Zurita Suárez y Figueroa Moscoso
30. Ruy Barba de Moscoso y Suárez de Figueroa
15. María Mencía Suárez de Figueroa y Moscoso Quiñones
31. Elvira de Quiñones

== Bibliography ==
=== English editions ===
- Cabeza de Vaca, Álvar Núñez. The Journey of Álvar Núñez Cabeza de Vaca and his companions from Florida to the Pacific 1528-1536. Translation of La Relacion, ed. Ad. F. Bandelier. New York, Allerton Book Co. 1904.
- Cabeza de Vaca, Álvar Núñez. The Narrative of Cabeza De Vaca, Translation of La Relacion, ed. Rolena Adorno and Patrick Charles Pautz. Lincoln, NE: University of Nebraska Press, 2003. ISBN 0-8032-6416-X (one of many editions)
- Cabeza de Vaca, Álvar Núñez. Cabeza de Vaca's Adventures in the Unknown Interior of America, Translation of La Relación by Cyclone Covey. Santa Fe, NM: University of New Mexico Press, 1983. ISBN 0-8263-0656-X
- The Account: Álvar Núñez Cabeza de Vaca's Relacíon. Translated by Martin Favata and Jose Fernández. Houston: Arte Público Press. February 1993 [1542]. ISBN 978-1558850606.
- Cabeza de Vaca, Álvar Núñez. Chronicle of the Narváez Expedition, Translation of La Relacion, translated by David Frye, edited by Ilan Stavans. Norton Critical Edition, 2013. ISBN 978-0393918151
- Cabeza de Vaca, Álvar Núñez. The Commentaries of Alvar Nunez Cabeza De Vaca., The Conquest of the River Plate, part II. London: Hakluyt, 1891 (first English edition).

== See also ==
- Choctaw
- Campeiro
- Criollo
- Mississippian culture
- Pinus remota
- Quivira and Cíbola
- Francisco Vásquez de Coronado, another Spanish explorer in North America
- Bust of Álvar Núñez Cabeza de Vaca, Houston, Texas

== Bibliography ==
- Adorno, Rolena and Pautz, Patrick Charles. Alvar Nunez Cabeza De Vaca: His Account, His Life and the Expedition of Panfilo De Narvaez, 3 volumes, in English; University of Nebraska Press, Lincoln, London (1999); hardcover; ISBN 978-0803214637
- Campbell, T. (1981). "Historic Indian Groups of the Choke Canyon Reservoir and Surrounding Area, Southern Texas". Index of Texas Archaeology: Open Access Gray Literature from the Lone Star State. 1981 (1) 24. doi:10.21112/ita.1981.1.24. ISSN 2475-9333.
- Chipman, Donald E. (1987). "In Search of Cabeza de Vaca's Route across Texas: An Historiographical Survey". The Southwestern Historical Quarterly. 91 (2): 127–148. ISSN 0038-478X. JSTOR 30240015.
- Chipman, Donald E. (2010). "Cabeza de Vaca, Álvar Núñez". TSHA Handbook of Texas Online. Texas State Historical Association.
- Chipman, Donald E.; Weddle, Robert S. (2013). "How Historical Myths Are Born...... And Why They Seldom Die". The Southwestern Historical Quarterly. 116 (3): 227–258. ISSN 0038-478X. JSTOR 24388345.
- Hoffman, Paul E. (1994). "Narvaez and Cabeza de Vaca in Florida". In Hudson, Charles; Tesser, Carmen Chavez (eds.). The Forgotten Centuries, Indians and Europeans in the American South, 1521-1704. Athens & London: University of Georgia Press. pp. 50–73. ISBN 9780820316543.
- Howard, David A. (1996). Conquistador in Chains: Cabeza de Vaca and the Indians of the Americas. Tuscaloosa: University of Alabama Press. ISBN 978-0817308285.
- Krieger, Alex D. We Came Naked and Barefoot: The Journey of Cabeza de Vaca across North America. Austin: University of Texas Press, 2002. ISBN 978-0-292-74235-2.
- Long, Haniel. Interlinear to Cabeza de Vaca (1936), a fictionalized account of Cabeza de Vaca's journey
- Reséndez, Andrés. A Land So Strange: The Epic Journey of Cabeza de Vaca, Basic Books, Perseus, 2007. ISBN 0-465-06840-5
- Schneider, Paul. Brutal Journey, Cabeza de Vaca and the Epic First Crossing of North America, New York: Henry Holt, 2007. ISBN 0-8050-8320-0
- Udall, Stewart L. Majestic Journey: Coronado's Inland Empire, Museum of New Mexico Press, 1995. ISBN 0-89013-285-2
- Varnum, Robin (2014). Álvar Núñez Cabeza de Vaca: American Trailblazer. Norman, OK: University of Oklahoma Press.
- Wild, Peter (1991). Álvar Núñez Cabeza de Vaca. Boise, ID: Boise State University, 1991. ISBN 978-0884301004 OCLC 24515951, 656314379 (print and on-line)

=== Spanish ===
- Adorno, Rolena and Pautz, Patrick Charles; Alvaro Núñez Cabeza de Vaca: sus logros, su vida y la expedición de Pánfilo de Narváez, 3 volumes, in Spanish; University of Nebraska Press, Lincoln, London (15 September 1999); hardcover; 1317 pages; ISBN 978-0803214545
- Caba, Rubén; Gómez-Lucena, Eloísa (2008). La odisea de Cabeza de Vaca: Tras los pasos de Álvar Núñez por tierras americanas [The Odyssey of Cabeza de Vaca: on the footsteps of Álvar Núñez on American lands (historical essay)]. Terra Incógnita (in Spanish). Barcelona: Edhasa. ISBN 9788435039864.
- Caba, Rubén; Gómez-Lucena, Eloísa (October 2008). "Cabeza de Vaca: El Ulises del Nuevo Mundo" [Cabeza de Vaca: the Ulysses of the New World]. Clío Historia (in Spanish) (84): 72–79. ISSN 1579-3532.
- Jauregui, Carlos (2014). "Cabeza de Vaca, Mala Cosa y las vicisitudes de la extrañeza". Revista de Estudios Hispánicos (in Spanish). 48 (3): 421–447. doi:10.1353/rvs.2014.0059.
- Maura, Juan Francisco, ed. (July 2007). "Carta de Luis Ramírez a su padre desde el Brasil (1528)" (PDF). Lemir. Parnaseo (in Spanish). University of Valencia: 63. ISSN 1579-735X.
- Maura, Juan Francisco (July 2011). "Alvar Núñez Cabeza de Vaca: el gran burlador de América, Second Edition corrected and augmented" (PDF). Lemir. Parnaseo (in Spanish). University of Valencia. ISSN 1579-735X.
- Maura, Juan Francisco (October 2008). "Alvar Núñez Cabeza de Vaca: el gran burlador de América" (PDF). Lemir. Parnaseo (in Spanish). University of Valencia. ISSN 1579-735X.
- Maura, Juan Francisco. (October 2013)."El libro 50 de la Historia General y Natural de las Indias («Infortunios y Naufragios») de Gonzalo Fernández de Oviedo (1535): ¿génesis e inspiración de algunos episodios de Naufragios de Alvar Núñez Cabeza de Vaca (1542)?" Lemir 17, 87-100. University of Valencia

=== Italian ===
- Giovan Battista Ramusio: Delle navigationi et viaggi Terzo volume , pp. 310–330 – "Relatione che fece Alvaro Nunez detto Capo di vacca" – Venetia, 1565 (1606 edition)

Preceded by Domingo Martínez de Irala	Governor of New Andalusia; 1540–1544	Succeeded by Domingo Martínez de Irala
