= Fisher Heights =

- Neighbourhood
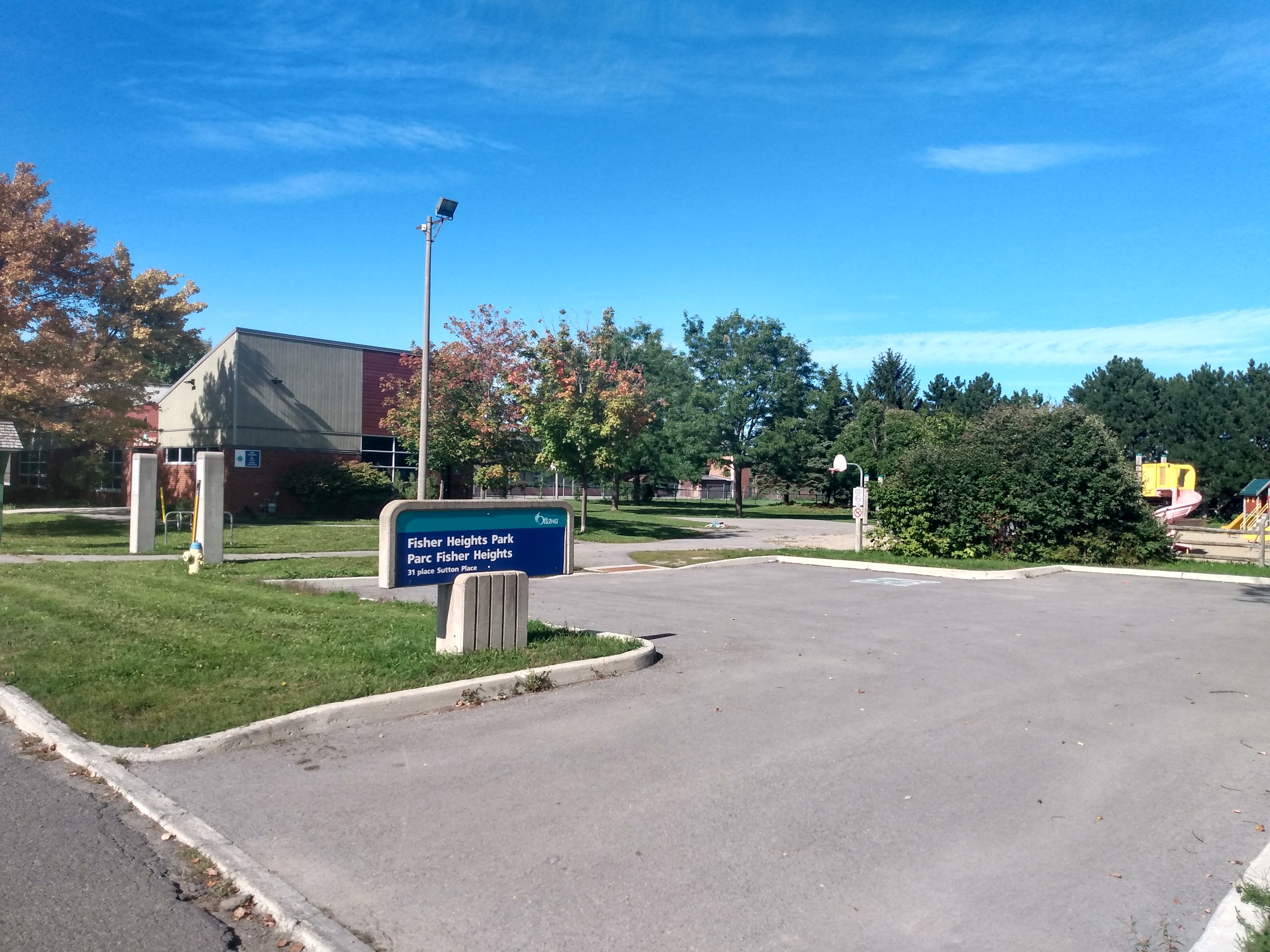
- Fisher Heights Park

- Location within Ottawa
- Coordinates: 45°21′55″N 75°43′10″W
- Country: Canada
- Province: Ontario
- City: Ottawa

Government
  - MPs: Anita Vandenbeld
  - MPPs: Chandra Pasma
  - Councillors: Sean Devine
  - Governing body: Fisher Heights & Area Community Association
  - President: Joel Laforest

Area
  - Total: 1.926 km^{2} (0.744 sq mi)
- Elevation: 90 m (300 ft)

Population (Canada 2016 Census)
  - Total: 6,408
  - Density: 3,327/km^{2} (8,617/sq mi)
- Time zone: Eastern (EST)
- Forward sortation area: K2E
- Website: Community Association

Fisher Heights is a neighbourhood located in the far northeast corner of the former City of Nepean in Ottawa, Ontario, Canada. It is located in Knoxdale-Merivale Ward. The area is located south of the Experimental Farm and approximately 8 km away from downtown Ottawa.

According to the Community Association, the boundaries of the neighbourhood are Baseline Road on the north, Fisher Avenue on the east, Meadowlands Drive on the south and Merivale Road on the west. This area also covers the neighbourhood of Skyline, Orchard Park and Parkwood Hills North. The population for this area was 6,408 according to the 2016 Canada Census.

== History ==
Prior to the area being developed as a subdivision, the corner of Merivale (originally the Merivale Stone Road) and Baseline (Base Line) marked the site of the village of City View. City View exists as a neighbourhood to this day, but is located west of Merivale. The Fisher Heights subdivision itself was first developed in the 1950s, with the area continuing to be developed into the 1970s. When it existed as a police village, the boundaries of City View extended east of Merivale, and north of Capilano Drive.

== Features ==
Fisher Heights is home to the Ottawa Islamic School. The school was formerly Fisher Heights Public School which ran from 1954 until 1988. Zena's Fisher Heights Plaza is a strip mall at the intersection of Fisher Avenue and Baseline Road. Villa Marconi is a long-term care facility and non-profit, charitable organization. Open spaces in the area include Fisher Heights Park and Steve MacLean/Long Park. A volunteer-run community association operates in the neighbourhood as the Fisher Heights & Area Community Association (FHACA).

The Nepean Trail in Fisher Heights runs from the intersection north of Grant Carman Drive through the west side of Fisher Heights to Baseline at the top end of Farlane Ave.
