= Martín Alhaja =

13th-century Spanish shepherd

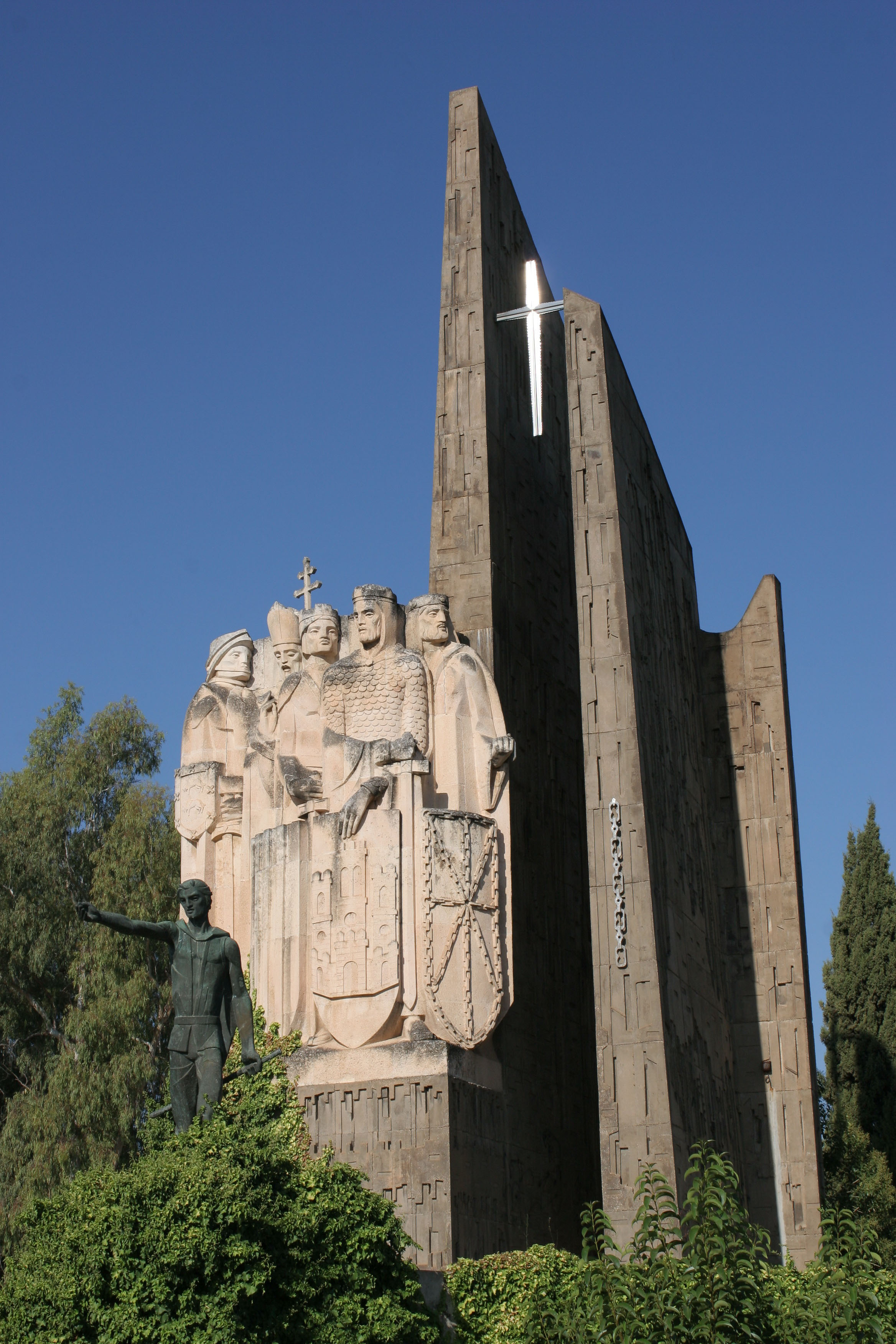
Monument at Las Navas de Tolosa in Spain remembering Battle of same name in La Carolina (province of Jaén, Spain)

Martín Alhaja was a Spanish shepherd who aided the Castilian King Alfonso VIII during the Battle of Las Navas de Tolosa in 1212 A.D. Alhaja, who knew the area, to herd his sheep had placed a cow skull on the path that led to the field behind the Moors and onto the battlefield. The Spanish Christian King surprised the Moorish army and defeated them.

For his assistance, King Alfonso VIII gave Alhaja the title "Cabeza de Vaca", which means "head of a cow". He was awarded a coat-of-arms that included cow skulls in its design. He is the maternal ancestor of explorer Álvar Núñez Cabeza de Vaca.

== See also ==
- Ephialtes of Trachis, who had a similar role in the Battle of Thermopylae.
