= Caba =

Caba is a Spanish and Catalan surname. Notable people with surname include:

- Antoni Caba (1838–1907), Spanish painter
- Eduardo Caba (1890–1953), Bolivian composer and pianist
- Emilio Gutiérrez Caba (born 1942), Spanish film actor
- Irene Caba Alba (1899–1957), Argentine-Spanish film actress
- Julia Caba Alba (1912–1988), Spanish actress
- Julia Gutiérrez Caba (born 1928), Spanish theatre actress
- Mick Caba (born 1950), American association football manager
- Rubén Caba (born 1935), Spanish novelist and essayist
