= Eloísa Gómez-Lucena =

Spanish contemporary writer

Eloísa Gómez-Lucena is a Spanish contemporary writer.

Gómez-Lucena earned a degree in philosophy, with a specialty in Anthropology at the Universidad Autónoma de Madrid and graduated in library science and archival science at the CEBD (Ministerio de Cultura de España). She makes a living as a librarian and author.

== Bibliography ==
- Del Atlántico al Pacífico: Tras los pasos de Cabeza de Vaca por Estados Unidos y México [Travel]. Córdoba: Editorial Almuzara (Colección Sotavento), 2018. ISBN 978-84-17229-75-7.
- Naufragios, de Álvar Núñez Cabeza de Vaca. Col. Letras Hispánicas. Edición crítica de Eloísa Gómez-Lucena y Rubén Caba. Madrid: Cátedra, 2018. ISBN 978-84-376-3922-2
- Españolas del Nuevo Mundo: Ensayos biográficos, siglo XVI-XVII. Madrid: Cátedra, 2013. Biographies of Spanish women in America. ISBN 978-84-376-3202-5.
- La odisea de Cabeza de Vaca (co-author). Barcelona y Buenos Aires: Edhasa, 2008 [www.edhasa.es]. This historical essay clarifies the text of Shipwrecks, as well as establishing the route taken by Álvar Núñez Cabeza de Vaca and his three companions. The authors followed the complete route from Tampa, Florida to Culiacán, Mexico, near the Pacific coast, in the summer of 2004. ISBN 978-84-350-3986-4.
- El zoo urbano. Sevilla: Espuela de Plata (Editorial Renacimiento), 2008 [www.editorialrenacimiento.com]. Novel about terrorism intrigue and also a story of love in Madrid downtown. ISBN 978-84-96956-21-6.
- Cabeza de Vaca. El Ulises del Nuevo Mundo (co-author). Barcelona: Review of History "Clío", nº 84, October 2008, pp. 72–79. ISSN 1579-3532.
- La odisea de Cabeza de Vaca (co-author). Review "La Aventura de la Historia", nº 84, October 2005, pp. 96–101. Includes a clear description of the route of Cabeza de Vaca in 16th century and a map.
- Expedición al Paraíso. Sevilla: Espuela de Plata (Ed. Renacimiento), 2004 [www.editorialrenacimiento.com]. Historical novel about women of the 16th century traveling from Sevilla to Asunción de Paraguay (1550–1556). ISBN 84-96133-10-9.
- Investigación y reconstrucción histórica del viaje de Álvar Núñez Cabeza de Vaca por los actuales Estados Unidos y México (2004). Ministerio de Cultura. Research projects and Study about the travel of Cabeza de Vaca around the United States and Mexico.

== Congress and symposiums ==
- Conferences, talks and papers about Spanish conquers and women scouts-explorers in Españolas del Nuevo Mundo, ensayos biográficos XVI-XVII: Sociedad Geográfica Española (SGE), Casa de Cultura Ignacio Aldecoa (Vitoria), Feria del Libro Extremeño en Almendralejo, Aula Hoy (Cáceres y Badajoz), Jornada de Extremeños en América (Trujillo), etc. 2013–2018.
- Interviews and literary debate about Españolas del Nuevo Mundo, en RNE-1, RNE-5, Cadena Ser, Onda Cero, etc. 2013–2018.
- Españolas de armas tomar en la América del XVI. Lecture in the summer's course "Las claves de un renacimiento femenino: en busca de la 'Ciudad de las damas'. UNED: Guadalajara, 14–18 July 2008.
- La adelantada doña Mencía Calderón y la expedición Sanabria. Lecture at "XVI Semana Cultural de la Hispanidad". Medellín, 11–17 October 2004.
- Las ilusiones de la lectura. Lecture in the Palacio de Minería de la Ciudad de México at the Universidad Nacional Autónoma de México and the Universidad del Claustro Sor Juana Inés de la Cruz, Ciudad de México, March 1998.
