= Continental Automated Buildings Association =

International non-profit industry organization

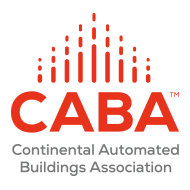
- Founded: 1988
- Type: Industry Association
- Purpose: home and building automation technologies
- Region served: North America
- Method: market research, member networking
- Website: http://www.caba.org

The Continental Automated Buildings Association (CABA) is an international, not-for-profit, industry organization that promotes intelligent home and intelligent building technologies.

The organization is supported by an international membership of 380 organizations and over 27,000 industry professionals involved in the design, manufacture, installation and retailing of products relating to home automation and building automation. Public organizations, including utilities and government are also members.

The organization was founded in 1988 as the Canadian Automated Buildings Association. The founding members included Bell Canada, Bell-Northern Research, Ontario Hydro, Hydro-Québec, Consumers Gas, Canadian Home Builders' Association, the Electrical and Electronic Manufacturers Association of Canada, Industry Canada, Minto Developments Inc. and the National Research Council of Canada.

In 2006, CABA acquired the Internet Home Alliance, an association of technology companies committed to research and development within the intelligent home sector. In 2010, CABA's collaborative research evolved and expanded into the CABA Research Program, which is directed by the CABA Board of Directors. The CABA Research Program's scope now includes market research for both large building technologies and home systems.
