= Parkwood Hills =

- Neighbourhood
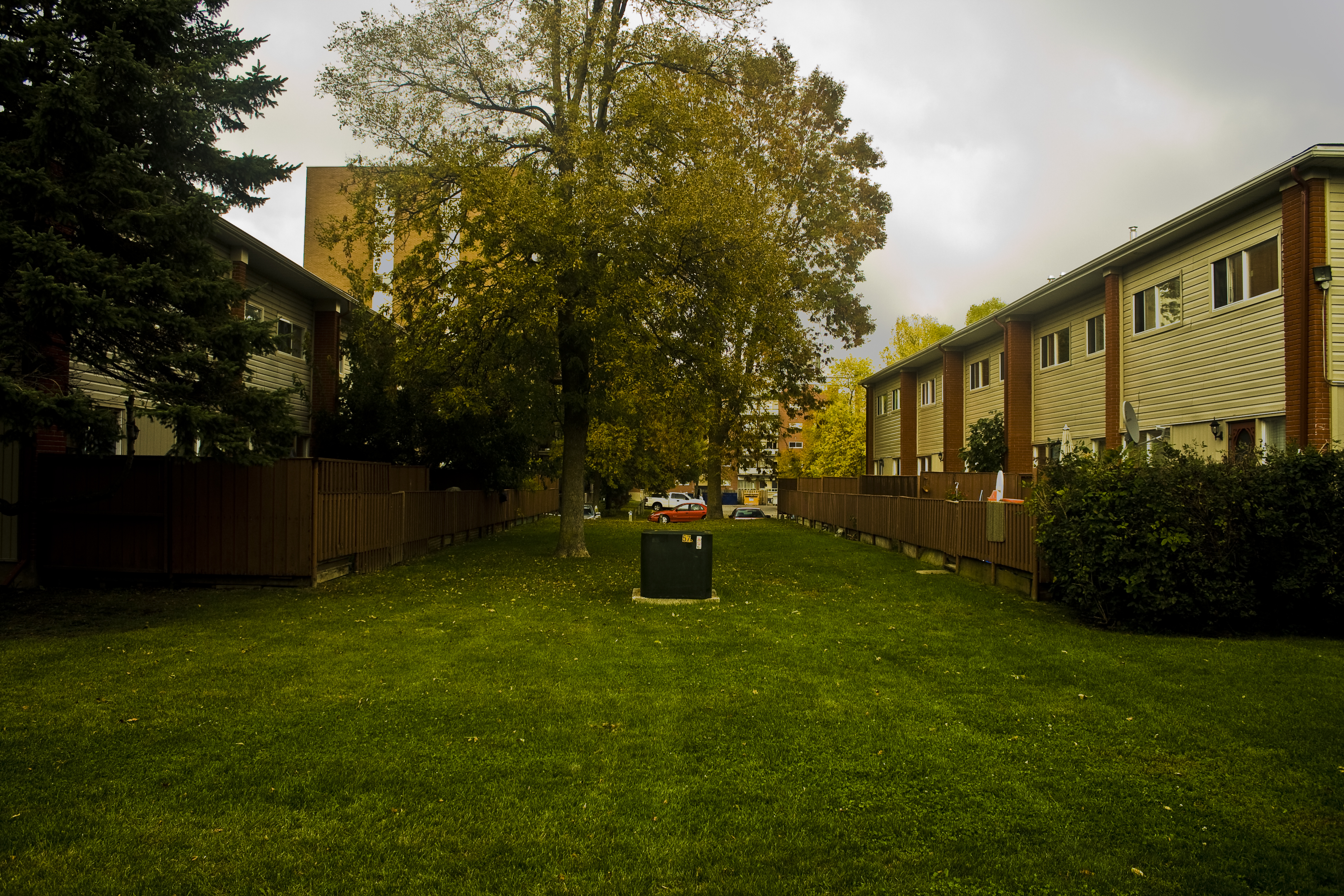
- Townhouses on Meadowlands Drive.

- Location within Ottawa
- Coordinates: 45°21′30″N 75°43′23″W
- Developed: 1959

Government
  - MPs: Anita Vandenbeld
  - MPPs: Chandra Pasma
  - Councillors: Sean Devine
  - Governing body: General Burns Community Association
  - President: Alexandra Kealey-Morin
- Elevation: 90 m (300 ft)
- Time zone: UTC-5 (Eastern (EST))
  - Summer (DST): UTC-4 (EDT)
- Forward sortation area: K2E

Parkwood Hills is a neighbourhood in Knoxdale-Merivale Ward in the west end of Ottawa, Canada. Prior to amalgamation in 2001, it was located in the City of Nepean. It is notable for the thriller Parkwood Hills (2002) which was filmed on location in the area by Kolin Casagrande, and for being a typical and illustrative example of town planning and development by Minto in the context of its position as the property manager for the National Capital Commission.

== Location ==
Central to this development is Meadowlands Drive to the north (some of the neighbourhood goes past north of Meadowlands to Baseline Road), bounded to the east by Fisher Avenue and to the west by Merivale Road. Image. It is in Knoxdale-Merivale Ward which was expanded in 2006. The councillor for Knoxdale-Merivale is Sean Devine, replacing the previous incumbent, Keith Egli, who retired prior to the 2022 Municipal Election. The neighbourhood is part of the General Burns Community Association, along with Stewart Farm, Borden Farm, Fisher Glen, CitiPlace and part of Carleton Heights. North of Meadowlands, the area is part of the Fisher Heights & Area Community Association.

== History of the area ==
=== Before 1959 ===
It is known that at least some of this land was farmland, since the Mulvagh farmhouse was here. The farmhouse was later taken over by the Parkwood Presbyterian Church. Farming was challenging in some respects, due to the Depression, animal predation and fire risk.

=== Development from 1959 ===
Parkwood Hills is the name given to a residential development to the east of the section of Ottawa known as Nepean. One possible source for the name is Parkwood Hill, the fictional suburban setting for the 1948-1969 UK radio series Mrs Dale's Diary.

It is a mixed-dwelling suburb, having apartment blocks, townhouses and an assortment of single-family houses. The development is largely the work of the building company, Minto, which maintains ownership of many of the multi-residence buildings. The tract has been developed over the past half-century and is largely complete. The development was planned by architect John Russell in 1959. He was influenced by Californian community layouts and house models, but see Ottawa urban planning. The building took place between 1959 and 1972. In 1967 Minto built the first high-rise condominium development in Canada, called Horizon House, and located on Meadowlands Drive at Chesterton.

Suburban development flourished in the 1950s and '60s, with Ottawa companies, including Minto and Campeau Corporation building slews of suburban singles in Elmvale Acres, Parkwood Hills and similar areas, many of them in the 1,200-square-foot range.

=== Movie ===
The movie Parkwood Hills was made on location here in 2002 by Kolin Casagrande, who later produced The Walkers in 2004. It is a "short horror film, made as part of a project that assigned filmmakers to make short films with a horror theme," and was shown as part of a Halloween entertainment in Ottawa in 2007. Since the plot centres on the fears of a babysitter, it possibly falls into the horror-of-personality subgenre.

== For children ==
=== Schools ===
Public schools in Nepean are administered by Ottawa-Carleton District School Board (Parkwood Hills, Century, Sir Winston Churchill, and Merivale High School) . Catholic schools are administered by the Ottawa-Carleton Catholic School Board(Frank Ryan and St. Rita). Amalgamation of some schools has been recently recommended, due to a fall in student numbers. Parkwood Hills Public School closed in 2010 after a low decline in students. Students afterwards went to Sir Winston Churchill.

Des Laurier High School has an active basketball team which played a friendly against the local police in May 2009. Parkwood Hills Public School won a Health Pennant from the Ministry of Health on 4 May 2007, and took part in the Who is Nobody program in 2009.

=== Childcare ===
Huron Towers Preschool/Kindergarten Child Care Centre caters for 44 children. In 2010 the Child Care Center moved to a new, environmentally friendly building where it will cater for 47 children on Capilano Drive and Beaver Ridge. St. Luke's Child Care Center also caters for 47 children. This center operates various childcare programs and outside visits.

=== Recreational ===
115th Parkwood Hills Scouts meets weekly from fall through spring, and holds meetings for Beavers, Cubs and Sea Scouts.

== Churches ==
Parkwood Presbyterian Church on Chesterton drive was built in 1974, but its first service was held in Parkwood Hills Public School in 1964. Due to expansion in attendance, a congregation was formed in 1965, and the Mulvagh farmhouse - at the corner of Meadowlands and Chesterton - became the manse, with the congregation's first full-time minister. Between 1965 and 2021 there have been five resident ministers.

Due to further growth of the congregation, an expansion fund was set up in the early 1980s. The old manse was renovated to become the Fellowship Centre in 1989, with a wheelchair ramp added in 1990. In 1996 the church building was expanded, and the congregation was involved in various missions in 1996 and 1998.

This is a church-going community which is surrounded by other neighbourhoods, so that the only church in Parkwood Hills does not have a monopoly on the local faithful. Other nearby churches include United, Anglican, Brethren, Christian Reformed, Lutheran, Pentecostal, Roman Catholic and United, all within a few km of Parkwood Hills.

== Amenities ==
This community includes parks, playgrounds, tennis courts and retail areas. A neighbourhood bonfire takes place at Halloween.

=== Parks and sport ===
Parkwood Hills Recreation Centre is in Meadowland Mall, on Merivale Road.

General Burns park, named after E. L. M. Burns, contains an outdoor public swimming pool, 4 tennis courts, baseball field, soccer field and a children's play area. The General Burns Community Centre is in a 1950s log cabin, and offers recreational and community programs, which include pilates, taekwondo, 117th Company Pathfinders, 115th Parkwood Hills Scout group, Duffer Doo and Parkwood Hills Softball Association. In winter from mid-December the park operates an outdoor ice hockey rink and children's ice pad.

Parkwood Hills Softball Association operates youth and adult softball leagues, and holds charity tournaments. They award various trophies: the Neil Cohen Memorial Trophy, the Ron Potvin Memorial Trophy and the Junior Umpire Achievement Award.

Raoul Wallenberg park is named after the humanitarian Raoul Wallenberg.

=== Allotments and gardening ===
The Nepean Allotment Gardens on Viewmount comprise 200 plots.

== Public transit ==
This is run by OC Transpo on the OC Transpo routes, and discussed at the Public Transit in Ottawa site. Buses run mainly on Meadowlands Drive, consisting of the regular routes, 86 and 111, and the commuter route, 57. Image.

== Climate ==
The weather for Parkwood Hills is included in the Nepean weather forecast here. Canada climate data is here. Mini snowploughs are a not-uncommon sight. Image.

Climate data for Nepean - Barrhaven
Month	Jan	Feb	Mar	Apr	May	Jun	Jul	Aug	Sep	Oct	Nov	Dec	Year
Record high °C (°F)	14 (57)	15.4 (59.7)	26.7 (80.1)	33.1 (91.6)	35.8 (96.4)	38.1 (100.6)	44.7 (112.5)	48.8 (119.8)	35 (95)	27.8 (82.0)	23.9 (75.0)	16.3 (61.3)	39.8 (103.6)
Mean daily maximum °C (°F)	−5.1 (22.8)	−4.1 (24.6)	3.2 (37.8)	11.8 (53.2)	20.1 (68.2)	25.8 (78.4)	28.5 (83.3)	26.9 (80.4)	20.5 (68.9)	15.5 (59.9)	5.8 (42.4)	−3 (27)	11.9 (53.4)
Mean daily minimum °C (°F)	−13.3 (8.1)	−12.3 (9.9)	−5.1 (22.8)	2.6 (36.7)	10.7 (51.3)	14.7 (58.5)	17.4 (63.3)	15.1 (59.2)	10.1 (50.2)	4 (39)	−1.8 (28.8)	−10.1 (13.8)	2.1 (35.8)
Record low °C (°F)	−35.6 (−32.1)	−36.1 (−33.0)	−30.6 (−23.1)	−16.7 (1.9)	−5.6 (21.9)	−0.1 (31.8)	5 (41)	2.6 (36.7)	−3 (27)	−7.8 (18.0)	−21.7 (−7.1)	−34.4 (−29.9)	−36.1 (−33.0)
Average precipitation mm (inches)	25.2 (0.99)	17.6 (0.69)	36.3 (1.43)	60.5 (2.38)	78.4 (3.09)	85 (3.3)	90.6 (3.57)	87.1 (3.43)	85.3 (3.36)	74.9 (2.95)	59.8 (2.35)	31.3 (1.23)	732 (28.8)
Average snowfall cm (inches)	50.2 (19.8)	45 (18)	30.8 (12.1)	10 (3.9)	0 (0)	0 (0)	0 (0)	0 (0)	0 (0)	0.1 (0.0)	21.9 (8.6)	57.2 (22.5)	175.7 (69.2)

== Flora and fauna ==
=== Native plants ===
This area is included in Ottawa's efforts to reinstate some of the native flora and wildlife habitat which has been displaced due to development. Domestic gardeners are encouraged to plant native species such as Solomon's seal and bloodroot, although many of them are already doing their bit to discourage invasive alien species (also described as non-indigenous, non-native, invasive and exotic) such as dandelion, Queen Anne's lace, buckthorn, garlic mustard and emerald ash borer.

=== Birds ===
Like many similar suburban neighbourhoods in this zone, Parkwood Hills is rich in gardens, shaded by mature trees and beautified with a wide variety of shrubs. This has created a habitat favoured by many species of birds, particularly those less nervous of living in close proximity with humans. In consequence, backyard birdwatching can be most rewarding for the suburban enthusiast. Birds to be found regularly in the area are grackles, cardinals, hummingbirds and chickadees. Image. Recently the Townsend's solitaire was found and photographed in Parkwood Hills by F. Ouellette-Streeting.

=== Wildlife ===
Common animals are eastern grey squirrels and skunks. There are two ways in which wildlife might be viewed here: as a control issue and as a recreational issue with conservation and education in mind. Deer can wander onto roads and into suburbs, so there is an annual Speeding Costs You...Deerly campaign for safe driving.
