= Rubén Caba =

Spanish novelist and essayist

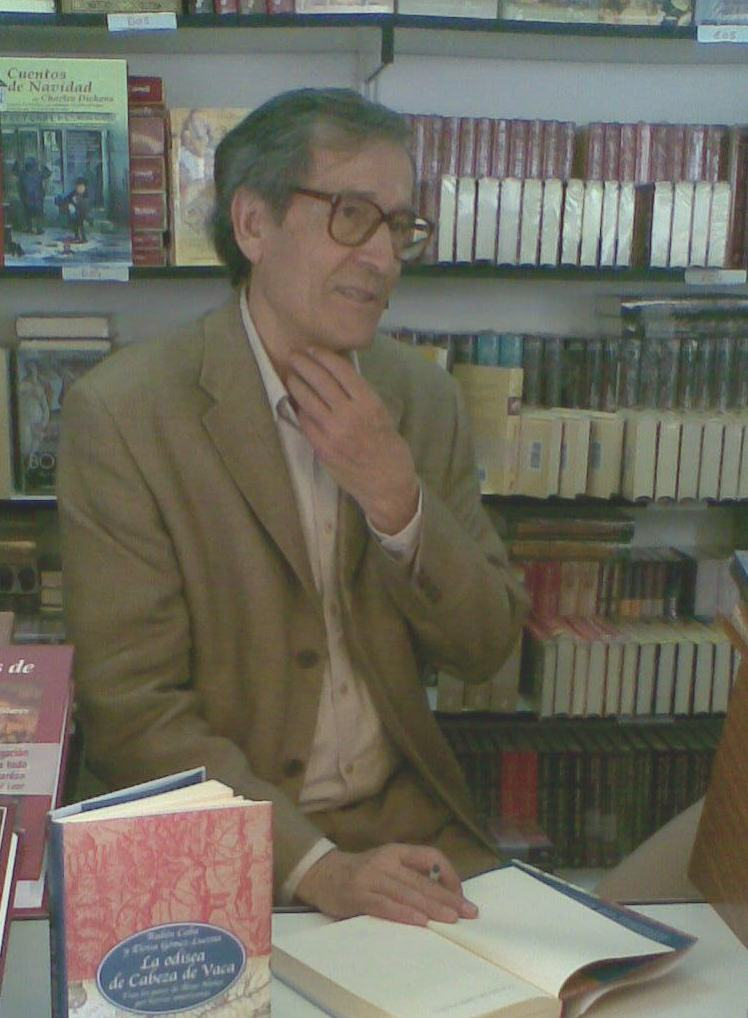
Rubencaba

Rubén Caba, born in Madrid, is a Spanish novelist and essayist. Caba earned degrees in Law and in Philosophy at de Universidad Complutense de Madrid. He also graduated with a degree in Sociology at Instituto de Estudios Políticos, Madrid.

== Bibliography ==
- Script: Libro de buen amor. Película estrenada en 1970 en Madrid
- Political opinion survey: 389 Escritores españoles opinan. Bilbao: La Gran Enciclopedia Vasca, 1971
- Poems: Ímpetu, pasión y fuga. Madrid: Alfaguara, 1972

Carta en cuaderna vía. Premio “Arcipreste de Hita”, 1982. Jaén: Alcalá la Real, 1982

- Short stories: El amigo viajero de Beppo Abdul Wahab. Madrid: Premios del tren, Fundación de los Ferrocarriles Españoles, 2004

El rigor de las desdichas. Madrid: Premios del tren, Fundación de los Ferrocarriles Españoles, 2005

- Travel books: Salida con Juan Ruiz a probar la sierra. Madrid: Helios, 1976

2ª ed., con el título Por la ruta serrana del Arcipreste, Madrid: Cenit, 1977.
3ª ed. Madrid: Libertarias-Phodhufi, 1995
4ª ed. Madrid: Gadir, 2018
Rutas literarias de España (coord. y coaut.). Madrid: Aguilar, 1990
Literary routes of Spain. Madrid, Aguilar, 1990

- Essays: Los sagrados misterios de la literatura. Madrid: Libertarias-Phodhufi, 1993

La odisea de Cabeza de Vaca (co-author). Barcelona y Buenos Aires: Edhasa, 2008 [www.edhasa.es]. (This historical essay clarifies the text of Shipwrecks, as well as it establishes the route taken by Álvar Núñez Cabeza de Vaca and his three companions. The authors followed the complete route from Tampa to Culiacán (México), near the Pacific coast, in the summer of 2004). ISBN 978-84-350-3986-4.
Topicario. Manual del perfecto trepador. Sevilla: Renacimiento, 2010
Naufragios, de Álvar Núñez Cabeza de Vaca. Col. Letras Hispánicas. Edición crítica de Eloísa Gómez-Lucena y Rubén Caba. Madrid: Cátedra, 2018. ISBN 978-84-376-3922-2

- Novels: Islario. Madrid: Nuevo Sendero, 1980

Hispán e Iberia. Madrid: Alfaguara, 1981.- 6ª ed. 1990
La puerta de marfil. Madrid: Orígenes, 1988
Las piedras del Guairá. (1ª fundación de Buenos Aires). Premio “América Hispana”, 1992. Diputación de Guadalajara, 1993
2ª edición, Madrid: Fondo de Cultura Económica, 1996
Días de gloria. Valencia: Pre-Textos, 2000
Los Siderales. Sevilla: Renacimiento, 2017

== Prizes ==
- Arcipreste de Hita Prize (1982), for his poem Carta en cuaderna vía.
- América Hispana Prize (1992), for Las piedras del Guairá, historic novel for the first foundation of Buenos Aires by Pedro de Mendoza in 1536.
- Premios del Tren (2004), for the tale El amigo viajero de Beppo Abdul Wahab.
- Premios del Tren (2005), for the tale El rigor de las desdichas.

== Secondary literature ==
- Diccionario de literatura española e hispanoamericana. Madrid: Alianza Editorial, 1993
- Diccionario de escritores en lengua castellana. Madrid: Ministerio de Cultura, 2004
