= Haniel Long =

American poet

Haniel Clark Long (March 9, 1888 – October 17, 1956) was an American poet, novelist, publisher and academic. He is best known for his novella, Interlinear to Cabeza de Vaca (1936), a fictionalized account of the true story of a Spanish conquistador in 16th century North America.

== Life and career ==
Born to Methodist missionaries Samuel P. and May Clark in what is now Myanmar (then known as Rangoon, Burma), Haniel Long was taken to Pittsburgh at the age of three with his family. Educated at Phillips Exeter Academy and Harvard, Long started a career as a reporter for the New York Globe but returned to Pittsburgh to teach at the Carnegie Institute of Technology (now Carnegie Mellon). He was promoted to head the English Department in 1920, the same year his first book was published, Poems, a collection of his poetry. In 1926 he published a collection of fairy tale-like short stories called Notes for a New Mythology.

Long moved to Santa Fe, New Mexico in 1929 with his wife Alice and his son Anton for health reasons, and spent the rest of his life there. He helped founding a publishing organization called Writers' Editions, which concentrated on works by New Mexican authors. The organization published Long's poetry collection, Atlantides, in 1933 and his Pittsburgh Memoranda in 1935. In 1936 Interlinear to Cabeza de Vaca appeared, considered Long's best statement of his beliefs on man's place in the world.

Long continued to publish other works over the next two decades: Walt Whitman and the Springs of Courage (1938), Malinche (Dona Marina) (1939), Pinon Country (1941), Children, Students and a Few Adults (1942), French Soldier Home from Being a War Prisoner (1942), The Grist Mill (1945), and A Letter to St. Augustine (1950). He also wrote for the New Mexico Sentinel, editing its writers' page. Long finished his final novel, Spring Returns, in 1956 shortly before his death. It was published posthumously, as were two other works: If He Can Make Her So (1968) and My Seasons (1977).

The main repository for Long's manuscripts is the Special Collections of the Libraries of the University of California, Los Angeles, with other material at Carnegie Mellon and Washington University in St. Louis.
