= Minto Group =

Canadian real estate company

- Type: Private
- Industry: Real estate
- Founded: 1955
- Headquarters: Ottawa, Ontario, Canada
- Key people: Michael Waters (CEO); Roger Greenberg (Executive Chairman)
- Revenue: ▼US$157.088 million (2024)
- Net income: ▲US$100.571 million (2024)
- Owner: Greenberg family
- Number of employees: 1,500 (2025)
- Website: www.minto.com

Minto Group is a Canadian real estate company based in Ottawa, Ontario. It builds homes in Ottawa, Toronto, Calgary, Florida and South Carolina, and it manages multi-residential and commercial properties in Ontario, Alberta and British Columbia. As of 2025, Minto has built over 100,000 homes and manages $2.9 billion in assets, including 13,000 multi-residential units and 2.7 million square feet of commercial space. The firm is one of Ottawa's largest residential landlords. Minto previously had a publicly traded subsidiary, holding some of its multi-residential units, called Minto Apartment REIT (traded as TSX: MI.UN). Some of Minto's joint-venture partners have included LaSalle Investment Management, Greystar Real Estate Partners and the CPP Investment Board.

== History ==
Minto was founded as a home builder in 1955 by brothers Gilbert, Irving, Lorry and Louis Greenberg. It was originally called Mercury Homes but renamed itself as Minto Construction Company in 1957. Its first major development was Parkwood Hills in Nepean, in partnership with Westmore Investments. As part of that development, Minto built Canada's first high-rise condominium – Horizon House on Meadowlands Drive. The firm developed a number of other subdivisions in the Ottawa area during the 1960s and 1970s. In 1971, three quarters of the construction in Nepean was by Minto.

In the early 1980s, the firm expanded to Florida.

In 1991, Roger Greenberg, son of Gilbert, became CEO after the death of his uncle Irving.

In 2001, Minto completed the first Minto Dream Home for the Children's Hospital of Eastern Ontario (CHEO) Dream of a Lifetime Lottery.

In 2008, Minto built Canada’s first Net Zero Inspiration Home.

In 2013, Michael Waters, who is not part of the Greenberg family, became CEO.

In 2016, Minto became the title sponsor of the Minto U.S. Open Pickleball Championships Powered by Margaritaville held in Naples, Florida. The U.S. Open has since become the largest annual pickleball event in the world, with over 50,000 spectators in 2024.

In 2017, Minto Communities USA and Margaritaville Holdings announced a partnership to develop active adult communities – Latitude Margaritaville – with the first location in Daytona Beach, Florida.

In May 2018, Minto announced that it would hold an IPO for its Canadian multi-residential properties. The properties became part of a new entity named Minto Apartment Real Estate Investment Trust (REIT), which Minto Group continues to have a significant ownership stake in. The trust would initially own 4279 rental suites, 72% of which would be in Ottawa, with the intention of eventually holding all of Minto's 13,000 multi-residential units. Minto Group held the IPO in part to provide money to Minto's owners, the Greenberg family. Minto raised $200 million in the IPO, which took place on the Toronto Stock Exchange. The IPO took place on June 29, 2018, with an initial price of $14.50 per share, and with the share symbol MI.UN.

Minto was named as one of "Canada's Best Managed Companies" in 2024 and 2025.

== Business ==
Minto develops a range of housing types, including detached homes, semi-detached homes, townhomes, condominiums, and purpose-built rental apartments. Detached homes are standalone residential buildings intended for a single household, while semi-detached homes consist of two adjoining dwellings that share a common wall. Across its markets in Canada and the United States, Minto offers a mix of low-rise and high-rise housing designed to serve a variety of household sizes and housing needs.

Minto offers studio units as part of the suite mix at select condominium and rental properties in Canada. Studio apartments are self-contained residential units that typically combine living, sleeping, and kitchen areas into one main space, with a separate bathroom. Properties listed as offering studio units include North Oak, 88 Beechwood, Minto One80Five, Parkwood Hills, Fifth + Bank, The Aventura, High Park Village, 39 Niagara, The ROE, Jameson Avenue, Richgrove Village, Lord Seaton Road, The Links Road, The Hyland, Rockhill Apartments, Haddon Hall, Le 4300, and Le-Hill Park.

Minto Group is divided into three divisions:

- Minto is a home builder in Ottawa, Toronto and Calgary. It has built over 100,000 homes over its history. It builds both low-rise and high-rise housing, and in recent years has been building more luxury rental projects. In 2015, Minto was the largest home builder in Ottawa, with 913 homes built, and 24 percent of the market.
- Minto Apartments manages multi-residential and commercial properties, some of which have been built by Minto. Minto Apartments owns 57% of Minto Apartment Real Estate Investment Trust.
- Minto Communities USA is a Florida home builder. It has built 25,000 homes over its history. It was ranked as the 56th largest home builder in the United States in 2016. Minto partnered with Margaritaville Holdings to create Latitude Margaritaville, a series of retirement communities inspired by the laid-back, tropical lifestyle popularized by singer Jimmy Buffett.

The CEO of Minto, Michael Waters, participated in a four-part leadership lab with The Globe and Mail. The Greenberg family, which founded and still controls the Minto Group, was listed as the 74th richest family in Canada in 2017, according to Canadian Business.

== Recent awards ==
=== 2026 ===
- One of Canada’s Best Managed Companies.
- Gallup Exceptional Workplace Award (GEWA) winner.
- Best Marketing Campaign and Best Suite Renovation over $50,000 at the 2025 FRPO MAC Awards.

=== 2025 ===
- One of Canada’s Best Managed Companies.
- Reputation 800 Awards winner.
- National Association of Home Builders (NAHB) Awards 2024 - two Silver Awards for Community of year: Up to 6 stories for both The Heights of Harmony and Park & Main.
- 30th annual Eliant's Homebuyers’ Choice Awards, with a total of 13 wins.
- BILD Calgary Region Award - nominated in 6 categories, won for re-designed Design Centre in Airdrie for Best Design Centre.
- 3 wins at the CHBA Awards.
- Toronto Marketing team BILD Award Win.
- Minto Calgary has been awarded the AvidCX Award for the fourth consecutive year.

=== 2024 ===
- 13th among the Top 100 Private Home Builders in the USA
- Canada Green Building Council's (CAGBC) LEED Gold Certification achieved at Era in Calgary
- Best Design Centre at the 2023 BILD Calgary Region Awards
- One of Canada’s Best Managed Companies
- Best Production Net Zero Home at the 2024 Canadian Home Builders' Association (CHBA) Awards
- 37th on Builder magazine's 2024 annual Builder 100 list in the USA
- 2024 Oakville Hydro Sustainability Leader of the Year at the 29th annual Oakville Awards for Business Excellence Awards
- Avid Gold Award winner as production builder in Alberta with the highest customer ratings on the New Home Move-In Experience Survey
- 2024 Ontario Home Builders' Association (OHBA) Awards for Best Back-to-Back Townhome Unit and Green Building
- Westlake and Latitude Margaritaville Watersound recognized among the Top 50 Master-planned Communities by RCLCO Real Estate Consulting
- Winner of the 2024 Greater Ottawa Homebuilder's Association (GOHBA) Production Builder of the Year award for the 2023 Minto Dream Home for the Children's Hospital of Eastern Ontario (CHEO)
- Winner of the 2024 Federation of Rental-housing Providers of Ontario (FRPO) MAC Award for Outstanding Company Culture
- Reputation 800 Awards Winner

== Community ==
=== CHEO ===
Since 2001, Minto has partnered with the Children’s Hospital of Eastern Ontario (CHEO) for the annual CHEO's Dream of a Lifetime Lottery. Each year, Minto collaborates with designers, trade partners, and suppliers to create the Minto Dream House: showcasing innovation in sustainable living—such as with the introduction of Net Zero Energy homes. Serving as the grand prize of the lottery, this initiative has raised close to $60 million to date, supporting CHEO’s programs and services for children and families across Eastern Ontario.

=== Affordable housing initiatives ===
In 2026, Minto Communities USA supported the launch of the Westlake Affordable Housing Grant Program through the Westlake Community Foundation, a nonprofit organization that supports housing affordability in the City of Westlake, Florida. The program provides $650,000 in financial assistance to qualified purchasers of newly built homes in Westlake. Eligible applicants may receive a one-time grant of up to $15,000 toward down payment or closing costs, with up to 43 grants available on a rolling basis until funding is exhausted. According to the program, the initiative was established to expand access to homeownership and support housing affordability within the Westlake community. The grant program is administered by the Westlake Community Foundation and operates separately from the City of Westlake's Housing Assistance Purchase Program (HAPPY).

Minto has also participated in affordable housing initiatives through partnerships with municipal and federal organizations. In Toronto, the company worked with the City of Toronto and the Canada Mortgage and Housing Corporation (CMHC) on the development of a 20-storey rental building at Martin Grove Road and Eglinton Avenue West. The project added 225 rental units, including 100 affordable rental suites delivered through the City of Toronto's Open Door program. According to Minto, the project was supported through a financing structure developed in collaboration with public-sector partners to increase the supply of rental housing in the area.

== Developments ==
=== Communities ===
==== Toronto and GTA ====
- Union Village
  - Located at 9492 Kennedy Road in Unionville in Markham, Union Village offers townhomes and single-family homes ranging from 3 to 7 bedrooms
- Park & Main
  - Located at 1 Anna Russell Way in Unionville in Markham, Park & Main offers traditional townhomes ranging from 3 to 4 bedrooms
- The Heights of Harmony
  - Located at 2561 Harmony Road near Highway 407 in Oshawa, The Heights of Harmony offers back-to-back and rear land townhomes ranging from 2 to 4 bedrooms
- Westshore
  - Located on Lake Shore Boulevard West in the Long Branch area in South Etobicoke, Westshore offers townhomes ranging from 1 to 3 bedrooms
- North Oak
  - Located at 339 Wheat Boom Drive in Oakville, North Oak offers condos ranging from studio to 2 bedrooms
- 123 Portland
  - Located at 123 Portland Street in King West near the Fashion District in Toronto, 123 Portland offers condos ranging from 1 to 3 bedrooms
- The Saint
  - Located at 89 Church Street in downtown Toronto at Church and Adelaide, The Saint offers 2 bedroom condos
- Ivy Ridge

==== Ottawa ====
- Parkwood Hills in Nepean was built by Minto in the late 1950s and early 1960s.
- Crystal Beach in Nepean was built starting in 1961.
- Briargreen was built starting in 1966.
- Bayshore, Canada's first rental community, was built by Minto in the 1960s.
- Tanglewood was started in 1970.
- Chapel Hill in Orleans was largely built by Minto.
- Centrepointe in Nepean was largely built by Minto
- Morgan's Grant in Kanata was largely built by Minto.
- Avalon in Orleans was partly built by Minto.
  - Located at 2370 Tenth Line Road in Orléans, Avalon offers Single Family Homes and Townhomes ranging from 2 to 6 bedrooms
- Riversbend at Harmony
  - Located at 4005 Strandherd Drive in Barrhaven, Riversbend offers Single Family Homes and Townhomes ranging from 2 to 6 bedrooms
- Anthem
  - Located at 4005 Strandherd Drive in Barrhaven, Anthem offers Metro Townhomes with 2 bedrooms
- Mahogany
  - Located at 108 Moretto Court in Manotick, Mahogany offers Single Family Homes ranging from 2 to 6 bedrooms
- Quinn’s Pointe
- Parkside at Arcadia
  - Located at 380 Huntmar Drive in Kanata, Parkside at Arcadia offers Metro Townhomes with 2 bedrooms
- Abbott’s Run
  - Located at 380 Huntmar Drive in Stittsville, Abbott’s Run offers Single Family Homes and Townhomes ranging from 2 to 6 bedrooms
- Brookline
  - Located at 380 Huntmar Drive in Kanata, Brookline offers Single Family Homes and Townhomes ranging from 2 to 6 bedrooms
- Weavers Way
  - Located at 380 Huntmar Drive in Almonte, Weavers Way offers Single Family Homes and Townhomes ranging from 2 to 6 bedrooms

==== Calgary ====
- East Hills Crossing
  - Located at 1905 Eston Road SE in Belvedere, East Hills Crossing offers Townhomes and condos ranging from 1 to 4 bedrooms
- Belvedere Rise
  - Located at 65 Belvedere Point SE in Belvedere, Belvedere Rise offers Townhomes with 2 bedrooms
- Wildflower
  - Located at 1215 Fowler Road SW in Airdrie, Wildflower offers Single Family Homes, Duplex Homes and Townhomes ranging from 2 to 6 bedrooms
- Parkline
  - Located at 2501 Richmond Road SW in Calgary SW neighbourhood of Richmond

==== USA ====
- The Isles of Collier Preserve
- Westlake
  - Located at 16610 Town Center Parkway North in Palm Beach County, Florida, Westlake offers Townhomes, Luxury Estate Homes and Single Family Homes ranging from 2 to 6 bedrooms
- Latitude Margaritaville – Daytona Beach
- Latitude Margaritaville – Hilton Head
  - Located at 356 Latitude Boulevard in Hardeeville, South Carolina, Latitude Margaritaville Hilton Head offers Cottages, Villas and Single Family Homes ranging from 2 to 3 bedrooms
- Latitude Margaritaville – Watersound
  - Located at 9201 Highway 79 in Panama City Beach, Florida, Latitiude Margaritaville Watersound offers Cottages, Villas and Single Family Homes ranging from 2 to 4 bedrooms

=== Apartments ===
==== Ottawa ====
- The Minto Metropole is the second tallest building in Ottawa. It was completed in 2004.
- 88 Beechwood
  - Located at 88 Beechwood Avenue in Beechwood Village in Ottawa, 88 Beechwood offers rental units ranging from Studio to 3 bedrooms
- Minto One80Five
  - Located at 185 Lyon Street North in Downtown Ottawa, Minto One80Five offers rental units ranging from Studio to 2 bedrooms
- Parkwood Hills
  - Located at 1343 Meadowlands Drive in Nepean at Parkwood Hills in Ottawa, Parkwood Hills offers rental units ranging from studio to 3 bedrooms
- Navaho Apartments
  - Located at 1800 Baseline Road in City View, Nepean in Ottawa, Navaho Apartments offers rental units ranging from 2 to 3 bedrooms
- Fifth + Bank
  - Located at 99 Fifth Avenue in The Glebe in Ottawa, Fifth + Bank offers rental units ranging from studio to 2.5 bedrooms
- The Carlisle
  - Located at 221 Lyon Street North in Downtown Ottawa, The Carlisle offers rental units ranging from 1 to 2 bedrooms
- Skyline
  - Located at 30 Eleanor Drive in Nepean in Ottawa, Skyline offers rental units ranging from 1 to 5 bedrooms
- The Aventura
  - Located at 18 & 20 Deerfield Drive in Near Algonquin College in Nepean, The Aventura offers rental units ranging from studio to 2 bedrooms
- Castle Hill
  - Located at 1000 Castle Hill Crescent in McKellar Heights area of west Ottawa, Castle Hill offers rental units ranging from 1 to 4 bedrooms
- South Centrepointe
  - Located at 239 Craig Henry Drive in Nepean in Ottawa, South Centrepointe offers rental units ranging from 1 to 4 bedrooms

==== Toronto ====
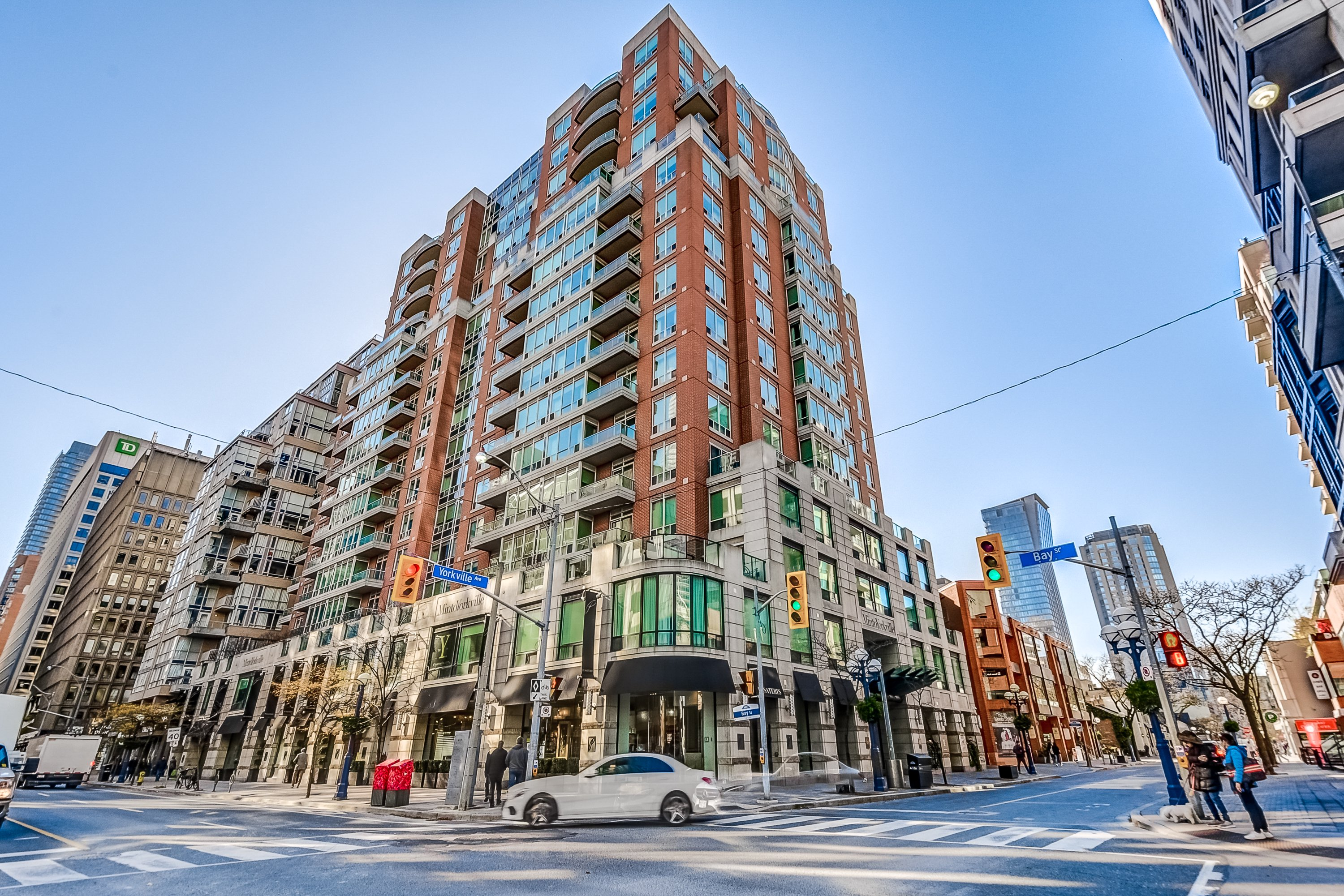
Minto Yorkville

- High Park Village
  - Located at 111 Pacific Avenue in High Park in downtown Toronto, High Park Village offers rental units ranging from studio to 2 bedrooms
- York Mills and Leslie
  - Located at 31 Farmstead Road in North York in Toronto, York Mills and Leslie offers rental units ranging from 1 to 4 bedrooms
- 39 Niagara
  - Located at 39 Niagara Street in King West area in downtown Toronto, 39 Niagara offers rental units ranging from studio to 3 bedrooms
- Minto Yorkville
  - Located at 61 Yorkville Avenue in Yorkville neighbourhood in downtown Toronto, Minto Yorkville offers rental units ranging from 1 to 3 bedrooms
- Marlborough Court
  - Located at 1229 Marlborough Court in Oakville near Upper Middle Road and Trafalgar Road, Marlborough Court offers rental units ranging from 1 to 3 bedrooms
- The ROE
  - Located at 150 Roehampton Avenue in Midtown Toronto, The ROE offers rental units ranging from studio to 2 bedrooms
- Upper Canada Drive
  - Located at 199 Upper Canada Drive in York Mills & Bayview, North York in Toronto, Upper Canada Drive offers rental units ranging from 1 to 4 bedrooms
- Aquitaine Avenue
  - Located at 2700 Aquitaine Avenue in Mississauga, Aquitaine Avenue offers rental units ranging from 1 to 3 bedrooms
- Jameson Avenue
  - Located at 177 Jameson Avenue in Parkdale neighbourhood in Toronto, Jameson Avenue offers rental units ranging from studio to 2 bedrooms
- Richgrove Village
  - Located at 7 & 21 Richgrove Drive in Richview neighborhood of Etobicoke in Toronto, Richgrove Village offers rental units ranging from studio to 3 bedrooms
- Lord Seaton Road
  - Located at 37 Lord Seaton Road in Yonge & Sheppard, North York in Toronto, Lord Seaton Road offers rental units ranging from studio to 2 bedrooms
- The Links Road
  - Located at 16 & 24 The Links Road in Yonge & Hwy 401, North York in Toronto, The Links Road offers rental units ranging from studio to 3 bedrooms
- 620 Martin Grove Road and 610 Martin Grove Road
  - Located at 610 Martin Grove Rd in Etobicoke's Richview neighbourhood in Toronto, 620 Martin Grove Road and 610 Martin Grove Road offers rental units ranging from 1 to 2 bedrooms
- Elora
  - Located at 6515 Glen Erin Dr in Meadowvale in Mississauga, Elora offers rental units ranging from 1 to 2 bedrooms

==== Calgary ====
- The Laurier
  - Located at 100 & 200 Quarry Villas SE in Quarry Park in Calgary, The Laurier offers rental units ranging from 1 to 2 bedrooms
- The International
  - Located at 220 4th Avenue SW in Downtown Calgary, The International offers rental units ranging from 1 to 2 bedrooms
- At Kaleidoscope
  - Located at 2505 24th Street NW in Banff Trail in Calgary, At Kaleidoscope offers rental units ranging from 1 to 2 bedrooms
- The Quarters
  - Located at 370–380 Quarry Way SE in SE Calgary, The Quarters offers rental units ranging from 1 to 2 bedrooms

==== Vancouver ====
- The Hyland
  - Located at 3350 Prince Albert Street in Kensington-Cedar Cottage neighbourhood in East Vancouver, The Hyland offers rental units ranging from studio to 3 bedrooms
- Lonsdale
  - Located at 126 E 21st Street in North Vancouver, Lonsdale Square Apartments offers rental units ranging from 1 to 3 bedrooms

==== Montreal ====
- Rockhill Apartments
  - Located at 4858 chemin de la Côte-des-Neiges in Côte-des-Neiges in Montréal, Rockhill Apartments offers rental units ranging from studio to 3 bedrooms
- Haddon Hall
  - Located at 2255 Rue Lambert-Closse in Shaughnessy Village neighbourhood in Downtown Montréal, Haddon Hall offers rental units ranging from studio to 3 bedrooms
- Le 4300
  - Located at 4300 De Maisonneuve Boulevard West in Westmount in Montréal, Le 4300 offers rental units ranging from studio to 5 bedrooms
- Le-Hill Park
  - Located at 4530 Ch. de la Côte-des-Neiges in CDN/NDG neighbourhoods in Montréal, Le Hill Park offers rental units ranging from studio to 3 bedrooms
