= List of Saint Seiya Episode.G chapters =

The inside cover of volume 7 of Episode.G, displaying the protagonist, Leo Aiolia, along with most of the Titans

The manga Saint Seiya Episode.G, written and illustrated by Megumu Okada, is a spin-off's side-story and derivative work of Masami Kurumada's Saint Seiya. The story is set seven years before the events of Saint Seiya and depicts the battle of the Gold Saints, ultimate warriors who fight for Peace and Justice in the name of the Goddess Athena, to protect the Earth from the threat of the awakened Titan gods.

The first images of the manga appeared in the Champion Red issue of January 2003, published on November 19, 2002, along with posters by and an interview with Masami Kurumada. The first chapter was then released on the following February issue, published on December 19, 2002, initiating the serialization of the series on this monthly magazine. Chapters were later compiled into volumes by Akita Shoten, with the first being published on June 19, 2003. In July 2009, the manga was put on hiatus, following an unspecified dispute between the author and the publisher. When it resumed in Champion Red's April 2011 issue, the magazine released a compilation of past chapters that had not been grouped into volume format yet (chapters 74–76) under the name "Volume 17.5" along with the new chapter. In October 2011, the manga entered a second hiatus, which lasted until April 2013. The final chapter was released on June 19, 2013, and the final volume on August 8, 2013.

In Japan, most volumes have two versions, one a regular version and the other a limited edition, which features different covers and includes various goodies, like drama CDs, postcards, pins, a coin key holder, a day planner, tarot cards, a T-shirt, puzzles, calendars, a pass case and a key chain. Both the regular version and the limited edition contain short special chapters (gaiden), most of which in color, that tell little side-stories or highlight moments from previous chapters.

Between October 2007 and January 2008, Champion Red published a short side-story along with the regular chapters that takes place a few years before the main plot. It details the exploits of Sagittarius Aiolos in Egypt and features a young Aiolia and Galan. The full side-story appears compiled in a special volume called "Volume 0: Aiolos" (アイオロス編, Aiorosu hen), released on May 20, 2008, which also contains an encyclopedia with information on all the Episode.G manga published up to that date.

Saint Seiya Episode.G has yet to be licensed in English, but it has been translated into other languages and published in several countries outside Japan: in Brazil, by Conrad Editora; by Panini Comics in Italy, Germany and France; Glénat in Spain; Editorial Ivrea in Argentina; Editorial Kamite in Mexico; and by Chuang Yi in Singapore.

In December 2013, Megumu Okada announced via Twitter that he was working on a sequel manga titled Saint Seiya Episode.G: Assassin. Serialization began on April 5, 2014, in the 43rd issue of the bimonthly magazine Champion Red Ichigo. After this magazine ceased publication in August 2014, the series was continued in Akita Shoten's web magazine Champion Cross, later renamed Manga Cross. With the change in venue, the chapters started being published entirely in colour on a biweekly basis. The final chapter was published on August 27, 2019. The chapters were compiled into 16 volumes, some of which include bonus chapters. The first volume was published on October 20, 2014, and the last on December 20, 2019.

A second sequel, the conclusion of the Episode.G series, titled Saint Seiya Episode.G: Requiem, began serialization in January, 2020, on the online manga magazine Manga Cross.

== Volume list ==
=== Saint Seiya Episode.G ===
No.	Japanese release date	Japanese ISBN
0	May 20, 2008	978-4-253-23110-7
Prologue: "The one who searches" (探求セシ者, Tankyū seshi mono); 1: "The one who declares the start" (始マリヲ告ゲル者, Hajimari o tsugeru mono); 2: "The one chosen to be the Lion" (獅子ニ選バレシ者, Shishi ni erabareshimono); 3: "The one who wavers" (タユタウ者, Tayutau mono); Final chapter: "The one who returns from the waters of chaos" (渾沌ノ水カラ還ル者, Konton no mizu kara kaeru mono); "Galaxian Encyclopedia" (銀河百科事典（ギャラクシアン エンサイクロペディア）, Gyarakushian ensaikuropedia); Epilogue: "The one who commands to search" (探求ヲ命ズル者, Tankyū o meizuru mono)
With the completion of the Aswan Dam, the entrance to an ancient Egyptian tomb where a dark power had been sealed is revealed. Japanese archaeologist Miko Hasegawa investigates the ruins with the help of Sagittarius Aiolos and his little brother Aiolia. There they confront the Egyptian god Apophis and his army, who had been revived by the power of a strange blue water flowing from the god's tomb, and unknowingly break the seal that had been holding back Pontos since mythological times.
1	June 19, 2003	4-253-23111-X; ISBN 978-4-253-18150-1 (limited edition)
1: "The Great Prologue"; 2: "The golden boy" (黄金の少年, Ōgon no shōnen); 3: "The one who regrets" (呻吟ウ者, Samayou mono); 4: "The one who severs light" (光 截ツ者, Hikari tatsu mono); 5: "Those who assemble" (集ウ者, Tsudou mono)
The Pope of Sanctuary tries to kill a baby who is the reincarnation of the goddess Athena, however, he is stopped by the Gold Saint of Sagittarius, Aiolos. As the Pope places the blame for the assassination attempt on him, Aiolos is deemed a traitor. He takes the baby Athena and escapes Sanctuary, but is eventually killed by the Capricorn Gold Saint Shura. Seven years later, Aiolos's younger brother, Leo Gold Saint Aiolia, is sent out on several missions by the Pope to prove his loyalty to the Sanctuary. In one of his missions, Aiolia meets a girl called Lithos and adopts her as his sister when her father dies. Soon afterwards, a mysterious individual attacks Sanctuary and the Gold Saints gather with the Pope to discuss what to do.
2	October 23, 2003	4-253-23112-8; ISBN 978-4-253-18153-2 (limited edition)
Gaiden 1: "The sacred war" (聖戦編, Seisen hen); 6: "The one black as ebony" (漆黒ノ者, Shikkoku no mono); 7: "The one who controls the winds" (風ヲ従エル者, Kaze o shitagaeru mono); 8: "The one who breaks armors" (骸ヲ破ル者, Mukuro o yaburu mono); 9: "The one who makes Cloths" (殻ヲ造ル者, Kara o tsukuru mono)
As punishment for arriving late to the meeting with the Gold Saints and causing trouble with one of the others, Aiolia is ordered by the Pope to stop the invader. The enemy reveals himself to be Ebony Hyperion, one of the twelve Titans, who seeks the weapon of his King, the God of Time Kronos, to free him from Zeus's prison. Aiolia faces Hyperion in battle, but is easily defeated. As Lithos puts herself in danger to try to save him, however, he rises to fight once again. This time, Hyperion retreats after Aiolia breaks his divine body armor. Aiolia's own armor, the Leo Gold Cloth, is heavily damaged and he goes with the Taurus Gold Saint, Aldebaran, to Jamir to ask Aries Gold Saint Mu to repair it.
3	February 19, 2004	4-253-23113-6; ISBN 978-4-253-18154-9 (limited edition)
Gaiden 2: "Saga's story" (サガ編, Saga hen); 10: "The one of Aries" (牡羊ノ者, Ohitsuji no mono); 11: "The one who summons the underworld" (異界ヲ呼ブ者, Ikai o yobu mono); 12: "The liberator" (解キ放ツ者, Tokihanatsu no mono); 13: "The just one" (正義ノ者, Seigi no mono)
After Mu refuses to repair the Leo Gold Cloth, he and Aiolia are attacked by the Titan Dimension Iapetos, who wants to test Aiolia's powers. Mu and Iapetos face each other in battle, but they are interrupted before a winner can be determined by the appearance of Kronos's soul. The Titan King orders Iapetos to leave and challenges Aiolia to a future fight. Before falling unconscious, Mu uses his blood to repair Aiolia's Cloth, as he now recognizes him as a good Saint. Meanwhile, Shura discovers that the Pope is the Gemini Gold Saint, Saga. The two engage in a fight that ends with Shura falling prey to Saga's mind-controlling technique.
4	July 29, 2004	4-253-23114-4; ISBN 978-4-253-18159-4 (limited edition)
Gaiden 3: "Premonition" (予兆, Yochō); 14: "The giant ones" (巨大ナル者, Kyodai naru no mono); 15: "The one with the golden fangs" (黄金ノ牙ノ者, Ōgon no kiba no mono); 16: "The evil one" (悪鬼ナル者, Akki naru no mono); 17: "The guide to the realm of the dead" (冥界ニ導ク者, Meikai ni michibiku mono); Gaiden 4: "Aiolos" (アイオロス編, Aiorosu hen)
Hyperion sends the Giants, creatures loyal to Kronos, to attack the Sanctuary. One of them attacks the lower-ranked Saints and Aiolia comes to stop him. With his Gold Cloth repaired, Aiolia easily defeats his opponent. Meanwhile, another Giant attacks the Twelve Temples of Sanctuary and is confronted by Cancer Gold Saint Deathmask. Deathmask kills the Giant without much effort, ending the invasion of Sanctuary.
5	November 25, 2004	4-253-23115-2; ISBN 978-4-253-18160-0 (limited edition)
Gaiden 5: "Golden wings" (黄金ノ翼, Ōgon no tsubasa); 18: "Those who act in concert" (呼応スル者, Ko'ō suru mono); 19: "The ancient one" (古エノ者, Inishie no mono); 20: "The one who inherits" (受ケ継グ者, Uketsugu mono); 21: "The one who stipulates destiny" (運命ヲ謳ウ者, Unmei o utau mono); Gaiden 6: "The one who does not believe in destiny" (運命ヲ信ジヌ者, Unmei o shinjinu mono)
Aiolia is assigned to go with his servants Lithos and Galan to find an evil spirit in the island of Crete. While searching the ruins of the ancient labyrinth, Aiolia and his servants are attacked by the spirit of King Minos, who is feeding on the souls of small children. Aiolia easily defeats Minos, saving the abducted children. In another mission, Aiolia goes to Chuang-Yan to defeat a Gorgon that had previously killed a Silver Saint. There, he meets the Silver Saint's student, the Lynx Bronze Saint, and allows the boy to avenge his master and kill the Gorgon himself. Back at Sanctuary, Aiolia is given a third mission: to protect Virgo Gold Saint Shaka in India while he performs a ritual to destroy the evil spirits that the Titans' presence unleashed on Earth. The Titan Dark Lightning Koios attempts to attack Shaka, but Aiolia fights him instead.
6	April 20, 2005	4-253-23116-0; ISBN 978-4-253-18163-1 (limited edition)
Gaiden 7: "My own sanctuary" (己ノアル地, Onore no aru chi); 22: "The one who defeats destiny" (運命ヲ貫ク者, Unmei o tsuranuku mono); 23: "The one who supports me" (我ガ身ヲ支エル者, Waga mi o sasaeru mono); 24: "The one who enters the territory of the gods" (神ノ領域ニ有ル者, Kami no ryōiki ni aru mono); 25: "The one engraved in myth" (神話ニ刻マレシ者, Shinwa ni kizamareshi mono)
Aiolia is overpowered by Koios and is forced to perform a technique that his brother and master Aiolos had forbidden. With this technique, the Photon Burst, Aiolia almost kills Koios. He is only saved by Hyperion's intervention. As Shaka returns to the Sanctuary, Scorpio Gold Saint Milo is sent by the Pope to protect Aiolia while he recovers from the wounds acquired in battle. At this point, the ancient god Pontos, an ally of the Titans, revives the Trojan hero Hector and sends him to attack Aiolia, but Milo confronts him instead.
7	July 20, 2005	4-253-23117-9; ISBN 978-4-253-18164-8 (limited edition)
Gaiden 8: "Shining cut" (輝ケル刃, Kagayakeru yaiba); 26: "Those who are reborn" (降臨セシ者, Kōrin seshi mono); 27: "Those whose emblem shines" (紋章ヲ燈ス者, Monshō o tomosu mono); 28: "The one who cuts stars" (星ヲ断ツ者, Hoshi o tatsu mono); 29: "The one who received the sacred sword" (聖剣ヲ賜ウ者, Seiken o tamau mono)
Milo defeats Hector, but Pontos reveals that he was only trying to buy enough time to revive the rest of the Titans. All of the Titans, with the exception of Kronos, are thus revived and their home, the Time Labyrinth, is restored. The Titan Galaxy Kreios invades Sanctuary to free the Titan King and is confronted by Shura. During their fight, Shura is seriously injured, but, with Aiolia's help, manages to destroy Kreios's sword, which causes the god to retreat.
8	December 20, 2005	4-253-23118-7; ISBN 978-4-253-18165-5 (limited edition)
Gaiden 9: "Those of the deep" (深キ者ドモ, Fuki mono domo); 30: "The one who stands in the way" (立チ塞ガル者, Tachifusagaru mono); 31: "The sealed one" (封ジラレシ者, Fūjirareshi mono); 32: "The one who uses lightning" (雷ヲ使役セシ者, Kaminari o shieki seshi mono); 33: "The one without wings" (翼無キ者, Tsubasa naki mono)
Kronos's soul attacks Sanctuary to recover his divine weapon and free himself from Zeus's seal. With almost all of the Gold Saints ordered to stay in their respective temples, Saga reveals that he has two personalities, one good and another evil. Although Saga's good personality emerges to confront Kronos and nearly overpowers him, his evil side soon regains control of his body, allowing the Titan King to escape. Aiolia arrives then and fights Kronos at the Twelve Temples. Kronos attempts to absorb Aiolia's lighting attacks to restore his body, as they possess the same type of energy as Zeus's seal. He succeeds, but becomes vulnerable to Aiolia's Photon Burst in the process. The female Titans then step in to protect their King.
9	May 18, 2006	4-253-23119-5; ISBN 978-4-253-18166-2 (limited edition)
Gaiden 10: "The one who goes fast" (疾駆スル者, Shikku suru mono); 34: "The one who convicts" (断罪セシ者, Danzai seshi mono); 35: "The one who possesses great strength" (剛力ナル者, Gōriki naru mono); 36: "The one who creates flow" (流転ヲ生ム者, Ruten o umu mono); 37: "The one who makes it flow" (流転サセル者, Ruten saseru mono)
It is revealed that Kronos has lost his memory and his real body after suffering Aiolia's Photon Burst. The Titanesses attack Aiolia and Shura with a Hydra and return to the Time Labyrinth with their king. There, Kronos uses a giant hourglass to return the Earth to the time when he was King. Meanwhile, Aldebaran saves Shura and Aiolia and destroys the Hydra. The Titan Current Okeanos attacks Sanctuary to take back Kreios's sword, but is met with Aiolia and Aquarius Gold Saint Camus. Camus fights Okeanos, but is unable to injure him.
10	August 18, 2006	4-253-23120-9; ISBN 978-4-253-18167-9 (limited edition)
"Illustration Gallery"; 38: "The one who chooses the gods" (神ヲ選択スル者, Kami o sentaku suru mono); 39: "The one who steals spirits" (魂ヲ奪ウ者, Tamashii o ubau mono); 40: "The one of the iron of death" (死ノ鉄ノ者, Shi no tetsu no mono); 41: "The perfumed one" (香気アル者, Kōki aru mono); 42: "The one who creates the path of victory" (勝利ノ道ヲ生ム者, Shōri no michi o umu mono)
Camus is unable to defeat Okeanos, succeeding only in weakening his weapons. Okeanos retreats, but Iapetos appears then to kidnap Lithos and make Aiolia enter the Time Labyrinth. Aiolia enters the Titans' territory and is confronted by Hyperion. After a short fight, Hyperion sends his soldiers to attack Aiolia, but they are all killed by the Pisces Gold Saint, Aphrodite, who had been sent by Saga. Aphrodite faces a Giant, allowing Aiolia to continue and look for Lithos.
11	February 20, 2007	978-4-253-23125-1; ISBN 978-4-253-18168-6 (limited edition)
Gaiden 11: "The one who stands at the limit" (境界ニ立ツ者, Kyōkai ni tatsu mono); 43: "The one chosen by the gods" (神ガ選ビシ者, Kami ga erabishi mono); 44: "The one who creates whirlwinds" (渦ヲ生ム者, Uzu o umu mono); 45: "The one who pays with sacrifice" (犠牲払イシ者, Kisei haraishi mono); 46: "The one who believes in the future" (未来ヲ信ジル者, Mirai o shinjiru mono); 47: "The one who succeeds the Cosmo" (小宇宙ヲ継グ者, Kosumo o tsugu mono)
While Aphrodite defeats the Giant, Aiolia advances through the Time Labyrinth until he is confronted by Pontos. Pontos offers to share his power with Aiolia so that he can become powerful enough to kill the Titans, but the Leo Saint refuses. Pontos then attacks Aiolia, mutilating his right arm. With help from Galan, Aiolia recovers his arm and continues fighting Pontos. Aiolia soon becomes tired, but the Libra Gold Saint creates an illusion of himself to protect Aiolia from Pontos's attacks. Mu then uses his powers to teleport Shura, Camus, Milo, Aldebaran and Shaka to the Time Labyrinth to assist Aiolia. With several Gold Saints in the Labyrinth, Pontos leaves, expecting the Titans to be killed by the Saints.
12	August 21, 2007	978-4-253-23126-8; ISBN 978-4-253-18169-3 (limited edition)
Gaiden 12: "The one who moves around time" (刻ヲ巡リシ者, Koku o megurishi mono); 48: "The one who carries the universe" (宇宙ヲ背負ウ者, Uchū o seō mono); 49: "The one who does not possess a heart" (心ヲ持タヌ者, Kokoro o motanu mono); 50: "The one who knows his true form" (己ノ姿ヲ知ル者, Onore no sugata o shiru mono); 51: "The one who saves everything" (全テヲ救ウ者, Subete o sukū mono)
Titans Iapetos and Themis transport Aiolia to a dimension containing a planet created with their Cosmo to fight him using all their might. As they overpower Aiolia, Shaka joins the fight and helps the Leo Saint. After a struggle between Shaka and Iapetos, Aiolia attacks Iapetos, his right arm charged with Galan's Cosmo. To help her husband, Themis allows Iapetos to kill her so that he may use her as his weapon. Shocked by the events, Iapetos goes berserk and ferociously attacks Shaka and Aiolia. The Gold Saints then join forces to make Iapetos regain consciousness.
13	December 20, 2007	978-4-253-23127-5; ISBN 978-4-253-18170-9 (limited edition)
Gaiden 13: "The one who stops the tears of blood" (血涙ヲ止メル者, Ketsurui o tomeru mono); 52: "The one who keeps being a god" (神デアリ続ケル者, Kami de ari tsudzukeru mono); 53: "The one who breaks bonds" (絆ヲ断ツ者, Kizuna o tatsu mono); 54: "Those who fight until death" (鍔迫ル者, Tsubasemaru mono); 55: "The one who extracts souls" (魂ヲ引キ抜ク者, Tamashii hikinuku mono)
Aiolia manages to defeat Iapetos using all of his power. The Titan regains his senses, but decides to die in his planet to stay with the remains of his wife. Before dying, Iapetos gives his divine blood to Aiolia to heal him. Aiolia and Shaka return to the other Gold Saints, but they are soon confronted by Kreios. Shura stays behind to fight Kreios, who is using all of his power this time. Meanwhile, Titaness Rhea creates a giant salamander to attack the Gold Saints, causing Camus to face it.
14	May 20, 2008	978-4-253-23128-2; ISBN 978-4-253-18171-6 (limited edition)
Gaiden 14: "Those who cross swords" (斬リ結ブ者, Kiri musubu mono); 56: "The one who inherits the technique" (業ヲ受ケ継グ者, Waza o uketsugu mono); 57: "The one who understands everything" (全テヲ悟リシ者, Subete o satorishi mono); 58: "The one who is dead as a warrior" (闘士トシテ死ンダ者, Tōshi toshite shinda mono); 59: "The one who gives something important" (大切ナ事ヲ与エル者, Taisetsu na koto o ataeru mono)
Shura manages to perform his Excalibur technique twice at the same time, cutting Kreios's right arm. Pontos then starts draining Kreios's energy to revive his true mistress, Gaia, but Kreios decides to give his power to Shura instead. Meanwhile, Koios has a rematch with Aiolia and this time he is able to use all his power. Koios creates a giant black star that increases his speed and absorbs all of Aiolia's regular lightning attacks, including the Photon Burst. Aiolia is overpowered, but before he is defeated, he once again tries to perform the Photon Burst.
15	August 20, 2008	978-4-253-23129-9; ISBN 978-4-253-18172-3 (limited edition)
Gaiden 15: "The one who surpasses limits" (限界ヲ越エル者, Genkai o koeru mono); 60: "The one who stands up alone" (一人デ立ツ者, Hitotsu de tatsu mono); 61: "The one who transmits feelings" (想イヲ伝エル者, Omoi o tsutaeru mono); 62: "The one who is called by the evil water" (禍キ水ニ呼バレタ者, Kaki mizu ni yobareta mono); 63: "The one who burns in black flames" (黒ク燃立ツ者, Kuroku moetatsu mono)
Aiolia succeeds in awakening his seventh sense and defeats Koios, who reveals to the Gold Saints that Pontos and Mnemosyne are manipulating the Titans. Meanwhile, Camus stops the Salamander and realizes that something must have happened to its summoner. Sensing Koios's Dunamis in the final moments of his life, Hyperion confronts the traitorous Mnemosyne. She unlocks his memories and, along with Pontos, reveals to him that he had been sealed with the Egyptian god Apophis and that Pontos had saved him with his divine blood. He also learns that many of the Titans had been traitors in the past Titanomachy. Hyperion then sets out to challenge the Gold Saints. Elsewhere in the Time Labyrinth, Lithos finds an amnesiac Kronos and convinces him to try to escape with her.
16	January 20, 2009	978-4-253-23130-5; ISBN 978-4-253-18174-7 (limited edition)
Gaiden 16: "The one who stands in the black smoke" (黒煙ニ立ツ者, Kurokemuri ni tatsu mono); 64: "The one who carries infinity" (無限ヲ背負ウ者, Mugen o seō mono); 65: "The one who carries destruction" (破壊ヲ背負ウ者, Hakai o seō mono); 66: "The one gifted with the sound of the gods" (神鳴リヲ授カリシ者, Shinnari o sasukarishi mono); 67: "The one who stays until the end" (最後ニ残リシ者, Saigo ni nokorishi mono); 68: "The one who does not return the spirit" (心通ワヌ者, Kokoro kayowanu mono)
The battle between Aiolia and Hyperion continues. Both unleash their fiercest attacks and one of Aiolia's arms is turned to cinders by the flames at Hyperion's command. In the end, Aiolia manages to restore that arm with the Titan's own regenerative power and kills Hyperion. Meanwhile, Lithos and Kronos run across a strange statue during their escape. It is the Titaness Rhea who has been mysteriously petrified. As they reach a dead-end afterwards, an unknown man who calls himself their hope appears. He creates a path of levitating stones that will lead them down from the castle.
17	June 19, 2009	978-4-253-23134-3; ISBN 978-4-253-18175-4 (limited edition)
Gaiden 17: "Those who have a conversation" (相見エル者, Aimamieru mono); 69: "The one who obeys the dark water" (黒キ水ニ従ウ者, Kuroki mizu ni shitagau mono); 70: "The one of the black flames" (黒炎ノ者, Kurohonō no mono); 71: "The one who never parts" (決シテ離サヌ者, Kesshite hanasanu mono); 72: "The one who bestows light" (光ヲ与エル者, Hikari o ataeru mono); 73: "The one who takes back darkness" (闇ヲ取リ戻セシ者, Yami o torimodoseshi mono)
With Hyperion defeated, Pontos appears before the Gold Saints. He revives the fallen Titan thanks to their shared Dunamis and commands him to continue to fight. Hyperion, however, manages to break free of Pontos's control and deals himself a mortal blow that injures Pontos as well. He then ends the battle with Aiolia and dies asking the Leo Saint to protect his King and his people. At this moment, rocks start falling from the sky and Lithos and Aiolia are reunited. Kronos also joins them. Black hands surge up from Tartarus to take the amnesiac Titan King, but the Gold Saints join forces to save him. Just as they declare the war to be over, Mnemosyne liberates Kronos's memories, following the instructions of Pontos and of the mysterious man who had previously helped Lithos escape. The Titan King regains his memories and dons his armor, the Megas Drepanon, to fight the Gold Saints.
18	August 19, 2011	978-4-253-23135-0
Gaiden 18: "The one who falls from heaven" (堕天セシ者, Daten seshi mono); 74: "The one who reaps lives" (命ヲ刈リ取ル者, Inochi o karitoru mono); 75: "The one who is tied by bonds" (絆結ビシ者, Kizuna musubishi mono); 76: "The one who stands in the mist" (霧ノ中ニ立ツ者, Kiri no naka ni tatsu mono); 77: "The one who has the power of his companions" (同胞ノ力ト共ニ在ル者, Dōhō no chikara to tomoni aru mono); 78: "Those who stand to protect the god" (大神ヲ守護シ立ツ者, Ookami o shugo shi tatsu mono) (Note: Originally titled "Kudakenu tate tonari kirisaku ken tonaru mono" (砕ケヌ盾トナリ 切リ裂ク剣トナル者; lit. "Those who become unbreakable shield and cutting sword") in Champion Red, May 2011); 79: "The one who asks for help to snatch the light" (光ニ救イヲ求メ奪ウシカ無イ者, Hikari ni sukui o motome ubaushika nai mono) (Note: Originally titled "Kesshite yuruganu mono" (決シテ揺ルガヌ者; lit. "Those who never waver") in Champion Red, June 2011)
Bound by his promise to Hyperion to protect the King of the Titans, Aiolia engages Kronos in battle with the help of the other Gold Saints. Kronos's power has reverted the flow of time on Earth, which will eventually result in its destruction, and Miko Hasegawa, Lizard Misty and Lynx Retsu investigate the strange phenomena that are occurring in Egypt. In the Time Labyrinth, the Titan King unleashes his guardian stars, the last three Giants. He accuses the Saints of believing in the false peace promoted by Zeus and Athena and offers Lithos a chance to join his side. She refuses and he restates his intentions to destroy the world and wage war on Zeus.
19	December 20, 2011	978-4-253-23136-7
Gaiden 19: "The one who does not recognize the impossible" (不可能ヲ認メヌ者, Fukanou o mitomenu mono); 80: "Those who become unbreakable shield and cutting sword" (砕ケヌ盾トナリ 切リ裂ク剣トナル者, Kudakenu tate tonari kirisaku ken tonaru mono); 81: "Those who never waver" (決シテ揺ルガヌ者, Kesshite yuruganu mono); 82: "Those who stand before a legend" (伝説ト成ル存在ノ前ニ立ツ者, Densetsu to naru sonzai no mae ni tatsu mono); 83: "The one who holds a true blade" (真ナル刃ヲ持ツ者, Shin naru ha o motsu mono)
The Gold Saints split up into teams of two to face the Giants: Aldebaran and Shura defeat Nefritis Hoplisma; Shaka defeats Elektron Ther while Aiolia saves his strength for Kronos; Milo and Camus eliminate Margarites Drakon. Seeing the fall of his guards, the Titan King shatters the giant hourglass that controls time, the Adamas Psammos, and changes his armor into a new, stronger form. Empowered by the words of support of his friends, Aiolia resumes his battle against Kronos.
20	August 8, 2013	978-4-253-23140-4
Gaiden 20: "The one who brandishes his fist" (拳ヲ振リ翳ス者, Ken o furikazasu mono); 84: "The one of the hidden potential" (可能性ヲ秘メシ者, Kanōsei o himeshi mono); 85: "The one who protects the gates" (門ヲ守護セシ者, Mon o shugoseshi mono); 86: "The one who opposes a god" (神二抗エシ者, Kami ni aragaeshi mono); Final chapter: "The golden boy" (黄金の少年, Ōgon no shōnen)
Overwhelmed by Kronos's might and speed, Aiolia begins to despair, until he finally discovers a way to attack Kronos. He asks his fellow Gold Saints to leave the Labyrinth with the Titans' human followers, and, remembering his promise to Hyperion, offers Kronos a choice: to either return to Earth with him or to die alongside him. The Titan King chooses the latter and they each unleash their ultimate attacks. Both fall, but Kronos soon recognises Aiolia's determination and regrets his decision. He makes a deal with Hades, who had witnessed the battle, offering his power in exchange for Aiolia's life. With Kronos dead, mankind is saved. On Earth, Deathmask orders the Titans' human followers to don the Black Cloths. Aiolia awakens before his brother's grave, where he is reunited with Lithos and Galan. Elsewhere, Pontos is disappointed that his plan to gain Kronos's power has failed, but swears that the peace the Saints have won is only temporary.

=== Saint Seiya Episode.G: Assassin ===
No.	Japanese release date	Japanese ISBN
1	October 20, 2014	978-4-253-23531-0
1: "The assassin of assassins" (暗殺者の暗殺者, Ansatsusha no ansatsusha); 2: "A treacherous devil sword" (裏切りの魔剣, Uragiri no maken); 3: "The war of swords" (聖剣戦争, Seiken sensō)
2	February 20, 2015	978-4-253-23532-7
4: "Silver cord" (銀の糸, Gin no ito)); 5: "Nebula Storm" (星雲乃嵐, Nebyura Sutōmu); 6: "Roland" (ローラン, Rōran); 7: "Immortal sword" (不滅乃剣, Fumetsu no ken); 8: "Mad sword" (狂エル剣, Kyōeru ken); 9: "The devilish swordsman" (剣鬼, Kenki); 10: "Foresight" (予見, Yoken); 11: "Abandonment" (見切り, Mikiri)
3	May 20, 2015	978-4-253-23533-4
12: "Debt" (貸し, Kashi); 13: "Alice" (アリス, Arisu); 14: "Dragon" (龍, Ryū); 15: "Sacred treasure" (神器, Jingi); 16: "Spear" (槍, Yari); 17: "The dragon crest" (龍紋, Ryū mon); 18: "Libra" (天秤座, Tenbinza); 19: "The heroes of tomorrow" (明日の勇者, Ashita no yūsha)
4	August 20, 2015	978-4-253-23534-1
20: "Proof" (証明, Shōmei); 21: "The land of the future" (未来の地上, Mirai no chijō); 22: "Golden wings" (黄金の翼, Ōgon no tsubasa); 23: "Wadatsumi" (ワダツミ, Wadatsumi); 24: "The sea god" (海神, Kaishin); 25: "Downburst" (ダウンバースト, Daunbāsuto); 26: "Clash" (激突, Gekitotsu); 27: "Aquarius" (アクエリアス, Akueriasu) (Note: Originally titled "Mizuumi no ōjo" (湖の王女; lit. "The princess of the lake") in Champion Cross, May 26, 2015)
5	October 20, 2015	978-4-253-23535-8
28: "The princess of the lake" (湖の王女, Mizuumi no ōjo) (Note: Originally titled "Akueriasu" (アクエリアス; lit. "Aquarius") in Champion Cross, June 2, 2015); 29: "Yearning" (憧れ, Akogare); 30: "Transcendence" (超越, Chōetsu); 31: "Fetters" (枷, Kase); 32: "Poison" (毒, Doku); 33: "Jet black" (漆黒, Shikkoku); 34: "Rebel?" (反逆者?, Hangyakusha?); 35: "Tomoe" (巴, Tomoe)
6	March 18, 2016	978-4-253-23536-5
36: "The lost saint" (失われし聖闘士, Ushinawareshi seinto); 37: "Healer" (治癒者, Chiyusha); 38: "Archeus" (アルケウス, Arukeusu); 39: "The dragon god" (神龍, Shinryū); 40: "Saint Seiya" (聖闘士星矢, Seinto Seiya); 41: "Hero" (勇者, Yūsha); 42: "Strike of revival" (蘇生打撃, Sosei dageki); 43: "Athena" (アテナ, Atena)
7	June 8, 2016	978-4-253-23537-2
44: "Azoth" (Azoth) (Note: Originally titled "Bureiku" (ブレイク; lit. "Break") in Champion Cross, December 22, 2015); 45: "Return" (おかえり, Okaeri) (Note: Originally titled "Ōgon no koku" (黄金の刻; lit. "The golden moment") in Champion Cross, January 12, 2016); 46: "Aiolos" (アイオロス, Aiorosu) (Note: Originally titled "Nīsan" (兄さん; lit. "Brother") in Champion Cross, January 19, 2016); 47: "Ultimate lightning" (イカヅチノキワミ, Ikadzuchi no kiwami) (Note: Originally titled "Teriosu" (テリオス; lit. "Telios") in Champion Cross, January 26, 2016); 48: "The Pope" (教皇, Kyōkō); 49: "Will-o'-the-wisp" (鬼火, Onibi); 50: "Deathmask" (デスマスク, Desumasuku); Bonus chapter (番外編, Bangai hen)
8	September 20, 2016	978-4-253-23538-9
51: "A beast with bared fangs" (牙むく獣, Kiba muku kemono); 52: "Mighty power" (強き力, Tsuyoki chikara); 53: "Strong arm" (剛腕, Gōwan); 54: "Circular sword" (円剣, En ken); 55: "Holy king" (聖王, Seiō); 56: "Windstorm" (暴風, Bōfū); 57: "Astral armour" (幽体乃鎧, Yūtai no kai) (Note: Originally titled "Asutoraru āmā" (アストラルアーマー; lit. "Astral armour") in Champion Cross, June 7, 2016); Bonus chapter (番外編, Bangai hen)
9	December 20, 2016	978-4-253-23539-6
58: "Demon sword" (妖刀, Yōtō); 59: "Succession" (継承, Keishō); 60: "The strongest apprentice" (最強の弟子, Saikyō no deshi); 61: "Sharp sword" (業物, Wazamono); 62: "Deadly hit" (一撃必殺, Ichigeki hissatsu); 63: "Shadow of hades" (冥界乃影, Meikai no kage); 64: "Demon" (鬼, Oni)
10	June 20, 2017	978-4-253-23540-2
65: "Deathtoll" (デストール, Desutōru) (Note: Originally titled "Kibō" (希望; lit. "Hope") in Champion Cross, November 22, 2016); 66: "Trump card" (取っておき, Totteoki); 67: "Hexagram" (ヘキサグラム, Hekisaguramu) (Note: Originally titled "Meiyū" (盟友; lit. "Sworn friend") in Champion Cross, January 10, 2017); 68: "Something to believe in" (信じるもの, Shinjiru mono); 69: "Taurus" (タウラス, Taurasu) (Note: Originally titled "Soba" (そば; lit. "Soba") in Champion Cross, February 21, 2017); 70: "Spare" (スペア, Supea); 71: "Worst-case scenario" (最悪の事態, Saiaku no jitai); Bonus chapter (番外編, Bangai hen)
11	December 20, 2017	978-4-253-23836-6
72: "Three generations of masters and students" (師弟三代, Shitei sandai); 73: "Meteor" (メテオ, Meteo); 74: "Breaking point" (一点突破, Itten toppa); 75: "Arthur" (アーサー, Āsā); 76: "Recovery" (奪還, Takkan); 77: "To never fall back" (決して引かぬ, Kesshite hikanu); 78: "Dark hand" (暗手, Kura te); 79: "Zeus" (ゼウス, Zeusu)
12	May 8, 2018	978-4-253-23836-6
80: "The chosen one" (選ばれし者, Erabareshi mono); 81: "Brothers" (兄と弟, Ani to otōto); 82: "Taurus" (牡牛座, Oushiza); 83: "Greatest horn" (偉大なる牙, Idai naru kiba); 84: "The true lord" (真なる王, Shin naru ō); 85: "Recall" (召還, Shōkan); 86: "Gravitational wave" (重力振, Jūryoku ha)
13	December 20, 2018	978-4-253-23838-0
87: "Abyss" (深淵, Shin'en); 88: "Ghost" (鬼宿, Oniyado); 89: "Thawing" (氷解, Hyōkai); 90: "My master" (我が師, Waga shi); 91: "The meaning to exist" (存在意義, Sonzai igi); 92: "One with two people" (二人で一つ, Futari de hitotsu); 93: "Ohm" (オーム, Ōm)
14	January 18, 2019	978-4-253-23839-7
94: "Collapse" (崩壊, Hōkai); 95: "Divine sword" (神剣, Shinken); 96: "The vessel of the great god" (大神乃器, Ōkami no utsuwa); 97: "The future of destruction" (滅びの未来, Horobi no mirai); 98: "Black sea" (黒い海, Kuroi umi); 99: "Demon" (鬼, Oni); 100: "Authentic cloth" (真・聖衣, Shin kurosu); 101: "The limit of infinity" (無間乃果テ, Mugen no hate); 102: "Ninth sense" (第九感覚, Daiku kankaku)
15	April 19, 2019	978-4-253-23840-3
103: "Absolute emptiness" (絶対虚無, Zettai kyomu); 104: "Exclusion" (排除, Haijo); 105: "Chaos" (混沌, Konton); 106: "Collapse" (崩壊, Hōkai); 107: "Hope and light" (希望と光明, Kibō to kōmyō); 108: "Amaterasu" (アマテラス, Amaterasu); 109: "Absolutely inviolable" (絶対不可侵, Zettai fukashin); 110: "Special" (特別, Tokubetsu); "Special chapter: Introduction" (特別編 前編, Tokubetsu hen - Zenpen); "Special chapter: Conclusion" (特別編 後編, Tokubetsu hen - Kōhen)
16	December 20, 2019	978-4-253-23841-0
111: "Gate" (門, Mon); 112: "Heroes of tomorrow" (明日乃勇者, Ashita no yūshu); 113: "Kodama" (谺（コダマ）, Kodama); 114: "The extent of sacrifice" (どれ程の犠牲, Dorehodo no gisei); 115: "Severance of 'karma'" (「因果」を断つ, Inga o tatsu); 116: "Divine punishment" (神罰, Shinbotsu); 117: "Drawing of the divine sword" (神剣抜刀, Shinken battou); 118: "A Saint's duty" (聖闘士の責任, Seinto no sekinin)

=== Saint Seiya Episode.G: Requiem ===
No.	Japanese release date	Japanese ISBN
1	April 20, 2020	978-4-253-23861-8
1: "Return home" (帰還, Kikan); 2: "Capitulation" (陥落, Kanraku); 3: "The last of the Saints" (最後の聖闘士, Saigo no Seinto); 4: "The Pegasus Cloth" (天馬星座の聖衣, Pegasasu no Kurosu); 5: "Unicorn" (ユニコーン, Yunikōn); 6: "The evil armours" (悪衣, Akui); 7: "The great god's cosmo" (大神乃小宇宙, Ōkami no kosumo)
2	October 20, 2021	978-4-253-23862-5
8: "Purging hellfire" (白羊宮, Hakuyoukyū); 9: "The deterioration of Sanctuary" (聖域改悪, Seiiki kaiaku); 10: "Wedge" (楔, Kusabi); 11: "Wedge of the present world" (鉄槌, Tettsui); 12: "Awareness of social class" (黒海の野望, Kokkai no yabō); 13: "Class consciousness" (階級意識, Kaikyū ishiki); 14: "The golden bull" (金牛, Kingyū)
3	March 17, 2022	978-4-253-23863-2
15: "Starting point" (大いなる謀, Ōinaru hakarigoto); 16: "Assassin" (起点, Kiten); 17: "Super light speed" (暗殺者, Ansatsusha); 18: "King of the holy sword" (超光速度, Chō kōsokudo); 19: "Tenth "sense"" (聖剣を統べる王, Seiken o suberu ō); 20: "Bloodline" (第「十」感覚, Dai `jū' kankaku); 21: "Mitsumasa Kido" (血脈, Kechimyaku)
4	September 20, 2022	978-4-253-23864-9
22: "Doubt" (疑念, Ginen); 23: "Hope" and "Despair" (「希望」そして「絶望」, `Kibō' soshite `zetsubō'); 24: "God-killing factor" (神殺しの因子, Kamigoroshi no inshi); 25: "Divine purge" (神乃粛清, Kami no shukusei); 26: "Wedge of the earth" (大地の楔, Daichi no kusabi); 27: "Synapse" (シナプス, Shinapusu); 28: "Gathering Souls" (集う魂, Tsudou tamashī); 29: "Golden Star" (黄金乃星, Ōgon noboshi)
5	April 20, 2023	978-4-253-23865-6
30: "Gambling" (博戯, Bakugi); 31: "Phoenix" (鳳凰, Hōō); 32: "Death Queen" (デスクイーン島); 33: "Observer" (見張る, Miharu); 34: "Super Vibration Wave" (超振動波, Chō shindō ha); 35: "True Hell" (真の地獄, Shin no jigoku); 36: "Dark Deep Sea" (暗く深き海, Kuraku fukaki umi); 37: "Athena, goddess of war" (戦神アテナ, Senshin Atena)
6	March 18, 2024	978-4-253-23866-3
38: "Sweet Choice" (甘美なる選択, Kanbinaru sentaku); 39: "Evaporation" (蒸発, Jōhatsu); 40: "Dark Saints" (暗黒聖闘士, Ankoku Seinto); 41: "Black Zodiac" (漆黒乃十二星座, Shikkoku jūniseiza); 42: "Golden Fangs" (黄金乃牙, Ōgon no kiba); 43: "Replica" (レプリカ, Repurika); 44: "Manifestation of Divinity" (神格具現, Shinkaku gugen); 45: "Exavolt" (エクサボルト, Ekusaboruto)
7	March 18, 2025	978-4-253-23867-0
46: "Photon Burst" (光子破裂, Foton Bāsuto); 47: "God's Work" (神の御業, Kami no Miwaza); 48: "The Bonds of Steel" (鋼乃絆, Hagane no Kizuna); 49: "Phoenix's Fate" (不死鳥の定め, Fushichō no Sadame); 50: "The Earth Mother Goddess Descends" (大地母神降臨, Daichi Boshin Kōrin); 51: "Belief in Oneself" (己を信じる心, Onore o Shinjiru Kokoro); 52: "The Eyes of God" (逼る神の目, Semaru Kami no me); 53: "The Cause of Life" (命の大義, Inochi no Taigi)
8	August 20, 2025	978-4-253-23868-7
54: "The Powerful Male God" (男神強臨, Dankami Kyōrin); 55: "A Falling Meteorite" (降り堕ちる流星, Furi Ochiru Ryūsei); 56: "Manifest Chaos" (顕われる混沌, Arawa Wareru Konton); 57: "Holy Shield of the War Goddess" (戦女神の聖盾, Sen Megami no Hijiri Tate); 58: "Destruction Counterattack" (破滅乃逆襲, Hametsu no Gyakushū); 59: "Athena's Way" (戦女神(アテナ)の在り方, Atena no Arikata); 60: "Golden Scales" (黄金の天秤, Ogon no Tenbin); 61: "Sacred Sword Unsheathing" (神剣抜刃, Shinken Batsujin)
9	February 19, 2026	978-4-253-01160-0
62: "The Image of God in the Mind" (心に映る神の御姿, Wa Kokoro ni Utsuru Kami no Osugata); 63: "Blue Glow, Hyōga" (青き光明、氷河, Aoki Kōmyō, Hyōga); 64: "The Moment of Melting" (氷解の刻, Hyōkai no Koku); 65: "The Truth of the World" (世界の真実, Sekai no Shinjitsu); 66: "Hades Sword Wedge" (冥王剣乃楔, Meiō Ken'no Kusabi); 67: "Flame - Once More -" (炎よ――今一度――, Honō yo ―― imaichido ――); 68: "Shun's Response" (瞬の手応え, Shun no Tegotae); 69: "Shun!!! Look at Me!!!" (瞬ッ！！！ 俺を見ろッ！！！, Shun!!! Ore o Miro!!!)

==== Chapters not yet in tankōbon format ====
- Special chapter
- 70: "Nebula Power Outage" (星雲光輛, Seun Kōryō)
- 71: "Nebula Chains Rise" (星雲乃鎖 浮上, Seiun no Kusari Fujō)
