= List of Saint Seiya Episode.G characters =

A poster from Champion Red showing the Gold Saints as they appear in Episode.G

The Saint Seiya Episode.G manga features a large number of fictional characters, both created by its author, Megumu Okada, and by Masami Kurumada, author of the original Saint Seiya universe in which the story takes place. Episode.G acts as a prequel to Kurumada's work and it is set seven years before the events of the first manga, in a fictional universe where the Greek gods cyclically reincarnate into the world to wage war on each other for dominance. Okada takes characters who had played only a supporting role in the original series and puts them in the position of protagonists. The old main characters appear only briefly, in flashforwards of the future.

The protagonists of the story are the Gold Saints, an elite group of twelve warriors devoted to the goddess Athena, whose duty is to protect the Earth from evil and maintain peace and justice. Among them, Leo Aiolia plays the role of main character. The antagonists are the twelve Titans and the primordial god Pontos, a group of ancient gods who escaped from the prison of Tartarus, where they had been confined in since the mythological era. They seek to overthrow the Olympian gods and regain control of the Earth. The Titans are led by Kronos, father of the leader of the Olympian gods, Zeus, and are assisted by an army of Giants and other evil creatures.

Several merchandise items depicting the main characters of Episode.G have been released with the limited edition volumes. The sharp differences and similarities between Okada's characters and Kurumada's, however, have been a target of both criticism and praise among critics.

== Creation and conception ==
Most of the protagonists were originally created by Masami Kurumada, who introduced them in his 1986 manga Saint Seiya as supporting characters and, at one point, antagonists. In the first volume of Episode.G, author Megumu Okada has commented that his intention was to write a prequel to the original story and critics have noted that he has done a good job in making the characters his own while staying true to their original concept. Okada adopted the colour schemes of either the original manga or its anime adaptation and used the same fighting techniques and mottoes that identified each character in Kurumada's manga. The story has many dialogues and situations that refer to the original manga. At the same time, Okada adds to their back-stories and renovates designs according to his personal drawing style. Characters appear more stylised, "anorexic and androgynous" in the words of Manga-News's critic, and are drawn with enhanced details, especially on clothing and armours. Entire scenes have been taken directly from Kurumada's work and replicated in Episode.G, with the only change being the drawing style.

The antagonists of Episode.G appear in the Saint Seiya franchise for the first time in this manga. Most are based on Greek mythology, but it is also possible to find a few characters inspired by Egyptian mythology. Some of the supporting characters also appear solely in this manga, while others, especially among the Silver Saints, were previously established in the Saint Seiya universe by Kurumada.

== Protagonists ==
The protagonists of Saint Seiya Episode.G are Athena's Saints. Devoted to the goddess Athena (女神（アテナ）, Atena), they are sworn to defend the Earth from danger and the influence of evil gods. Although Athena's Saints are only human, their use of Cosmo (小宇宙（コスモ）, Kosumo) – the energy of the Big Bang that remains inside every being – gives them superhuman strength and allows them to perform formidable feats. It is said that their fists can rend the sky and their kicks can split the earth. Since their bodies are still as frail as any ordinary man's, however, Athena gifts her Saints with protective armours called Cloths (聖衣（クロス）, Kurosu) which are linked to the constellations. As such, Saints are usually referred to by their guardian constellation and their given name.

There are eighty-eight Saints in total, as many as the constellations, and they are divided into three hierarchic categories according to power: the lowest-ranked are the Bronze Saints, followed by the Silver Saints, then the twelve elite Gold Saints. Cloths also reflect this classification system, being usually divided into Bronze, Silver and Gold Cloths, the latter being the most effective and durable. The home and training ground of the Saints is the Sanctuary (聖域（サンクチュアリ, Sankuchuari), an isolated location in Athens, Greece, that only Saints, apprentices and their servants have access to. Their leader is the representative of the goddess Athena, the Pope (教皇, Kyōkō).

The concept of the Saints, as well as most of the characters that make up their ranks, was first created by Masami Kurumada. In this manga, it was expanded upon by Megumu Okada to include new characters and develop aspects related to the organisation of Sanctuary that had been left undefined in Saint Seiya.

=== Gold Saints ===
The Gold Saints (黄金聖闘士（ゴールド・セイント）, Gōrudo Seinto) are the main protagonists of Episode.G. They possess full mastery of their Cosmo through their "seventh sense" (セブンセンシズ, Sebun Senshizu) and as such can move at the speed of light. They are the mightiest of Athena's Saints and guardians of the Golden Zodiac (黄金十二宮（ゴールド・ゾディアック）, Gōrudo Zodiakku), the series of twelve temples that defends the Pope's chambers and the massive statue of Athena overlooking Sanctuary. Their constellations are those situated over the ecliptic, the twelve constellations of the zodiac.

==== Leo Aiolia ====
Leo Aiolia (獅子座（レオ）のアイオリア, Reo no Aioria) is the main character of Episode.G. He is the thirteen-year-old Gold Saint of Leo and the younger brother of Sagittarius Aiolos. He was first created by Masami Kurumada and is voiced by Hiro Shimono in the released Drama CDs.

Despite being a natural blond, Aiolia dyes his hair red to distance himself from his brother, whom most of Sanctuary believes to be a traitor. However, it is made evident that even though he resents his brother and suffers immensely because of him, he still loves him very much. This conflict is behind the grudge he holds against the rest of the Gold Saints and it often drives him to fight them and challenge the Pope's commands. Aiolia holds his loved ones close to his heart, particularly his servants Lithos and Galan, whom he considers to be family. As taught by John Black, he proudly fights, not for himself, but to protect everyone and everything he holds dear.

His fierce personality, Cosmo and battle skills attract the attention of Pontos, who acknowledges him as a potential menace to his plans, and Hyperion, whom he encounters during the Titan's first invasion of Sanctuary. They refer to the Leo Saint as the "man of the Evil Omen" and Kronos prophesies that he will be the one to release him from Zeus's seal.

At one point, Aiolia is assigned to protect Shaka while the Virgo Saint enters a deep meditation to banish the evil monsters that the Titans' presence on Earth had called forth. He then faces Koios for the first time. Overwhelmed by the Titan's power, the memory of his brother offers Aiolia the encouragement and strength he needed to unleash the "Photon Burst", an attack Aiolos had once advised him to never use. With it, he defeats Koios and would have destroyed him if not for Hyperion's intervention. Aiolia dedicates the technique to his brother, saying that he created it to protect him.

Aiolia shows his mettle again while fighting Kronos, the Titan King, the second time the Titans invade Sanctuary. He professes his belief that humanity is not worthless and that the Titans have no right to interfere with their lives. Severely wounded, he strikes Kronos with his "Photon Burst". The Titanesses, however, keep the attack from annihilating their King and Kronos is freed. Kronos comes out of the fight with no idea of who he is and the other Titans, believing this is due to Aiolia's attack, lay down a plan to lure the Saint into the Time Labyrinth to restore their King's memory. After Iapetos kidnaps Lithos, Aiolia does not hesitate to follow him into the Titans' domain, where he battles not just Iapetos and Themis a second time, but also Pontos, Koios (who entrusts him the god-slaying power "Keraunos"), Hyperion and a restored Kronos.

Although the original series does not mention any peculiarity about Aiolia's Cosmo, in Episode.G it is portrayed as electrical in nature. His fighting techniques therefore involve electricity in some manner. They are: the single-hit "Lightning Bolt" (雷光電撃（ライトニング・ボルト）, Raitoningu Boruto), the multiple-hit "Lightning Plasma" (雷光放電（ライトニング・プラズマ）, Raitoningu Purazuma), the multidirectional "Lightning Fang" (雷光電牙（ライトニング・ファング）, Raitoningu Fangu), and the ultimate "Photon Burst" (光子破裂（フォトン・バースト）, Foton Bāsuto). The first two were introduced in Kurumada's Saint Seiya, while the last two are exclusive to Okada's Episode.G.

==== Aries Mu ====
Aries Mu (牡羊座（アリエス）のムウ, Ariesu no Mū) is a Gold Saint who lives in Jamir, Tibet, and the only person in the world who can repair damaged Cloths. His character was first created by Masami Kurumada, but Okada adopts the colour scheme present in the Saint Seiya anime, switching Mu's original long blond hair to lilac. He has two dots in the place of his eyebrows.

He is a descendant of the people of the Lost Continent of Mu and possesses his ancestors' distinctive trait: a powerful psychokinetic ability which allows him to restrain his enemies and teleport himself and others. He is a pacifist, but also a fierce warrior. The "Stardust Revolution" (星屑革命（スターダスト・レボリューション）, Sutādasuto Reboryūshon) technique he inherited from his master, the former Pope Aries Shion, is so powerful that it can destroy a Hecatonchire in one strike. His other fighting techniques are the "Crystal Wall" (結晶障壁（クリスタル・ウォール）, Kurisutaru Wōru) and the "Starlight Extinction" (星明識延（スターライト・エクスティンクション）, Sutāraito Ekusutinkushon), all of which were designed by Kurumada.

Mu battles Dimension Iapetos in Jamir and repairs Aiolia's Cloth in the aftermath of the first invasion of Sanctuary. Later, he aids the Leo Saint again, by teleporting the Virgo, Scorpio, Taurus, Aquarius and Capricorn Saints into the Time Labyrinth to fight the Titans.

==== Taurus Aldebaran ====
Taurus Aldebaran (牡牛座（タウラス）のアルデバラン, Taurasu no Arudebaran) is depicted as a friendly, punctual person who enjoys life and likes to buy little souvenirs. He dislikes saying bad things behind anyone else's backs and never hesitates to help a companion.

He was prepared to sacrifice himself so that the Leo Cloth, broken by Hyperion, could be repaired, but it proved unnecessary, as Mu used his own blood. He remains in Jamir while Mu recovers, until the Titans attack Sanctuary. His strong beliefs and ability to learn from past mistakes allow him to defeat Themis's "Brabeus Talanton", which was smashing Aiolia and Shura under the weight of their sins. Later, he steps forth to help Aiolia once more, answering Mu's call to go fight the Titans at the Time Labyrinth.

This character was first created by Masami Kurumada. Megumu Okada stays true to that design's colour scheme, making Aldebaran a blond. Like in the original manga, he has only one fighting technique: the "Great Horn" (威風激穿（グレート・ホーン）, Gurēto Hōn).

==== Gemini Saga ====
Gemini Saga (双子座（ジェミニ）のサガ, Jemini no Saga) is both a protagonist and one of the central antagonists. He is responsible for many tragedies that have plagued Sanctuary. This information, however, remains undisclosed to most who follow him.

Saga was once a kind and honourable Gold Saint, but an evil presence lurks within him that only his twin brother Kanon knew of. After Kanon confronts him about this and reveals to him his dark intentions of taking over Sanctuary, Saga declares his brother to be pure evil and locks him in Cape Sounion, in a watery prison designed to contain Athena's enemies. Some time later, however, evil finally consumes him and Saga murders Pope Shion. He then starts impersonating Shion and controlling Sanctuary to further his ambitions. To hide his true identity, he wears a helmet that obscures his face at all times.

He conspires with Kronos and Pontos, and the Titan King gives him a golden dagger that has the power to kill gods. Saga uses it to attempt to kill the infant Athena, but Aiolos interrupts him and saves her. As a result, Saga declares Aiolos a traitor to Sanctuary.

He is a morally complex character. As in Saint Seiya, there are two sides to his personality that often argue. After Kronos arrives at Sanctuary to reclaim the "Megas Drepanon", his evil side orders the Saints not to engage in battle. His good side, however, is unable to stand by and rises to fight the Titan. Saga uses the golden dagger Kronos had once given him, but before he can kill Kronos, his evil side takes control again.

He is capable of creating illusions and controlling his cloth from a distance to deceive an enemy. His fighting techniques are "Another Dimension" (異界次元（アナザー・ディメンション）, Anazā Dimenshon), "Galaxian Explosion" (銀河爆砕（ギャラクシアン・エクスプロージョン）, Gyarakushian Ekusupurōjon), and "Illusion Demon Emperor's Fist" (幻朧魔皇拳, Genrōmaōken), which only the Pope can use.

Saga was first created by Masami Kurumada. Okada adopts the colour scheme seen in the original manga rather than the anime's. As such, Saga has dark hair when his evil side prevails and light hair when his good side takes over. Saga also establishes a comparison between himself and the Greek god of War Ares, something which is absent from Kurumada's original work but which was suggested in the animated version.

==== Cancer Deathmask ====
Cancer Deathmask (蟹座（キャンサー）のデスマスク, Kyansā no Desumasuku) is one of the few people who know of Saga's true nature and his disguise as the Pope, yet he remains loyal to him since Saga's beliefs mirror his own. He believes firmly that power defines what is just and that only with a ruthless iron will can the world be at peace. He is proud to be evil and not afraid to admit it. Rude, cunning and violent by nature, he will not hesitate to play dirty or mercilessly kill women, children, the aged or the diseased to reach his goal. He considers each kill a trophy of his greatness and thus fills the Temple of Cancer with his victim's death masks, a practice which earned him his name. While most consider the echoes of the dead in his Temple horrifying, Deathmask finds them pleasant.

Deathmask does not care to hide his scorn towards Aiolia and his brother. As a result, the two strongly dislike each other. At one point, the two of them fight, despite it being forbidden for Gold Saints to do so. Later, during the Giants' assault on Sanctuary, he defeats Kyanos Pyrokus with his single fighting technique, the "Praesepe Underworld Waves" (積尸気冥界波, Sekishiki Meikai Ha).

Deathmask was first created by Masami Kurumada, but Megumu Okada uses the colour scheme of the anime, giving him dark blue hair instead of black.

==== Virgo Shaka ====
Virgo Shaka (乙女座（バルゴ）のシャカ, Barugo no Shaka) is a powerful Gold Saint. He has long blond hair and wears a bindi on his forehead. He was first created by Masami Kurumada.

He has a keen sense of Cosmo and uses it as a substitute for his eyes, which he keeps closed most of the time to heighten his power. Upon confronting Kyanos Pyrokus, who is then invisible, Shaka says that in this world there is nothing he cannot see. More than once, he is the first to sense some dark Cosmo at work nearby.

He recognises Aiolia's potential early on, but prefers not to make any kind of judgement on his still maturing character. Aiolia sees him as meddlesome and arrogant then, and it is not until he is assigned the task of protecting the Virgo Saint while Shaka enters a deep meditation to cleanse the world of the evil influence of the Titans and risks his life to keep Dark Lightning Koios at bay that the two start to become friends. Later, Shaka is one of the few Gold Saints who answers Mu's call and goes to help Aiolia at the Time Labyrinth. Together, they defeat Iapetos and Themis.

Unlike other Saints, his religion is Buddhism. His attacks involve Buddhist teachings, using meditation to create illusions, manipulate dimensions, nullify attacks and counter-attack. They are: "Demon Pacifier" (天魔降伏, Tenma Kōfuku), "Khan" (カーン, Kān), and "The Treasures of Heaven" (天舞宝輪, Tenbu Hōrin).

==== Libra Dohko ====
Libra Dohko (天秤座（ライブラ）の童虎, Raibura no Dōko) is the last living former-generation Saint, one of the two survivors from the previous Holy War along with Shion. Athena charged him with the secret mission to keep watch over a sealed evil and so, for the past 236 years, he has never left his post at the Five Old Peaks in Rozan, China, not even to answer the Pope's summon to an urgent meeting, the "Crusos Sunagein" (黄金結合（クリューソス・シュナゲイン）, Kuryūsosu Shunagein; Golden Assembly). When Pontos attacks Aiolia at the entrance of the Time Labyrinth, Dohko sends his Libra Cloth and creates a projection of himself to defend his fellow Saint.

Dohko was originally created by Masami Kurumada and he is one of the few characters who appears in all four manga of the Saint Seiya franchise.

==== Scorpio Milo ====
Scorpio Milo (蠍座（スコーピオン）のミロ, Sukōpion no Miro) is a close friend of Camus. He is very proud of the reputation of the Gold Saints as a group and extremely loyal to Sanctuary. Because of this, he will fulfil any mission appointed to him, even if it goes against his personal desires.

He disapproves of Aiolia's crude manner and mistrusts him greatly because of his brother's deeds and the stain they cast on the Gold Saints' reputation. Despite condemning Aiolia, however, sometimes he shows that he is just as rash and immature, like when he is caught in an argument with the Leo Saint and calls him "Stupid Cat".

He does not hesitate to fight when Sanctuary is in danger. He battles and defeats the Trojan hero Hector, whom Pontos had revived, exposing his belief that, while he respects History, the future should be written by those who live in the present. This idea is shared by Aiolia and it becomes common ground that helps to finally bring them closer. Milo is one of the Gold Saints who answers Mu's call to go help Aiolia in the Time Labyrinth – although he stubbornly refuses to acknowledge him as a friend even then. His attacks are the "Scarlet Needle" (真紅光針（スカーレット・ニードル）, Sukāretto Nīdoru) and its death blow, "Antares" (赤色巨星（アンタレス）, Antaresu).

He was created by Masami Kurumada. Megumu Okada retains the colour scheme of the original manga, having a blond Milo rather than the more popularly known blue-haired version of the anime.

==== Sagittarius Aiolos ====
Sagittarius Aiolos (射手座（サジタリアス）のアイオロス, Sajitariasu no Aiorosu) is Aiolia's older brother and a prominent figure in the story, despite having been killed six years before the start of the main part of Episode.G. He was created by Masami Kurumada. Megumu Okada further develops his personality and back-story, adopting the colour scheme of the original manga, where Aiolos is a blond. He is one of the main characters in the special "Volume 0", which is named after him.

Sagittarius is an extremely brave and righteous Saint, who has a playful personality. He fell into disgrace and was ultimately killed after keeping Saga from murdering the newly reincarnated Athena. Disguised as Pope, Saga shifts the blame onto him and orders Shura to kill him on the charge of treason. His resulting bad reputation greatly affects his younger brother.

Aiolos trained Aiolia to become a Saint and his spirit still appears from time to time to guide his little brother, despite the latter's resentment of him. He was also a friend of Galan, who eventually becomes his brother's servant. The two once had a stand-off after Galan was caught stealing Athena's holy blood. Aiolos destroyed Typhon after the monster caused a ship-wreck in 1973, and single-handedly defeated the Sun God's Army. Accompanied by a young Aiolia, he visited Egypt on orders to investigate the recently exposed tomb of the Sun God Apophis, from which a suspicious Cosmo emanated. He defeats the Sun God with his special attack, the "Infinity Break" (無限破砕（インフィニティ・ブレイク）, Infiniti Bureiku), but unknowingly frees Pontos in the process.

==== Capricorn Shura ====
Megumu Okada's Capricorn Shura (山羊座（カプリコーン）のシュラ, Kapurikōn no Shura) reconciles the previous versions of the character found in Kurumada's manga and the anime. In Episode.G, Shura is a very loyal Gold Saint, but when he uncovers the truth about Aiolos's innocence and confronts the false Pope about it, he falls under the effect of Saga's "Illusion Demon Emperor's Fist", a technique that controls the mind of its victim. Bound to Saga's will, Shura starts to follow his orders, while remaining loyal to Athena at heart.

He fights several soldiers from the Titans' army during their second assault on Sanctuary, as well as Phaios Spathe and Kreios. He helps Aiolia fight Themis at the top of Sanctuary after Kronos's release and later answers Mu's appeal to go help the Leo Saint at the Time Labyrinth. There, he has a rematch with Kreios, who acknowledges Shura's might and bequeaths him the power of his sword and Cosmo after his defeat. In battle, Shura's limbs are like sharp swords, thanks to his fighting technique "Excalibur" (聖剣抜刃（エクスカリバー）, Ekusukaribā).

==== Aquarius Camus ====
Aquarius Camus (水瓶座（アクエリアス）のカミュ, Akueriasu no Kamyu) is a stoic and honourable Saint who protects the innocent, be they soldiers of Sanctuary or common people who follow the Titans. He believes that Gold Saints should keep a cool head at all times and not get carried away to reassure those of inferior rank who look up to them in times of crisis.

He can use his Cosmo to freeze anything, from water to enemy soldiers or even a Titan's Soma. His techniques can reach the absolute zero. They are: "Diamond Dust" (極小氷晶（ダイヤモンド・ダスト）, Daiyamondo Dasuto), "Koltso" (氷輪（カリツオ）, Karitsuo; Ring), "Freezing Coffin" (氷結唐櫃（フリージング・コフィン）, Furīzingu Kofin), and "Aurora Execution" (極光処刑（オーロラ・エクスキューション）, Ōrora Ekusukyūshon).

At one point, he faces Current Okeanos. He then exposes more of his beliefs, telling the Titan that if gods like him have the right to toy with human lives, then humans should have the right to choose which gods they want to follow. He claims that gods like the Titans, who do not comprehend the value of life, are unable to truly appreciate the immortality they possess and do not deserve to be worshipped.

He allows Aiolia to enter the Time Labyrinth to save the abducted Lithos, but stays behind to freeze the entrance so that the Titans' army cannot invade the Earth. There, he asks Aiolia to have faith in his companions and trust in the rest of the Gold Saints. Later, thanks to Mu, he is able to rejoin the Leo Saint to fight.

Camus was first created by Masami Kurumada, but Megumu Okada uses the colour scheme seen in the animated version, having a teal-haired Camus, instead of a red-head like in the Saint Seiya manga. He is voiced by Hikaru Midorikawa in the Drama CDs.

==== Pisces Aphrodite ====
Pisces Aphrodite (魚座（ピスケス）のアフロディーテ, Pisukesu no Afurodīte) is a narcissistic and merciless individual. He is often seen thinking about the beauty of battle and calling victory as the greatest beauty that crowns the strongest warrior. He was first created by Masami Kurumada and is recognisable by his long light teal hair and beauty mark under the left eye.

After the Titans' gate is discovered, the Pope sends him to cover the entrance of the Time Labyrinth with his deadly roses so none may cross it. Aphrodite saves the defenceless Aiolia from the attacks of the followers of the Titans. After an argument between the two Gold Saints, since Aiolia was against Aphrodite's bloodlust, the Giant Anthrakma Zugylos appears. Aphrodite saves Aiolia from Zugylos's deadly mace and kills the Giant. He returns to Sanctuary afterwards, leaving behind a carpet of vines and roses at the exit of that world to prevent an invasion on Sanctuary.

Other than his techniques involving roses, the "Royal Demon Rose" (王魔薔薇（ロイヤル・デモン・ローズ）, Roiyaru Demon Rōzu), the "Piranhan Rose" (黒鋸薔薇（ピラニアン・ローズ）, Piranian Rōzu), and the "Bloody Rose" (紅血薔薇（ブラッディ・ローズ）, Buraddi Rōzu), Aphrodite can create and manipulate large rose vines. He uses them to restrain and strangle his targets, create massive vine blades and defensive cocoons to protect and heal himself or another through his Cosmo.

=== Silver and Bronze Saints ===
The Silver Saints (白銀聖闘士（シルバー・セイント）, Shirubā Seinto) are the second highest-ranked and the second most powerful group of Saints. They play a supporting role in the story, fighting the forces of evil in the Gold Saints' absence. Bronze Saints (青銅聖闘士（ブロンズ・セイント）, Buronzu Seinto) are the lowest-ranked group of Athena's Saints. Only one has played a significant part in the story, although the Bronze Saints of the future, the protagonists of Saint Seiya, have appeared in several brief flashforwards.

==== Eagle Marin ====
Eagle Marin (鷲星座（イーグル）の魔鈴, Īguru no Marin) is an enigmatic Japanese Silver Saint with a strong personality and a keen sense of duty, created by Masami Kurumada. She first appears after Aiolia's match against Hyperion and saves the injured Gold Saint and Lithos from soldiers who had stayed behind with her "Eagle Toe Flash" (鷲星閃光（イーグル・トゥ・フラッシユ）, Īguru Tō Furasshu) attack. Later, she fights the Giant Phoinikeos Rhuax, but Aiolia steps in to save her.

As a female Saint, she is required to cover her face with a mask, signifying that she has renounced her femininity and is equal to men. Nonetheless, during her brief appearances, it is implied that the Leo Saint has a slight crush on her.

==== Triangle Noesis ====
Triangle Noesis (三角星座（トライアングル）のノエシス, Toraianguru no Noeshisu) is a noble Silver Saint, created by Megumu Okada. He was killed when he and his apprentice Lynx Retsu encounter the gorgon Euryale. After having half of his body turned to stone while protecting Retsu, he uses his attack, "Tritos Spharaghisma" (三界封印（トリトス・スプラギスマ）, Toritosu Supuragisuma; Seal of Past, Present and Future existences), in hopes of weakening the gorgon. The rest of his body is subsequently petrified and all but his right side, where his Cosmo continued to inhabit even after death, crumbles. When Retsu later comes to kill the monster, both their Cosmos join and, with the last remnants of his soul, they defeat the gorgon.

==== Ophiuchus Shaina ====
Ophiuchus Shaina (蛇遣い星座（オピュクス）のシャイナ, Opyukusu no Shaina) is a fierce female Silver Saint, created by Masami Kurumada. She is seen fighting a sabre-toothed tiger that had been resurrected with the release of Kronos and protecting a group of researchers alongside Lynx Retsu in the middle of an Egyptian jungle. Her fighting technique is the "Thunder Claw" (雷鳴鉤爪（サンダー・クロウ）, Sandā Kurō). As all female Saints, she hides her face behind a mask to be considered equal to men.

==== Lizard Misty ====
Lizard Misty (蜥蜴星座（リザド）のミスティ, Rizado no Misuti) is a vain, but proud Silver Saint, first created by Masami Kurumada. He appears accompanied by Lynx Retsu and the archaeologist Miko Hasegawa, and is seen destroying a monster made out of the souls of the dead who no longer had a body to return to that had been brought back to Earth by Kronos's power with his special technique, the "Mavrou Trypa" (マーブル・トリパー, Māburu Toripā; Black Hole).

==== Lynx Retsu ====
Lynx Retsu (山猫座（リンクス）のレツ, Rinkusu no Retsu) is an orphan who was raised by his master, Triangle Noesis. Shortly after receiving his Bronze Lynx Cloth, he and his master go to explore a cave where a mysterious, dangerous Cosmo lurked. There, they discover a gorgon, which had been revived by the Titans' awakening. His master sacrifices himself to save him, telling Retsu to alert Sanctuary of the danger. Aiolia arrives afterwards and Retsu pleads him to let him finish the creature. To satisfy his wishes, Aiolia lies and says that he is only a messenger sent to make sure Retsu, who is assigned the task of defeating the monster, accomplishes that mission. With the help of Triangle Noesis's spirit, Retsu manages to defeat the gorgon and avenge his master with his special attack, "Fissure Hurricane" (裂爪疾風, Ressō Shippū). Retsu is later seen fighting off several evil creatures in Egypt, with the help of Ophiuchus Shaina and Lizard Misty.

This character was created by Megumu Okada and is exclusive to Episode.G.

=== Others affiliated with Athena ===
==== Lithos Chrysalis ====
Lithos Chrysalis (リトス・クリサリス, Ritosu Kurisarisu) is Aiolia's servant, who once mistook her for a boy and now sees her as his little sister. She is an innocent girl with short green hair. Her father was a sculptor who died while working on an order for Sanctuary. Haunted by what would become of his daughter, his soul possesses one of his giant stone statues. During a mission, Aiolia promises his tortured soul that he will take care of Lithos until she is able to take care of herself, thus releasing him from the emotional weight binding him to this world and allowing him to rest. After Kronos's release, Iapetos kidnaps Lithos to lure Aiolia into the Titan's realm and she befriends an amnesiac Kronos.

Lithos was created by Megumu Okada and is voiced by Chiwa Saitō in the Drama CDs.

==== Galan ====
His full name is Galarian Steiner (ガラリアン・シュタイナー, Gararian Shutainā), but he is usually called Galan (ガラン, Garan) instead. He was an old friend of Aiolos and was once a candidate for the Leo Gold Cloth.

At some point before Aiolos's death, Galan's mother falls ill and he steals Athena's sacred blood to cure her. By the time he gets to her, however, his mother is already dead. After he is caught, he is imprisoned at Cape Sounion and sentenced to fight a warrior, and so he asks his friend Aiolos to deliver that punishment. During the fight, Aiolos takes off his Gold Cloth so they can fight at the same level, but he still defeats Galan, who loses his right eye and arm and starts using a metal arm as replacement. After Aiolos's alleged betrayal, Galan stays to live with Aiolia and takes care of him even though the young Leo is also called a traitor. Aiolia thus starts to see Galan as family.

Galan was created by Megumu Okada and is voiced by Kōji Yusa in the Drama CDs.

==== Miko Hasegawa ====
Miko Hasegawa (長谷川 美子, Hasegawa Miko) is a Japanese archaeologist who specialises in ancient Egypt and speaks very bad English. She discovers some ruins that had been exposed with the completion of the Aswan Dam and proceeds to investigate them, escorted by Aiolos and Aiolia. There, they find an ancient evil sealed and are attacked by numerous monsters that had been drawn to that power, including the snake-god Apophis. The two brothers, however, easily defeat them. Miko later appears in Lizard Misty's company, having been asked by Sanctuary to investigate some strange phenomena in Egypt.

She was created by Megumu Okada and appears exclusively in Episode.G.

== Antagonists ==
The inside cover of Episode.G volume 7, displaying the protagonist, Leo Aiolia, along with most of the Titans

=== Titans ===
Children of Gaia and Uranus, the Titans (ティターン神族, Titān Shinzoku) are twelve deities that ruled the world in ancient times. They rose to power after the youngest Titan, Kronos, took arms against his tyrannical father and killed him at the urge of his mother. Cursed by Uranus to suffer the same fate, however, Kronos became a tyrant in turn and was defeated and sealed into Tartarus along with the rest of the Titans by Zeus, his son, after a battle known as the Titanomachy. Revived by Pontos and with the Time Labyrinth (刻ノ迷宮（クロノス・ラビュリントス）, Kuronosu Rabyurintosu) serving as their headquarters, the Titans seek to once more establish themselves as rulers of the Earth.

Their weapons and armours are called Somas (楚真（ソーマ）, Sōma) and their power is that of the divine Cosmo called Dunamis (デュナミス, Dyunamisu). Each Titan also possesses a planet or a star they can draw power from. The Titan King's Soma is guarded by Athena's Saints, which leads them to attack Sanctuary.

They first appear as the main antagonists of Episode.G, but some of them later help the Gold Saints, as they discover that Pontos had been manipulating them for his own ends.

==== Kronos ====
Kronos (クロノス, Kuronosu) is the youngest of the Titans and rules as their King. He is self-centred and arrogant, refusing to acknowledge any other god but himself. He is also very authoritarian and dismissive of the power of humans.

Unlike the rest of his siblings, the divine weapon gifted to him by Gaia, the scythe-like Soma called "Megas Drepanon", was sealed in a room beneath the statue of Athena in Sanctuary. Kronos himself was damned to eternal suffering, bound by Zeus's lightning, but after thousands of years, with the seals growing weak, Kronos became able to project his will to any part of Earth in the form of a giant being with six arms. Early in the story, he proclaims Aiolia to be the one destined to release him, as the Leo Saint uses lightning which is able to nullify Zeus's seal, also lightning-based. His prophecy comes to pass, but he also loses his memory. While amnesiac, Kronos befriends Lithos and follows her until they reach Aiolia. Mnemosyne then unlocks his memories and the fully restored god unleashes his evil onto the world, stopping time and engaging the Gold Saints in battle.

His special fighting techniques include: the "Teleos Oracle" (絶対神託（テレオス・オラクル）, Tereosu Orakuru; Perfect Prophecy), the "Khaos Hyetos" (渾沌豪雨（カオス・ヒュエトス）, Kaosu Hyuetosu; Rain of Chaos), the "Phainomenon Arkhein" (現象支配（パイノメノン・アルケイン）, Painomenon Arukein; Phenomenon Control), and the "Dark Rumbling" (闇乃鳴動, Yami no Meidō). He controls a giant hourglass that regulates time, the "Adamas Psammos" (金剛石乃砂（アダマス・プサンモス）, Adamasu Pusanmosu; Diamond Sands), and has three guardian planets that usually take the form of three long locks of hair. These guardians are the three most powerful Giants: Nefritis Hoplisma, Elektron Ther and Margarites Drakon.

==== Ebony Hyperion ====
The solar god Ebony Hyperion (漆黒のヒュペリオン, Shikkoku no Hyuperion) was the first Titan to be released from Tartarus. He had been sealed inside the Egyptian sun god Apophis in ancient times and it was Pontos's Ichor that had brought him back to life. He is calm and generous to his brothers and followers. He shows a merciless face, however, when fighting an opponent or when cultivating his hatred for Zeus and other enemy gods. Like his brother and close friend Koios, he strives not just to free Kronos, but also all of the humans who have followed the Titans since ancient times.

He possesses an analytical mind capable of reading through a technique he has seen only once and then developing an adequate retaliation strategy. He was also one of the first to see through Pontos and suspect his loyalty. He develops a special connection to Aiolia after their first fight, becoming something of a rival of the Gold Saint. He welcomes Aiolia into the Time Labyrinth and later reappears after his suspicions of Pontos are confirmed and he discovers that Mnemosyne has been manipulating the Titans' memories. He falls at the hands of Aiolia, to whom he entrusts his desire to protect his King and his people.

His Soma has the shape of a greatsword. Hyperion uses either his fists or his sword against his opponents. He has a black sun for a planet and can use the following techniques to attack: "Ebony Vortex" (漆黒旋風（エボニー・ボルテクス）, Ebonī Borutekusu), "Gurthang Vortex" (死剣旋風（グアサング・ボルテクス）, Guasangu Borutekusu), "Helios Vortex" (太陽旋風（ヘリオス・ボルテクス）, Heriosu Borutekusu), "Helios Prominence" (太陽紅炎（ヘリオス・プロミネンス）, Heriosu Purominensu), "Prominence Blade" (紅炎大剣（プロミネンス・ブレイド）, Purominensu Bureido), and "Ouroboros Prominence" (無限紅炎（ウロボロス・プロミネンス）, Uroborosu Purominensu). Hyperion can also manipulate the air, creating blasts of high pressure that allow him to toy with an enemy's body or deflect blasts thrown at him. He can create and manipulate lava and, taking advantage of his black sun, create afterimages of his body to confuse his enemy.

==== Dimension Iapetos ====
Dimension Iapetos (次元のイアペトス, Jigen no Iapetosu) was the second Titan to be released from Tartarus. He is the consort of Themis and the father of Prometheus and Atlas. Iapetos is quick to anger, cocky and proud of his power, which he likes to show off. He is rude and sadistic, even to his siblings. This personality, however, is at odds with the deep grief and resentment he feels over the punishment the gods of Olympus gave to his son Prometheus for sharing fire with mankind. For this reason, he despises all humans, seeing them as ingrates who have forgotten the suffering of his son.

He is incredibly strong. He leaves the fight against Mu in Jamir unscathed, without even using his full power. He later kidnaps Lithos to lure Aiolia into the Time Labyrinth and challenges the Leo Saint alongside Themis. Consumed by thoughts of revenge against mankind, he takes the life of Themis, who willingly offers it to him so he could use her power, and declares himself a devil. The two become the first Titans to be defeated, but before throwing himself into Tartarus, Themis in his embrace, Iapetos grants his Ichor to Aiolia and Shaka, to heal their wounds. At the end, Prometheus appears and carries his parents' bodies to Pontos and Gaia.

Iapetos bears the double-edged sword Soma. He has exceptional control over dimensional portals, being able to use them effectively in battle with the "Khora Temnein" (空間切断（コーラー・テムネイン）, Kōrā Temunein; Space Cut). He is also a master of the strange ink-like substance known as "Khaos" (混沌（カオス）, Kaosu), the source of the universe which he uses to conjure his most powerful attacks: "Hex Aster Xiphos" (六星乃刃（ヘクス・アステル・クシポス）, Hekusu Asuteru Kushiposu; Six Star Xiphos), "Khaos Kyklos" (混沌乃輪（カオス・キュクロス）, Kaosu Kyukurosu; Chaos Cycle), "Khaos Blade" (混沌乃刃（カオス・ブレイド）, Kaosu Bureido; Chaos Blade), and "Khaos Prosbole" (混沌衝撃（カオス・プロスボレー）, Kaosu Purosubore; Chaos Assault). His other techniques are: the "Hekatonkheir Kalein" (百手招喚（ヘカトンケイル・カレイン）, Hekatonkeiru Karein; Hecatonchire Summon) and "Melas Planetes" (闇乃惑星（メラス・プラネーテス）, Merasu Puranētesu; Black Planets).

==== Dark Lightning Koios ====
Dark Lightning Koios (黒雷のコイオス, Kokurai no Koiosu) is the third Titan Pontos released from Tartarus and Phoebe's consort. Kronos considers him his "greatest killer", but Koios is one of the gentlest Titans. He has a strong sense of loyalty, much like Hyperion, whom he is very close to. Both give great importance to releasing their human followers. While he prefers to avoid unnecessary death, he can be lethal and merciless once the enemy decides to fight. Koios is very perceptive. He is called "the one who understands everything", and therefore he is the first Titan to realise Pontos's and Mnemosyne's betrayal to their cause and the true potential of humans.

Shortly after being reborn, he challenges Aiolia while the Saint guarded a meditating Shaka. Koios held the upper hand throughout most of the fight, but in the end he had to be saved by Hyperion after Aiolia unleashed his "Photon Burst". The attack irrevocably injured his yet imperfect body, rendering him a mortal. He challenges Aiolia a second time in the Time Labyrinth and intentionally forces Aiolia to reach his seventh sense, to teach him how to be a perfect warrior. After his defeat, he is sucked into Tartarus, but not before giving the power of "Keraunos" (雷（ケラウノス）, Keraunosu; Thunderbolt), the god-killing lightning he had devised in ancient times to end the Titanomachy, to his opponent.

Koios is extremely fast, even for a Gold Saint and, like Aiolia, he can control and use lightning in battle. His Soma has the shape of a rapier when it is not being used. His fighting techniques are: "Ebony Illumination" (漆黒光源（エボニー・イルミネイション）, Ebonī Irumineishon), "Sparkle Rapier" (閃光刺突（スパークル・レイピア）, Supākuru Reipia), "Ebony Gale" (漆黒疾風（エボニー・ゲイル）, Ebonī Geiru), "Thunder Black Rotation" (雷黒自転, Raikoku Jiden), "Ebony Rapier" (漆黒刺突（エボニー・レイピア）, Ebonī Reipia), and "Ebony Plasma" (黒雷放電（エボニー・プラズマ）, Ebonī Purazuma).

==== Galaxy Kreios ====
Galaxy Kreios (星漢のクレイオス, Seikan no Kureiosu) was one of the last Titans freed by Pontos with the help of Iapetos. He is serious in personality, but also violent. Even when furious, though, he never loses his mind, acting according to a strong sense of honour. He does not believe that gods should act solely for the benefit of humans. He sees gods as having completely free existences moved only by their all-powerful will.

He is highly respected by the Titans' minions, as shown by Phaios Spathe's words. He attacks Sanctuary just before Kronos goes to retrieve the "Megas Drepanon". There, he first challenges Shura. Shura barely manages to save his life then, only cutting Kreios's blade in half and lightly wounding him. The second time they meet is in the Time Labyrinth, after the Titan converses with his consort, Eurybia, and states that fighting for the Titans' cause comes before everything else. He is defeated by Shura after a brutal battle and acknowledges the Saints of Athena as worthy adversaries. Before dying, he grants his Ichor to the Capricorn Saint to heal him, and bequeaths him his sword.

Kreios's Soma has the shape of a scimitar. and he is known for the accurate and sharp blows of his "Aster Blade" (星断剣（アステル・ブレイド）, Asuteru Bureido; Star Blade). Besides this sword, he can also use the "Orichalcum Blade" (神鋼刃（オリハルコン・ブレイド）, Oriharukon Bureido) and the "Blue Divine Blade" (蒼神剣, Sōshinken). He is able to freely summon and manipulate crystals of Orichalcum, the major component of the Saints' Cloths. His fighting techniques are: "Aster Choreía" (星断円斬（アステル・コレイア）, Asuteru Koreia; Chorea of Stars), "Aster Kyklos" (星断光輪（アステル・キュクロス）, Asuteru Kyukurosu; Star Circle), "Aster Shield" (星護盾（アステル・シールド）, Asuteru Shīrudo; Star Shield), and "Shield Bash" (盾打（シールド・バッシュ）, Shīrudo Basshu).

==== Current Okeanos ====
Current Okeanos (清流のオケアノス, Seiryū no Okeanosu) was one of the Titans freed by Pontos with the help of Iapetos, along with Kreios and the Titanesses. He is very rational and does not let a vestige of emotion show on his face.

He travels to Sanctuary under the pretext of recovering Kreios's broken sword and engages first Aiolia in battle, then Camus. His true intentions are actually to provoke Aiolia enough that Iapetos can lure the Saint to the Time Labyrinth for the Titans to use him to restore Kronos's memory. Okeanos retains the upper hand during most of the fight. Still, he leaves before a winner is determined with a new appreciation for the power of humans.

His Soma has the shape of a pair of daggers. As god of the Ocean, Okeanos can control and summon water. He uses the techniques: "Thalassa Deluge" (大海氾濫（タラッサ・デリュージュ）, Tarassa Deryūju; Sea Flood), "Stream Edge" (清流之刃（ストリュウム・エッジ）, Sutoryūmu Ejji), "Current Impact" (海流衝撃（カレント・インパクト）, Karento Inpakuto), and "Auge Hydor" (輝光水流（アウゲー・ヒュドール）, Augē Hyudōru; Water of Auge).

In the Drama CDs, he is voiced by Kōsuke Okano.

==== Rhea ====
Pontos released Rhea (レア, Rea) at the same time as the other Titanesses, Okeanos and Kreios. She is Kronos's consort and, like the rest of the Titans, fought against the Olympian gods in the ancient Titanomachy. She is ruthless, but stoic and very loyal to Kronos. Although she has a strong desire to lead the Titans' followers to Earth, she does not have a high opinion of humans.

After Kronos is released, she appears at the Statue of Athena to protect him. She attacks Aiolia and Shura. After returning to the Time Labyrinth and taking care of Kronos, she sends one of her monsters to open the door that connects that place to Earth so the Titans' followers may cross it, but Camus blocks the entrance and defeats the monster. She mysteriously appears turned to stone afterwards.

Rhea's Soma has the shape of a katar. Her powers include the ability to summon and control mythical giant beasts, like python, hydras, and salamanders. One of her summoning technique is "Ge Python" (天地乃蛇（ゲー・ピュートーン）, Gē Pyūtōn; Gaia's Python).

==== Themis ====
Pontos released Themis (テミス, Temisu) at the same time as the other Titanesses, Okeanos and Kreios. Strict in personality, she is wild and rude towards enemies. She likes to let them die slowly, not for pleasure, like her consort Iapetos, but to make them feel the power of justice. She is the mother of Prometheus and nurtures a strong desire for revenge over the punishment Zeus bestowed on her son.

After protecting Kronos from Aiolia's "Photon Burst", Themis fights against the Leo Saint and defeats him, only to be stopped by Shura when delivering a would-be finishing blow. She leaves her opponents under her "Brabeus Talanton" and does not reappear until later alongside Iapetos in the Time Labyrinth, to fight Aiolia and Shaka. In the end, she gives her life to Iapetos so he may use her power.

As the embodiment of Justice, Themis can use the fighting techniques "Brabeus Blade" (審判乃刃（ブラベウス・ブレイド）, Burabeus Bureido; Blade of Arbiter) and "Brabeus Talanton" (審判乃天秤（ブラベウス・タラントン）, Burabeus Taranton; Balance of Arbiter), which crushes enemies under the weight of their sins. She judges from a god's point of view, though, so crimes against gods are especially damning. Her Soma has the shape of a spear.

==== Mnemosyne ====
Mnemosyne (ムネモシュネ, Munemoshune) is one of the six Titanesses. She has a frail and childlike appearance, and she is very calm and quiet. As the one who controls memories, the other Titanesses turn to her when trying to understand why Kronos lost his memories after his release. Her Soma is shaped as an axe. Mnemosyne plays an important role as Pontos's ally. She was Zeus's consort and a traitor in the last Titanomachy who brought about the Titans' defeat by stealing Koios's "Keraunos" and giving it to Zeus. In present times, only Iapetos and Hyperion have realised that she has been manipulating the Titans' memories, weakening them so that Pontos can use them freely to fulfil his plan.

==== Phoebe ====
Phoebe (ポイベ, Poibe) is Koios's consort. Like him, she cares about the future of the Titans' mortal followers. In order to give them a better world to live in, she is willing to fight to the end on behalf of her King, Kronos. She joins her sisters when they rush to Sanctuary to defend Kronos from Leo Aiolia's attacks, but later refrains from battling against the Gold Saints in the Time Labyrinth at Koios's request. Her Soma is shaped like a falchion.

==== Theia ====
Theia (テイア, Teia) is one of the six Titanesses. Like the other Titans, she seems to be very loyal to Kronos. She fought beside him in mythological times against the Olympian gods and continues to fight for him after being revived by Pontos. Theia rushes to Sanctuary alongside her sisters when the Gold Saint Leo Aiolia threatens to destroy Kronos's body. She protects her King and helps to get him to the safety of the Time Labyrinth. Like her brothers and sisters, her memory was altered by Mnemosyne and so she remains oblivious to Pontos's traitorous plans. Her Soma has the shape of a crossbow.

==== Tethys ====
Tethys (テテュス, Tetyusu) is one of the six Titanesses and consort of Okeanos. In mythological times, she and Okeanos refused to take part in the war between the Titans and the Olympian gods, but they encouraged their daughter Styx to fight on the side of the Olympians. Despite this, both of them were subjected to the same punishment as the rest of the Titans: indefinite imprisonment in Tartarus. Tethys stands with her sisters in order to protect Kronos from the Gold Saints when he is revived and afterwards helps to get him to the safety of his stronghold, the Time Labyrinth. Her memory has been altered by Mnemosyne and so she remains oblivious to Pontos's traitorous plans. Her Soma has the shape of a sledgehammer.

=== Primordial gods ===
Initially posing as the Titans' allies, these ancient gods later reveal to have an agenda of their own: to have Gaia absorb the Titans' Dunamis in order to awaken and regain control of the Earth herself, destroying everything in the process, both humans and gods.

==== Pontos ====
Pontos (ポントス, Pontosu) is the primordial god of the Sea, a first generation son of Gaia, the treacherous ally of the Titans and master of Saga. He is the "master of the flow" and so most of the time he does not intervene directly, but rather watches events unfold with the help of his cauldron and subtly directs events to fulfill his goals. He was sealed in a tomb in Egypt, near the Aswan Dam, but was unintentionally released by Aiolos after his Ichor escaped the weakened seal and started reviving all sorts of monsters.

He is a strange and cunning character, alternating between being cynical and analytical, and a frothing madman guided by pure disdain for everything except his mistress Gaia. Hyperion greatly distrusts him, a suspicion which is later confirmed, but nevertheless tolerates him for being the one responsible for the awakening of the Titans.

He fights Aiolia at the entrance to the Time Labyrinth, completely overwhelming him, but retreats when the other Gold Saints come to aid the Leo Saint. Pontos controls water, much like Current Okeanos. His water, however, is jet-black. His greatest power is in his Dunamis, the Cosmo of the gods. With it, he can use the techniques "Melas Kuma" (黒キ波（メラス・キューマ）, Merasu Kyūma; Black Wave) and "Melas Helix" (黒渦（メラス・ヘリクス）, Merasu Herikusu; Black Spiral) to control dark water in battle. His armour is called Ars Magna (大いなる秘宝（アルス・マグナ）, Arusu Maguna; Great Art).

He is voiced by Hiroki Yasumoto in the Drama CDs.

==== Gaia ====
Gaia (ガイア) is the Earth Goddess. She is the mother of the Titans, the Cyclops, the Hechatonchires, Uranus and Pontos and the creator of the Somas. She is the Mistress of Pontos and the reason he revived the Titans and initiated a new Titanomachy. Trapped in a dormant state under a fountain of turbulent waters in Tartarus, she absorbs the power of the Titans every time one of them is killed, each bringing her closer to awakening.

==== Prometheus ====
Prometheus (プロメテウス, Purometeusu) is the black-winged son of Iapetos and Themis. A friend of humans, he once shared fire with mankind, a dangerous gift that Zeus believed could lead to insurgency against the gods. As a result, Zeus left Prometheus chained at the top of the Caucasus mountain and condemned him to eternal suffering as an eagle repeatedly ate his regenerating liver. Despite this punishment, Prometheus is seen carrying his parents' bodies to Tartarus and appears alongside Pontos at Gaia's sealing place.

==== "Hope" ====
A mysterious god who appears before Lithos and Kronos while they attempt to escape the Time Labyrinth. He tells them about the myth of Pandora and, when Lithos asks him who he is, he says that at the moment he is their "hope". He then creates a stairway of floating rocks that leads outside. He later appears alongside Mnemosyne, as he and Pontos order her to strike Kronos's heart with despair by releasing his memories. He has short, light hair and wears a long trench coat. His true name is not yet known.

=== Giants ===
The Giants (ギガス兵神, Gigasu Hyōshin) are nine deities Kronos released from Tartarus, where they had been sealed by Uranus, to aid Hyperion and Iapetos before the rise of the other Titans. They are powerful gods with bodies so resistant that they can withstand fires of over 1200 °C. Although in the story all of them were revived simultaneously, they were sent to fight Athena's Saints in groups or individually in different occasions.

Phoinikeos Rhuax (紅の溶岩（ポインクスのリュアクス）, Poinkusu no Ryuakusu; literally "Crimson Lava") attacked Sanctuary along with Kyanos Pyrokus (群青の炎（キュアノスのプロクス）, Kyuanos no Purokusu; "Blue Flame"). The first possesses enormous physical strength and initially challenges Marin, but it is Aiolia who defeats him. Meanwhile, Kyanos Pyrokus, who is able to hide himself in invisibility, attempts to infiltrate the Golden Zodiac. He is stopped by Shaka at the Temple of Aries before the Saint allows him to proceed to the Temple of Cancer, where Deathmask kills him. His fighting techniques, "Blazing Claw Whip" (焔爪鞭, Ensōben) and "Melted Rock-forming" (溶融造岩, Yōyūzūgan), include the manipulation of molten rock and fire.

After Leo Aiolia's battle against Koios, two more Giants attempt to attack the weakened Saint: Leukotes Anemos (白の風（レウコテースのアネモス）, Reukotēsu no Anemosu; "White Wind") and Melas Bronte (黒の雷（メラースのブロンテー）, Merāsu no Burontē; "Black Thunder"). They are, however, quickly killed by Shaka.

Phaios Spathe (灰色の刃（パイオスのスパテー）, Paiosu no Supatē; "Grey Blade") is the fifth Giant to appear. He carries two enormous blades on his arms and challenges Shura after slaughtering a group of soldiers loyal to Kronos who are retreating due to the Gold Saint's attacks. Phaios Spathe is mortally wounded by Shura's "Excalibur", but he is killed by Kreios's "Aster Blade", sacrificing himself so the Titan could deliver an easy blow on the Capricorn Saint. He uses the fighting technique "Eight Direction Claw" (八陣爪, Hachijinsō).

Anthrakma Zugylos (紅玉の鉄（アントラクマのジギーロス）, Antorakuma no Jigīrosu; "Ruby Iron") is the sixth Giant to appear in the manga. He faces both Aiolia and Aphrodite at the entrance of the dimension of the Titans. He wields a giant ruby mace which creates blinding flashes of red and destructive waves of resonance that can disintegrate almost anything they touch. The Giant's punches also possess this power. He is defeated and killed by Aphrodite.

The last three Giants, Nefritis Hoplisma (翡翠の鎧（ネフリテス・ホプリスマ）, Nefuritesu Hopurisuma; "Jade Armour"), Elektron Ther (琥珀の獣（エーレクトロン・テール）, Ērekutoron Tēru; "Amber Beast"), and Margarites Drakon (真珠の竜（マルガリーテース・ドラコーン）, Marugarītēsu Dorakōn; "Pearl Dragon"), are Kronos's three guardian planets that usually take the form of the three long locks of the god's hair. They are the strongest of the Giants. Nefritis Hoplisma can use resonating vibration waves and the technique "Dunamis Pelekys" (神力斧（デュナミス・ペレキュス）, Dyunamisu Perekyusu; Dunamis Axe) to attack. Aldebaran and Shura defeat him, as the Gold Saints split into groups of two to face Kronos's three guardians. Elektron Ther has the ability to spit fire from his mouth and he can use the technique "Dunamis Odous" (神力牙（デュナミス・オドゥース）, Dyunamisu Odoūsu; Dunamis Fang). He is eliminated by Shaka. Margarites Drakon has the ability to attack by throwing ten thousand water needles at his opponents and also use the technique "Dunamis Pneuma" (神力息吹（デュナミス・プネウマ）, Dyunamisu Puneuma; Dunamis Breath). Camus and Milo join forces to eliminate him.

== Other characters ==
Apophis (アポフィス, Apofisu) and the army of the Sun God (太陽神軍, Taiyōshin gun)
Apophis is the evil snake-god of the Sun from the Egyptian pantheon, inside whom Hyperion was sealed. Both the god and his army are revived by Pontos's divine blood. The army is defeated by Aiolos after attacking him with their "Solar Sword" (太陽剣, Taiyōken) technique in the Egyptian desert. Apophis is later slain by the Saint as Aiolos escorts Miko Hasegawa into an ancient tomb that had been exposed with the completion of the Aswan Dam.
Aries Shion (牡羊座（アリエス）のシオン, Ariesu no Shion)
Former Aries Saint and master of Mu, he is one of the two survivors of the previous Holy War, along with Dohko. He is also the Pope of Sanctuary, until Saga kills and impersonates him. He appears only briefly as a graceful and powerful Gold Saint in a special chapter, using the fighting technique "Stardust Revolution" to eliminate the last of Hades's soldiers.
Cliff O'Kents (クリフ・オケントス, Kurifu Okentosu) and Typhon (テュポーン, Tyupōn)
Typhon is an enormous monster born of Gaia and Tartarus. He is responsible for the 1973 storm that sinks the ship in which young Cliff O'Kents travels. The child is saved by Aiolos, who promptly defeats the giant.
Euryale (エウリュアレ, Euryuare)
A Gorgon who petrifies and kills the Silver Saint Triangle Noesis. Aiolia goes to Chuang-Yan province to defeat her, but instead he allows that Silver Saint's student, Retsu, to kill the Gorgon himself.
Eurybia (エウリュピア, Euryupia)
Eurybia is a sea goddess, daughter of Pontos and consort of Kreios. Fearing for the future of the Titans and the consequences of her father's plan, she fruitlessly pleads Kreios to abandon the fight and join her in the depths of the ocean through a giant mirror-like artefact. He refuses. She later feels his death and mourns him.
Hades (ハーデス, Hādesu)
The god who rules the Underworld. Recognising Aiolia's determination after their deadly battle, Kronos makes a deal with Hades, who had witnessed their fight. The Titan King offers him his power in exchange for saving Aiolia's life.
Hecatonchires (ヘカトンケイル, Hekatonkeiru)
Giant creatures with fifty heads and two immense arms that can split into a hundred minor ones, the Hecatonchires are children of Uranus and Gaia and therefore siblings of the Titans and the Cyclops. Iapetos summons one during the confrontation in Jamir against Mu to aid him in battle. Their bodies are very resistant: Iapetos uses them in conjunction with the "Khora Temnein", having their arms cross dimensions to reappear in a different place and attack an enemy. The Hecatonchires can use two special fighting techniques: "Hekaton Menis" (百の激怒（ヘカトン・メニス）, Hekaton Menisu; Rage of Hecatonchire) and "Hekaton Molybdaina" (百弾（ヘカトン・モリュブダイナ）, Hekaton Moryubudaina; Lead-strength Hecatonchire).
Hector (ヘクトル, Hekutoru)
A hero from the past who fought in the Trojan War and was slain by Achilles. He returns to Earth thanks to the influence of Pontos and challenges Milo to battle to erase his defeat from History. In the end, he is defeated by Milo's "Antares".
John Black (ジョン・ブラック, Jon Burakku) and the Sanctuary renegade
John Black is an American negotiator who is sent to Three Mile Island's nuclear power plant along with Aiolia to deal with a terrorist. The criminal reveals himself to be a former Saint trainee who wants to create a catastrophe large enough that it will require the intervention of a Saint to resolve it, which will allow him to fight a Saint and win a Cloth. He kills John Black as the negotiator tries to protect Aiolia, an event which teaches the young Gold Saint the importance of helping others and gives him the incentive to defeat the renegade.
King Minos (ミノス王, Minosu Ō) and the Minotaur (ミノタウロス, Minotaurosu)
Aiolia is assigned to go with his servants Lithos and Galan to find an evil spirit in Crete that had been causing the disappearance of children. While searching in the ruins of Knossos, Aiolia and his servants are attacked by the spirit of King Minos, who commands the Minotaur and is devouring the souls of the abducted children. Aiolia easily defeats Minos and the Minotaur.
Living statue (生きた石像（リビィングスタチュー）, Ribīngu sutachū)
A giant stone statue built by Lithos's father under the Pope's commission. Having died during its construction and refusing to leave his orphan daughter alone, the soul of Lithos's father inhabits the statue, which causes great destruction in a village close to Sanctuary. Aiolia eventually promises him to look after Lithos, putting his soul to rest and allowing the statue to crumble. Jun'ya Miura provided the voice for this character in the Drama CD.
Mortal followers of the Titans
A community of mortals who followed the Titans and fought on their behalf. They were imprisoned in the dark world of Tartarus alongside the Titans after the end of the mythological Titanomachy. Worried about their well-being, Hyperion asks for Aiolia's word that they will be looked after even should the Titans be defeated. After Kronos's death, these humans are welcomed by Cancer Deathmask at Death Queen Island, where they are to don Black Cloths.
Sea Dragon Kanon (海龍（シードラゴン）のカノン, Shī Doragon no Kanon)
The twin brother of Saga. He is trapped in the prison of Cape Sounion by his brother when he recognises the darkness inside Saga. He later escapes and reaches the Temple of Poseidon, where he swears revenge against his brother and all Saints of Athena. Telling the god he is one of his Generals, he tries to manipulate Poseidon to rule the Earth himself.

== Merchandise and reception ==
Several items featuring depictions of the characters of Episode.G have been made available with the purchase of the limited editions of the manga. Such items include postcards, pins, a coin key holder, a day planner, tarot cards, a t-shirt, puzzles, calendars, a pass case and a key chain. Akita Shoten has also released a bust figure of the main protagonist, Leo Aiolia.

The new character design of Saint Seiya Episode.G constitutes a departure from that of Saint Seiya, a fact which has divided opinions. While some criticise the androgynous design, others acclaim it for its innovation. French critic Thomas Berthelon notes that Okada's depiction of the Saints "perfectly renders the divine quality" of these characters. At the same time, he comments that the graphical complexity of Episode.G sometimes interferes with readability and that this difficulty brought to memory "the most beautiful pages of Kaori Yuki's manga Angel Sanctuary". Berthelon also remarks on the unoriginality of the story as, among other things, he feels the main characters are too similar in personality to the protagonists of the original series. The reviewers of Manga Sanctuary and Manga-News extend this criticism to the antagonists, saying that the Titans have little charisma and their interventions are repetitive. The reviewer from Manga-News, however, offered praise to the Titan King, Kronos, for his interesting, surprisingly childlike and unstable personality.

Another aspect which has received praise is Okada's exploration of the relations between Saints and regular people and how they interact with the real world, something unseen in Saint Seiya. Brazilian critic Pedro Hunter highlights the inclusion of the Saints' participation in the real-life Three Mile Island accident. He says that, in the original series, the Saints "seemed to exist apart from society and fought only in remote places."

== See also ==
- List of Saint Seiya characters
- Titan (mythology)
- Egyptian pantheon
