= Amaterasu (disambiguation) =

Amaterasu Japanese: 天照 アマテラス is the goddess of the sun in Japanese mythology.

Amaterasu may also refer to:

== Astronomy ==
- 10385 Amaterasu, a main belt asteroid
- Amaterasu Patera, a crater on Io
- Amaterasu particle, an ultra-high-energy cosmic ray detected in 2021

== Fiction ==
- "Amaterasu!" (Japanese: 天照!), 2009 TV episode, episode 137 season 6 number 25 of the anime Naruto: Shippuden; see List of Naruto: Shippuden episodes

=== Literature ===
- Amaterasu (manga) (Japanese: アマテラス), a manga series by Suzue Miuchi
- "Amaterasu" (Japanese: アマテラス), chapter 108 of the manga Saint Seiya Episode.G; see List of Saint Seiya Episode.G chapters
- "Amaterasu" (Japanese: 天照), chapter 71 of the manga Shy (manga)

=== Fictional characters ===
- Amaterasu (Ōkami) (Japanese: 天照 アマテラス), the protagonist of the video game Ōkami
- Amaterasu (Stargate), a character in the television series Stargate SG-1
- Amaterasu, the central figure of the manga series The Five Star Stories
- Amaterasu (Japanese: アマテラス), a character from Future Card Buddyfight
- Amaterasu Miko (Japanese: アマテラス・ミコ), a character in the manga series O-Parts Hunter
- Amaterasu (Japanese: アマテラス), a character from the video game Persona 4

=== Fictional objects ===
- Amaterasu, a fictional game server and virtual city in Digimon World 3
- Amaterasu (Japanese: アマテラス), a ship in the anime series Starship Operators
- Amaterasu, a solar probe in Andy Weir's Project Hail Mary

== See also ==
- 天照 (disambiguation) (Japanese: アマテラス, romanized: Amaterasu); the Japanese term "天照" is pronounced as "amaterasu"
