= Shadow Skill =

Japanese manga series and its adaptations

- First tankōbon volume cover (Bamboo Comics edition)
- Manga

Phantom of Shade / Black Howling / Black Wing
- Written by: Megumu Okada
- Published by: Takeshobo (1992–1996); Fujimi Shobo (1997–1999); Kodansha (1999 – current)
- Magazine: Comic Gamma; (1992–1996); Monthly Dragon Jr.; (1997–1998)
- Original run: 1992 – 1998
- Volumes: 4 (original); 3 (reissue) (Note: The 4 original volumes were later reissued by Kodansha in 3 aizōban editions retitled as: 1. Shadow Skill: Phantom of Shade; 2. Shadow Skill: Black Howling; 3. Shadow Skill: Black Wing)
- Manga
- Written by: Megumu Okada
- Published by: Kodansha
- Imprint: Afternoon KC Deluxe
- Magazine: Afternoon Season Zōkan; (February 10, 2000 – October 10, 2002); Monthly Afternoon; (February 25, 2003 – March 24, 2014)
- Original run: February 10, 2000 – March 24, 2014
- Volumes: 11
Further information
Manga
Shadow Skill Dawn
| Written by | Megumu Okada |
| Published by | Tokuma Shoten |
| Magazine | Comic Ryū |
| Original run | April 24, 2026 – present |
Original video animation
| Directed by | Hiroshi Negishi (#1); Yasuhiro Kuroda (#2–4) |
| Written by | Mayori Sekijima |
| Music by | Toshiro Yabuki |
| Studio | Zero-G Room |
| Licensed by | AUS: Madman Entertainment; NA: Manga Entertainment; UK: Manga Entertainment |
| Released | October 25, 1995 – November 21, 1996 |
| Runtime | 45 minutes (#1); 30 minutes (#2–4) |
| Episodes | 4 (Note: Episode 1 of OVA series was released in North America and the United Kingdom under the title Shadow Skill: The Origin as a prequel of Shadow Skill: The Movie.) |
Anime film
Shadow Skill: The Movie (Note: Shadow Skill: The Movie is a compilation movie of OVAs 2 to 4 that was released exclusively in North America and the United Kingdom.)
| Directed by | Yasuhiro Kuroda |
| Produced by | Laurence Guinness |
| Written by | Kaoru Mfaume |
| Music by | Toshiro Yabuki |
| Studio | Zero-G Room |
| Licensed by | NA: Manga Entertainment; UK: Manga Entertainment |
| Released | October 28, 1997 |
| Runtime | 85 minutes |
Anime television series
Shadow Skill: Eigi
| Directed by | Tsukasa Sunaga |
| Produced by | Shinjiro Yokoyama; Masahiro Toyosumi |
| Written by | Masashi Sogo |
| Music by | Ozamu Tezuka |
| Studio | Studio Deen |
| Licensed by | NA: ADV Films |
| Original network | TV Tokyo |
| English network | SEA: AXN; US: Anime Network |
| Original run | July 3, 1998 – December 25, 1998 |
| Episodes | 26 |
Original video animation
Shadow Skill — Kurdan Style: The Secret of the Lethal Martial Art
| Directed by | Kazuya Ichikawa |
| Written by | Kurasumi Sunayama |
| Music by | Hidenori Chiwata |
| Studio | Tandm |
| Released | October 2, 2004 |
| Runtime | 60 minutes |
- icon

Shadow Skill (stylized in all caps) is a Japanese manga series written and illustrated by Megumu Okada. The series has been adapted into four original video animations released from 1995 to 1996 and an anime adaptation produced by Studio Deen aired on TV Tokyo in 1998.

In North America, the OVAs have been released by Manga Entertainment and the anime television series was distributed by ADV Films.

== Plot ==
Shadow Skill takes place in the warrior kingdom of Kuruda, where Elle Ragu has recently become the 59th Sevaar, a title awarded to their most elite warriors. She often leaves a trail of destruction when she fights and along with a drinking habit. Elle is constantly followed by debts and throughout the series takes on jobs to work off these debts. One of these such jobs leads her to the Green Octopus Inn on an island outside the city, which eventually becomes the protagonists' base of operation.

Throughout the series, Elle travels along with her adopted younger brother Gau Ban, who is studying Elle's fighting skills so that one day he could become the greatest Sevaar in Kuruda. Also in Elle and Gau's life is Faulink Maya (Faulee), a Sui Rame talisman sorceress, and Kyuo Liu, a Septia beast-catcher and grandniece of Eva Stroll, the king of Kuruda.

Warriors in Kuruda fight using the Kurudan-style Kōsappō (交殺法; lit. 'combining kill methods', ADV dub: 'annihilation techniques') which has two general divisions: Hyōgi (表技; lit. 'bright skills'), which emphasize punches and throws, and Eigi (影技; lit. 'shadow skills'), which focus on kicks and the user's footwork.

== Media ==
=== Manga ===
The Shadow Skill manga series was originally created by Megumu Okada as a self-published doujinshi. In 1992, it was picked up by Takeshobo for serialization in its shōnen magazine Comic Gamma. The magazine ceased publication in 1996; four tankōbon volumes collecting the manga's chapters were released during that time, between January 14, 1993, and August 2, 1996. Shadow Skill was carried over by publisher Fujimi Shobo in its magazine Monthly Dragon Jr. from 1997 to 1998; under the subtitle "The Ashliana Saga", another four volumes were released by that publisher between June 15 and December 15, 1998. In 1999, Kodansha gained the rights to Shadow Skill and released the existing chapters in three aizōban volumes from November 23, 1999, to June 22, 2000.

The following year, Okada began regularly publishing new chapters in Kodansha's seinen manga magazine Afternoon Season Zōkan on February 10, 2000. The magazine ceased publication after its 14th issue on October 10, 2002, and the series moved to Monthly Afternoon on February 25, 2003. Okada took a hiatus from the manga in December 2005, but resumed in July 2009, submitting new chapters every other month, until finishing the series on March 24, 2014. Kodansha collected its chapters in 11 tankōbon volumes, released from September 21, 2001, to May 23, 2014. In total, Kodansha released the entire Shadow Skill series in three aizōban volumes, and an additional 11 tankōbon volumes.

A new manga series titled Shadow Skill Dawn began serialization on Tokuma Shoten's Comic Ryū website since April 24, 2026.

==== Takeshobo volumes ====
| No. | Release date | ISBN |
|---|---|---|
| 1 | January 14, 1993 | 4-88475-616-9 |
| 2 | June 27, 1994 | 4-88475-713-0 |
| 3 | July 27, 1995 | 4-88475-814-5 |
| 4 | August 2, 1996 | 4-8124-5066-7 |

==== "The Ashliana Saga" volumes ====
| No. | Release date | ISBN |
|---|---|---|
| 1 | June 15, 1998 | 4-0492-6117-0 |
| 2 | October 1998 | 4-0492-6122-7 |
| 3 | October 1998 | 4-0492-6125-1 |
| 4 | December 15, 1998 | 4-0492-6127-8 |

==== Kodansha aizōban ====
| No. | Title | Release date | ISBN |
|---|---|---|---|
| 1 | Phantom of Shade | November 23, 1999 | 978-4-06-334240-6 |
| 2 | Black Howling | February 23, 2000 | 978-4-06-334283-3 |
| 3 | Black Wing | June 22, 2000 | 978-4-06-334310-6 |

==== Kodansha volumes ====
| No. | Release date | ISBN |
|---|---|---|
| 1 | September 21, 2001 | 978-4-06-334457-8; 978-4-06-336333-3 (LE) |
| 2 | November 22, 2002 | 978-4-06-334630-5 |
| 3 | December 22, 2003 | 978-4-06-334826-2 |
| 4 | November 22, 2004 | 978-4-06-334949-8 |
| 5 | April 21, 2006 | 978-4-06-372134-8 |
| 6 | May 21, 2010 | 978-4-06-375923-5 |
| 7 | March 23, 2011 | 978-4-06-376040-8 |
| 8 | January 23, 2012 | 978-4-06-376187-0 |
| 9 | January 23, 2013 | 978-4-06-376769-8 |
| 10 | September 20, 2013 | 978-4-06-376887-9 |
| 11 | May 23, 2014 | 978-4-06-376987-6 |

=== Anime ===
==== Original video animations ====
There have been a number of anime productions based on the Shadow Skill manga. It was first adapted into an original video animation (OVA) by Zero-G Room and released in Japan on October 25, 1995. Three additional OVA episodes were produced and released from September 21 to November 21, 1996. The first volume was officially numbered "volume 2.5" in Japan due to its chronological place among the four episodes. All four OVAs were licensed in North America and the United Kingdom by Manga Entertainment. The latter three episodes were compiled and released in English-speaking regions as Shadow Skill: The Movie, while the first OVA was later released as Shadow Skill: The Origin. A cel shaded, CGI animation OVA titled Shadow Skill — Kurdan Style: The Secret of the Lethal Martial Art (影技 ～クルダ流交殺法の秘密～, Shadō Sukiru Kuruda-ryū Kōsatsu-hō no Himitsu) was produced by Tandm and released in Japan on October 2, 2004.

==== TV series ====
A 26-episode television series titled Shadow Skill: Eigi (SHADOW SKILL —影技—) was produced by Studio Deen and aired on TV Tokyo from July 3 to December 25, 1998. (Note: Shadow Skill: Eigi aired on TV Tokyo on Thursday 25:15, effectively Friday at 1:15 a.m. JST.) The opening theme is "Born Legend" by Kasumi. The ending themes are "Last Quarter" by Princess Purin, and "For My Pride" by Spirit Level.

ADV Films licensed the series in the United States.

| No. | Title | Directed by | Written by | Storyboarded by | Original release date |
|---|---|---|---|---|---|
| 1 | "The Power of My Blow has No Equal!"; Transliteration: "Waga Ichigeki wa Mutekinari" (Japanese: 我が一撃は無敵なり) | Teruo Satō | Masashi Sogo | Tsukasa Sunaga | July 3, 1998 |
| 2 | "Duelists"; Transliteration: "Kettōshatachi" (Japanese: 決闘者たち) | Kunihisa Sugishima | Ryōta Yamaguchi | Kunihisa Sugishima | July 10, 1998 |
| 3 | "Phantom's Keepsake"; Transliteration: "Fantomu no Wasuregatami" (Japanese: ファントムの忘れ形見) | Takeshi | Kōji Ueda | Tsukasa Sunaga | July 17, 1998 |
| 4 | "What My Father Left Me"; Transliteration: "Chichi ga Nokoshita Mono" (Japanese: 父が遺したもの) | Shunji Yoshida | Hisashi Tokimura | Hisashi Tokimura | July 24, 1998 |
| 5 | "Proud Battlefield"; Transliteration: "Hokori Takaki Senjō" (Japanese: 誇り高き戦場) | Teruo Satō | Masashi Sogo | Tsukasa Sunaga Nobuo Shirahata | July 31, 1998 |
| 6 | "White and Black Flash"; Transliteration: "Shiro to Kuro no Senkō" (Japanese: 白と黒の閃光) | Makoto Bessho | Kōji Ueda | Makoto Bessho | August 7, 1998 |
| 7 | "Destined Confrontation"; Transliteration: "Shukumei no Taiketsu" (Japanese: 宿命の対決) | Akira Shimizu | Ryōta Yamaguchi | Naoyuki Yoshinaga | August 14, 1998 |
| 8 | "Dangerous Human Weapon. To the North"; Transliteration: "Ningen Kyōki. Kita e" (Japanese: 人間凶器. 北へ) | Shunji Yoshida | Masashi Sogo | Tsukasa Sunaga | August 21, 1998 |
| 9 | "Violent Bombing of the Holy City"; Transliteration: "Seito Bakuretsu su" (Japanese: 聖都爆烈す) | Teruo Satō | Masashi Sogo | Tsukasa Sunaga | August 28, 1998 |
| 10 | "Clash of White and Black"; Transliteration: "Shiro to Kuro no Gekitotsu" (Japanese: 白と黒の激突) | Naoki Hishikawa | Kōji Ueda | Makoto Bessho | September 4, 1998 |
| 11 | "Invasion"; Transliteration: "Shinkō" (Japanese: 侵攻) | Akihiko Nishiyama | Masashi Sogo | Junji Nishimura | September 11, 1998 |
| 12 | "Black Howling"; Transliteration: "Kuroki Hōkō" (Japanese: 黒き咆哮) | Shunji Yoshida | Masashi Sogo | Junji Nishimura | September 18, 1998 |
| 13 | "With the Heart of a Friend"; Transliteration: "Tomo no Kokoro to Tomoni" (Japanese: 友の心とともに) | Teruo Satō | Masashi Sogo | Tsukasa Sunaga | September 25, 1998 |
| 14 | "The Temple of Moonlight"; Transliteration: "Tsukikage Shinden" (Japanese: 月影神殿) | Naoki Hishikawa | Hisashi Tokimura | Naoyuki Yoshinaga | October 2, 1998 |
| 15 | "Ghost"; Transliteration: "Bōrei" (Japanese: 亡霊) | Akihiko Nishiyama | Masashi Sogo | Tsukasa Sunaga | October 9, 1998 |
| 16 | "An Attacker From the Past"; Transliteration: "Kako kara no Shūgeki-sha" (Japanese: 過去からの襲撃者) | Teruo Satō | Masashi Sogo | Junji Nishimura | October 16, 1998 |
| 17 | "Crimson"; Transliteration: "Guren" (Japanese: 紅蓮) | Makoto Bessho | Masashi Sogo | Tsukasa Sunaga | October 23, 1998 |
| 18 | "The Seventh Dawn"; Transliteration: "Dainana no Akatsuki" (Japanese: 第七の暁) | Makoto Bessho | Masashi Sogo | Tsukasa Sunaga | October 30, 1998 |
| 19 | "Fang, 2nd Generation"; Transliteration: "Kiba, Ni-dai" (Japanese: 牙、二代) | Akihiko Nishiyama | Masashi Sogo | Naoyuki Yoshinaga | November 6, 1998 |
| 20 | "Darkness and Death"; Transliteration: "Yami to Shi to" (Japanese: 闇と死と) | Shunji Yoshida | Masashi Sogo | Junji Nishimura | November 13, 1998 |
| 21 | "Cannon"; Transliteration: "Kamine: Kanon" (Japanese: 神音 –カノン–) | Teruo Satō | Masashi Sogo | Tsukasa Sunaga | November 20, 1998 |
| 22 | "Older Sister, Younger Brother"; Transliteration: "Ane, Otōto" (Japanese: あね、おとうと) | Naoki Hishikawa | Masashi Sogo | Tsukasa Sunaga | November 27, 1998 |
| 23 | "Prepare Yourself"; Transliteration: "Kakugo o Kimero" (Japanese: 覚悟を決めろ) | Yoshinari Suzuki | Masashi Sogo | Junji Nishimura | December 4, 1998 |
| 24 | "Fist of God"; Transliteration: "Kami no Kobushi" (Japanese: 神の拳) | Akihiko Nishimura | Masashi Sogo | Tsukasa Sunaga | December 11, 1998 |
| 25 | "Ying-style Demon"; Transliteration: "Kageryū no Ma To" (Japanese: 陰流の魔徒) | Shunji Yoshida | Masashi Sogo | Junji Nishimura | December 18, 1998 |
| 26 | "Path of a Sevaar"; Transliteration: "Sevāru e no Michi" (Japanese: 修練闘士(セヴァール)への道) | Teruo Satō | Masashi Sogo | Tsukasa Sunaga | December 25, 1998 |

== Reception ==
Anime News Network praised the series' Japanese and English voice acting, saying they did a good job capturing the light-hearted tone of the series. However, they felt the series stuck to the conventions of the martial arts genre with the plot focusing on fight scenes and the elaborate named moves being shouted aloud as they "powered up". As such, they thought that Shadow Skill appeals primarily to fans of the genre, but it was unlikely to appeal to viewers outside that fanbase. THEM Anime Reviews described the OVA series as "well executed" and "fun to watch". But they advised that Shadow Skill would mainly appeal to fans of the martial arts genre and that it lacked the story development and characterization needed to truly become a great anime.
