= List of Saint Tail characters =

This is a list of known characters in the manga and anime series Saint Tail.

== Main characters ==
Meimi Haneoka

Meimi Haneoka (羽丘 芽美, Haneoka Meimi)
Voiced by: Tomo Sakurai (Japanese); Mela Lee (English)^{Ep. 1}
The protagonist of the series, a fourteen-year-old girl at St. Paulia's Academy, and the daughter of a stage magician and a former phantom thief. Using information that Seira gets from confessionals, she sneaks out at night as Phantom Thief Saint Tail (怪盗セイント・テール, Kaitō Seinto Tēru), a vigilante who uses her thefts to return illegitimately obtained items to their proper owners, expose fraud, or rectify other wrongs that the legal system is unlikely to address. She primarily uses her high physical ability and stage magic inherited from her father to carry out her heists, and the name "Saint Tail" comes from the ponytail she wears in conjunction with her stage magician outfit.
As Saint Tail, she has a rivalry with her classmate, Asuka Jr., who is assigned to the Saint Tail cases as an assistant detective. As she observes his sincerity and enthusiasm while pursuing her as Saint Tail, she develops romantic feelings for him, feeling that she wants to encourage his passion and would be willing to be caught as long as he is the one to do it; however, she mistakenly believes that he would only have interest in Saint Tail and not "Meimi Haneoka", and that he would quickly despise her if he discovered her deceiving him with her secret identity due to his honest personality. Due to her feelings of guilt, she begins to withdraw into emotional isolation, failing to notice that Asuka Jr. has already begun to suspect her identity and has conversely been worried about her.
After Asuka Jr. unexpectedly confesses his love to Meimi and starts a romantic relationship with her, she becomes even more afraid of the idea of him discovering her deception and is unable to open up about her own feelings, but when Seira suggests that she consider retiring from being Saint Tail, she still feels an obligation to continue helping people in need. Eventually, Rosemary exposes her identity to Asuka Jr. and kidnaps him, forcing her to perform her "last theft" as Saint Tail to rescue him. In the process, Asuka Jr., who in fact has completely forgiven her, physically "catches" her in free fall and metaphorically "catches" her by relieving her of her duty as Saint Tail, resulting in Saint Tail vanishing from the public eye while Meimi returns to a normal life. Eight years later, she cuts her hair short and eventually marries Asuka Jr. after he proposes to her.
Daiki Asuka (飛鳥 大貴, Asuka Daiki)
Voiced by: Kohsuke Okano (Japanese); Joshua Seth (English)^{Ep. 1}
A classmate of Meimi and son of Detective Tomoki Asuka, nicknamed Asuka Jr. (アスカJr., Asuka Juniā) by most people around him. While he has high academic ability and intellect, he has poor social skills and has difficulty understanding romance or girls. He is brought onto the Saint Tail cases as an assistant due to his connections via his father; while he disapproves of Saint Tail's methods, he respects her altruistic motives and considers her to be an honorable rival. His initial motive for catching Saint Tail is to satisfy his inferiority complex over his classmates making fun of him for his failure to catch her, so he meets with Saint Tail in secret and extracts a promise from her to always send him a calling card and let him know every time she embarks on a caper, and to not allow anyone else to capture her but him.
While he develops romantic feelings for Meimi at school, he remains unsure about his relationship with her due to believing that she dislikes him and has merely been putting up with him, but secretly tries to help her in various ways without informing her of his intentions. After one of Saint Tail's heists causes him to start having suspicions of her actually being Meimi, he develops an extreme obsession with catching Saint Tail himself and ascertaining whether this is the case; in the process, he begins to sympathize with Saint Tail's actions and harbor doubts about arresting her, observing that Saint Tail has become an "ideal" whom the world treats more as a concept than a human being.
When an incident leads to him almost being permanently taken off the Saint Tail cases, he expresses distaste at the idea of allowing anyone else to catch her in his place, feeling that he cannot trust anyone else with it; eventually, he realizes this to be an extension of his own refusal to trust anyone else with Meimi's well-being, leading to him confessing his love and beginning a romantic relationship with her. Soon after, Rosemary forcibly reveals Saint Tail's identity as Meimi to him and kidnaps him, forcing him to speculate about Meimi's intentions for four days in isolated captivity, but when Saint Tail comes to rescue him and Maju mocks one of her calling cards by calling it a "love letter", he realizes that Meimi had been trying to support him the entire time and goes out to help her, literally and figuratively "catching" her and forgiving her for everything. Eight years later, he becomes a private detective in order to carry on Saint Tail's wish of protecting Seika City, and is implied to be using Seira's confessional tips the way she once did; he continues to help keep Meimi's secret, and eventually proposes to and marries her.
Seira Mimori (深森 聖良, Mimori Seira)
Voiced by: Kikuko Inoue (Japanese); Anjuli Cain (English)^{Ep. 1}
A trainee nun who uses her position to hear out the townspeople's troubles through confessionals and pass on the information to Saint Tail so she can plan out her next heist. While she has a gentle personality, she often avoids things that are inconvenient for her by claiming that "everything is the will of God." She was the one originally responsible for making Meimi into Saint Tail, having convinced her to use it as an opportunity to show off the stage magic that her father had forbidden her from showing in public. She considers helping the "lost lambs" to be a duty from God, intends to share responsibility if Saint Tail gets caught, and gives her advice, information, support, and prayers to ensure that her heists go smoothly. Besides hearing out confessionals, she is also talented at information gathering, and she can also manipulate people into doing things by making use of their weaknesses.
While Sawatari eventually takes a romantic interest in her, she is unable to fully return his feelings due to her position requiring her to remain celibate, but she still forms a good relationship with him regardless. Eight years later, she is implied to be giving the adult Asuka Jr. information about "lost lambs" from confessionals the way she did for Saint Tail.

== Supporting characters ==
=== St. Paulia's Academy students ===
Rina Takamiya (高宮 リナ, Takamiya Rina)
Voiced by: Yūko Nagashima (Japanese); Brianne Siddall (English)^{Ep. 7}
A transfer student and the niece of Mayor Morinaka. Shortly after her arrival in Seika, she declares Saint Tail to be "evil" and uses her connections to force herself onto the Saint Tail cases, easily resorting to using methods such as tear gas against Asuka Jr.'s protests.
Having developed feelings for Asuka Jr., she believes Saint Tail to be a romantic rival and begins harassing Meimi once she suspects that they may actually be the same person. Wanting to protect Meimi from her, Asuka Jr. agrees to a bet with Takamiya that if her suspicions are correct and Meimi is actually Saint Tail, Asuka Jr. will have to begin dating Takamiya, whereas if she turns out to be wrong, she will stop harassing Meimi. Saint Tail manages to trick Takamiya into believing her to be a cross-dressing adult man, resulting in her admitting her "loss" of the bet, leaving Meimi alone, and staying out of the Saint Tail cases for some time.
After witnessing Asuka Jr. hesitate in capturing Saint Tail, she tries to have Morinaka take him off of the Saint Tail cases, believing that doing so will remove the biggest obstacle to him paying attention to her. However, Asuka Jr. manages to pass the test that Morinaka gives him, forcing Takamiya to realize that nothing will be able to dissuade him from pursuing Saint Tail. Once Asuka Jr. and Meimi formally enter a romantic relationship, she ultimately decides to accept it and give them her support. Eight years later, she becomes a police officer and remains unaware of Saint Tail's identity.
Manato Sawatari (佐渡 真人, Sawatari Manato)
Voiced by: Toshiyuki Morikawa (Japanese); Jason Spisak (English)
A member of St. Paulia's journalism club and a photographer who prioritizes sensationalism over accuracy when making his articles. Due to his proactive nature in looking for "scoops", he is well-informed about local gossip and thus sometimes provides useful information for Saint Tail's heists; however, because he holds a grudge against Saint Tail for having humiliated him during one of her heists, he often writes articles that slander her with baseless accusations. Although he is popular with girls in school for his good looks, he falls in love with Meimi when she pretends to show interest in his photography skills while trying to get information out of him; his attempts at aggressively flirting with her make her uncomfortable, earning Asuka Jr.'s ire on her behalf and eventually inducing jealousy at the idea of Sawatari's actions potentially taking her away from him.
He eventually also takes an interest in Seira after bonding with her and considers pursuing her more seriously after Meimi begins dating Asuka Jr., but soon realizes that a relationship with her would be impossible due to her need to stay celibate. Nevertheless, he feels sympathy for her restricted lifestyle as a nun and decides to take her out on a date and give her presents to make her happy. Eight years later, he becomes a professional journalist and also remains unaware of Saint Tail's identity.
Ryoko (涼子, Ryōko) and Kyoko (恭子, Kyōko)
Voiced by: Satomi Koorogi (Japanese); Mona Marshall (English)^{Ep. 1} (Ryoko)
Voiced by: Junko Iwao (Japanese); Michelle Ruff (English)^{Ep. 1} (Kyoko)
Two of Meimi's classmates. In the anime, Asuka Jr. briefly challenges them to try and catch Saint Tail themselves, resulting in an ill-fated attempt that ends up strengthening their friendship in the process.
Yasuhiro (靖広, Yasuhiro) and Chiba (千葉, Chiba)
Voiced by: Yasuhiro Takato^{Ep. 39} (Yasuhiro)
Voiced by: Isshin Chiba^{Ep. 39} (Chiba)
Two of Asuka Jr.'s classmates who often accompany him.

=== Haneoka family ===
Eimi (left) and Genichiro (right)

Eimi Haneoka (羽丘 映美, Haneoka Eimi)
Voiced by: Chieko Enomoto (Japanese); Melora Harte (English)^{Ep. 1}
Meimi's mother, a housewife, was once a phantom thief known as Phantom Thief Lucifer (怪盗ルシファー, Kaitō Rushifā). During her phantom thief days, she had stolen in order to satisfy her desire to test her skills and to compete with her rival Rosemary; however, after meeting Genichiro, his kindness made her decide to change, return everything she had stolen, and retire. Although she wants Meimi to take after her, she believes that Meimi "wouldn't do anything bad" and only wants her to take after her in physical abilities instead of being a phantom thief.
Genichiro Haneoka (羽丘 源一郎, Haneoka Gen'ichirō)
Voiced by: Kazuhiko Inoue (Japanese); Steven Jay Blum (English)^{Ep. 1}
Meimi's father and a professional stage magician. He met Eimi when she was on the run from the police and helped hide her with his magic tricks, treating her with unconditional love despite her background as a thief. He is the one who taught Meimi how to do stage magic and hopes that she will follow in his footsteps as a magician; however, he had instructed her not to show anyone her magic until she became a full-fledged magician and is thus unaware of her activities as Saint Tail.
Ruby (ルビィ, Rubī)
Voiced by: Satomi Kohrogi (Japanese); Brianne Siddall (English)^{Ep. 1}
A hedgehog whom Meimi had bonded with at a pet shop and had been planning to buy before she ends up being bought by one of Saint Tail's heist targets. After her new owner is arrested for fraud, Meimi decides to take her in. Her name "Ruby" comes from the ruby gemstone in the engagement ring Genichiro had given Eimi. She is affectionate with Meimi and very intelligent, providing useful support to Saint Tail during her heists.

=== Other characters ===
Tomoki Asuka (飛鳥 友貴, Asuka Tomoki)
Voiced by: Akio Ōtsuka (Japanese); Richard Cansino (English)^{Ep. 1}
Asuka Jr.'s father, a police detective who had pursued Lucifer in the past. Asuka Jr. joins the Saint Tail cases specifically because he considers his father to be too "incompetent" for the job. In the anime, he appears to assist his son on cases and arrest any criminals she exposes.
Hideo Morinaka (森中 秀雄, Morinaka Hideo)
Voiced by: Hidetoshi Nakamura (Japanese); Mike Reynolds (English)^{Ep. 1}
The mayor of Seika City and Takamiya's uncle. He is in charge of Asuka Jr.'s appointment in the Saint Tail cases and also allows Takamiya to join at her request; while he initially considers taking Asuka Jr. off the case after Takamiya accuses him of being unmotivated, he allows him to stay on after he is able to prove himself.
Maju Sendo (仙道 真珠, Sendō Maju)
Voiced by: Mika Kanai^{Ep. 40}
A thief who runs a fortune-telling shop named "Pandora" that actually serves as a front to get her clients to hand over their goods via hypnosis. As Rosemary's adoptive daughter and accomplice, she assists her with her revenge on Lucifer by identifying Meimi as Saint Tail and using hypnosis to induce her to confess all of her guilt about deceiving Asuka Jr., thus revealing him to be her greatest weakness. She then uses her hypnosis on the townspeople to make Saint Tail into a scapegoat for her own thefts and helps Rosemary expose Saint Tail's identity to Asuka Jr. before kidnapping him. Eventually, after a brief struggle with Saint Tail, she follows her mother in finding more towns to pillage.
Kabako Sendo (仙道 椛子, Sendō Kabako)
Voiced by: Naoko Kouda^{Ep. 41}
A phantom thief known as Phantom Thief Rosemary (怪盗ローズマリー, Kaitō Rōzumarī), as well as Eimi's rival during her days as Lucifer. Her specialty is using jade powder to induce hallucinations or put people to sleep. She adopted and trained Maju as a thief, and the two of them travel around towns to steal from their inhabitants and live in luxury. She holds a grudge against Lucifer for broadcasting her real name in public via one of her calling cards, as she finds her given name "Kabako" to be embarrassing.
She and Maju arrive in Seika in the hopes of vengeance on Lucifer, but after learning that Eimi is retired, she decides to enact her revenge on Saint Tail instead. After Meimi accidentally uses her real name on her calling card, Rosemary retaliates by revealing her identity to Asuka Jr. and kidnapping him. When Saint Tail arrives to rescue him, Rosemary takes an interest in her skills as a thief and offers to adopt her so she can join her and Maju in stealing for luxury, but Saint Tail refuses; eventually, after witnessing Asuka Jr. reuniting with Meimi and showing her unconditional love, Rosemary expresses wistfulness at the idea of having met someone like him twenty years earlier and decides to leave town with Maju.
