= Kōsuke Okano =

Japanese voice actor

- 岡野 浩介
- Born: Tokyo, Japan
- Occupation: Voice actor
- Years active: 1994–present
- Agent: SSP

Kōsuke Okano (岡野 浩介, Okano Kōsuke) is a Japanese voice actor. He was born in Tokyo, and is often featured on Japanese anime television network ANIMAX as narrator along with fellow voice actor Yukari Tamura.

== Filmography ==
=== Television animation ===
- Asuka Jr. in Saint Tail (1995)
- Maeno in Ping-Pong Club (1995)
- Recca Hanabishi in Flame of Recca (1997)
- Kuki Jr. in Grander Musashi RV (1998)
- Kaname Takasato, Aozaru in Twelve Kingdoms (2002)
- Usop, Vincent in Midnight Horror School (2002)
- Hot Rod (Hot Shot) in Transformers: Armada (2003)
- Sokan Watabe in Sensei no Ojikan (2004)
- Yashima-sama in Kamichu! (2005)
- Mahiro Atori in Hiiro no Kakera (2012)
- Cameramon in Digimon Universe: Appli Monsters (2016)

==== Unknown date ====
- Taichi Miyamoto in Bleach
- Haguruma in Boruto: Naruto Next Generations
- Tsukado in Naruto Shippuden
- Russell Tringum in Fullmetal Alchemist
- Noboru Yoshikawa in Great Teacher Onizuka
- Kenta Nakamura in Initial D
- Daisuke Hayami in Rockman EXE
- Hotshot in Transformers Animated
- Rikichi Yamada in Nintama Rantarou
- Current Okeanos in Saint Seiya Episode.G drama CDs
- Yusaku Tsunemura in Baka and Test (second season)

=== Original video animation ===
- Captain Tsubasa: Holland Youth (1994) (Makoto Soda)
- Yamato 2520 (1995) (Carl)
- Sokan Watabe in Sensei no Ojikan

=== Theatrical animation ===
- Crayon Shin-chan: The Storm Called: The Adult Empire Strikes Back (2001) (A sake dealer)
- Nintama Rantarō: Invincible Master of the Dokutake Ninja (2024) (Yamada Rikichi)

=== Video games ===
- Metalman and Shadowman in Super Adventure Rockman (1998)
- Reiji Azuma/Zwei in Phantom of Inferno (2000)
- Werner Blues (Brett Varner) in Growlanser II: The Sense of Justice (2001)
- Mahiro Atori in Hiiro no Kakera (2006)
- PlayStation Move Heroes (2011) (Lunk)

=== Drama CDs ===
- Abunai series 2: Abunai Summer Vacation (????)
- Baito wa Maid!? (????) (Yuuya Tamura)
- Daisuki (????) (Yoshida)
- GENE Tenshi wa Sakareru (????) (Arche Yan)
- Kageki series 5: Kageki ni Tengoku (????) (angel 3)
- Last Order (????) (Yoshihiro Shiho)
- Naguru Hakui no Tenshi (????) (Tomoki Igarashi)
- Rijichou-sama no Okiniiri (????) (Rentarou Kashiwagi)
- Romantist Taste (????) (Kazuma Ehara)

=== Dubbing ===
==== Live-action ====
- The Faculty (Casey Connor (Elijah Wood))
- The Hangover Part II (Leslie Chow (Ken Jeong))
- The Hangover Part III (Leslie Chow (Ken Jeong))
- Monkeybone (Herb (Dave Foley))
- Mr. & Mrs. Smith (2008 NTV edition) (Benjamin "The Tank" Danz (Adam Brody))
- The O.C. (Seth Cohen (Adam Brody))
- Power Rangers In Space (Seymour)
- Power Rangers Mystic Force (Xander Bly/Green Mystic Ranger (Richard Brancatisano))
- Power Rangers Samurai (Negatron)
- The Quick and the Dead (1997 TV Asahi edition) (Fee 'The Kid' Herod (Leonardo DiCaprio))
- Road Trip (Barry Manilow (Tom Green))
- Scooby-Doo (Scrappy Doo (Scott Innes))
- White Squall (Shay Jennings (Jason Marsden))

==== Animation ====
- Atomic Betty (Sparky)
- Courage the Cowardly Dog (The Nowhere Newsman & Di-Lung)
- Dexter's Laboratory (Major Glory)
- Oscar's Oasis (Suricates)
- Recess (Butch)
- Spider-Man (Cletus Kasady/Carnage)
