= Saint Seiya: Episode.G =

Japanese manga series

- Seventh tankōbon volume cover, featuring the protagonist, Leo Gold Saint Aiolia, along with most of the Titans

聖闘士星矢(セイントセイヤ) EPISODE.G (Seinto Seiya Episōdo Jī)
- Created by: Masami Kurumada
- Manga
- Written by: Megumu Okada
- Published by: Akita Shoten
- Imprint: Champion Red Comics
- Magazine: Champion Red; Champion Red Ichigo (Note: Only chapters from volume 0.)
- Original run: December 19, 2002 – June 19, 2013
- Volumes: 21 (Note: Including volume 0.)
- Manga

Saint Seiya: Episode.G – Assassin
- Written by: Megumu Okada
- Published by: Akita Shoten
- Imprint: Champion Red Comics
- Magazine: Champion Red Ichigo (2014); Manga Cross (2015–19)
- Original run: April 5, 2014 – August 27, 2019
- Volumes: 16
- Manga

Saint Seiya: Episode.G – Requiem
- Written by: Megumu Okada
- Published by: Akita Shoten
- Imprint: Champion Red Comics
- Magazine: Manga Cross
- Original run: January 28, 2020 – present
- Volumes: 9

Saint Seiya: Episode.G (Japanese: 聖闘士星矢(セイントセイヤ) EPISODE.G, Hepburn: Seinto Seiya Episōdo Jī) is a Japanese manga series written and illustrated by Megumu Okada. A spin-off of the manga series Saint Seiya by Masami Kurumada, it first started being serialized in the monthly magazine Champion Red on December 19, 2002, and was concluded on June 19, 2013, being later compiled into 20 tankōbon by Akita Shoten.

The story is set seven years before the events of Saint Seiya and six years after the death of the Sagittarius Gold Saint Aiolos, the brother of Episode.G's protagonist, Leo Gold Saint Aiolia. It takes place in a fictional universe where the Olympian gods cyclically reincarnate on Earth, often waging war on each other for dominance, and depicts the battle of the Gold Saints, warriors with superhuman powers who fight for Peace and Justice in the name of the goddess Athena to protect the Earth from the recently awakened Titan gods.

Although no English version of Saint Seiya Episode.G exists, it has been translated into various other languages by publishers from around the world, where it was well received, but not without controversy regarding its differences to Saint Seiya.

In December 2013, Megumu Okada announced on Twitter that he was working on a sequel manga titled Saint Seiya: Episode.G – Assassin (Japanese: 聖闘士星矢EPISODE.G～アサシン～, Hepburn: Seinto Seiya Episōdo Jī Asashin). Serialization began on April 5, 2014, in the bimonthly Champion Red Ichigo magazine, and continued in the web magazine Champion Cross (later renamed Manga Cross). The last chapter was published on August 27, 2019, and the series was compiled into 16 volumes. A second sequel titled Saint Seiya: Episode.G – Requiem (Japanese: 聖闘士星矢EPISODE.Gレクイエム, Hepburn: Seinto Seiya Episōdo Jī Rekuiemu) began being serialized on January 28, 2020, also in Manga Cross.

== Plot ==
The story of Saint Seiya Episode.G is set seven years before the events of Masami Kurumada's Saint Seiya, in the same fictional world in which the Greek gods cyclically reincarnate to dispute dominion of Earth. The story revolves around the Saints of Athena, humans with superhuman powers who are devoted to the Goddess of War Athena, and whose duty is to protect the world from evil. The protagonist is the Leo Gold Saint Aiolia, who is mistrusted by the rest of the Saints because of the seemingly traitorous actions of his brother Aiolos in the past. In turn, he holds a grudge against the Saints as a whole, and against the elite order of the Gold Saints in particular.

While the Pope, the leader of the Saints, sends Aiolia on mission after mission to prove his loyalty, evil forces manifest that threaten to destroy Sanctuary, the home of the Saints. A modern-day Titanomachy begins as the Titans, ancient gods with a desire for revenge on the Olympian gods, attack Sanctuary to retrieve the "Megas Drepanon", the weapon into which Zeus had sealed their King, Kronos, in the age of mythology. Their first assault is thwarted by Aiolia, who subsequently gains the attention of the Titans as the "man of the evil omen" who is destined to free their King.

With the Titans once again roaming the Earth, ancient monsters are also resurrected worldwide and the Saints have to contain them. Meanwhile, the Titans gather their forces to strike at Sanctuary a second time. In the course of their next assault, Kronos is inadvertently released from Zeus's lightning seal by Aiolia's own lightning-based technique, but the god appears to be amnesiac. The Titans determine that it was Aiolia's attack that was responsible for this condition and that the Leo Saint might hold the means to fix it as well. They retreat to their base at the Time Labyrinth and kidnap Aiolia's servant Lithos to lure him there. Aiolia does not hesitate to go to Lithos's aid and, together with five other Gold Saints, initiates a series of battles in which the Titans fall one by one.

Throughout these battles, the primordial god Pontos, who first released the Titans from their imprisonment in Tartarus and initially claimed that he wished to help Kronos, reveals his true intentions, stating that he only revived the Titans as part of a larger plan and has been playing them in order to awaken his true mistress, Gaia. He means to help her take control of the Earth, destroying gods and humans alike in the process. Pontos's plan ultimately fails as, after fighting Aiolia, Kronos comes to appreciate the worth of humans. The Titan King robs Gaia of his power, offering it to Hades instead so that the Saints of Athena and his followers will be spared from death.

== Production ==
In the author commentary page published with the first volume, Megumu Okada explained that he had concerns about taking on the project because he had never written anything that was related to a pre-existing original work and because Saint Seiya was such a renowned piece. Original author Masami Kurumada left him free to write the story that would act as a prequel to the original manga. This resulted in a manga that is, visually, substantially different from its predecessor: character designs are slim and androgynous and details are enhanced to an extreme.

== Media ==
=== Manga ===
The first images of the manga appeared in the Champion Red magazine issue of January 2003, published on November 19, 2002, along with posters by and an interview with Masami Kurumada. The first chapter was then released on the following February issue of this monthly magazine, published on December 19, 2002, and the first tankōbon volume published on June 19, 2003, under Akita Shoten's Champion Red Comics imprint. Releases arrested in 2009, as author Megumu Okada put the manga on hiatus to dedicate himself to other projects following an unspecified dispute with the publisher, and resumed in Champion Red Ichigo's April 2011 issue, with the release of a new chapter, as well as a compilation of past chapters that had not been grouped in volume format yet (chapters 74–76) called "Volume 17.5". The manga entered a second hiatus after chapter 83 was published in the October 2011 issue of Champion Red Ichigo and, after the publisher announced that the manga would end at volume 20, resumed in the May 2013 issue. The final chapter was released on June 19, 2013; the final volume was published on August 8, 2013.

Saint Seiya Episode.G has yet to be licensed in English, but it has been published in several countries outside Japan: in Brazil, by Conrad Editora; by Panini Comics in Italy, Germany and France; Glénat in Spain; Editorial Ivrea in Argentina; Editorial Kamite in Mexico; and by Chuang Yi in Singapore.

==== Special chapters ====
The volumes usually contain short special chapters (gaiden), most of which in color, that tell little side-stories or highlight moments from previous chapters. Some have little relevance to the overall plot of Episode.G, with characters that play little part in the main story but who are well known to readers of Saint Seiya, while others explore the personality or the past of important characters and detail minor events pertaining to the plot.

Champion Red serialized a short side-story along with the regular chapters between October 2007 and January 2008. It takes place a few years before the main plot and details the exploits of Sagittarius Aiolos in Egypt, revealing some plot points that influence the main story. A younger Aiolia and Galan also appear. This side-story appears compiled in a special volume called "Volume 0: Aiolos" (アイオロス編, Aiorosu hen), released on May 20, 2008, which also contains an encyclopedia with information on all the Episode.G manga published up to that date.

==== Special editions ====
In Japan, there are two versions of the Saint Seiya Episode.G volumes. One is the normal version and the other is a limited edition. The limited edition features different covers and includes various goodies packaged with the comic books. These goodies include postcards, pins, a coin key holder, a day planner, tarot cards, a T-shirt, puzzles, calendars, a pass case and a key chain. A bust figure of the protagonist, Leo Aiolia, has also been released.

=== Drama CDs ===
Two drama CDs were recorded for Episode.G. One was released with the Champion Red issue of April 2007 and the other along with the limited edition of volume 11. These CDs reproduce the events of several chapters with only slight modifications that reduce the cast: Aiolia's battle against the Giant in volume 1, Pontos's test of Aiolia through Galan from volume 1, and Camus's and Aiolia's fight against Okeanos from volumes 9 and 10. Voice actors include: Hiro Shimono as Leo Aiolia, Hikaru Midorikawa as Aquarius Camus, Kōji Yusa as Galan, Chiwa Saitō as Lithos, Kōsuke Okano as Okeanos and Hiroki Yasumoto as Pontos.

=== Sequels ===
==== Saint Seiya Episode.G: Assassin ====
In December 2013, Megumu Okada announced via Twitter that he was working on a sequel manga titled Saint Seiya Episode.G: Assassin. The first chapter was published on April 5, 2014, in the 43rd issue of the bimonthly magazine Champion Red Ichigo, after a short prologue was released in the Champion Red issue of February 2014 commemorating the 40 year anniversary of Masami Kurumada's career.

After Champion Red Ichigo ceased publication in August 2014, the series was continued in Akita Shoten's web magazine Champion Cross, later renamed Manga Cross. With the change in venue, the chapters started being published entirely in colour.

The final chapter was published on August 27, 2019. The chapters were compiled into 16 volumes, some of which include bonus chapters. The first volume was published on October 20, 2014, and the last on December 20, 2019. A special epilogue was published in Champion RED's March 2020 issue.

Episode.G: Assassin includes original characters, characters from the first Saint Seiya manga and also from its sequel, Saint Seiya: Next Dimension.

==== Saint Seiya Episode.G: Requiem ====
A second sequel, the conclusion of the Episode.G series, titled Saint Seiya Episode.G: Requiem, began serialization on January 28, 2020, in the online manga magazine Manga Cross.

== Reception ==
The manga was well received in France, where volumes 7, 8 and 9 sold thirty-one thousand copies each in 2006. Sales in Italy were equally successful, having been featured on multiple occasions in Planet Manga's Top 10 sales charts between June 2005 and February 2010.

French critic Thomas Berthelon, writing for Actua BD, makes a note on the unoriginality of the plot. While the manga is full of references to Saint Seiya, the story is based on the same known schemes and the characters are too similar to the protagonists of the original series. The critic writing for Manga-News also notes that the exchanges between Saints and Titans can become repetitive. Meanwhile, for Brazilian critic Pedro Hunter of Omelete, Episode.G sets itself apart from the usual shōnen manga by not featuring only endless battles and undeveloped storylines. He finds the way Okada depicts his characters as an integrating part of the real world particularly interesting and highlights the inclusion of real life events like the Three Mile Island accident into the plot.

The critic writing for Manga-News regrets that the manga focuses on the youth of the known Gold Saints from Kurumada's work. This reviewer says that it takes away all suspense from the story, since the fates of the main characters are known from the start to any who have read Saint Seiya beforehand, and that the magnitude of the accomplishments of these characters in Episode.G is inconsistent with what was seen in the original series. In a later review, however, it is also noted that Episode.G retains the spirit of the original series, successfully portraying the emotions present in battles between warriors who can respect their opponents and admire their willingness to give their lives for what they believe is right.

Generally praised as "impressive" is Okada's graphical skill, his use of composition and textures which enhance the divine aspects of the characters, although critics also note that the heavy amount of detail in a black and white manga often interferes with readability. Berthelon considers such difficulty reminiscent of passages from Kaori Yuki's manga Angel Sanctuary and recommends the manga for its "astonishing" artwork.
