= Megumu Okada =

Japanese manga artist

- 岡田 芽武
- Born: 15 March 1971 (age 55); Tokyo, Japan
- Occupations: Manga artist, manga writer, filmmaker
- Notable work: Shadow Skill; Saint Seiya: Episode.G
- Website: Megumu Okada Official Homepage

Megumu Okada (岡田芽武, Okada Megumu; born 15 March 1971, in Tokyo) is a Japanese manga artist, best known as the creator of the series Shadow Skill and its spin-offs (1992 to 2014). He is also known for Nirai Kanai (1999), Saint Seiya: Episode.G (2002–2013), Oboro (2001), Fair Plays (2001–2002), and Hitotsuki! (2009).

== Career ==
Okada worked on Shadow Skill from 1992 to 1996 and Shadow Skill: Phantom of Shade - Black Howling - Black Wing from 1997 to 1998. The series was later continued by Kodansha from 2000 to 2014 and consisted of a total of 11 volumes.

In 1994, Okada collaborated with artist Ranmaru Tenma to create Gensou Sekai Eiyuretsuden Shinobi Zard. Two years later, the pair produced Gensou Sekai Eiyuretsuden Wiz Buster. In 1999, Okada created the manga Nirai Kanai, serialized in Monthly Afternoon. The series, with its six volumes, lasted until 2003.

In 2001, Okada wrote and illustrated Oboro. From 2001 to 2002, he collaborated again with Tenma on Fair Plays, serialised in Comic BonBon, and, in 2002, he began work on Saint Seiya Episode.G (a spin-off of Masami Kurumada's Saint Seiya), which was serialised in Champion Red and spanned 20 volumes.

In 2009, Okada published Hitotsuki!, illustrated by Tenma, releasing it as a single volume.

== Notable works ==
- Okada, Megumu. 1999. Niraikanai (ニライカナイ 遙かなる根の国, Nirai Kanai: Harukanaru Ne no Kuni). Serialized in Monthly Afternoon. Published by Kodansha. 6 volumes, completed in 2002.
- Okada, Megumu. 1992–1996. Shadow Skill. Serialized in Comic Gamma. Published by Takeshobo. 4 volumes.
- Okada, Megumu. 1997–1998. Shadow Skill: Phantom of Shade - Black Howling - Black Wing. Published by Fujimi Shobo. Continued by Kodansha from 2000–2014 in Afternoon Season Zōkan and Monthly Afternoon. 11 volumes.
- Okada, Megumu. 2002. Saint Seiya: Episode.G (聖闘士星矢(セイントセイヤ) EPISODE.G, Seinto Seiya Episōdo Jī). Based on Masami Kurumada's Saint Seiya. Serialized in Champion Red. Published by Akita Shoten. 20 volumes.
- Okada, Megumu. 1994. Gensou Sekai Eiyuretsuden Shinobi Zard (幻想世界英雄烈伝 忍ザード, Gensō Sekai Eiyūretsuden Shinobi Zādo). Story by Okada, art by Ranmaru Tenma. Serialized in Comic Gamma. Published by Takeshobo. 1 volume.
- Okada, Megumu. 1996. Gensou Sekai Eiyuretsuden Wiz Buster (幻想世界魔法烈伝 WIZバスター, Gensō Sekai Eiyūretsuden Wiz Basutā). Story by Okada, art by Ranmaru Tenma. Serialized in Monthly Shōnen Gangan. Published by Square Enix. 1 volume.
- Okada, Megumu. 2001. Oboro (朧). Serialized in Comic Dragon. Published by Kadokawa Shoten. 1 volume.
- Okada, Megumu. 2001–2002. Fair Plays (幻想世界英雄烈伝フェアプレイズ, Gensō Sekai Eiyūretsuden Fea Pureizu). Story by Okada, art by Ranmaru Tenma. Serialized in Comic BomBom. Published by Kodansha. 1 volume.
- Okada, Megumu. 2009. Hitotsuki! (ひとつキ!). Story by Okada, art by Ranmaru Tenma. Serialized in Champion Red. Published by Akita Shoten. 1 volume.
