= List of Saint Seiya manga volumes =

This is a list of manga volumes in the Saint Seiya media franchise. The first series was written and drawn by Masami Kurumada and was published by Shueisha in the Japanese-language magazine Weekly Shōnen Jump, from January 1986 to December 1990, and compiled into 28 tankōbon volumes.

The first eighteen volumes of the manga series were adapted into a 114-episode anime series by Toei Animation, while a series of OVAs adapted the Hades arc in thirty-one episodes. The series was rereleased several times in different volumes format since 1996. Saint Seiya is licensed for English language release in North America by Viz Media. Viz released the first collected volume of the series on January 21, 2004, and the last one on February 2, 2010.

In addition to the main series, there have been several spin-off series. In 2002, a new manga called Saint Seiya Episode.G about the youth of the Gold Saints started being serialized. It was written and drawn by Megumu Okada, under the authorization of Masami Kurumada. The individual chapters were published in Akita Shoten's Champion Red and later compiled into twenty volumes. In 2014, a sequel to Episode.G titled Saint Seiya Episode.G - Assassin started being serialized. In 2006, two other prequel manga series started being published, telling the story of the Holy War against Hades that took place in the 18th century, 250 years before the original series in the Saint Seiya universe. Both manga are published in Akita Shoten's Shōnen Champion magazine. The first one, named Saint Seiya: Next Dimension is drawn and written by Masami Kurumada, but released at irregular intervals. The second, Saint Seiya: The Lost Canvas, is written and drawn by Shiori Teshirogi, under the authorization of Kurumada. In 2014, manga artist Chimaki Kuori started a new spin-off manga titled Saint Seiya: Saintia Shō, which is serialised in Champion Red.

== Saint Seiya ==
No.	Title	Original release date	English release date
1	Holy Warriors; Athena's Saints (女神の聖闘士 Atena no Seinto)	September 10, 1986; 4-08-851754-7	January 21, 2004; 1-59116-225-4
2	Axia! Death Match! Pegasus vs. Dragon (死闘！天馬対龍 Shitō! Pegasasu tai Doragon)	January 9, 1987; 4-08-851755-5	March 24, 2004; 1-59116-226-2
3	Mu's Palace; Phoenix, the Warrior from Hell (フェニックス!地獄よりの戦士 Fenikkusu! Jigoku Yori no Senshi)	March 10, 1987; 4-08-851756-3	May 19, 2004; 1-59116-299-8
4	Remembering the Rage; Bloodbath! The Black Cloth (血戦!暗黒聖衣 Ketsusen! Burakku Kurosu)	May 8, 1987; 4-08-851757-1	July 14, 2004; 1-59116-335-8
5	Burn, Phoenix! Silver Saint: The Gorgeous Assassin (白銀聖衣!美しき抹殺者 Shirubā Seinto! Utsukushiki Hittoman)	July 10, 1987; 4-08-851758-X	September 7, 2004; 1-59116-470-2
6	Fight for Athena; Tatakae! Atena no Moto de (戦え!女神のもとで)	September 10, 1987; 4-08-851759-8	November 15, 2004; 1-59116-525-3
7	For a Wonderful Future; Clash! The Gold Cloth (激突!黄金聖衣 Gekitotsu! Gōrudo Kurosu)	November 10, 1987; 4-08-851760-1	January 4, 2005; 1-59116-616-0
8	The 12 Palaces; Sanctuary's Twelve Palaces (聖域!十二の宮殿 Sankuchuari! Jūni no Kyūden)	January 8, 1988; 4-08-851761-X	March 1, 2005; 1-59116-715-9
9	For My Goddess; Waga Megami no Tameni (我が女神のために)	March 10, 1988; 4-08-851762-8	May 3, 2005; 1-59116-786-8
10	The Man Closest to Godhood; Shaka, the Man Closest to Godhood (シャカ!神に近い男 Shaka! Kami ni Chikai Otoko)	May 10, 1988; 4-08-851763-6	July 5, 2005; 1-59116-851-1
11	The Absolute Zero; Young Men! To You I Entrust Athena (少年たちよ!女神を託す Shōnen Tachi yo! Atena wo Takusu)	July 8, 1988; 4-08-851764-4	September 6, 2005; 1-59116-993-3
12	Man with Two Faces; Death Match in the Pope's Chamber (教皇の間の死闘 Kyōkō no ma no Shitō)	September 9, 1988; 4-08-851765-2	November 8, 2005; 1-4215-0117-1
13	Athena Revives; Atena Fukkatsu (女神復活)	November 10, 1988; 4-08-851766-0	January 3, 2006; 1-4215-0236-4
14	Temple Under the Sea; The Coronation of Emperor Poseidon (戴冠!海皇ポセイドン! Taikan!! Kaiō Poseidon)	January 10, 1989; 4-08-851767-9	March 7, 2006; 1-4215-0418-9
15	Deadly Battle; Undersea Temple! The Seven Pillars (海底神殿!七本の柱 Kaitei Shinden! Nanahon no Hashira)	March 10, 1989; 4-08-851768-7	June 2, 2006; 1-4215-0656-4
16	The Heart Hunter; Kokoro no Karyūdo (心の狩人)	May 10, 1989; 4-08-851769-5	July 5, 2006; 1-4215-0659-9
17	Athena's prayer Athena's Prayers Reverberate (響け!女神の祈り Hibike! Atena no Inori)	July 10, 1989; 4-08-851770-9	September 5, 2006; 1-4215-0660-2
18	Beyond the Blue Waves; Aoki Hatō no Hate (蒼き波涛の果て)	September 8, 1989; 4-08-851533-1	November 7, 2006; 1-4215-0661-0
19	Hades' Rebirth; Resurrection! Hades' 108 Evil Stars (復活!ハーデス百八の魔星 Fukkatsu!! Hādesu Hyaku-hachi no Masei)	November 10, 1989; 4-08-851534-X	February 6, 2007; 1-4215-0662-9
20	The Death Land; Fierce Fight of the Zodiac (激闘!十二宮 Gekitō! Jūnikyū)	January 10, 1990; 4-08-851535-8	June 5, 2007; 1-4215-1082-0
21	108 Stars; Under the Sal Trees (沙羅双樹の下に Sarasōju no Shita ni)	March 9, 1990; 4-08-851536-6	October 2, 2007; 1-4215-1083-9
22	The Eighth Sense; Awaken the Eight Sense! (めざめよ!エイトセンシズ Mezameyo! Eito Senshizu)	May 10, 1990; 4-08-851537-4	February 5, 2008; 1-4215-1084-7
23	The Acheron Crossing; Hell's Gate of Despair (冥界・絶望の門 Meikai Zetsubō no Mon)	July 10, 1990; 4-08-851538-2	June 3, 2008; 978-1-4215-1085-9
24	The Sixth Ring; The Birth of Hades' Soul (冥王!魂の降誕 Hādesu! Tamashii no Kōtan)	September 10, 1990; 4-08-851539-0	October 7, 2008; 1-4215-1086-3
25	Dire Battle; Greatest Eclipse (グレイテスト·エクリップス Gureitesuto Ekurippusu)	November 9, 1990; 4-08-851540-4	February 3, 2009; 1-4215-2409-0
26	The Pursuit of Hades; The Way to Elysion (エリシオンへの道 Erishion e no Michi)	January 10, 1991; 4-08-851788-1	June 2, 2009; 1-4215-2410-4
27	Thanatos and Hypnos; Tanatosu to Hyupunosu! (死と眠り！)	March 8, 1991; 4-08-851789-X	October 6, 2009; 1-4215-2411-2
28	To a World Brimming Over with light..! Hikari Afureru Sekai e...! (光あふれる世界へ…！)	April 10, 1991; 4-08-851790-3	February 2, 2010; 1-4215-2412-0

== Saint Seiya: Episode.G ==
No.	Japanese release date	Japanese ISBN
0	May 20, 2008	978-4-253-23110-7
1	June 19, 2003	4-253-23111-X; ISBN 978-4-253-18150-1 (limited edition)
2	October 23, 2003	4-253-23112-8; ISBN 978-4-253-18153-2 (limited edition)
3	February 19, 2004	4-253-23113-6; ISBN 978-4-253-18154-9 (limited edition)
4	July 29, 2004	4-253-23114-4; ISBN 978-4-253-18159-4 (limited edition)
5	November 25, 2004	4-253-23115-2; ISBN 978-4-253-18160-0 (limited edition)
6	April 20, 2005	4-253-23116-0; ISBN 978-4-253-18163-1 (limited edition)
7	July 20, 2005	4-253-23117-9; ISBN 978-4-253-18164-8 (limited edition)
8	December 20, 2005	4-253-23118-7; ISBN 978-4-253-18165-5 (limited edition)
9	May 18, 2006	4-253-23119-5; ISBN 978-4-253-18166-2 (limited edition)
10	August 18, 2006	4-253-23120-9; ISBN 978-4-253-18167-9 (limited edition)
11	February 20, 2007	978-4-253-23125-1; ISBN 978-4-253-18168-6 (limited edition)
12	August 21, 2007	978-4-253-23126-8; ISBN 978-4-253-18169-3 (limited edition)
13	December 20, 2007	978-4-253-23127-5; ISBN 978-4-253-18170-9 (limited edition)
14	May 20, 2008	978-4-253-23128-2; ISBN 978-4-253-18171-6 (limited edition)
15	August 20, 2008	978-4-253-23129-9; ISBN 978-4-253-18172-3 (limited edition)
16	January 20, 2009	978-4-253-23130-5; ISBN 978-4-253-18174-7 (limited edition)
17	June 19, 2009	978-4-253-23134-3; ISBN 978-4-253-18175-4 (limited edition)
18	August 19, 2011	978-4-253-23135-0
19	December 20, 2011	978-4-253-23136-7
20	August 8, 2013	978-4-253-23140-4

No.	Japanese release date	Japanese ISBN
1	October 20, 2014	978-4-253-23531-0
2	February 20, 2015	978-4-253-23532-7
3	May 20, 2015	978-4-253-23533-4
4	August 20, 2015	978-4-253-23534-1
5	October 20, 2015	978-4-253-23535-8
6	March 18, 2016	978-4-253-23536-5
7	June 8, 2016	978-4-253-23537-2
8	September 20, 2016	978-4-253-23538-9
9	December 20, 2016	978-4-253-23539-6
10	June 20, 2017	978-4-253-23540-2
11	December 20, 2017	978-4-253-23836-6
12	May 8, 2018	978-4-253-23836-6
13	December 20, 2018	978-4-253-23838-0
14	January 18, 2019	978-4-253-23839-7
15	April 19, 2019	978-4-253-23840-3
16	December 20, 2019	978-4-253-23841-0

No.	Japanese release date	Japanese ISBN
1	April 20, 2020	978-4-253-23861-8
2	October 20, 2021	978-4-253-23862-5
3	March 17, 2022	978-4-253-23863-2
4	September 20, 2022	978-4-253-23864-9
5	April 20, 2023	978-4-253-23865-6
6	March 18, 2024	978-4-253-23866-3
7	March 18, 2025	978-4-253-23867-0
8	August 20, 2025	978-4-253-23868-7
9	February 19, 2026	978-4-253-01160-0

== Saint Seiya: Next Dimension ==
No.	Japanese release date	Japanese ISBN
1	February 6, 2009	978-4-253-13271-8
2	March 8, 2010	978-4-253-13272-5
3	December 8, 2010	978-4-253-13273-2
4	December 8, 2011	978-4-253-13274-9
5	April 6, 2012	978-4-253-13275-6
6	December 12, 2012	978-4-253-13276-3
7	August 8, 2013	978-4-253-13277-0
8	December 6, 2013	978-4-253-13278-7
9	June 20, 2014	978-4-253-13279-4
10	June 6, 2016	978-4-253-13280-0
11	September 7, 2017	978-4-253-13281-7
12	May 8, 2018	978-4-253-13282-4
13	June 8, 2021	978-4-253-13283-1
14	April 7, 2023	978-4-253-13284-8
15	May 8, 2024	978-4-253-13285-5
16	November 8, 2024	978-4-253-13286-2

== Saint Seiya: The Lost Canvas ==
No.	Japanese release date	Japanese ISBN
1	December 8, 2006	4-253-21221-2
2	March 8, 2007	978-4-253-21222-9
3	May 8, 2007	978-4-253-21223-6
4	July 7, 2007	978-4-253-21224-3
5	September 7, 2007	978-4-253-21225-0
6	November 8, 2007	978-4-253-21226-7
7	February 8, 2008	978-4-253-21227-4
8	April 8, 2008	978-4-253-21228-1
9	June 6, 2008	978-4-253-21229-8
10	August 8, 2008	978-4-253-21230-4
11	November 7, 2008	978-4-253-21511-4
12	February 6, 2009	978-4-253-21512-1
13	April 8, 2009	978-4-253-21513-8
14	June 8, 2009	978-4-253-21514-5
15	August 7, 2009	978-4-253-21515-2
16	October 8, 2009	978-4-253-21516-9
17	December 8, 2009	978-4-253-21517-6
18	March 8, 2010	978-4-253-21518-3
19	May 7, 2010	978-4-253-21519-0
20	July 8, 2010	978-4-253-21520-6
21	September 8, 2010	978-4-253-21539-8
22	December 8, 2010	978-4-253-21540-4
23	February 8, 2011	978-4-253-21641-8
24	April 8, 2011	978-4-253-21642-5
25	May 6, 2011	978-4-253-21643-2

No.	Title	Japanese release date	Japanese ISBN
1	Chapter One: Pisces	October 7, 2011	978-4-253-21644-9
2	Chapter Two: Scorpio	December 8, 2011	978-4-253-21645-6
3	Chapter Three: Aquarius	February 8, 2012	978-4-253-21646-3
4	Chapter Four: Cancer	April 6, 2012	978-4-253-21647-0
5	Chapter Five: Capricorn	July 6, 2012	978-4-253-21648-7
6	Chapter Six: Libra	December 7, 2012	978-4-253-21680-7
7	Chapter Seven: Leo	April 8, 2013	978-4-253-21681-4
8	Chapter Eight: Virgo	August 8, 2013	978-4-253-21682-1
9	Chapter Nine: Taurus	December 6, 2013	978-4-253-21683-8
10	Chapter Ten: Sagittarius	June 20, 2014	978-4-253-21684-5
11	Chapter Eleven: Gemini I	October 20, 2014	978-4-253-21685-2
12	Chapter Twelve: Gemini II	January 8, 2015	978-4-253-21686-9
13	Chapter Thirteen: Aries I	June 8, 2015	978-4-253-21687-6
14	Chapter Fourteen: Aries II	December 8, 2015	978-4-253-21688-3
15	Chapter Fifteen: The Old Twins	March 8, 2016	978-4-253-21689-0
16	Chapter Sixteen: The Old Twins II	June 8, 2016	978-4-253-21702-6

No.	Title	Japanese release date	Japanese ISBN
1	聖闘士星矢 THE LOST CANVAS 冥王神話 番外編	June 18, 2021	978-4-253-32041-2
2	聖闘士星矢 THE LOST CANVAS 冥王神話 番外編	April 20, 2026	978-4-253-01314-7

== Saint Seiya: Saintia Shō ==
No.	Original release date	Original ISBN	English release date	English ISBN
1	December 6, 2013	978-4-253-23593-8	February 20, 2018	978-1-626927-52-0
2	June 20, 2014	978-4-253-23594-5	May 22, 2018	978-1-626927-91-9
3	October 20, 2014	978-4-253-23595-2	October 21, 2018	978-1-626928-63-3
4	February 20, 2015	978-4-253-23596-9	November 27, 2018	978-1-626929-46-3
5	May 20, 2015	978-4-253-23597-6	February 19, 2019	978-1-626929-93-7
6	October 20, 2015	978-4-253-23598-3	May 21, 2019	978-1-642750-83-6
7	March 18, 2016	978-4-253-23599-0	August 6, 2019	978-1-642751-24-6
8	June 8, 2016	978-4-253-23600-3	November 5, 2019	978-1-642757-27-9
9	December 20, 2016	978-4-253-23601-0	March 17, 2020	978-1-64505-223-4
10	August 18, 2017	978-4-253-23602-7	May 5, 2020	978-1-64505-458-0
11	February 20, 2018	978-4-253-23881-6	August 4, 2020	978-1-64505-524-2
12	December 20, 2018	978-4-253-23882-3	February 9, 2021	978-1-64505-813-7
13	August 20, 2019	978-4-253-23883-0	May 25, 2021	978-1-64827-084-0
14	September 17, 2020	978-4-253-23884-7	September 7, 2021 (digital); September 14, 2021 (physical)	978-1-64827-292-9
15	April 20, 2021	978-4-253-23885-4	September 27, 2022 (digital); January 10, 2023 (physical)	978-1-63858-282-3
16	January 20, 2022	978-4-253-23886-1	January 17, 2023	978-1-63858-665-4
