= Sato (disambiguation) =

Sato or Satō is a Japanese surname.

Sato may also refer to:

== Places ==
- Sato, Kagoshima, a former town in Kagoshima Prefecture, Japan
- Sato, Tibet, a village

== People ==
- Ayami Sato (里 綾実; born 1989), Japanese baseball player
- Romain Sato (born 1981), Central African basketball player
- Sabrina Sato (born 1981), Brazilian television presenter
- "Mr. Sato", ring name for wrestler Akio Sato (wrestler)
- "Mr. Sato", ring name for wrestler Junzo Yoshinosato

=== Fictional characters ===
- Aholialili Sato, from the comic book Star Trek (2022 comic)
- Hoshi Sato, from the TV series Star Trek: Enterprise

== Other uses ==
- Sato (beverage), a beverage from Thailand
- Sato (dog), Puerto Rican term for street dogs and cats
- Sato (instrument), a bowed tanbur, or long-necked lute of Central Asian origin
- SATO (Lixil Group), a brand of toilet products for users of pit latrines
- Sato Kogyo, Japan's oldest construction contractor company
- Sato Pharmaceutical, a Japanese pharmaceutical company
- Sato Project, an organization that finds homes in the US for Puerto Rico's feral dogs
- Sato (supermarket), a Japanese supermarket
- "S.A.T.O.", a song from Ozzy Osbourne's 1981 album Diary of a Madman
- Sato Company, a Brazilian media company

== See also ==
- Satou Sabally (born 1998), German women's basketball player
