= Laelaps =

Laelaps may refer to:

- Laelaps (mythology), a Greek mythological dog
- Laelaps (mite), a mite genus
- Laelaps (dinosaur), or Dryptosaurus, a dinosaur genus
- Laelaps Suzuri, a fictional character in the manga series Saint Seiya: Dark Wing
