= Saint Seiya: The Lost Canvas =

Manga and anime series

- Saint Seiya: The Lost Canvas – The Myth of Hades
- Pegasus Tenma and Alone in the cover of the first volume.

聖闘士星矢(セイントセイヤ) The Lost Canvas 冥王神話 (Seinto Seiya Za Rosuto Kyanbasu Meiō Shinwa)
- Created by: Masami Kurumada
- Manga
- Written by: Shiori Teshirogi
- Published by: Akita Shoten
- Magazine: Weekly Shōnen Champion
- Original run: August 24, 2006 – April 6, 2011
- Volumes: 25
- Manga

Anecdotes
- Written by: Shiori Teshirogi
- Published by: Akita Shoten
- Magazine: Weekly Shōnen Champion (2011–12); Bessatsu Shōnen Champion (2012–16)
- Original run: May 19, 2011 – March 12, 2016
- Volumes: 16
- Manga

Extra Edition
- Written by: Shiori Teshirogi
- Published by: Akita Shoten
- Magazine: Champion Red
- Original run: Jun 18, 2021 – Feb 19, 2026
- Volumes: 1
- Original video animation
- Directed by: Osamu Nabeshima
- Written by: Yoshiyuki Suga
- Music by: Kaoru Wada
- Studio: TMS Entertainment
- Licensed by: NA: Discotek Media (home video); TMS Entertainment (streaming)
- Released: June 24, 2009 – July 20, 2011
- Episodes: 26
- icon

Saint Seiya: The Lost Canvas – The Myth of Hades (Japanese: 聖闘士星矢(セイントセイヤ) The Lost Canvas 冥王神話, Hepburn: Seinto Seiya Za Rosuto Kyanbasu Meiō Shinwa), also known as simply The Lost Canvas, is a Japanese manga series written and illustrated by Shiori Teshirogi. It is a spin-off based on the manga series Saint Seiya, which was created, written and illustrated by Japanese author Masami Kurumada. The Lost Canvas was published by Akita Shoten in the Weekly Shōnen Champion magazine since August 24, 2006, concluding after 223 chapters on April 6, 2011, with twenty-five tankōbon released. The story takes place in the 18th century, and focuses on an orphan known as Tenma who becomes one of the goddess Athena's 88 warriors known as Saints and finds himself in a war fighting against his best friend Alone who is revealed to be the reincarnation of Athena's biggest enemy, the Underworld God Hades.

The manga The Lost Canvas originated when Shiori Teshirogi's works attracted the attention of Saint Seiya author Masami Kurumada who gave her permission to write a prequel to his work while he was also writing his own prequel Saint Seiya: Next Dimension. Both Teshirogi and Kurumada often exchanged ideas that their works would have. Teshirogi in particular faced difficulties since she previously wrote shōjo manga and had to adapt her writing and artwork to the male demography. Teshirogi also started releasing a spin-off series from Lost Canvas two months after the main serialization ended. Titled Saint Seiya: The Lost Canvas – The Myth of Hades - Anecdotes (聖闘士星矢(セイントセイヤ) The Lost Canvas 冥王神話 外伝, Seinto Seiya Za Rosuto Kyanbasu - Meiō Shinwa Gaiden), the spin-off focuses on short stories related to several Saints before the events described in the main series. On April 23, 2012, it was announced in the Shōnen Champion magazine that The Lost Canvas was to change from a weekly to a monthly publication the following June, and shifting to the newly created magazine Bessatsu Shōnen Champion, supplementary to Shōnen Champion, resuming publishing of the remaining Anecdotes chapters in that date.

In June 2009, TMS Entertainment started adapting the manga in original video animation format, producing 26 episodes, which followed the source material closely and occasionally expanded on it with Teshirogi herself writing these new scenes.

Saint Seiya: The Lost Canvas was a commercial success in Japan, reaching a total of 6.7 million copies sold. Although the critics noted the manga uses heavy recycling characters from Saint Seiya, they believed a given a bigger appeal, most notably the Athena's twelve Gold Saints who play a major role in the narrative in contrast to the ones from the original series. While the plot was still felt simple, the artwork was still praised. The anime adaptation met similar responses by critics who enjoyed Tenma and Alone's relationship but still felt the aimed demography would be shocked to see apparent simplistic moves result into notably violent results. The fact that TMS Entertainment never concluded adapting the manga led to disappointment to its critics

== Plot ==
Saint Seiya: The Lost Canvas tells the story of the previous Holy War, taking place in the 18th century, 250 years before the original series, in the Saint Seiya universe. The story centers on the fight between Tenma, one of the 88 Saints following Athena, and Alone, the reincarnation of the God Hades. While the two were close childhood friends in Italy alongside Alone's sister, Sasha, the trio separated when Sagittarius Sisyphos recognized her as Athena. Sasha was sent first to the Sanctuary and then, a short time later, Tenma was sent to the Sanctuary too; while Tenma had the Cosmos, the Saints' energy, awaken, his talent was recognized by the Saint Libra Dohko who sends him to become the Bronze Saint. As years passes, everything that Alone paints is destroyed, and he is convinced that death means salvation by the god Hypnos and his follower Pandora. Alone then gathers Hades' soldiers, the 108 Specters to start a war against Athena.

As the Saints and the Specters face off, Piscis Albafica protects the Sanctuary and a near town from Alone's forces but dies in combat. Virgo Asmita sacrifices his life to create a rosary that seals the Specters' souls and prevent Alone from reviving them. Alone starts making the "Lost Canvas", a vast painting of the earth, in the sky, so that after he finishes it, the entire world will die. The two Gods are sealed by the former Saints Pope Sage, and his twin brother Altar Hakurei, Alone invites the few remaining Saints to the Demonic Temples located in the Lost Canvas. Tenma reaches Alone with Dohko's help but they are defeated and Dohko stays behind to make time so that Aries Shion teleports Tenma. Sasha sends Scorpio Kardia and Aquarius Dégel on a mission to find an item to find the energy to make a flying ship to reach Alone. Though both die in battle, Degel's friend Sea Dragon Unity bring the coral to Sasha. The Bronze Saints led by Sagittarius Sisyphos and Leo Regulus make the ship but the former dies fighting the Specters opposing them. The Saints continue their mission while Gemini Defteros gives a surviving Dohko Athena's Cloth to give him to the Goddess while he dies fighting his revived brother Gemini Aspros. A guilty ridden Aspros tries to kill Alone but he is defeated by Tenma's father, Mephistopheles Yōma. Yoma reveals his desire to turn Tenma into his weapon while his wife Owl Partita appears as a Specters in the Temples to force her son to transform his protective Pegasus Bronze Cloth into the most powerful armour, God Cloth. With the God Cloth, Tenma and his future reincarnations will be able to fight the Gods and aid Athena in ending all wars. While Tenma kills Partita, Aspros sacrifices himself to defeat Mephistopheles Yōma and seals Yōma's soul in Asmita's rosary. Although Hades' side remains superiors, Alone reveals he always was controlled Hades and kills most of his forces to destroy world on his own rules.

Following several battles in the Temples, Tenma faces Alone one-on-one with the former managing to defeat the latter, causing the Lost Canvas' destruction. Shortly afterwards, Alone is possessed by Hades. Hades is forced by the souls from the deceased Saints to escape to the last Demonic Temple, and Tenma, Sasha, and Alone decide to follow him. The three manage to defeat Hades but they never return to Earth after their apparent deaths. The two surviving Saints, Aries Shion, then prepare for a possible future war against Hades. Weakened by his battle with Bennu Kagaho, Libra Dohko has his body sealed by the power of Sasha and is assigned to permanently watch over the seal of Hades and 108 specters in Asmita's rosary, while Aries Shion reconstructs and leads the Athena's Sanctuary. In the epilogue, an elder Dohko hears from Shion's student, Aries Mu, that his master appears to have been killed but Dohko is optimistic that Tenma's reincarnation, Pegasus Seiya, will save Athena's reincarnation.

=== The Lost Canvas Gaiden ===
While most stories of Lost Canvas Gaiden are prequels focused on each Gold Saint, Aries Shion' story takes place fourteen years after Hades' defeat with Tenma's father Kairos returning to the Sanctuary. Kairos realizes that his son Tenma is alive and wants to keep using him against the Gods from the Olympus. Kairos attacks the Sanctuary and exiles it from other lands with Shion and Dohko also realizing Tenma survived. With the Saints defeated by Kairos, Shion leaves his position as Pope and transports Kairos and himself to another land. Tenma and Sasha then appear and defeat Kairos. While both of them disappear afterwards, their Cloths return to the Sanctuary which returns to peace after Kairos' death.

== Development ==
Shiori Teshirogi always wanted to draw manga, ever since her childhood where she mainly followed Rumiko Takahashi's works. What sparked her desire to become a professional was when his little brother bought Saint Seiya manga when she was in elementary school. Teshirogi liked the manga as well as the comments at the end of the volume by Masami Kurumada, as he she could really feel the passion the author put into his world. She was impressed by the work and wanted to become a character designer. She particularly enjoyed the Sanctuary arc for Gemini Saga and Acquarius Camus' battles against Pegasus Seiya and Cygnus Hyoga but ended favoriting Libra Dohko. The Saint Seiya manga made her want to read works on Greek mythology. A few years later, when the publisher Square Enix organized a competition called the game fantasy manga grand prize, she participated and was selected. Teshirogi then participated in a second Square Enix competition which was called the 21st Century Manga Grand Prize. Here again she was selected and awarded. From there, Teshirogi had a publisher who supported me and allowed me to make her debut in the manga industry. Teshirogi's fame within Square Enix nearly made her write a Final Fantasy VII manga until meeting Kurumada.

Teshirogi met Kurumada in a public event she once visited during the time she was a new manga author. In such event, Teshirogi sent Kurumada the first manga she made as well as a letter which made Kurumada ask her to write The Lost Canvas. Although she was happy with such proposal due to the fact Saint Seiya has always been her favourite manga, she found troubles writing it since she used to write shōjo and Lost Canvas was meant to be from the genre shōnen. In order to do that, Teshirogi had to change various things from her style such as the narration and getting used to how to draw fights. Before the manga started, Kurumada sent Teshirogi a general version of the manga's story, but as long as the series continued, she started changing some parts after discussing with people from Akita Shoten. Additionally, the characters designs and Cloths were based on the second season from the Saint Seiya anime adaptation (known as Asgard), but she combined them with her own style. When Teshirogi was purposed to start The Lost Canvas she was informed that the series would last a few volumes. However, when the tenth volume was published, she was surprised by the series' length which she found amazing. Every time Teshirogi met Kurumada see each other, they talked for a long time, and exchange ideas, and sent each other emails. The author found challenging properly displaying the characters' armors and fists while remaining true to her own style. In retrospect, Teshirogi believes Lost Canvas changed the way she herself did illustrations and thus thanked Kurumada for giving the opportunity to give her this work. Alone's design originated from Kurumada's ideas but still gave her freedom. Lost Canvas started as a story about Tenma and Alone's relationship but advices from her editor resulted in further writing the Holy War, especially the popular Gold Saints which shocked the audience. Tenma's father concept of a man who is responsible for most of the Holy War conflicts was created as a major plot twist Teshirogi used to further surprise the readers. For this she researched Greek mythology, resulting in the inclusion of Chronos' brother, Kairos. Scorpio Kardia was noted to be highly popular by Teshirogi due to the dynamic she gave to his personality as well as the contrast she gives Sasha. The latter was written to contrast Kurumada's take on Athena's reincarnation, Saori Kido, as both have different personalities as a result of being born and raised in different places. Meanwhile, Pandora was written to be more feminine than Kurumada's take.

Although Kurumada gave Teshirogi freedom with what to write, Teshirogi had problems across the entire serialization with one of her first three editors; She cited demands of more pages per chapters and ideas to make battles more interesting she found difficult like a Buddha statue fighting Athena's when the narrative involved the Gold Saint Virgo Asmita or how the Bat Specter could defeat Taurus Aldebaran. In regards to the characters' names, Teshirogi never tried to canonize elements from the original Saint Seiya like all Taurus Saints sharing the same name as Rasgado uses the alias Aldebaran like Kurumada's Taurus Saint. The other editors gave Teshirogi more freedom with her writing since not much was known about Saint Seiya by them. The only reason such name was written was because the author wanted to make an emotional scene with his student Teneo. Ever since the series began, Teshirogi always had two assistants. Among Hades' Specters, Wyvern Rhadamathys stood out as one of the strongest in the manga. As the manga artist liked his character, she found it sad killing him. Méphistophélès Yoma remained as one of the hardest characters to write. It was also awful to kill the characters since the fans loved them. Furthermore, this affected Teshirogi's health, leading to times of depression was horrible because I went through phases of ups and downs: when I killed one of the characters, she was plunged into depths of depression. This improved when Teshirogi started taking a liking to a new important character but once again had to kill him.

In the making of the series, emotions are what Teshirogi pays attention the most when she is drawing which makes remake several of the illustrations she makes. In both Saint Seiya and Lost Canvas, her favorite character is the Pegasus Saint, who has become the one she likes drawing the most. When creating Tenma, Lost Canvas's Pegasus Saint, Teshirogi checked if Tenma's words would be like the ones from Seiya, but she realized that both characters had different personalities. The Cancer, Pisces and Taurus Gold Saints were developed with Teshirogi's idea of what she could do with the ones from the original series. When she received comments that these three Lost Canvas Gold Saints are more interesting than the ones from the original series, she answered that she did not mean to give them any special treatment. The characters' names are created according to their origins and constellation such as Pisces Albafica whose "Alba" portion of his name was developed when Teshirogi was thinking of roses' names. After the manga ended, Teshirogi started writing the prequel manga Saint Seiya The Lost Canvas: Gaiden. As she reached the end, she also sought to start her own series and while she dealt with Gaiden at the same time. When the Gaiden moved to a monthly serialization, Teshirogi believed that her way of writing stories improved due to the time she was given with each chapter but had problems with portraying bishonen archetypes like Albafica's design. The Gaiden primarily involved character relationships and she avoided repetition. Once the series ended, Teshirogi felt a sense of emptiness and expressed a desire to explore Yuzuriha and Yato's characters more as well as that Tenma did not have too many appearances despite being the hero.

== Media ==
=== Manga ===
The Saint Seiya: The Lost Canvas chapters were published by Akita Shoten in the Weekly Shōnen Champion magazine since August 24, 2006. The first volume was published on December 12, 2006, and twenty-five tankōbon collecting the work were released.

A short story comprised in 40 pages, or gaiden, titled Saint Seiya: The Lost Canvas - Meiō Shinwa– Yuzuriha Gaiden - Chizumi no Mon (聖闘士星矢(セイントセイヤ) The Lost Canvas 冥王神話 ユズリハ外伝 血墨の紋) was published on October 16, 2009, in the issues 11 and 12 of Akita Shōten's Princess Gold comics magazine, which is oriented towards a female majority demographic. The story is set in the same continuity of Lost Canvas and further explores the past and motivations of the character Yuzuriha, and her younger brother Tokusa, as well as her perspective of the events surrounding the resurrection of Hades. This episode has yet to be included in a tankōbon compilation.

In the final chapter of The Lost Canvas, a new series of short stories focusing on the Gold Saints was announced. Simply titled Saint Seiya: The Lost Canvas - Anecdotes (聖闘士星矢(セイントセイヤ) The Lost Canvas 冥王神話 外伝) , the first chapter was published on May 19, 2011.

=== OVAs ===
An original video animations (OVAs) series premiered in Japan on June 24, 2009. The production is by TMS Entertainment while Osamu Nabeshima is the director and Yoshiyuki Suga the writer. The reason of The Lost Canvas being an OVA over a TV series remained as secret due to a decision from the producers. Character designer Yuko Iwasa said Teshirogi's drawing was too detailed. Initially, he experienced some difficulties with the numerous details on the armors everybody wears, knowing that when coloring, they often lose some of these details. He thought about drawing the armor based on their coloring and shadows. He did quite a few attempts, which ended in a lot of failures, but he ended up getting the desired result. Nabeshima faithfully followed the manga for the adaptation. Nabeshima showed a desire of making a sequel if the project was approved. Iwasa said Libra Dohko challenging Alone in the final episode was his favorite scene from the series.

The first season comprises thirteen OVAs, each 30 minutes in length. All the OVA episodes were released on DVD and Blu-ray format by VAP. Season 1 ended on April 21, 2010, with the release of the eleventh, twelfth and thirteenth episodes. The second season premiered on February 23, 2011, adding thirteen more OVAs to the series. Season 2 ended on July 20, 2011, with the release of OVAs 24, 25, and 26. In January 2011, Crunchyroll announced they would stream the series on the United States, Canada, the United Kingdom, and Ireland. The original design was unveiled at the Tokyo International Anime Fair 2009. Discotek Media licensed the OVA series for a DVD release in North America and set a preliminary release date for November 24, 2015 but the release was delayed to December 8, 2015. In August 2018, it was revealed that VSI Los Angeles had been commissioned by Netflix to make an English dub for the series.

Currently, TMS confirmed it has no plans for resuming production of the OVA series, leaving a large portion of the original manga not adapted to animation. Either way, in the interview with Nelson Akira Sato, president of the audiovisual distributor Sato Company, official distributor of The Lost Canvas in Brazil, confirmed that the original author, Masami Kurumada did not renew the rights with TMS Entertainment to continue with the animated adaptation of the manga. When the OVAs started production, Teshirogi was sad that one scene where Dohko talks with Tenma and Alone from the original printed version was removed in the anime. However, she was still glad the anime added new scenes and the fact that she was asked to write them herself. In contrast to Toei Animation's Saint Seiya, Teshirogi felt that Seiya and the rest of the main cast were too thin in contrast to her characters which she gave bigger bodies. One of the main animators contacted Teshirogi about his ideas to design the character as more obese than Toei's take and end with a more realistic style. Teshirogi also lamented that TMS did not produce a third season to the series.

| Season | Episodes | DVD and Blu-ray release dates | | | | | | |
| Season | Episodes | Volume 1 | Volume 2 | Volume 3 | Volume 4 | Volume 5 | Volume 6 | Complete OVA series |
|---|---|---|---|---|---|---|---|---|
| 1 | 13 | June 24, 2009 | August 21, 2009 | October 21, 2009 | December 23, 2009 | February 23, 2010 | April 21, 2010 | December 8, 2015 (North American) |
| 2 | 13 | February 23, 2011 | March 18, 2011 | April 20, 2011 | May 18, 2011 | June 22, 2011 | July 20, 2011 | December 8, 2015 (North American) |

== Merchandise ==
The Lost Canvas has spawned a few merchandise items. Three CDs have been released, one with the opening and ending theme songs called "Realm of Athena" and "Hana no Kusari" respectively. The other CD contains the original soundtrack for the first season of the anime adaptation, released on September 25, 2009. Two characters from the series, Pegasus Tenma and Bennu Kagaho, have been released as part of Bandai's Saint Seiya - Myth Cloth figure series. Other merchandise include a microfiber towel, a pocket mirror and two puzzles.

=== Opening & Ending Themes ===
聖闘士星矢 THE LOST CANVAS 冥王神話 主題歌集
| No. | Title | Length |
|---|---|---|
| 1. | "The Realm of Athena (TV Size)" | 1:35 |
| 2. | "The Realm of Athena (Full Version)" | 4:48 |
| 3. | "The Realm of Athena (Karaoke)" | 4:47 |
| 4. | "Chain of Flowers (TV Size) (花の鎖, Hana no Kusari)" | 1:39 |
| 5. | "Chain of Flowers (Full Version) (花の鎖, Hana no Kusari)" | 4:12 |
| 6. | "Chain of Flowers (Karaoke) (花の鎖, Hana no Kusari)" | 4:07 |

=== Original Soundtrack I ===
聖闘士星矢 THE LOST CANVAS 冥王神話 オリジナルサウンドトラック
| No. | Title | Length |
|---|---|---|
| 1. | "The Lost Canvas (失われたキャンバス, Ushinawareta Kyanbasu)" | 2:42 |
| 2. | "The Realm of Athena (TV Size) (アテナの王国, Atena no Ōkoku)" | 1:33 |
| 3. | "Tenma & Alone in Their Youth (幼き日のテンマとアローン, Itoki hi no Tenma to Alone)" | 2:15 |
| 4. | "Sasha's Prayer (サーシャの祈り, Sasha no Inori)" | 2:04 |
| 5. | "The Cathedral of the Forest (森の大聖堂, Mori no Daiseidou)" | 1:11 |
| 6. | "Hades The Underworld King (冥王ハーデス, Meiou Hades)" | 2:32 |
| 7. | "Awaken (覚醒, Kakusei)" | 1:09 |
| 8. | "Pandora (パンドラ, Pandora)" | 1:20 |
| 9. | "Spectre (冥闘士, Spectre)" | 1:25 |
| 10. | "Libra Dohko (天秤座の童虎, Tenbinza no Douko)" | 1:28 |
| 11. | "Bennu Kagaho of the Celestial Star of Violence (天暴星ベヌウの輝火, Tenbousei Benuu no Kagaho)" | 1:19 |
| 12. | "Virgo Asmita (乙女座のアスミタ, Otomoza no Asmita)" | 1:15 |
| 13. | "Taurus Aldebaran (牡牛座のアルデバラン, Oushiza no Aldebaran)" | 1:59 |
| 14. | "Goddess Athena (女神アテナ, Megami Athena)" | 1:26 |
| 15. | "Sanctuary (聖域, Sanctuary)" | 1:17 |
| 16. | "Cosmo (小宇宙, Cosmo)" | 1:10 |
| 17. | "Two Bronze Saints (二人の青銅聖闘士, Futari no Seidō Seinto)" | 0:58 |
| 18. | "Saint's Training (聖闘士の修業, Saint no Shuugyou)" | 0:58 |
| 19. | "Bonds (絆, Kizuna)" | 1:11 |
| 20. | "Relief (休息, Kyuusoku)" | 1:19 |
| 21. | "A Far Memory (遠い記憶, Tooi Kioku)" | 1:14 |
| 22. | "A Wreath of Promise (約束の花輪, Yakusoku no Hanawa)" | 1:40 |
| 23. | "Jamir (ジャミール, Jamil)" | 1:36 |
| 24. | "Underworld's Trap (冥界の罠, Meikai no Wana)" | 1:53 |
| 25. | "The Gray Canvas (灰色のキャンバス, Haiiro no Kyanbasu)" | 1:32 |
| 26. | "The Trio of the Netherworld (冥府の三重奏, Meifu no Sanjyuusō)" | 1:10 |
| 27. | "Emissary from Darkness (暗黒からの使者, Ankoku Kara no Shisha)" | 1:37 |
| 28. | "A Desperate Struggle (死闘, Shitō)" | 2:02 |
| 29. | "Death Messenger (デスメッセンジャー, Desumessenjā)" | 0:42 |
| 30. | "Saint's Death (聖闘士の死, Seinto no Shi)" | 3:18 |
| 31. | "Pope and Hades (教皇とハーデス, Kyoukou to Hades)" | 1:39 |
| 32. | "Clash (激突, Gekitotsu)" | 1:46 |
| 33. | "Cloth's Pride (聖衣の誇り, Seii no Hokori)" | 1:37 |
| 34. | "Holy War (聖戦, Seisen)" | 1:16 |
| 35. | "Pegasus Saint (天馬星座の聖闘士, Pegasus no Seinto)" | 1:47 |
| 36. | "Chain of Flowers (TV Size) (花の鎖, Hana no Kusari)" | 1:33 |

=== Character Song ===
聖闘士星矢 THE LOST CANVAS 冥王神話 キャラクターソング アルバム
| No. | Title | Length |
|---|---|---|
| 1. | "FAITH (耶人 (阿部敦) CV: Atsushi Abe / Unicorn Yato" | 4:22 |
| 2. | "Promise ～君を守るよ～ (ユズリハ (小林沙苗)) CV: Sanae Kobayashi / Crane Yuzuriha" | 4:30 |
| 3. | "Golden Dream (童虎 (三宅健太)) CV: Kenta Miyake / Libra Dohko" | 4:27 |
| 4. | "Deadend Game (タナトス (川田紳司) CV: Shinji Kawada / Thanatos" | 4:11 |
| 5. | "Nothing (アローン(下野紘)) CV: Hiro Shimono / Alone" | 3:27 |
| 6. | "Illusion Garden (パンドラ (水樹奈々) CV: Nana Mizuki / Pandora" | 4:42 |
| 7. | "Legend of Us (ラギ・エル・ナギル (柿原徹也) CV: Tetsuya Kakihara / Pegasus Tenma" | 4:11 |
| 8. | "Strength (アルデバラン (杉田智和)) CV: Tomokazu Sugita / Taurus Hasgard" | 4:19 |
| 9. | "Azure (サーシャ(平野綾)) CV: Aya Hirano / Sasha" | 5:18 |

=== CD Drama Albafica Gaiden ===
A CD Drama about one of Athena's Saints, Pisces Albafica has been released. The CD is currently only available to people that have purchased the first pressings of all 6 DVD or Blu-ray volumes of the Saint Seiya: The Lost Canvas animation. Only people in Japan are eligible to be sent the CD.

=== Artbook ===
An artbook named Saint Seiya: The Lost Canvas – The Myth of Hades Illustrations (聖闘士星矢(セイントセイヤ) The Lost Canvas 冥王神話画集, Seinto Seiya Za Rosuto Kyanbasu - Meiō Shinwa Gashū) was released on March 18, 2016, to coincide with the release of the final chapter of "The Lost Canvas: Anecdotes" serialization and the 10th anniversary of The Lost Canvas series.

== Reception ==
The volumes from both the main series, and the spin-offs sold well in Japan. According to a booklet that came along with the fifth Anecdotes volume, the twenty-five volumes of The Lost Canvas has sold about 6.7 million copies only in Japan (by 2013).

GamerFocus called Lost Canvas a remake rather than a prequel due to how Teshirogi used characters from the original Saint Seiya series and gave them their own unique traits. In retrospect, the writer claimed Saint Seiya did not stand out too much in terms of narrative as it recycled the tropes of characters going to different missions to rescue Saori as a damsel in distress and few characters have notable depth with the exception of Gemini Saga. While still finding Teshirogi's take simple, the way she wrote the main cast helps to make it entertaining, sometimes even more than Masami Kurumada's Saint Seiya. This was especially thanks to the appeal the Gold Saints give to the plot as the writer highlighted Kurumada's Gold Saint were also the most popular characters in the original series. Manga News first addressed that the artstyle Teshirogi provided to her manga heavily contrasted the controversial drawings of Kurumada from the original Saint Seiya and Megumu Okada's work in Saint Seiya: Episode.G. While noting the narrative is not too different from the original Saint Seiya, Manga News addressed that the focus involving the twelve strongest Gold Saints over Kurumada's five Bronze Saints made the both works different. However, due to the fact the Hades arc from Saint Seiya highlighted that the only two survivors of the Holy War are Shion and Dohko gave Lost Canvas a far darker premise as most of the character are expected die in the Holy War. The protagonist Pegasus Tenma was noted to be too similar to Seiya but more likable while the Gold Saints instead are nearly identical to the original which might bring mixed emotions to the readers. Zona Negativa praised Teshirogi's artwork especially for the character designs she provides to the cast to the point of surpassing the original manga, making it highly appealing to people who wanted to see more of the Gold Saints, especially Dohko and Shion. La Republica also compared The Lost Canvas with Saint Seiya: Next Dimension as both are prequels to the original Saint Seiya but with different writers; The writer felt The Lost Canvas was the superior prequel for its handling of the Gold Saints as more prominent characters and the protagonist not overshadowing the rest members from the series and most fights seemed better elaborated. In regards to the climax and ending, ActuaBD enjoyed the themes employed during the fights between Gemini Aspros and Kairos who share several parallels while giving closure not only to Tenma's story in his fights against Alone and Hades but also the warriors who survive to the Holy War.

The anime series has received generally positive reviews by anime critics. It has been praised for it being accessible to viewers who have no knowledge of the original Saint Seiya despite being a prequel, and at the same time it allows fans from the original to view events from a different point of view. While the use of characters was noted to be common within Japanese series in general, the delivery from various of them such as Tenma's and Alone's relationship was noted to be enjoyable. The animation was noted for standing out "beautifully" mostly in fights. Although the attacks performed by the character was found unintentionally funny by UK Anime Network as a result of its names, the notable display of violence made the reviewer wonder whether the show should be aimed towards a young audience.
