= Ring ni Kakero =

Japanese manga and anime series

- Cover of the first manga volume

リングにかけろ (Ringu ni Kakero)
- Genre: Sports
- Manga
- Written by: Masami Kurumada
- Published by: Shueisha
- Imprint: Jump Comics
- Magazine: Weekly Shōnen Jump
- Original run: January 10, 1977 – October 12, 1981
- Volumes: 25
- Manga

Ring ni Kakero 2
- Written by: Masami Kurumada
- Published by: Shueisha
- Magazine: Super Jump
- Original run: 2000 – 2008
- Volumes: 26
- Anime television series

Ring ni Kakero 1
- Directed by: Toshiaki Komura (season 1); Yukio Kaizawa (season 2); Hiroshi Ikehata (season 3–4)
- Produced by: Hedwig Schleck (season 1); Atsushi Kido (season 2); Shōsuke Okada (season 3); Yoshihide Moriyama (season 4)
- Written by: Yōsuke Kuroda
- Music by: Susumu Ueda
- Studio: Toei Animation
- Original network: TV Asahi (seasons 1–2); Animax (seasons 3–4)
- Original run: October 6, 2004 – June 12, 2011
- Episodes: 36

Ring ni Kakero (Japanese: リングにかけろ, Hepburn: Ringu ni Kakero; lit. 'Put It All in the Ring') is a Japanese manga series written and illustrated by Masami Kurumada. It was published in Weekly Shōnen Jump between January 1977 and October 1981. The individual chapters were compiled by Shueisha into twenty-five tankōbon volumes. A sequel, entitled Ring ni Kakero 2, was serialized in Super Jump between 2000 and 2008.

An anime adaptation produced by Toei Animation premiered in October 2004. It was followed by a second season that premiered in April 2006, a third season in April 2010 and a fourth season in April 2011.

== Plot ==
The story centers around the life of a young boxer named Ryuuji Takane and his sister Kiku, who is his coach. Ryuuji and his sister both inherited their father's talent for boxing with Ryuuji inheriting his strength and techniques while Kiku picked up his talent for analysis and strategy. In the past, their father was a famous boxer. Ryuuji and Kiku went away from home to train and become famous in order to help their lonely mother. On the way to stardom, they have to defeat the strongest challengers all over the world.

In Ring ni Kakero 1, the characters are briefly introduced, telling the story from the moment Ryuuji and Jun Kenzaki (his eternal challenger and supposedly best friend) fight for the National Boxing Title and having both achieved stardom. Ryuuji's sister then tells the story from the beginning which starts from when Ryuuji is the finalist in a local youth championship and had to compete against Kenzaki, the latter winning after an almost tie and K.O. one-to-one fight.

Afterward, most of the series tells about Ryuuji being the successor of Kenzaki (as the latter was terribly injured and almost crippled), who competes in the Japan National Boxing Championship, where he encounters strong and deadly opponents, including Ishimatsu Katori (a comic relief, but also a strong fighter), Takeshi Kawai (who specializes in the upper jab technique; he is also a pianist and also likes to cheat) and Kazuki Shinatora (who specializes in the Rolling Thunder technique; he is a former kendo practitioner, who retired when he challenged his father due to his cruel training).

Later on, the Jr. Japan team facing Blackshaft's team was adapted into an anime. Ryuji, Jun, Katori, Kazuki, and Takeshi represented Japan. Blackshaft had no intention of taking Japan seriously in a boxing match so he recruits Mick, leader of the Great Angels New York Branch (originally the Hells Angels in the manga), a deathrow inmate Monster Jail, Missie Chanel, a mysterious androgynous boy boxing champion known for his unhealthy obsession with his own beauty that knows no bounds (even in the ring) as well as that in which he savors reducing the "pretty" faces of any opponent he faces in the ring into mush, along with hypnotic powers that he casts upon his opponents to leave them as sitting ducks for his attacks and high-speed punches and fancy footwork, and N.B. Forrest, also known as the emperor of the south and a Ku Klux Klan member (in the manga). The second season ends with The Shadow clan, formed by a boxer who used the sweet science as an assassination art, aiming after Team Japan.

== Characters ==
Ryuuji Takane (高嶺 竜児, Takane Ryūji)
Voiced by: Masakazu Morita
The main character of the series, Ryuuji is a fierce and spirited young man who is trained in boxing techniques by his older sister Kiku. He has strong skill in basic techniques like jabs and one-twos. His special attacks include the Boomerang Hook and Boomerang Telios.
Kiku Takane (高嶺 菊, Takane Kiku)
Voiced by: Rie Tanaka
Jun Kenzaki (剣崎 順, Kenzaki Jun)
Voiced by: Ryōtarō Okiayu
Ishimatsu Katori (香取 石松, Katori Ishimatsu)
Voiced by: Takeshi Kusao
Kazuki Shinatora (志那虎 一城, Shinatora Kazuki)
Voiced by: Hideo Ishikawa
Takeshi Kawai (河井 武士, Kawai Takeshi)
Voiced by: Hiroshi Kamiya
Futaba Shinatora (志那虎 二葉, Shinatora Futaba)
Voiced by: Fumiko Inoue
Takako Kawai (河井 貴子, Kawai Takako)
Voiced by: Mami Kingetsu
Catherine (キャサリン, Kyasarin)
Voiced by: Mai Aizawa
Blackshaft (ブラックシャフト, Burakkushafuto; nicknamed simply as Shaft)
Voiced by: Takehito Koyasu
Führer Skörpion (フューラー・スコルピオン, Fyūrā Sukorupion)
Voiced by: Hikaru Midorikawa
Krüger Helga (クリューガー・ヘルガ, Kuryūgā Heruga)
Voiced by: Hiro Yuki
Napoléon Valois (ナポレオーン・バロア, Naporeōn Baroa)
Voiced by: Toshiyuki Morikawa
Don Juliano (ドン・ジュリアーノ, Don Juriāno)
Voiced by: Takaya Kuroda
Jun Shadow (影道 殉(シャドー・ジュン), Shadō Jun)
Voiced by: Takahiro Sakurai

== Media ==
=== Manga ===
Ring ni Kakero is written and illustrated by Masami Kurumada. The series was published in Shueisha's Weekly Shōnen Jump between January 10, 1977, and October 12, 1981. Shueisha compiled the individual chapters into twenty-five tankōbon volumes published between January 31, 1978, and January 15, 1983. The series was re-released into a 18-volume deluxe edition published between September 9, 2001, and May 6, 2002.

In 2000, a sequel entitled Ring ni Kakero 2 was published in Shueisha's Super Jump, a seinen magazine. Ring ni Kakero 2 tells the story of Kiku and Jun's son, Rindo Kenzaki, who is raised by Katori Ishimatsu after losing both of his parents. The series ran on an irregular basis until 2008. Shueisha compiled the individual chapters into twenty-six tankōbon volumes published between July 9, 2000, and February 9, 2009.

=== Video game ===
A video game titled Ring ni Kakero was released for the Super Famicom. It was available to download to writable Nintendo Power cartridges on June 1, 1998.

=== Anime ===
27 years after the first chapter debuted, the manga was finally adapted into an anime series by Toei Animation. The series premiered October 6, 2004, and was broadcast on TV Asahi. It covered the first story arc of the manga. Since Ring ni Kakero 2 was being serialized in Super Jump at the time, the anime was titled Ring ni Kakero 1 to distinguish it from the more current manga (the original manga was later republished under the anime title). A total of 36 episodes divided into four seasons were made, published in format DVD for the world market. A fifth season was planned but was canceled due to the death of the series character designer and animation director Shingo Araki in 2011.

==== Episode list ====
===== Season 1: Carnival Champion arc (2004) =====
| No. overall | No. in season | Title | Original air date |
|---|---|---|---|
| 1 | 1 | "Youth that Shines" "Kagayakeru seishun" (輝ける青春) | October 6, 2004 (double episode premiere) |
| 2 | 2 | "Goodbye, Golden Fist" "Saraba, ougon no ude" (さらば黄金の腕) | October 6, 2004 (double episode premiere) |
| 3 | 3 | "Its Name is Boomerang" "Sono na wa Buumeran" (その名はブーメラン) | October 13, 2004 |
| 4 | 4 | "Champion Carnival Begins" "Chanpion Kaanibaru kaimaku" (チャンピオンカーニバル開幕) | October 20, 2004 |
| 5 | 5 | "Roar! Boomerang Hook" "Unare! Buumeran Fukku" (唸れ！ブーメランフック) | October 27, 2004 |
| 6 | 6 | "Rolling Thunder" "Rooringu Sandaa" (ローリングサンダー) | November 3, 2004 |
| 7 | 7 | "Tomorrow" "Ashita" (あした) | November 10, 2004 |
| 8 | 8 | "The Man's Determination" "Otoko no iji" (男の意地) | November 17, 2004 |
| 9 | 9 | "The Thunder & The Boomerang" "Inazuma to Buumeran" (稲妻とブーメラン) | November 24, 2004 |
| 10 | 10 | "Gong of Fate" "Unmei no Gongu" (運命のゴング) | December 1, 2004 |
| 11 | 11 | "Navigation to Victory" "Shouri e no koukai" (勝利への航海) | December 8, 2004 |
| 12 | 12 | "Formation! Golden Japan Jr." "Kessei ! Ougon no Nihon Jr." (結成！黄金の日本Jr.) | December 15, 2004 |

===== Season 2: The Pacific War arc (2006) =====
| No. overall | No. in season | Title | Original air date |
|---|---|---|---|
| 1 | 13 | "Start! Golden Japan Jr." "Shidou! Ougon no Nihon Jr." (始動！黄金の日本Jr.) | April 6, 2006 |
| 2 | 14 | "Under the Flag of the Oath" "Chikai no Hata no Motode" (誓いの旗のもとで) | April 13, 2006 |
| 3 | 15 | "Taking the Field! Fighting Champion" "Shutsujin! Kenka Champion" (出陣! ケンカチャンピオン) | April 20, 2006 |
| 4 | 16 | "Logding One's Soul into the Fist" "Tamashi wo Kobushi ni Yadoshite" (魂を拳に宿して) | April 27, 2006 |
| 5 | 17 | "Pierce Through the Storm!" "Arashi wo Tsukiyabure!" (嵐を突き破れ!) | May 4, 2006 |
| 6 | 18 | "Temptation! The Demon's Eyes" "Yuuwaku! Mamono no me" (誘惑! 魔性の目) | May 11, 2006 |
| 7 | 19 | "Run Up the Musical Scale!" "Onkai wo Kakenobare!" (音階を駆けのぼれ!) | May 18, 2006 |
| 8 | 20 | "Natural Born Madness" "Nachuraru Boun Madonesu" (ナチュラルボーンマッドネス) | May 25, 2006 |
| 9 | 21 | "Fierce Tiger, Go Wild" "Mouko, Araburu" (猛虎、荒ぶる) | June 1, 2006 |
| 10 | 22 | "Superstar" "Suupaastaa" (スーパースター) | June 8, 2006 |
| 11 | 23 | "Black Flash" "Kuroi Senkou" (黒い閃光) | June 15, 2006 |
| 12 | 24 | "...And So the Boy Flies to the World" "Soshite Shounen wa Sekai e to Habataku" (そして少年は世界へと羽ばたく) | June 22, 2006 |

===== Season 3: Shadow arc (2010) =====
| No. overall | No. in season | Title | Original air date |
|---|---|---|---|
| 1 | 25 | "The Shadow Clan" "Shadou Ichizoku" (影道一族) | April 2, 2010 |
| 2 | 26 | "The Tower of Shadow" "Kage no Tou" (影道の塔) | April 2, 2010 |
| 3 | 27 | "Gathered Again! Golden Japan Jr." "Saishuuketsu! Ougon no Nippon Jr." (再集結!黄金の日本ジュニア) | May 7, 2010 |
| 4 | 28 | "Bloody Fight! Thousand Miles' Slope" "Kessen! Senri Kyuuryou" (血戦!千里丘陵) | May 7, 2010 |
| 5 | 29 | "The Leader Appears" "Sousui Toujou" (総帥登場) | June 4, 2010 |
| 6 | 30 | "Farewell Shadow" "Saraba Shadou" (さらば影道) | June 4, 2010 |

===== Season 4: World Tournament arc (2011) =====
| No. overall | No. in season | Title | Original release date |
|---|---|---|---|
| 1 | 31 | "Its Name is Square" "Sono na wa Square"" (その名はスクエアー!) | April 10, 2011 |
| 2 | 32 | "The Grand France" "Kareinaru Furansu" (華麗なるフランス) | April 10, 2011 |
| 3 | 33 | "Vollkommenheit" "Forukomenhaito" (フォルコメンハイト) | May 15, 2011 |
| 4 | 34 | "Hero vs. Genius" "Eiyū vs. Tensai" (英雄VS天才) | May 15, 2011 |
| 5 | 35 | "The Flag of Oath" "Chikai no Hata" (誓いの旗) | June 12, 2011 |
| 6 | 36 | "Farewell, Golden Japan Jr." "Saraba Ōgon no Nippon Jr." (さらば黄金の日本Jr.) | June 12, 2011 |

== Reception ==
Ring ni Kakero has sold over 13 million copies.
