= B't X =

Japanese manga series

- First tankōbon volume cover
- Genre: Adventure; Science fiction
- Manga
- Written by: Masami Kurumada
- Published by: Kadokawa Shoten
- English publisher: NA: Tokyopop
- Magazine: Monthly Shōnen Ace
- Original run: December 1994 – February 2000
- Volumes: 16
- Light novel
- Written by: Sukehiro Tomita
- Illustrated by: Masami Kurumada
- Published by: Kadokawa Shoten
- Imprint: Newtype Novels
- Original run: 20 July 1996 – 28 February 1997
- Volumes: 2
- Anime television series
- Directed by: Mamoru Hamatsu
- Produced by: Tadahito Matsumoto; Kenji Mizunuma
- Written by: Mamoru Hamatsu
- Music by: Akira Senju
- Studio: TMS Entertainment
- Licensed by: NA: Anime Midstream
- Original network: JNN (TBS)
- English network: US: Anime Network
- Original run: 6 April 1996 – 21 September 1996
- Episodes: 25
- Anime television series

B't X Neo
- Directed by: Hajime Kamegaki
- Produced by: Kazuo Yokoyama; Yuji Morioka (7–14); Tetsuya Watanabe; Tadahito Matsumoto; Kenji Mizunuma
- Written by: Yoshiyuki Suga
- Music by: Fumitaka Anzai
- Studio: TMS Entertainment
- Licensed by: NA: Anime Midstream
- Original network: JNN (TBS)
- Original run: 21 August 1997 – 20 November 1997
- Episodes: 14

B't X (pronounced "beat x" and stylized as B'ᴛ X) is a Japanese manga series, written and illustrated by Masami Kurumada. It was serialized in Kadokawa Shoten's Monthly Shōnen Ace from 1994 to 2000. The series is set in a fictional universe where science has progressed to the creation of mechanical AI creatures known as B'ts. A 25-episode anime television series adaptation by TMS Entertainment aired between April and September 1996. It was followed by a 14-episode sequel titled B't X Neo, aired between August and November 1997.

== Synopsis ==
=== Setting ===
B't X is set on an alternate Earth, where a faction known as the Machine Empire rules a significant large piece of land known as "The Area" in the Gobi Desert. The Machine Empire invests highly in scientific advancements and schools children from an early age to become striving scientists. Mechanical engineering have culminated in the creation of cyborgs and most recently mechanical beasts, powered by human blood, the Bt. The series mostly takes place in the Machine Empire, but also on Kamui island, where the main characters were born. An island that was created from a crashed meteor and contains a piece of a sun, far underground.

A B't (pronounced "beat") is the ultimate form of mecha designed for fighting - the B stands for Brain, Blood, Bravery and Battler. They have different forms and powers, usually based on mythological creatures. The B't's source of power is a device called BreakHeart, which is fueled by human blood. Once the BreakHeart is inserted into the B't's body, it creates a link between the blood donor and the B't. A B't is also outfitted with the Guard System, which protects its donor from various dangers and environment changes, such as volcanic heat, the crushing pressures beneath the ocean, or even the depths of space. However, the donor must be in physical contact with his or her B't for the system to work for them. Teppei is able to manifest a suit of protective armor called Battle Gear through use of the Messiah Fist. This has the additional benefit of activating the usually dormant wings on X's sides, enabling him to reach even greater degrees of speed and mobility.

=== Plot ===
Teppei Takamiya is the caretaker of a farm located in Kamui Island, north of Japan. His older brother, Kotarō Takamiya, leaves to study robotics in Germany and becomes one of the most brilliant scientists in the world. Five years later, the two brothers reunite at a robotics convention in Mechatopia, China, where Kotarō is to announce his latest breakthrough in artificial intelligence. The convention goes awry when Kotarō is captured by the malevolent Machine Empire and taken to "The Area". Teppei manages to hitch a ride on his brother's capturer and reaches the Machine Empire, Teppei is attacked by Metalface, one of the Empire's soldiers. Unable to win, Teppei is thrown, bleeding, in the Empire's junkyard. His blood reaches the trashed body of X, who was once considered one of the strongest B't of the Empire, and the disgruntled B't awakens. Faced with unanswered questions and imminent destruction, X reluctantly saves Teppei, and the pair flee the Area with soldiers of the Empire in hot pursuit.

Meanwhile, inside the Area, Kotarō discovers that he has been summoned by another of the Empire's soldiers, Major Aramis, to find a way to stop the ultimate B't - a creation known as Raffaello (ラファエロ) that has begun a terrifying and uncontrollable evolution. Teppei's main goal is to save his brother, but as he and X venture further into the Area and learn more about the Machine Empire, they start to fight for the survival of the human race. On the way to the center of the Empire, they gain allies that help them prevail over the guardians of the empire. The ultimate B't eventually finalizes its evolution and the Machine Emperor appears. Before the emperor can fuse with Raffaello, Teppei and his allies confront him.

== Voice cast ==
Character
Character	Japanese	English
Teppei Takamiya	Nobuyuki Hiyama; Yoshiko Kamei (child)	Eric Vale; Kristen McGuire (child)
Kotaro Takamiya	Nozomu Sasaki	Jessie James Grelle
B't X	Jin Horikawa	Jeremy Inman
Karen	Megumi Ogata	Morgan Garrett
B't Shadow X	Emi Shinohara	Marissa Lenti
Aramis	Atsuko Yuya	Caitlin Glass
Metal Face	Kenyu Horiuchi	Tyson Rinehart
B't Madonna	Misa Watanabe	Rachel Robinson
Fou Lafine	Kazuya Ichijō	J. Michael Tatum
B't J'Taime	Asako Dodo	Tia Ballard
Hokuto	Osamu Sakuta	Chris Bevins
B't Max	Gara Takashima	Clarine Harp
Ron	Keiji Fujiwara	Ian Sinclair
B't Raido	Ryuji Mizuno	Marcus Stimac
Karin	Chisa Yokoyama	Joanna Grelle
Misha	Ai Orikasa	Alison Viktorin
Nasha	Kyōko Hikami	Natalie Hoover
Gaku	Fujiko Takimoto	Amber Lee Connors
Big Rock		Amber Lee Connors
Captain Hook	Matsuo Matsuo	Robert McCollum
B't Groupie	Chō	Chuck Huber
Camilla	Kappei Yamaguchi	Meli Grant
B't Mirage	Maya Okamoto	Melissa Sternenberg
Misslim	Jūrōta Kosugi	Curtis Arnott
La Lainya	Seiko Fujiki	Alex Moore
Cyber Whip		Alex Moore
Marcello	Naoki Tatsuta	Justin Briner
Amigo	Shinpachi Tsuji	Chris Rager
Juggler	Issei Futamata	Mike McFarland
Zaji	Yasunori Matsumoto	Nick Landis
Kaos	Osamu Kobayashi	Bruce Carey
L'Amour	Katsuhisa Hōki	Jason Marnocha
Balzac	Mitsuo Senda	Mark Stoddard
Mira	Takehito Koyasu	Gianni Matragrano
Leon	Kōji Ishii	Brandon Potter
Rai	Shō Hayami	R. Bruce Elliott
B't Savannah	Tetsuo Kanao	Zach Bolton
Maria	Noriko Hidaka	Alexis Tipton
God of Death	Mitsuru Miyamoto	Tyler Walker
Aleph		Tyler Walker
Bem	Hideyuki Umezu	Alejandro Saab
Cancer		Ricco Fajardo
Crow	Kōji Ishii	Daman Mills
B't Falcon	Kenichi Ono	Chris Guerrero
Lena	Hiroko Ikuta	Jad Saxton
Dr. Nitzin	Motomu Kiyokawa	Howard Wang
B't Bat		Scott Frerichs
Teppei's father		Kent Williams
Teppei's mother		Marissa Lenti

== Media ==
=== Manga ===
B't X by Masami Kurumada was serialized in Kadokawa Shoten's Monthly Shōnen Ace from the December 1994 to the February 2000 issues, with the 63 individual chapters published into 16 tankōbon volumes by Kadokawa Shoten.

The manga was released in North America by Tokyopop. When B't X was released in America by Tokyopop, all of the sound effects in the manga were printed in Japanese, just as in the original version and in most other Tokyopop Manga, with the addition of English captions.

==== Volumes ====
No.	Original release date	Original ISBN	English release date	English ISBN
01	March 1995	4-04-713102-4	6 January 2004	1-59182-639-X
02	July 1995	4-04-713109-1	2 March 2004	1-59182-640-3
03	November 1995	4-04-713121-0	4 May 2004	1-59182-641-1
04	March 1996	4-04-713131-8	13 July 2004	1-59182-642-X
05	June 1996	4-04-713143-1	14 September 2004	1-59182-643-8
06	October 1996	4-04-713166-0	9 November 2004	1-59182-644-6
07	April 1997	4-04-713177-6	11 January 2005	1-59532-377-5
08	August 1997	4-04-713193-8	8 March 2005	1-59532-378-3
09	November 1997	4-04-713201-2	7 June 2005	1-59532-379-1
10	March 1998	4-04-713211-X	10 January 2006	1-59532-380-5
11	June 1998	4-04-713225-X	3 July 2006	1-59532-381-3
12	October 1998	4-04-713238-1	9 January 2007	1-59532-382-1
13	February 1999	4-04-713269-1	3 July 2007	1-59532-383-X
14	June 1999	4-04-713284-5	2 January 2008	1-59532-384-8
15	October 1999	4-04-713302-7	7 July 2008	1-59532-385-6
16	February 2000	4-04-713326-4	30 November 2010	1-59532-386-4

The series was also republished by Home-sha, a Shueisha company, in an edition of more than 300-pages per volume.

- Home-sha (Home-sha manga bunko) (2002)

#	Japanese release date	Japanese ISBN
1	September 2002	4-8342-7240-0
2	September 2002	4-8342-7241-9
3	October 2002	4-8342-7242-7
4	October 2002	4-8342-7243-5
5	November 2002	4-8342-7244-3
6	November 2002	4-8342-7245-1
7	December 2002	4-8342-7246-X
8	December 2002	4-8342-7247-8

=== Anime ===
An anime adaptation containing 25 episodes aired in Japan between April and September 1996, this series adapts the first six tankōbon volumes of the manga. A second season, titled B't X Neo (ビート・エックス・ネオ, Bīto Ekkusu Neo), consisted of 14 episodes. Neo aired between 21 August and 20 November 1997; this season adapts some chapters of the manga but has a derivative storyline and an alternate ending.

Originally licensed by Texas-based anime licensing company Illumitoon Entertainment and published on DVD via Westlake Entertainment. Two dual-audio DVDs were released by Westlake, covering the first eight episodes, before being cancelled. The first 14 episodes, the only ones to be dubbed, were available on-demand via the Anime Network. The license was eventually transferred to Anime Midstream after Illumitoon went defunct. Anime Midstream announced on 14 August 2016 during their panel at the AnimeFest convention in Dallas, that they would redistribute the whole series with the Japanese language track, subtitles, and an English dub. They released the series on DVD with both English subtitles and a new English dub on 3 August 2018. On 12 April 2019, Anime Midstream announced that they would release the OVA series B't X Neo on DVD in dual audio on 26 April 2019.

==== Season 1: B't X (1996) ====
No.	Title	Directed by	Written by	Original release date
1	"Miracle! The Revival of B't X!" "kiseki! fukkatsu no B'T X (bīto ekkusu)" (Japanese: 奇蹟! 復活のB'T X(ビート・エックス))	Mamoru Hamatsu	Sukehiro Tomita	6 April 1996
2	"Rebirth! The Sun Battler" "tanjō! taiyō no senshi (batorā)" (Japanese: 誕生! 太陽の戦士(バトラー))	Hitoyuki Matsui	Sukehiro Tomita	13 April 1996
3	"Confrontation! The Machine Empire" "taiketsu! kikai kōkoku no yabō" (Japanese: 対決! 機械皇国の野望)	Kiyotaka Itani	Sukehiro Tomita	20 April 1996
4	"Appearance! The Legendary Spirit Knight" "tōjō ! densetsu no shirei shō" (Japanese: 登場! 伝説の四霊将)	Kiyoshi Fukumoto	Yasushi Hirano	27 April 1996
5	"Departure! Desperate Battle Road" "shuppatsu (tabidachi)! kesshi no kyūshutsusakusen (batoru rōdo)" (Japanese: 出発(たびだち)! 決死の救出作戦(バトルロード))	Yukio Takahashi	Yoshiyuki Suga	4 May 1996
6	"Fear! The Watch Man, Pirate in the Desert!" "kyōfu! sabaku no pairētsu" (Japanese: 恐怖! 砂漠のパイレーツ)	Atsushi Yano	Yasushi Hirano	11 May 1996
7	"Frightening! The Mystery of the Machine Emperor!" "kyōgaku! kikai kōtei no nazo" (Japanese: 驚愕! 機械皇帝の謎)	Yukio Okazaki	Yoshiyuki Suga	18 May 1996
8	"Magnificent! The Dazzling Solder, Camilla!" "karei! genwaku senshi kamīra" (Japanese: 華麗! 幻惑戦士カミーラ)	Kiyoshi Fukumoto	Yoshiyuki Suga	25 May 1996
9	"Fear! Evil Flower!" "kyōi! ebiru furawā" (Japanese: 驚異! エビル・フラワー)	Yoshihiro Oda	Yoshiyuki Suga	1 June 1996
10	"Chase! Metal Face Counterattacks!" "hakugeki! metarufeisu no gyakushū" (Japanese: 迫撃! メタルフェイスの逆襲)	Kiyoshi Fukumoto	Yasushi Hirano	8 June 1996
11	"Invincible! Spirit General of the East, Ron" "muteki! higashi no reishō ron" (Japanese: 無敵! 東の霊将ロン)	Kiyotaka Itani	Nobuaki Kishima	15 June 1996
12	"Formidable Enemy! The Warrior, Kaos" "kyōteki! takeshi shō kaosu" (Japanese: 強敵! 猛将カオス)	Hitoyuki Matsui	Yoshiyuki Suga	22 June 1996
13	"Buddy! The Bond of a Passionate Soul" "aibō! (badei) atsuki kokoro no kizuna" (Japanese: 相棒!(バディ)熱き心の絆)	Koitaro Aozame	Yoshiyuki Suga	29 June 1996
14	"Tragic! Maria Who Lives in the Graveyard" "higeki! hakaba no shōjo maria" (Japanese: 悲劇! 墓場の少女マリア)	Yukio Takahashi	Ryo Katsuragi	6 July 1996
15	"Blast! Message to the Reaper" "sakuretsu! shinigami e no ichigeki" (Japanese: 炸裂! 死神への一撃)	Yoshihiro Oda	Ryo Katsuragi	13 July 1996
16	"Revived! The Prism of Aura" "fukkatsu! goshiki no rinkō" (Japanese: 復活! 五色の燐光)	Kiyoshi Fukumoto	Nobuaki Kishima	20 July 1996
17	"Appear! Shadow X!" "shutsugen ! kuroi ekkusu" (Japanese: 出現! 黒いエックス)	Kiyotaka Itani	Yoshiyuki Suga	27 July 1996
18	"The Dark! Fear of the Underhell" "ankoku! andāheru no kyōfu" (Japanese: 暗黒!アンダーヘルの恐怖)	Atsushi Yano	Nobuaki Kishima	3 August 1996
19	"Desperate! X's Death" "kesshi! ekkusu no saigo" (Japanese: 決死! エックスの最後)	Ryo Yasumura	Yoshiyuki Suga	10 August 1996
20	"Life! Break Heart" "seimei! (inochi) bureiku hāto" (Japanese: 生命!(いのち)ブレイク・ハート)	Yukio Takahashi	Nobuaki Kishima	17 August 1996
21	"Reborn! The Neo B't X" "Shinsei! B'T ekkusu tanjō" (Japanese: 新生! B'Tエックス誕生)	Kiyoshi Fukumoto	Nobuaki Kishima	24 August 1996
22	"The Worst! The Area's Seven Evil Knights" "saikyō! eria no shichi mashō" (Japanese: 最凶! エリアの七魔将)	Kiyotaka Itani	Sukehiro Tomita	31 August 1996
23	"Flash of Light! Shining Knuckle" "senkō! shainingu nakkuru" (Japanese: 閃光! シャイニング・ナックル)	Atsushi Yano	Nobuaki Kishima	7 September 1996
24	"Burn! A Piece of the Sun" "enjō! taiyō no kakera" (Japanese: 炎上! 太陽のかけら)	Hitoyuki Matsui	Nobuaki Kishima	14 September 1996
25	"Overthrow! B'T Raphael" "datō! B'T rafaero" (Japanese: 打倒! B'Tラファエロ)	Mamoru Hamatsu	Sukehiro Tomita	21 September 1996

==== Season 2: B't X Neo (1997) ====
No. overall	No. in season	Title	Original release date
26	1	"The Four Knights vs. The Evil Knights" "reishō vs mashō" (Japanese: 霊将VS魔将)	21 August 1997
27	2	"The Land of Love and Hate" "ai to nikushimi no chi!" (Japanese: 愛と憎しみの地!)	28 August 1997
28	3	"Burning Red Flame!" "guren no honō" (Japanese: 紅蓮の炎)	4 September 1997
29	4	"Miracles of the Blood" "buraddo no kiseki!" (Japanese: ブラッドの奇跡!)	11 September 1997
30	5	"Fear of the Illusions" "mugen no kyōfu!" (Japanese: 夢幻の恐怖!)	18 September 1997
31	6	"A Streak of Light" "ichijō no hikari!" (Japanese: 一条の光!)	25 September 1997
32	7	"Mehr Licht (More light)" "mēru rihito! (motto hikari o)" (Japanese: メール リヒト!(もっと光を))	2 October 1997
33	8	"Confessions of a Mask" "kamen no kokuhaku!" (Japanese: 仮面の告白!)	9 October 1997
34	9	"Blood Bonds" "chi no kizuna" (Japanese: 血の絆)	16 October 1997
35	10	"The Lair of the Beast" "akuma no hōkō" (Japanese: 悪魔の咆哮)	23 October 1997
36	11	"Search for a Lost Era!" "ushinawareta kako o motome te!" (Japanese: 失われた過去を求めて!)	30 October 1997
37	12	"One for All" (Japanese: ONE FOR ALL!)	6 November 1997
38	13	"Memories of the Future!" "mirai no kioku!" (Japanese: 未来の記憶!)	13 November 1997
39	14	"A Piece of the Sun!" (Japanese: A PIECE OF THE SUN!)	20 November 1997

=== Other media ===
A pachinko game was released in 2013, with newly recorded music and animation done by TMS.

Two toy-lines were produced by Takara in conjunction with the broadcast of the series. The first series consisted of 5 models of four of the main B'ts, and where marketed with the term "Solid Scan". Each Bt had removable armor and an accompanying figure to ride them. A wield-able "Messiah Fist" was also produced with sound-effects and light-up features. The second toyline was produced as action figures and included 14 B'ts with an accompanying smaller figure. 8 non-articulated figures were also released of several main characters under the term "Donor".

== Reception ==
Chris Beveridge of Mania.com reviewed the first DVD volume of the anime series by Illumitoon Entertainment and gave the volume a "C" grade citing that "due to age there isn't a lot to expect" in regards to both audio and visual quality. Beveridge continued to praise the story but also said that it was sometimes confusing. Ilumitoon's decision to use their dubbed script as subtitles for the Japanese audio was heavily criticized as they did not match up.
