= Saint Seiya: Dark Wing =

Japanese manga series

- First tankōbon volume cover, featuring Wyvern Shōichirō

聖闘士星矢(セイントセイヤ) 冥王異伝 ダークウィング (Seinto Seiya Meiō Iden Dāku Uingu)
- Genre: Isekai
- Created by: Masami Kurumada
- Manga
- Written by: Kenji Saitō
- Illustrated by: Shinshū Ueda
- Published by: Akita Shoten
- English publisher: NA: Titan Comics
- Imprint: Champion Red Comics
- Magazine: Champion Red
- Original run: December 19, 2020 – present
- Volumes: 8
- icon

Saint Seiya: Dark Wing (Japanese: 聖闘士星矢(セイントセイヤ) 冥王異伝 ダークウィング, Hepburn: Seinto Seiya Meiō Iden Dāku Uingu; lit. 'Saint Seiya: An Alternate Tale of the Underworld Emperor – Dark Wing') is a Japanese manga series written by Kenji Saitō and illustrated by Shinshū Ueda. It is a spin-off of the manga series Saint Seiya by Masami Kurumada. The manga started serialization in Akita Shoten's monthly magazine Champion Red in December 2020.

== Plot ==
The story follows Shōichirō, an ordinary high school boy, who after a certain incident wakes up in the land of the dead, where he discovers that he was chosen to become one of the 108 Specters of Hades, one of the three Judges of the Underworld, the dark dragon Wyvern. Soon he discovered that many of his classmates and teachers were chosen to join the army of Hades or the army of Athena.

== Characters ==
=== Athena's Army ===
- Cattleya Mikagami (水鏡 カトレア, Mikagami Katorea) is a cheerful second-year student at Graad International University High School and a skilled archer. Unaware of her own nature, she is the reincarnation of the goddess Athena. Her powers awaken after she witnesses an attack that claims the life of her childhood friend, Shōichirō. Taken to the Sanctuary, she is recognized by the Gold Saints as their goddess. Athena prepares for a war against Hades, only to discover a hidden enemy manipulating the conflict from the shadows.

==== Gold Saints ====
- Aries Theseus (牡羊座のテセウス, Ariesu no Teseusu)
- Taurus Ain (牡牛座のアイン, Taurusu no Ain)
- Gemini Sōjirō (双子座の惣次郎, Jemini no Sōjirō), also known as Sōjirō Tokito (時任 惣次郎, Tokito Sōjirō), is the main protagonist of the story along with his twin brother Wyvern Sōichirō.
- Cancer Crematório (蟹座のクリマトーリオ, Kyansā no Kurimatōrio)
- Leo Vassilios (獅子座のヴァシリオス, Reo no Vashiriosu)
- Virgo Renge (乙女座のレンゲ, Barugo no Renge)
- Libra Kōgetsuki (天秤座の紅月姫, Raibura no Kōgetsuki)
- Scorpio Eulalia (蠍座のエウラリア, Sukōpion no Euraria)
- Sagittarius Aiolos (射手座のアイオロス, Sajitariasu no Aiorosu)
- Capricorn Eito (山羊座の詠斗, Kapurikōn no Eito)
- Aquarius Tristan (水瓶座のトリスタン, Akueriasu no Torisutan)
- Pisces Alfreid (魚座のアルフリード, Pisukesu no Arufurīdo)

=== Hades's Army ===
- Hades is the god and ruler of the Underworld. In order to reincarnate on Earth, he possesses the body of a human with the purest soul. Hypnos, the loyal servant of Hades, selects a child named Mayoi Tsukishima (月嶋 真宵, Tsukishima Mayoi), brother of Yoruhime, as the vessel for his soul.
- Yoruhime Tsukishima (月嶋 夜姫, Tsukishima Yoruhime) is the reincarnation of Pandora and commander of Hades's army. The god Hypnos awakened her true nature to protect her younger brother, the vessel for Hades's soul. She enrolls at Graad International University High School to observe Athena's reincarnation, Cattleya Mikagami. A mysterious attack during a school trip results in her death and that of a student, Shōichirō. In Elysium, she discovers the Underworld has been destroyed and, holding Athena responsible, marshals Hades's forces for the coming conflict.

==== Judges of the Underworld ====
- Wyvern Shōichirō (ワイバーンの翔一郎, Waibān no Shōichirō), also known as Shōichirō Tokito (時任 翔一郎, Tokitō Shōichirō), is a kind-hearted second-year student at Graad International University High School, known for his skill in playing the piano. He grows up alongside his twin brother, Gemini Sōjirō, and their friend Cattleya Mikagami, developing feelings for a fellow student, Yoruhime Tsukishima. During a school ship trip, a catastrophic attack sinks the vessel. While attempting to save Yoruhime, Shōichirō falls into the sea and, wishing for strength, is consumed by a dark wyvern figure. He awakens one year later in Elysium, chosen to serve in the army of Hades.
- Garuda Matsuri (ガルーダのマツリ, Garūda no Matsuri)
- Griffon Lucas (グリフォンのルーカス, Gurifon no Rūkasu)

==== Specters ====
- Necromancer Charlotte (ネクロマンサーのシャルロット, Nekuromansā no Sharurotto)
- Laelaps Suzuri (ライラプスの鈴里, Rairapusu no Suzuri)
- Harpy Zhu (ハーピーの朱, Hāpī no Shū)
- Sphinx Esther (スフィンクスのエステル, Sufinkusu no Esuteru)

== Publication ==
Written by Kenji Saitō and illustrated by Shinshū Ueda, Saint Seiya: Dark Wing started in Akita Shoten's seinen manga magazine Champion Red on December 19, 2020. It is set to end on November 19, 2026. Akita Shoten has collected its chapters into individual tankōbon volumes. The first volume was released on June 18, 2021.

On March 6, 2025, Titan Comics announced that it had licensed the series for English publication, with the first volume being released on September 16, 2025.

=== Volumes ===
No.	Original release date	Original ISBN	English release date	English ISBN
1	June 18, 2021	978-4-253-32021-4	September 16, 2025	978-1-787-74718-0
001. "Black Wing Young" (黒翼の少年, Kuro Tsubasa no Shōnen); 002. "The Underworld King's Mission" (冥王の使命, Meiō no Shimei); 003. "Gemini Young" (双子座の少年, Futagoza no Shōnen); 004. "Pluto's Thoughts" (冥王星の思感, Meiōsei no Shitau-kan); 005. "Sagittarius Meteor" (射手座の流星, Iteza no Ryūsei)
2	January 20, 2022	978-4-253-32021-4	December 16, 2025	978-1-787-74719-7
006. "Servant of the Princess of the Underworld" (冥界姫の従者, Meikai Hime no Jūsha); 007. "Agent of Justice" (正義の代行者, Seigi no Daikōsha); 008. "Violent Microcosm" (暴虐の小宇宙, Bōgyaku no Shōuchū); 009. "Goddess Awakening" (女神の覚醒, Megami no Kakusei); 010. "Gold Saints" (黄金聖闘士, Gōrudo Seinto)
3	September 20, 2022	978-4-253-32023-8	May 19, 2026	978-1-787-74720-3
011. "Pandora" (パンドラ); 012. "Awakening" (目覚め, Mezame); 013. "Galactic Explosion" (銀河の炸裂, Ginga no Sakuretsu); 014. "Summit Showdown" (頂上対決, Chōjō Taiketsu); 015. "Dark Archer" (暗黒の射手, Ankoku no Ite); 016. "Goddess Wish" (女神の願い, Megami no Negai); 017. "Capricorn's Revenge" (復讐の山羊座, Fukushū no Kapurikōn)
4	June 20, 2023	978-4-253-32024-5	October 13, 2026	978-1-787-74721-0
018. "Eito Kuzuryū's True Power" (九頭龍詠斗の真の力, Kuzuryū Eito no Shin no Chikara); 019. "Dedication and Determination" (意地と覚悟, Iji to Kakugo); 020. "A Great Decision" (偉大なる決定, Idainaru Kettei); 021. "Awakening 2" (目覚め II, Mezame Tsū); 022. "Squirming" (蠢動, Shundō); 023. "Heavenly Shadow" (天貴の影, Tenki no Kage)
5	January 18, 2024	978-4-253-32025-2	—	—
024. "Golden Scorpion Princess" (黄金の蠍姫, Kogane no Sasori Hime); 025. "The Balance of Truth" (真実の天秤, Shinjitsu no Tenbin); 026. "Sword King" (剣王騎 Ken'ōki); 027. "Fist vs. Blade" (拳VS剣, Ken Bāsasu Ken); 028. "Griffon the Heavenly Noble Star" (天貴星グリフォン, Tenkisei Gurifon); 029. "A Scorpion in the Cage" (籠中の蠍, Kago no Sasori)
6	August 20, 2024	978-4-253-32026-9	—	—
030. "Scorpio's Deadly Plan" (蠍座の必殺の策, Sukōpion no Hissatsu no Saku); 031. "The Memoirs of Surplice" (冥衣の記憶, Sāpurisu no Kioku); 032. "The Witch" (魔女, Majo); 033. "Harpy the Heavenly Wailing Star" (天哭星ハーピー, Tenkokusei Hāpī); 034. "The Bodies and Souls of the Specters" (冥闘士の器と魂, Meitōshi no Utsuwa to Tamashii); 035. "The Warriors of Gold vs. The Knights of Drama" (黄金の戦士VS戯曲の騎士, Ōgon no Senshi Bāsasu Gikyoku no Kishi)
7	March 18, 2025	978-4-253-32027-6	—	—
036. "Golden Fighting Spirit" (黄金の闘志, Ōgon no Tōshi); 037. "The Attack of Gemini" (双子座の一撃, Futagoza no Ichigeki); 038. "The Descent of the Evil God Yaldabaoth" (邪神ヤルダバオトの降臨, Jashin Yarudabaoto no Kōrin); 039. "The True Motive of the Evil God" (邪神の真意, Jashin no Shin'i); 040. "Great Annihilation" (大いなる破滅, Dainaru Hametsu)
8	December 19, 2025	978-4-253-00933-1	—	—
041. "The Potential of Humans" (人の持つ可能性, Hito no Motsu Kanōsei); 042. "The Fate-Breaking Twins" (運命を破壊する双子, Unmei o Hakaisuru Futago); 043. "An Ordinary Girl" (普通の女の子, Futsū no Onna no Ko); 044. "For Peace and Justice" (正義と平和のために, Seigi to Heiwa no Tame ni); 045. "The Shadow of the Dark Cosmos" (昏き小宇宙の影, Kuraki Kosumo no Kage); 046. "The World of Absolute Zero" (絶対零度の世界, Zettaireido no Sekai); 047. "The Greatest Genius Ever Seen and the God of Creation" (全能の才と創世の神, Zennō no Sai to Sōsei no Kami)

=== Chapters not yet in tankōbon format ===
- 048. "A Golden Resonance, a Dark Omen" (黄金共鳴、暗い前兆, Ōgon Kyōmei, Kurai Zenchō)
- 049. "Gold Saint's Advice" (黄金聖闘士の忠告, Ōgon Kiyoshi Tōshi no Chūkoku)
- 050. "Descending, Demiurge" (降臨、デミウルゴス, Kōrin , Demiurugosu)

== See also ==
- Trinity Seven, another manga series by the same writer
