= Masami Kurumada =

Japanese manga artist and writer (born 1953)

- Born: December 6, 1953 (age 72); Tsukishima, Chuo, Tokyo, Japan
- Occupations: Manga artist, composer, producer
- Years active: 1974 – present
- Employer(s): Shueisha, Akita Shoten, Kurumada Pro
- Known for: Saint Seiya; Ring ni Kakero; Fūma no Kojirō; B'T X Ring ni Kakero 2
- Website: Official website

Masami Kurumada (車田 正美, Kurumada Masami; born December 6, 1953) is a Japanese manga artist and writer, known for specializing in fighting manga featuring bishōnen and magical boys.

He is the founder of the manga studio Kurumada Productions or Kurumadapro for short. He achieved fame as the creator of popular manga, such as Ring ni Kakero, Fūma no Kojirō, Saint Seiya and B't X. The male characters in his works often display very masculine qualities and traits, and display courage through sacrifice, selflessness and true heroism. He has won the Best Success award with Saint Seiya and the Best Inspiration award with Ring ni Kakero.

== Profile ==
Kurumada's first work was Otoko Raku, which earned him an award in a manga contest for aspiring manga artist, and became assistant to professional manga artists. Some time later, he debuted as a professional manga artist in 1974 with his manga Sukeban Arashi, and achieved his first hit three years later when he started writing and drawing Ring ni Kakero, which brought him recognition as a popular manga author, and lasted five years, and he considers it his favorite creation. A practicer of the martial arts in his younger days, the influence this has exerted on his various works is worthy of mention.

Also, in the same manner as many manga artists today, Kurumada employs the revered Osamu Tezuka's Star System manga technique, which is essentially resorting to the use of a stable cast of characters in his various works (characters keep the same appearance and personality, but sometimes the author gives them new names and different roles than in previous works). Because of this, the main characters of his works most of the time bear a resemblance to Takane Ryūji, the protagonist of Ring ni Kakero. The main characters of his subsequent works have almost the same appearance and personality of Ryūji, specifically Jingi Kikukawa (Otoko Zaka), Kojirō (Fūma no Kojirō), Seiya (Saint Seiya), Teppei Takamiya (B't X), Shō (Silent Knight Shō), Aoi Tendō (Aoi Tori no Shinwa), Rindō Kenzaki (Ring ni Kakero 2), among others.

Besides Kurumada, other renowned manga artists that resort to the master Tezuka's technique include legendary authors Leiji Matsumoto, Monkey Punch and Shōtarō Ishinomori or Clamp. Clamp was heavily influenced by Kurumada's works, and they began their career as manga authors creating doujinshi based on Kurumada's characters. It is also known that anime adaptations aren't much to his liking, he prefers manga. He agreed that his works Fūma no Kojirō, Saint Seiya, Ring ni Kakero and B't X were adapted to anime, to follow the long-time tradition of popular manga having an animated adaptation.

His drawing style is very classic, reminiscent from the manga/anime aesthetics more predominant in the 1960s and 1970s, albeit a constant flaw in his art is an inconsistent trace and proportion unbalance. He often draws his characters as if seen from a low perspective. His drawings can sometimes seem rough, but the improvement in his artistic technique is evident when comparing older works to more recent ones. His coloring style is almost exclusively realistic, unlike the vast majority of manga artists, who often resort to the use of non-natural colors for the hair or eyes of their characters, although with the publication of Saint Seiya Next Dimension volumes totally in color, the addition of new characters with non-natural hair colors occurs often.

Certain graphics elements characteristic of his style can be found all over his works, mostly during fight sequences, having become widely known. Fans have created terms to refer to them such as Kurumada-ochi (車田落ち, Kurumada-ochi), meaning "Kurumada Fall", which designates the typical head-first falling characters, and Kurumada-futtobi (車田吹っ飛び, Kurumada-futtobi), meaning "Kurumada Launch", which refers to characters that are projected high into the air by opponents, to name a few.

Recurrent themes in his works are friendship, courage, redemption and sacrifice. Masculine virtue and qualities, honesty and honor are also traits often found in his characters. Male protagonists are very expressive with their emotions and can be very empathetic like the character of Shun in Saint Seiya.

Female characters in his works mostly play a much lesser role, but several ones with key roles can also be found, such as Rei Kojinyama (Sukeban Arashi), Kiku Takane (Ring ni Kakero) and Saori Kido (Saint Seiya). Women are often the strong mentors of the protagonist (as in B't X, Saint Seiya, Ring ni Kakero) and women have leading positions (Athena alias Saori Kido is the leader of the Saints in Saint Seiya).

Kurumada has stated in interviews that he obtains some creative influence from yesterday's authors considered masters of the manga medium today, such as Hiroshi Motomiya, Sanpei Shirato and Mitsuteru Yokoyama. He specially considers that Motomiya's works had a very strong impact and influence on him.

Kurumada also draws inspiration from universal knowledge and folklore, such as Greek mythology, Japanese and Chinese mythology, Buddhist and Hinduist doctrine, Trascendental philosophies, and classic works of literature, such as Dante Alighieri's The Divine Comedy, and Outlaws of the Marsh, to name a few.

His interest in boxing, wrestling and martial arts is well known, and he maintains close relations with renowned personalities of those circles. As he states in his website, he likes to drink with friends and to practice photography while jogging.

Among his works that have been cancelled due to failing to attract fans: Otoko Zaka, Silent Knight Shō and Aoi Tori no Shinwa. His works that suffered popularity decrease: B't X (which he successfully concluded without facing cancellation), and Saint Seiya. In Saint Seiya's case, Kurumada was forced by Shueisha, his publisher, to finish the manga after the Hades Arc, in 1991. He put his manga in hiatus after he finished the mentioned arc, and resumed it in 2006 with Saint Seiya Next Dimension. The anime adaptation of Saint Seiya experienced a popularity decrease during the anime-only Asgard arc, while the popularity of the original manga was still strong; the anime back in 1989, was in pre-production of the episodes that would adapt the Hades arc of the manga. Because of low popularity of the anime adaptation, the project was suspended and remained so until 2003, when it was resumed and the Hades arc of the manga finally was adapted to animation. The episodes that adapted the two final volumes of the manga were aired in between May and August 2008, finally leaving Kurumada's manga completely adapted to anime.

In 2004, Kurumada celebrated 30 years as a professional manga artist, and that same year two of his older and best known works experienced a resurfacing. The original Ring ni Kakero was adapted to anime, 27 years after its manga debut, and as mentioned before, the Saint Seiya anime adaptation was resumed in 2003 and an attempt to start the Zeus Chapter was made with the release of the Saint Seiya Tenkai-Hen Josō ~Overture~ movie in 2004, which was planned to continue the story with the subsequent release of OVAs, but due to discrepancies between Kurumada and Toei Animation, the project failed and was abandoned. Kurumada still plans to publish the "Zeus Chapter", written and drawn by him, in manga form in the near future, by 2012, a considerable amount of elements from it have already been revealed by Kurumada in Saint Seiya Next Dimension and he is set to continue doing so in the next instalments of that work in the japanese summer in 2013.

Kurumada's works have had influence on manga authors and related media. Worthy of mention is Yudetamago's Kinnikuman, Hiroshi Kawamoto's Tenkū Senki Shurato, Clamp's Magic Knight Rayearth, Kōichi Tokita's Mobile Fighter G Gundam, Hajime Yatate and Ryuichi Hoshino's Yoroiden Samurai Troopers, Yoshihiro Togashi's YuYu Hakusho, videogames such as the World Heroes series and The King of Fighters series, among others. References to his works by other authors can be found in the mentioned videogames and in popular manga, such as Kōsuke Fujishima's Aa! Megami-sama, Kenjirō Hata's Hayate no Gotoku, Chika Umino's Honey & Clover, Tite Kubo's BLEACH, and their respective anime adaptations, among others.

French director Louis Leterrier has cited Kurumada and his manga Saint Seiya having a great impact on him since his youth. In 2010, Masami Kurumada was contacted by Warner Brothers to collaborate in a project for Leterrier's mythologically themed motion picture Clash of the Titans, remake of the original 1981 film. Kurumada authored promotional illustrations depicting pivotal scenes from the film. Countless are the products of merchandise (action figures, T-shirts, toys, video games, etc.) relative the works of Kurumada, sold all over the worlds with great success. His fans are usually referred to as "Masamists".

== Works ==
=== Manga ===
Masami Kurumada, as he appeared in the first episode of the Ring ni Kakero 1 anime adaptation. His character's design was based on the protagonist of his manga Jitsuroku! Shinwakai, who shares his name, and the kanji in his clothes read Shinwakai, as a reference to it. He also voiced the character in the episode.

His manga works listed chronologically and their duration:

Publication date	Title	Magazine	Volumes
1974–1975	Sukeban Arashi (スケ番あらし, lit. Delinquent Storm)	Weekly Shōnen Jump	2
1977–1981	Ring ni Kakero (リングにかけろ, lit. Put It All in the Ring)	Weekly Shōnen Jump	25
1979–1983	Jitsuroku! Shinwakai (実録！神輪会, lit. Record It! The Gathering of the Gods)	Monthly Shōnen Jump	1
1982–1983	Fūma no Kojirō (風魔の小次郎, lit. Kojirō of the Fūma Clan)	Weekly Shōnen Jump	10
1982–1988 (on hiatus)	Raimei no Zaji (雷鳴のザジ, lit. Lightning Zaji)	Fresh Jump	1
1984–2023	Otoko Zaka (男坂, lit. Men's Hill)	Weekly Shōnen Jump → Shōnen Jump+	11
1986–1990	Saint Seiya (聖闘士星矢)	Weekly Shōnen Jump → V Jump	28
1992 (cancelled)	Silent Knight Shō (サイレントナイト翔)	Weekly Shōnen Jump	2
1993–1994	Akaneiro no Kaze (あかね色の風, lit. Vermillion Wind)	Super Jump	1
1994–2000	B't X (ビート・エックス)	Shōnen Ace	16
1996	Evil Crusher Maya (エビルクラッシャー魔矢)	Shōnen Gangan	1
2000–2008	Ring ni Kakero 2 (リングにかけろ2, lit. Put It All in the Ring 2)	Super Jump	26
2006–2024	Saint Seiya: Next Dimension (聖闘士星矢 ネクストディメンション 冥王神話)	Weekly Shōnen Champion	16
2015	Indigo Period (藍の時代, Ai no Jidai)	Weekly Shōnen Champion	1
2019	Fūma no Kojirō: Jo no Maki (風魔の小次郎 序の巻, lit. Kojirō of the Fūma Clan: Prelude to a Tale)	Champion Red	1
2022–2025	Fūma no Kojirō Gaiden: Asuka Mumyōchō (風魔の小次郎 外伝 飛鳥無明帖, lit. Kojirō of the Fūma Clan – Side Story: Asuka's Harmful Book)	Champion Red	1
2024–2026	Saint Seiya: Then (聖闘士星矢 THEN)	Champion Red	-
2026–	Saint Seiya: Heaven Chapter (聖闘士星矢 天界篇)	Weekly Shōnen Champion	-

=== One-shots ===
- Mikeneko Rock (1975)
- Mabudachi Jingi (Jingi the True Friend, 1979)
- Shiro-Obi Taishō (White-Belt Champion, 1979)
- Blue Myth (青い鳥の神話 Aoi Tori no Shinwa, 1992)
- Seiya ni Kane wa Naru (The Bells That Ring in the Holy Night, 2021)

=== Books ===
- Cosmo Special (1988)
- Burning Blood (1996, artbook)
- Honō no Tamashī (炎の魂 Fire Soul, 2000, data collection)
- Saint Seiya Encyclopedia (2001, Artbook and character data collection)
- Saint Seiya Sora Kurumada Masami Illustrations (2004, Artbook and issues data collection)
- Saint Seiya: Gigantomachia (2002, a non-canonical sidestory novel written by Tatsuya Hamazaki)
- Raimei-ni Kike (Listen in the Lightning, 2006)
- Masami Kurumada best bout! 2 vol. (2014)
- "Saint Seiya 30 Shunen Kinen Gashu, Seiiki – Sanctuary Artbook (2016)".
- Saint Seiya: Golden Age (2016, a non-canonical sidestory novel written by Shiori Teshirogi, storyboard by Megamu Okada and illustred by Chimaki Kouri and Yun Koga)

=== Anime adaptations of his works ===
- Saint Seiya (1986–1989, 114 episodes).
- Fūma no Kojirō (1989–1990, 12 OVA episodes).
- B't X (1996, 25 episodes)
- B't Neo (1997, complementary to B't X, 14 OVA episodes).
- Ring ni Kakero 1 (2004–2011, 36 episodes)
- Saint Seiya – The Hades Arc (2002–2008, complementary to Saint Seiya, 31 OVA episodes).
- Saint Seiya: The Lost Canvas (2009–2011, animated adaptation of the alternative work of the same name, 26 OVA episodes)
- Saint Seiya Omega (2012–2014, an anime original story series, 97 episodes).
- Saint Seiya: Soul of Gold (2015, anime original story series, 13 episodes ONA).
- Knights of the Zodiac (2019, reboot/remake, 36 episodes)

=== Anime movie adaptations of his works ===
- Saint Seiya: Evil Goddess Eris (1987)
- Saint Seiya: The Heated Battle of the Gods (1988)
- Saint Seiya: Legend of the Crimson Youth (1989)
- Saint Seiya: Warriors of the Final Holy Battle (1989)
- Fūma no Kōjirō: Fūma Hanran-Hen (1992)
- Saint Seiya: Heaven Chapter − Overture (2004)
- Saint Seiya: Legend of Sanctuary (CGI motion picture, 2014).

=== Live-action adaptations of his works ===
- Fūma no Kojirō (TV tokusatsu drama of 13 episodes for the Fūma VS Yasha arc)
- Saint Seiya Musical: A short-lived adaptation of the Sanctuary arc and the Poseidon arc from Kurumada's manga for the musical theatre, 1991.
- Saint Seiya – Super Musical: A live-action adaptation of the first Saint Seiya film for the musical theatre, 2011.
- Knights of the Zodiac: The Beginning, 2023. A Japanese/American live action film, based on author Kurumada's comic book.

=== Spin-off/works commissioned by Kurumada to others authors where Kurumada is supervisor ===
- Saint Seiya Episode G (2002–2013, commissioned by Kurumada to Megumu Okada)
- Fūma no Kojirō: Yagyū Ansatsuchō (2003 -??, commissioned by Kurumada to Yuri Satoshi)
- Saint Seiya Lost Canvas (2006–2011, commissioned by Kurumada to Shiori Teshirogi)
- Saint Seiya Lost Canvas Anecdotes (2011–2016, commissioned by Kurumada to Shiori Teshirogi)
- Saint Seiya - Saintia Shō (2013–2021, commissioned by Kurumada to Chimaki Kuori)
- Saint Seiya Episode G Assassin (2014–2019, commissioned by Kurumada to Megumu Okada)
- Saint Seiya Episode G Requiem (2019–present, commissioned by Kurumada to Megumu Okada)
- Kurumada Suikoden – Hero of Heroes (2014–present, commissioned by Kurumada to Yun Kōga, a manga series gathering Kurumada's most prominent protagonists, to commemorate Kurumada's 40th anniversary as a manga artist)
- Saint Seiya: Meiō Iden – Dark Wing (2020–present, commissioned by Kurumada to Kenji Saito and Shinsu Ueda.)
- Saint Seiya Rerise of Poseidon (2021–2026, commissioned by Kurumada to Suda Tsunakan, this manga is done in the same drawing style as Masami Kurumada's)
- Saint Seiya Time Odyssey (2022–present, commissioned by Kurumada to Jérôme Alquié)
- Saint Mariya (2025–present, commissioned by Kurumada to Seira Shimotsuki)

Out of all of them, Saint Seiya is his most famous work in the western world but in Japan, also its Ring ni Kakero (1 and 2) is a work of considerable success, which is the longest of Kurumada's works, at 51 collected volumes.

Saint Seiya, is collected in 28 volumes to date, and has been resumed by Kurumada with Saint Seiya Next Dimension, the continuation to his original manga, ending the hiatus the work remained in since 1991, and to date adds 16 more volumes to the original Saint Seiya manga, for a total or 44 volumes. The third longest is B't X, collected in 16. As stated before, Anime adaptations have been made for Saint Seiya, Fūma no Kojirō, B't X, and Ring ni Kakero, all closely follow his source manga works.

Saint Seiya videogames have been released for old consoles such as Famicom/NES, Game Boy and more recently various video games for PlayStation 2 (2006–2008) and for PlayStation 3 (2011), and a Saint Seiya Omega game for PSP was released in December 2012, and Saint Seiya: Brave Soldiers released in 2013 for PlayStation 3 and Saint Seiya: Soldiers' Soul released in 2015 for PlayStation 3 and PlayStation 4 and PC. Recently, Ring ni Kakero has also been the theme for Pachinko game machines, as well as Saint Seiya, on which a recently released pachinko machine is based.

Saint Seiya Myth Cloth is a successful line of figures that started in 2003 and is still in production based on the many characters of the original Saint Seiya by Kurumada. Several successful action figure lines of Masami Kurumada's Saint Seiya have been created over the years.

Kurumada working has worked of the Saint Seiya Next Dimension (a prequel and continuation to his classic manga series in which Hades recalls his fight with the previous Pegasus Saint in the 18th century). It was revealed by Kurumada and Akita Shōten that Saint Seiya Next Dimension holds a canonical status in the universe of Saint Seiya, and it is also its legitimate continuation. He recently finished Ring ni Kakero 2, in 2009, after a successful run of 9 years. A live-action series of Fūma no Kojirō was released on Japanese TV. He recently started working on a new manga series Raimei-ni Kike.

He also has authorized another manga authors to write and draw sidestories for his manga Saint Seiya, commissioning various spinoffs on Saint Seiya, for example: specifically Saint Seiya Episode G, written and drawn by Megumu Okada, and Saint Seiya Lost Canvas, written and drawn by Shiori Teshirogi. Since these two works are not authored by Kurumada, but only authorized and supervised by him, the events depicted in them and the characters created for them are still considered non-canonical, unlike Next Dimension which holds an official canonical status.

Kurumada had most of his works published by Shueisha, in the prestigious Shūkan Shōnen Jump manga magazine. He began publishing his works with Kadokawa Shoten, in their magazine Gekkan Shōnen Ace. In 1995 he resumed his relations with Shueisha and began publishing with them again, and his latest works and the current ones have been published by that company to date, excluding Saint Seiya Lost Canvas, published by Akita Shoten in the Weekly Shōnen Champion manga magazine, Saint Seiya Next Dimension, published in the Shōnen Ace manga magazine and Raimei-ni Kike, published by Akita Shoten in the Champion Red manga magazine.

In 2012, Kurumada revealed the upcoming anime television series, Saint Seiya Omega. Described as an anime original story, separate from Kurumada's canon, the series will take place 25 years after the events in Kurumada's Saint Seiya manga. The series began airing in April that year, and has been renewed for a second season that started in April 2013.

In 2014 Masami Kurumada was the executive producer of a CGI remake of the Sanctuary chapter called Saint Seiya: Legend of Sanctuary.

In 2016, marking 30 years since the original release of the Saint Seiya manga, two commemorative exhibitions were held in Tokyo and Hong Kong in which numerous commemorative merchandising products related to Saint Seiya were also sold.

For the 2017 season, Masami Kurumada has designed and collaborated on the Japanese baseball team shirt 広島東洋カープ "Hiroshima Toyo carp"

In 2019, a new animated adaptation of Kurumada's original Saint Seiya manga, is started to be created by Toei Animation and Netflix, is published worldwide on the same platform. The series is made in CGI.

A live action film based on the original Saint Seiya by Masami Kurumada released in 2023 in cinemas worldwide.

Chinese Tencent has produce in China of the advertisements live-action with of the characters of Saint Seiya by Masami Kurumada.

June 2019 in Taiwan there was an exhibition on the works of the master Masami Kurumada, with very many drawings drawn from his works and also various armor taken from his Saint Seiya manga, all reconstructed in natural scale on a 1: 1 scale.

In recent years, he has worked on expanding his other works such as Otokozaka, Fuma no Kojiro, and supervised various new Saint Seiya spinoffs such as Saintia Sho, Rerise of the Poseidon, Saint Seiya Dark Wing, Saint Mariya.

On 2 September 2026, Kurumada announced that he filed a lawsuit against multiple people—including a former board director who used to serve as his manager—for embezzling ¥4.6 billion. The lawsuit alleged that from 2018 to 2024, the defendants siphoned off company funds and licensing fee payments from three of Kurumada's companies overseeing his copyrights and royalties. As ¥1.8 billion had already been recovered, Kurumada sought compensation for the remaining ¥2.8 billion.

== Songs ==
Masami Kurumada wrote the lyrics to many of the songs used in the anime adaptations of his manga series. A CD compiling the songs was released in December 2005 with an extra song to Otoko Zaka, the CD is called Kurumada: The Complete Works.

The following songs are included:

- 01. いかなる星の下に〜We're fearless warriors〜
- 02. 星よ流れるな〜Stop the fate〜
- 03. 少年記 I〜Burning Blood〜
- 04. 少年記 II〜Leave my heart〜
- 05. 風の戦士
- 06. あの日風の中で・・・
- 07. 君を守りたい
- 08. 信じる心
- 09. 光を探して
- 10. いつか聞いた風の歌
- 11. 風に向かって走れ〜standing & fight〜
- 12. 名も無き野の花〜fulfill your dream〜
- 13. 純情ケンカチャンピオン〜one way boy〜
- 14. いばらの旋律〜Melody〜
- 15. 覇道のディスタンス〜Distance〜
- 16. ｢明日への闘志｣
- 17.男坂

After the CD was released Kurumada wrote the lyrics to the intro and ending song of the credits sequence of the 'Inferno' stage of the Hades arc of the Saint Seiya anime adaptation (Episodes 128 to 145).

- "Megami no Senshi, Pegasus Forever"
- "Takusu mono he ~ My Dear"

Also, he wrote the lyrics to the ending theme of the second season of the Ring ni Kakero 1 anime adaptation, in 2006:

- Shining like Gold 〜思い出の欠片〜 (Omoide no kakera)

For the final episodes that completed the adaptation of the Hades arc of his Saint Seiya manga to anime, a new song for the credits roll was composed with Kurumada authoring the lyrics. The episodes aired in mid 2008.

- "Kami no Sono – Del Regno"

Also, Kurumada had a short role as a voice actor in the anime adaptation of his manga Ring ni Kakero. He appeared in the first episode, as himself and as the Jitsuroku! Shinwakai protagonist, who shares his name, and he provided his voice to both.

Continuing his contributions as lyricist, Kurumada wrote the lyrics to the ending theme of the first and second season of the Saint Seiya: The Lost Canvas anime:

- "Hana no Kusari"

Additionally, the release of a new CD containing the rest of songs with lyrics authored by Kurumada for the anime adaptations of his works Saint Seiya and Ring ni Kakero, is set for 2013. The compilation is titled "Kurumada: The Complete Works 2" and includes some previously released material. The songs included in the CD:

- 01. 明日 へ の 闘志
- 02. 思い出 の 欠片 ~Shining like gold~
- 03. 誓い の 時 ~Strike anywhere~
- 04. 明日 へ の 飛翔 ~Flap your wings~
- 05. 拳 よ 空 翔けろ ~Rough and ready~
- 06. 虹 の 彼方
- 07. 女神 の 戦士 ~Megami no Senshi~
- 08. 託す 者 へ ~My Dear~
- 09. 神 の 園 ~Del Regno~
- 10. 花 の 鎖 ~Hana no kusari~
