= Sato (supermarket) =

Company headquartered in Kyoto Prefecture, Japan

- Native name: さとう (京都府)
- Industry: Supermarket
- Founded: 1666
- Headquarters: Koya store 15, Fukuchiyama, Kyoto Prefecture, Japan
- Key people: Shinjiro Sato (director)
- Website: www.sato-kyoto.com

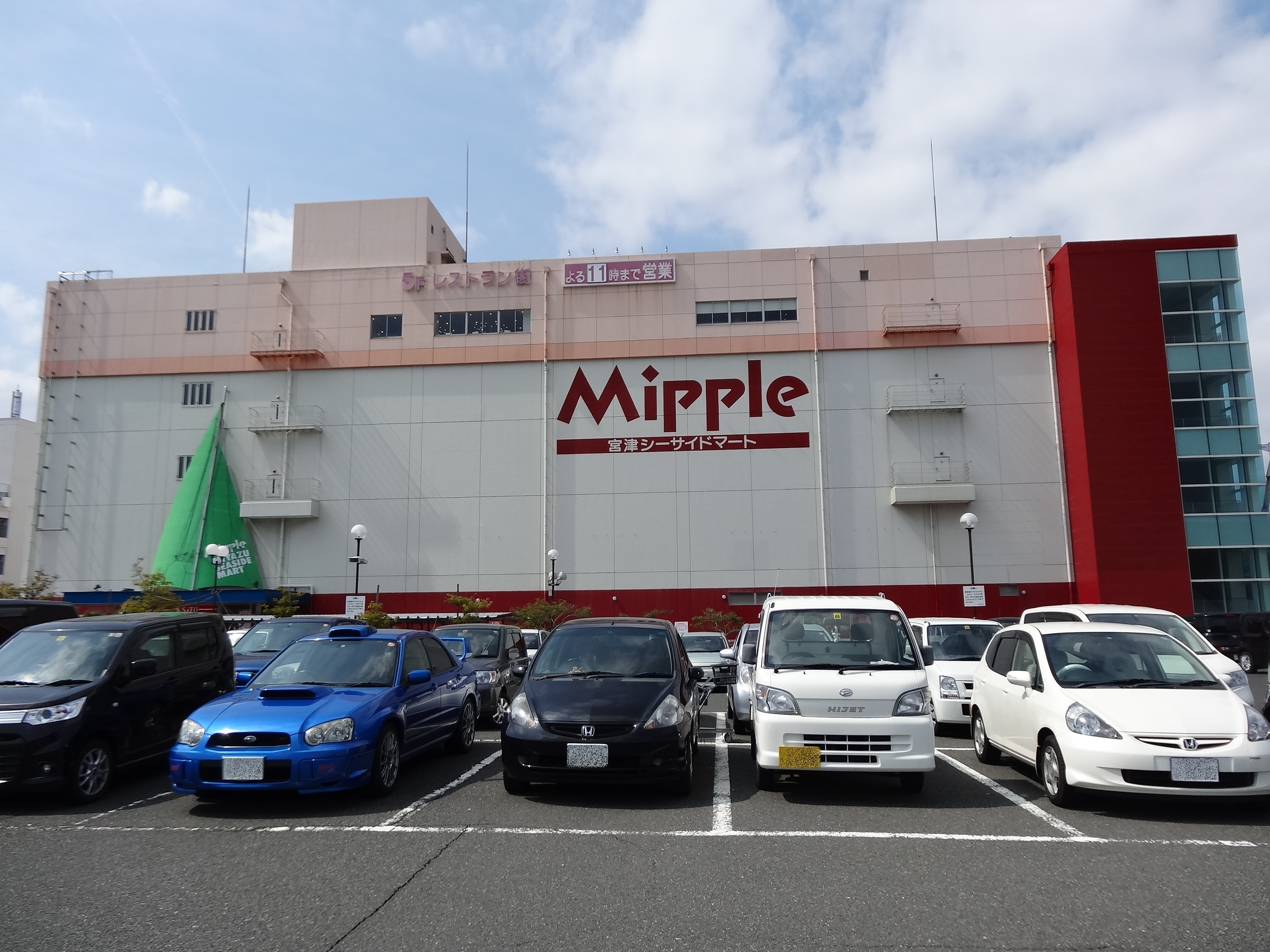
Miyazu Seaside Mart Mipple (Sato Miyazu store)

Sato Co., Ltd. is headquartered in Fukuchiyama city, Kyoto Prefecture, and is mainly a shopping center and supermarket business.

Main business is the retailing (supermarket), other activities include:

- family restaurants "Fuji No Nori", "Flower Fuji", "And Fuji"
- restaurant management
- "STOCK" and "STOCK hall" home centers
- clothing specialty shops "Rosa Plus" and "La Fonte"

Services include traveling, home delivery and insurance substitution services. In 2001 Rakuten opened an online shop dedicated to giftware items "Sato Airobu" and a wide range of retailing sectors. Company also develops stores.

Sato is a member of the Nichiri Group .

== See also ==
- List of oldest companies
