= Sato Company =

Brazilian dubbing and translation company

Sato Company is a Brazilian company largely specialized in the distribution of Asian audiovisual content to the local market. The company was founded in 1985 and is headquartered in Barueri, in the São Paulo metropolitan area.

== History ==
The company was established in 1985 by Nelson Sato (son of Japanese immigrants from Fukuoka and the youngest of eleven brothers) and initially distributed Japanese movies for the Brazilian home video market. After the initial attempts in distributing anime movies, the company inked an agreement with the now-defunct Rede Manchete to distribute tokusatsu series, such as Jaspion, Jiraya and the Ultraman franchise. These series gained a foothold on local television and subsequently started releasing licensed products. Sato was responsible for bringing Akira in 1991, with over 250,000 tickets sold in its one-year theatrical run. From then on, the company consolidated its sale of Japanese films, as well as some Chinese titles. Between 2012 and 2013, it started distributing Korean dramas and action movies to Netflix in Brazil.

In October 2007, Sato Company became responsible for the handling of SBT's international sales, as well as some Rede Bandeirantes titles. This coincided with Sato's licensing of Naruto to SBT.

The company developed a 13-installment program about pets using the license of the Italian character Topo Gigio in 2014. With the 2014 FIFA World Cup on the horizon, it announced a deal to distribute documentaries on key Brazilian soccer teams to Netflix in January of that year.

On July 8, 2016, it launched Wow!Play, an SVOD platform dedicated to anime and tokusatsus from its catalog, as well as some national content. Among the new titles available was Doraemon. On March 8, 2023, it launched Sato+, a FAST channel on Samsung TV Plus in Brazil, Sato+.
