= Saint Seiya: Next Dimension =

Japanese manga series

- Saint Seiya: Next Dimension – Myth of Hades
- First tankōbon volume cover, featuring Pegasus Tenma

聖闘士星矢(セイントセイヤ) NEXT DIMENSION 冥王神話 (Seinto Seiya Nekusuto Dimenshon Meiō Shinwa)
- Manga
- Written by: Masami Kurumada
- Published by: Akita Shoten
- Imprint: Shōnen Champion Comics
- Magazine: Weekly Shōnen Champion
- Original run: April 27, 2006 – July 4, 2024
- Volumes: 16
- Manga

Saint Seiya: Heaven Chapter
- Written by: Masami Kurumada
- Published by: Akita Shoten
- Magazine: Weekly Shōnen Champion
- Original run: May 14, 2026 – present
- icon

Saint Seiya: Next Dimension – Myth of Hades (Japanese: 聖闘士星矢(セイントセイヤ) NEXT DIMENSION 冥王神話, Hepburn: Seinto Seiya Nekusuto Dimenshon Meiō Shinwa) is a Japanese manga series written and illustrated by Masami Kurumada. It is a direct sequel to Kurumada's manga series Saint Seiya, while also serving as a prequel to the events presented in it. It was irregularly serialized for eighteen years in Akita Shoten's shōnen manga magazine Weekly Shōnen Champion from April 2006 to July 2024; its chapters were collected in 16 tankōbon volumes. The main plot is set in the 18th century during the previous "Holy War" with Athena, the Greek goddess of justice, wisdom, defensive war and heroic endeavor going to battle against Hades, the ruling god of the Underworld, and centers on the battles between each deity's warriors who are known as the Saints and the Specters, respectively, during that era.

Unlike the original work, Next Dimension was published in full color in its volume compilations, with the printed chapters in Weekly Shōnen Champion originally published in the standard black and white format of Japanese comics media, with occasional color pages.

A sequel by Kurumada, titled Saint Seiya: Heaven Chapter, started in Weekly Shōnen Champion in May 2026.

== Plot ==
Next Dimension resumes the story of Kurumada's original Saint Seiya manga by means of a flashback to the final battle of the Bronze Saints of Athena in the Hades arc. During the battle, Hades, the God of the Underworld recognizes Pegasus Seiya as the feared enemy he faced millennia ago, in the ages of myth, reincarnated in this era. The god is reminded of past incarnations and then reminisces about the events that occurred in the last war between Athena and himself 243 years earlier. During that era, a boy named Tenma was one of Athena's legendary warriors, the Saints. He was also the incarnation of Pegasus Seiya in the 18th century. Tenma was best friends with a boy named Alone, Hades' chosen vessel to inhabit in that era. As Alone became possessed by Hades, Tenma ventures to rescue him, meeting the Gold Saints Aries Shion and Libra Dohko and eventually suffering defeat at the hands of two of the Magnates from the Underworld. Surviving the encounter, the Saints return to Athena's Sanctuary to devise a strategy to prevent Hades from completing his machinations.

In the present time, Pegasus Seiya survived his death but is under a curse from Hades' sword that will kill him in three days. The current incarnation of Athena, Saori Kido, decides to save Seiya and is accompanied by the Bronze Saint, Andromeda Shun. They travel back in time with the aid of Chronos, but are sent further back than intended so that they end up during the previous holy war. They are separated and Athena is turned into a baby, but she is saved from harm by a Saint as it turns out the leader of the Sanctuary is in league with Hades.

Tenma meets Shun and is convinced of the situation and they race to rescue Athena. On their way through the twelve houses of the Zodiac they encounter and fight against several of the powerful Gold Saints and also Specters, warriors of Hades. They are also joined by Shun's older brother Phoenix Ikki and his comrades Dragon Shiryu and Cygnus Hyoga. Another looming threat is revealed: the cursed Saint from the ages of myth, the Ophiuchus Gold Saint Odysseus.

== Characters ==
- Pegasus Tenma: The 18th century incarnation of Pegasus Seiya.
- Alone: The purest soul in the 18th century and the previous human vessel for Hades, God of the Underworld. A young painter apprentice who is an orphan and a close friend to Tenma.
- Aries Shion: A former Bronze Saint promoted to Gold Saint of Aries, future Pope of Sanctuary.
- Libra Dohko: A former Bronze Saint promoted to Gold Saint of Libra, future master of Dragon Shiryū.
- Crateris Suikyō: Formerly the Crateris Silver Saint, master of Tenma and a well-respected soldier of Athena's army. Unknown events have led him to switch his loyalty to Hades, forsaking his destiny as a Saint and embracing a new one as the Garuda Specter in Hades' army. He also trained with Shion and Dohko during their childhood.
- Andromeda Shun: A Bronze Saint and younger brother of Ikki. He travels back to the past with Saori and is later separated from her in the 18th century. In the same way as Alone was in the 18th century, Shun is the human with the purest soul in the present.
- Phoenix Ikki: A Bronze Saint and older brother of Shun. He reappears fighting off Lascoumoune before leaving and travelling to the past.
- Dragon Shiryū: A Bronze Saint. He goes back in time, to the time of the previous Holy War against Hades in the 18th century, to help Saori / Athena to save the life of Seiya from Hades's sword curse.
- Cygnus Hyōga: A Bronze Saint. He goes back in time with Shiryū, at the time of the holy war against Hades in the 18th century, to help Athena.
- Saori Kido: She is the current incarnation of Athena, Greek Goddess of Justice, Wisdom and Heroic Endeavor. She, along with Shun, travels back to the holy war against Hades in the 18th century to revert Hades's sword on Seiya, but was turned into an infant by Chronos, the God of Time.
- Ophiuchus Odysseus: Originally a Silver Saint, endowed with miraculous healing abilities, he was beloved and well respected in Sanctuary, where his tragic passing was heavily mourned in the 18th century. Years later, he is resurrected as the legendary Ophiuchus Gold Saint, who was cursed and sealed away in the ages of myth.
- Tōma: Formerly an Angel, a combatant of the Heavenly Realm, imprisoned in the Lunar Prison due to sins of his past. His status as an Angel is restored by Callisto, who sends him to take Athena's life, as well as Seiya's. His past is mysteriously connected to Eagle Marin.
- Pegasus Seiya: A Bronze Saint and the main protagonist of Saint Seiya. After the Holy War against Hades, he remains between life and death by Hades's sword curse. For that reason, Athena and his Bronze Saint friends embark on a journey back in time to save him.

== Production ==
Masami Kurumada first announced the start of the follow-up to Saint Seiya series in 2006. On April 21 he posted an image of Hades, Lord of the Underworld, on his blog. Short chapters came to be published once or even twice per month due to its sporadic release until January 4, 2007, when the next chapter did not get released until August 2 of that same year. The series had sporadic releases, with brief intervals of week-to-week publication, but Kurumada updated his blog after a longer interval to show the next upcoming chapters. In the second volume, in his personal message, Kurumada apologized for the delay of the volume, revealing that he was sick for a long time in the spring of 2009.

Saint Seiya: Next Dimension was conceived by Kurumada as a prequel to his Saint Seiya manga, parting from elements revealed in it but never further developed and explored then, hence, he started writing and drawing Next Dimension by opening the storyline in a prologue, with a flashback to the last battle of his original manga, contained in the 28th volume. Additionally, the original concept of the prequel was to work simultaneously with Shiori Teshirogi's Saint Seiya: The Lost Canvas as a multi-angle interpretation of the storyline, but this approach was quickly abandoned, as both works greatly diverged. In the first tankōbon volume, Next Dimension was confirmed to be canonical within the universe and chronology conceived by Kurumada for Saint Seiya.

Each chapter is presented in full colour. The first chapter was initially called "Prologue ①", however, the "①" was removed in the collected first volume. During the first fourteen chapters, the borderline of the pages was coloured to look like a starlit night sky; this was changed to standard white from chapter 14 onwards and in the compiled volumes.

== Publication ==
Written and illustrated by Masami Kurumada, Saint Seiya: Next Dimension debuted with a prologue chapter in Akita Shoten's shōnen manga magazine Weekly Shōnen Champion on April 27, 2006, and the serialization started on August 3 of that same year. The manga went on hiatus in several instances during its publication. A special chapter was published on June 19, 2014, and a second one on July 16, 2015. The series finished after 18 years of intermittent publication on July 4, 2024. Akita Shoten collected its chapters in 16 tankōbon volumes, released from February 6, 2009, to November 8, 2024.

An eight-page, full color epilogue, titled Saint Seiya Then: Haikyo no Hana (聖闘士星矢 THEN 廃墟の花; 'Saint Seiya Then: Flowers of Ruins'), was published in the same magazine on November 14, 2024. A second installment, "Saint Seiya Then II: Shimei" (聖闘士星矢 THEN II 使命; 'Saint Seiya Then II: Mission'), was published on December 19, 2025. A third installment, Saint Seiya Then III: Ketsui (聖闘士星矢 THEN III 決意; 'Saint Seiya Then III: Resolution'), was published on March 12, 2026. A fourth installment, Saint Seiya: Heaven Chapter – Then IV (聖闘士星矢 天界篇 THEN IV), is set to be published on December 18, 2026.

A sequel to Next Dimension, titled Saint Seiya: Heaven Chapter (聖闘士星矢(セイントセイヤ) 天界篇, Seinto Seiya Tenkai-hen), started in Weekly Shōnen Champion on May 14, 2026.

=== Volumes ===
No.	Japanese release date	Japanese ISBN
1	February 6, 2009	978-4-253-13271-8
Prologue; Part 1. "Dohko and Shion" (童虎とシオン, Dōko to Shion); Part 2. "Alone" (アローン, Arōn); Part 3. "Tenma" (天馬, Tenma); Part 4. "Friend" (友, Tomo); Part 5. "The Sword of Hades" (冥王の剣, Meiō no Ken); Part 6. "Hades' Awakening" (冥王覚醒, Meiō Kakusei); Part 7. "Hades Castle" (ハーデス城, Hādesu-jō); Part 8. "Specters" (冥闘士, Supekutā); Part 9. "Barrier" (結界, Kekkai); Part 10. "Suikyō" (水鏡, Suikyō); Part 11. "Warmth" (ぬくもり, Nukumori); Part 12. "The Water of Crateris" (杯座の水, Kuraterisu no Mizu)
In 1990, the Bronze Saints of Athena with their God Cloths engage the god Hades in the final battle to save their goddess Athena and the world. During the fight, the God of the Underworld remembers encountering Pegasus Seiya before, and the reader is then taken to the past. In the 18th century, Dohko and Shion are promoted from Bronze to Gold Saints by the Pope of Athena's Sanctuary. With their new status, they set out to take down Hades before he manifests in his chosen vessel of the era, Alone. Tenma, the Pegasus Bronze Saint in the 18th century steps in between and stops their attack. During the confusion Alone winds up in an old temple were Pandora manages to awake Hades' soul in Alone. With a barrier now in place that reduces the Saints' strength, Dohko, Shion and Tenma retreat with dismay. Yet before they can they are attacked by Griffon Vermeer and Garuda Suikyō, the latter being Tenma's former master. the Saints are hurt badly as the Specters are called back to Hades, but with the help of Tenma's horse they are able to escape and head back to Sanctuary, to recover and devise a strategy for the upcoming Holy War.
2	March 8, 2010	978-4-253-13272-5
Part 13. "Izō and Ox" (以蔵とオックス, Izō to Okkusu); Part 14. "Garland" (花の鎖, Hana no Kusari); Part 15. "The Temple of the Moon" (月の神殿, Tsuki no Shinden); Part 16. "As Long as There Is love" (愛あるかぎり, Ai Aru Kagiri); Part 17. "Lascoumoune" (ラスクムーン, Rasukumūn); Part 18. "The Immortal Bird" (不死鳥, Fushichō); Part 19. "The Doors of Spacetime" (時空の扉, Jikū no Tobira)
Tenma, Shion and Dohko return to Sanctuary to report their findings about the situation, only to be greeted harshly by the Taurus Gold Saint, Ox, enraged by their seemingly irresponsible behavior. After Taurus is restrained by Capricorn Izō, the Saints are puzzled by the absence of their goddess and ponder about her whereabouts. The Virgo Gold Saint, Shijima, then unveils that Athena may come from the future. 243 years later, in 1990, Athena travels with Andromeda Shun to Mount Olympus and meets her elder sister Moon Goddess Artemis, seeking help to relieve Seiya from the comatose state he was put in after by Hades' sword curse. Artemis reveals that the only way to do so is to travel back in time, Athena seeks then the help of the God of Time, Chronos. During the trek to Chronos, Shun and Athena are separated, the Bronze Saint is engaged by the guardians of Artemis, the Satellites, sent by Callisto to kill Athena. Shun is helped by his older brother Phoenix Ikki to defeat them and their commander Lascoumoune. Eventually, Athena meets Chronos, who sends her along with Shun back in time, to the Holy War in the 18th century, fulfilling Shijima's prediction.
3	December 8, 2010	978-4-253-13273-2
Part 20: "Athena's Birth" (女神降誕, Atena Kōtan); Part 21: "The Pope's Dagger" (教皇の短剣, Kyōkō no Tanken); Part 22: "To Athena's Side" (女神のもとへ, Atena no Moto e); Part 23: "The Enemy is Inside the Sanctuary" (敵は聖域にあり, Teki wa Sankuchuari ni Ari); Part 24: "Crystal Wall" (クリスタルウォール, Kurisutaru Wōru); Part 25: "Tears of Blood" (血涙, Ketsurui); Part 26: "The guidance of Athena" (女神の道標, Atena no Dōhyō)
In 1990, Phoenix Ikki finds Athena's garland, a lead to her whereabouts, and travels back in time. 243 years earlier, in the 18th century, the situation of the Holy War becomes only direr as Athena reincarnates as an infant. The Pope tries to murder her, but is thwarted by Virgo Shijima. Shijima is gravely wounded by Pisces Cardinale, who has sworn fealty to Hades, and flees to protect Athena. The Underworld Commander Garuda Suikyō is dispatched to Sanctuary to take the Athena's life. Followed by a cadre of Specters, Suikyō reaches the Sanctuary and engages Aries Shion in battle. Arriving from the future, Ikki meets an overpowered Shion and engages Suikyō in battle.
4	December 8, 2011	978-4-253-13274-9
Part 27: "Deadly combat in the Temple of the White Ram" (白羊宮の死闘, Hakuyōkyū no Shitō); Part 28: "Suishō" (水清, Suishō); Part 29: "Ice Spears" (氷槍, Hisō); Part 30: "One-winged Fallen Angel" (片翼の堕天使, Katayoku no Datenshi); Part 31: "Gemini's Labyrinth" (双児宮の迷宮, Jemini no Meikyū); Part 32: "Premonition to a Deadly Battle" (死闘への予感, Shitō e no Yokan); Part 33: "Deadly Battle in the Temple of the Twins" (双児宮の死闘, Jemini no Shitō)
In 1747, Sanctuary trembles as the war rages on and warriors of both armies engage in deadly combat. Sparing Shion and Ikki over suffering the effects of the latter's attack, Garuda Suikyō reaches the Taurus Temple, defeating its guardian, Ox. Simultaneously, Tenma and Shun venture into the Gemini Temple, where a deadly encounter between Gemini Abel, Cain and Suikyō takes place. As they rush to their encounter with Athena, Tenma and Shun almost reach the Cancer Temple. 243 years later, in 1990, the fallen Angel Tōma invades Sanctuary to slay Seiya, but fails due to the intervention of Cygnus Hyōga and Eagle Marin. Tōma senses a mutual but unclear connection to Marin as he retreats.
5	April 6, 2012	978-4-253-13275-6
Part 34: "Gemini Abel" (双子座のアベル, Jemini no Aberu); Part 35: "Cain & Abel" (光と影, Kain to Aberu); Part 36: "Deathtoll, the Coffin Maker" (棺桶屋のデストール, Kan'okeya no Desutōru); Part 37: "Omertà" (沈黙の棺, Omeruta); Part 38: "The Sacrifice of the Demon Emperor's Fist" (魔皇拳の生贄, Maōken no Ikenie); Part 39: "The Warmth of That Day" (あの日のぬくもり, Ano Hi no Nukumori); Part 40: "Advancing" (歩み, Ayumi)
In the 18th Century, Tenma and Shun continue their traversing of Sanctuary, managing to trespass the Gemini Temple and make it as far as to the Cancer Temple. The Specter Garuda Suikyō, seems to be under the effects of the Demon Emperor's Delusion Fist, also proceeds. Tenma and Shun, then Suikyō fight against the Cancer Gold Saint, the ambivalent Deathtoll, the coffin maker. Beyond the deathly portal of Praesepe, Tenma manages to defeat Deathtoll by sealing him in the coffin Omertà, saving his life as well as Shun's and his mentor's. Surviving the battle, Suikyō returns to Sanctuary, encouraging his apprentice to battle on, and resuming his way, heads to the next Temple.
6	December 12, 2012	978-4-253-13276-3
Part 41: "Until that Day" (いつかの日のために..., Itsuka no Hi no Tame ni...); Part 42: "Resuscitation" (起死回星, Kishi Kaisei); Part 43: "Leo Kaiser" (獅子座のカイザー, Reo no Kaizā); Part 44: "Fist of Light" (光の拳, Hikari no Ken); Part 45: "The Mischief of the Gods" (神の悪戯, Kami no Itazura); Part 46: "The Labyrinth of the Gods" (神々の迷宮, Kamigami no Rabirinsu); Part 47: "The Compassion of the Warrior" (戦士の情け, Senshi no Nasake)
In the 18th Century, the young Bronze Saints recover from their battle against Deathtoll and proceed to the following Temple, where they find Tenma's mentor Suikyō utterly defeated by its fierce guardian, Leo Kaiser and his pet Goldie. Meanwhile, in the Temple of the Twins a fierce battle between Gemini Cain and Phoenix Ikki ensues, until the young Bronze Saint proves to Cain their goals and allegiance are the same. Shun and Tenma also endure a hard trial to prove their loyalty to Athena to Leo Kaiser, and Deathtoll returns from Praesepe, revealing his true allegiance. As the battle for Earth continues Gemini Cain and Gemini Abel prepare to reveal the mystery of their birth.
7	August 8, 2013	978-4-253-13277-0
Part 48: "Burning Friendship" (炎の友情, Honō no Yūjō); Part 49: "The Gate of Death" (死門, Shimon); Part 50: "The Great Light" (大いなる光, Ōi Naru Hikari); Part 51: "Dragon and Swan" (龍と白鳥, Ryū to Hakuchō); Part 52: "Dragon and Tiger, Mentor and Disciple" (龍虎師弟, Ryūko Shitei); Part 53: "Successor" (継ぐ者, Tsugu Mono); Part 54: "Demonic Temple" (魔宮, Makyū)
In the 20th century, after stopping Angel Tōma from killing Seiya, Cygnus Hyōga proceeds to rally Dragon Shiryū to rush to Athena's aid. The reluctant Shiryū's loyalty as a Saint is rekindled only after a brief encounter with the Angel. Both Saints proceed to Mount Olympus and reach Athena's garland, which sends them back in time. Ophiuchus Shaina is suddenly taken over by a mysterious entity, which Eagle Marin fears to be the thirteenth Gold Saint, cursed since the age of myths. 243 years earlier, in the 18th century, Suikyō is challenged by Virgo Shijima, and after breaking through his defenses is revitalized by his Crateris Cloth, then reveals to Athena the mystery of the cursed Ophiuchus Gold Saint; and Shiryū meets the younger self of his revered mentor, Libra Dohko.
8	December 6, 2013	978-4-253-13278-7
Part 55: "The Thirteenth Gold Saint" (十三番目の黄金聖闘士, Jū San Ban Me no Gōrudo); Part 56: "My Friend" (わが友, Waga Tomo); Part 57: "The Heavenly Ultimate Law" (天舞宝輪, Tenbu Hōrin); Part 58: "Om" (阿吽, Aun); Part 59: "Recklessness" (蛮勇, Ban'yū); Part 60: "Divine Cosmo" (神の小宇宙, Kami no Kosumo); Part 61: "Farewell Poem for a Friend" (友を送る詩, Tomo o Okuru Uta)
In 1747, the mystery of the origin of the cursed Ophiuchus Gold Saint is revealed by Virgo Shijima, although his identity remains unrevealed. Dragon Shiryū earns the trust of his mentor Libra Dohko after a harsh trial, and proceeds to the next temple after the arrival of Garuda Suikyō, who then engages the Libra Gold Saint in an emotional and desperate battle, while reminiscing about the days of their youth. As Andromeda Shun and Pegasus Tenma arrive to the Temple of the Maiden, they become witnesses of an unprecedented clash between two Virgo Gold Saints of different eras, as the soul of the deceased Virgo Shaka manifests to come to Shun's aid. As Shijima convalesces after his battle, he is shocked to learn of the existence of another goddess who comes to his encounter, and the battle between Dohko and Suikyō comes to a sorrowful but inevitable ending.
9	June 20, 2014	978-4-253-13279-4
Part 62: "The Banner of Rebellion" (叛旗, Hanki); Part 63: "Deadly Battle in Yomi" (黄泉の死闘, Yomi no Shitō); Part 64: "Shabadabadaa" (娑婆陀芭陀亜, Shabadabadaa); Part 65: "Funeral Procession" (葬列, Sōretsu); Part 66: "Cancer's Tragedy" (蟹座無残, Kyansā Muzan); Part 67: "Peach Bomber" (桃爆, Momobaku); Part 68: "Emissaries" (御使い, Mitsukai)
Suikyō has finally fallen, and Griffon Vermeer is sent to continue with the attack on Athena's Sanctuary. Cancer Deathtoll and Phoenix Ikki are able to defeat the Magnate of the Underworld, leaving Deathtoll in a special condition in the aftermath. Meanwhile, Libra Dohko became aware of Suikyō's true mission and decides to betray Athena and take her life. Snakes begin appearing all over Sanctuary, and one of them talks to Aries Shion, announcing the inexorable resurrection of the 13th Gold Saint, the legendary Ophiuchus Odysseus.
10	June 6, 2016	978-4-253-13280-0
Special Episode I: "The Vow of the Goddess" (女神の誓い, Megami no Chikai); Special Episode II: "The Expansion of Time-Space" (時空の間, Toki no Hazama); Part 69: "The Sign of Leo" (獅子座の証, Reo no Akashi); Part 70: "Samael's Venom" (サマエルの毒, Samaeru no Doku); Part 71: "Mystria" (ミストリア, Misutoria); Part 72: "Freezing vs. Freezing" (凍気対凍気, Tōki Tai Tōki); Part 73: "Successor to Aquarius" (水瓶座を継ぐ者, Akueriasu o Tsugu Mono); Part 74: "Shiver Before Destruction" (滅びへの予震, Horobi e no Yoshin)
Athena manifests herself again, this time, as a young girl and comes to Virgo Shijima's aid. With the help of the mythical thread of Ariadne, they both manage to find the exit of the Labyrinth of the gods, only for Athena to suffer the bite of a snake which inoculates her with the fabled venom of Samael. Meanwhile, Phoenix Ikki arrives to the Leo Temple and is subjected to a tortuous trial by Leo Kaiser to prove his loyalty to Athena. Time is precious as Samael's venom is about to reach Athena's heart. Arriving at the Aquarius Temple, Shijima entrusts the moribund child goddess to its guardian, Aquarius Mystria. Cygnus Hyōga arrives at his temple moments later, and engages Mystria in a duel of Saints of Ice for the life of Athena. After acknowledging Hyōga as a true Saint, Mystria sends him off with Athena, to take her to the only man who can heal her, Ophiuchus Odysseus, whose imminent resurrection causes Sanctuary to tremble.
11	September 7, 2017	978-4-253-13281-7
Part 75: "Shiryū's Vain Dream" (紫龍邯鄲の夢, Shiryū Kantan no Yume); Part 76:" Écarlate of the Heavenly Scorpion Temple" (天蠍宮のエカルラート, Tenkatsukyū no Ekarurāto); Part 77: "Golden Blood" (黄金の血, Gōruden Buraddo); Part 78:" The Dragon's Chosen One" (龍に選ばれし者, Ryū ni Erabareshi Mono); Part 79: "The Arrow of Sagittarius" (人馬宮の矢, Jinbakyū no Ya); Part 80: "Legend of the Centaur" (人馬伝説, Jinba Densetsu); Part 81: "The Arrow of the Goddess" (女神の矢, Megami no Ya)
Tremors and space-time distortions stem from Odysseus' resurrection. Shiryū is caught in a strange dream-like state, in which he experiences all stages of life having forgotten his destiny as a Saint. Later realizing it all to be an illusion, Shiryū frees himself and encounters Scorpio Écarlate, who engages him in deadly battle. Recognizing him as a true Saint after witnessing his determination, Écarlate reveals the motives of the Gold Saints' loyalty to Odysseus. Meanwhile, Athena is near death as Samael's venom weakens her heart even further. Hyōga finally comes to an encounter with the fierce Sagittarius Gestalt, who refuses to acknowledge Athena as the true goddess. In the 20th century, the distortions cause Eagle Marin to find the fabled arrow of the goddess, also causing Sagittarius Aiolos' testament to manifest itself in the past. Facing certain death at the hands of Gestalt, Athena uses the arrow of the goddess to prove her divinity. Moved by Aiolos' quality as a true Saint and by the moribund Athena's gesture, Gestalt finally acknowledges her and allows Hyōga take her to Odysseus, whose return is now all but inevitable.
12	May 8, 2018	978-4-253-13282-4
Part 82: "Hypnotherapy" (ヒュプノテラピア, Hyupunoterapia); Part 83: "The Time for Resurrection" (復活の刻, Fukkatsu no Toki); Part 84: "Odysseus' Resurrection" (オデッセウスの復活, Odesseusu no Fukkatsu); Part 85: "The Awakening Arts" (覚醒の法, Kakusei no Hō); Part 86: "The Agony of Bygone Days" (過去の痛み, Kako no Itami); Part 87: "Two Souls, One Body" (二心一体, Nishin Ittai); Part 88: "Under the Troubled Constellation" (悩める星座のもとに, Nayameru Hoshi no Moto ni)
The time of Odysseus' resurrection arrives while Sanctuary trembles in reaction to the fateful event. The fabled Temple of the Snake Charmer rises once again and the Ophiuchus Gold Cloth seeks its bearer, completing the resurrection of the feared Ophiuchus Gold Saint from the ages of myth. Once a revered figure among the Saints, Odysseus now seeks allies to his cause, the murder of their goddess Athena. Odysseus encounters Aries Shion and Taurus Ox, who refuse to betray Athena and join him. Meanwhile, the Bronze Saints from the future awaken as Odysseus' awakening arts effect on them differs due to their coming from a different time, and proceed to rally to Athena's side. Ophiuchus Odysseus continues his traversing through Sanctuary seeking recruits to his cause, having reached the Gemini Temple. Engaging Gemini Cain in fierce battle, Odysseus is able to cure Cain of his rare condition, and then overcome the Gemini Saint's fearsome strength and unyielding devotion to Athena. Afterward, the resurrected Ophiuchus Gold Saint continues his march through Sanctuary, determined to reach Athena to take her life.
13	June 8, 2021	978-4-253-13283-1
Part 89: "Rehabilitation from Darkness" (闇からの蘇生, Yami kara no Sosei); Part 90: "The Beautiful One" (美しき者, Utsukushiki Mono); Part 91: "Lionheart" (ライオン・ハート, Raion Hāto); Part 92: "The Corleone Fruit" (コルレオーネの実, Korureōne no Mi); Part 93: "Asclepios' Wand" (アスクレピオスの杖, Asukurepiosu no Jō); Part 94: "Silentness" (無為, Mui); Part 95: "After a Dream" (夢のあと, Yume no Ato)
Ophiuchus Odysseus reaches Cancer Deathtoll's and Leo Kaiser's temples, demanding their allegiance and reminiscing about his bonds to them. Rejected by his former apprentices, Odysseus once again subjects them to the effects of the awakening arts. Finally, Odysseus reaches the Temple of the Maiden, and is ensnared by Virgo Shijima's formidable defenses along Phoenix Ikki. Meanwhile, young Athena Saori nears death and is placed in a protective shell by Odysseus' servant, which slows down the venom from finally reaching her heart, and preserve her life until Odysseus can decide her fate. Determined to reach Athena to take her life, Odysseus manages to break free from Shijima's defenses and sends Ikki to meet the Pope of Sanctuary, as he entrusts him with a mission to help him accomplish his true goal.
14	April 7, 2023	978-4-253-13284-8
Part 96: "Chrysos' Sword" (クリューソスの剣, Kuryūsosu no Ken); Part 97: "The Pit of Tartarus" (タルタロスの井戸, Tarutarosu no Ido); Part 98: "Possession" (憑依, Hyōi); Part 99: "Sasha" (サーシャ, Sāsha); Part 100: "Under the Stars" (星の下に, Hoshi no Moto ni); Part 101: "The Entrusted One" (託された者, Takusareta Mono); Part 102: "The Dormant Princess" (眠り姫, Nemuri Hime)
Suikyo's cryptic motives for joining Hades' army are finally revealed to Ophiuchus Odysseus in the past. Odysseus reminisces about his fateful encounter with Asclepius years ago, who was determined to possess his body to escape the Tartarus pit. Reaching the Libra Temple, Odysseus finds the lifeless body of his former comrade, Suikyō, and looks into the heart of an unconscious Tenma, leading him to wonder Suikyō's motives to entrust Athena and the Pegasus and Crateris Cloths to Tenma, whom Odysseus deems unworthy of being a Saint. Later engaging Tenma in battle, Odysseus witnesses the young Saint becoming one with his Cloth, as he fights to protect his friend Sasha, Athena's incarnation in that era. Realizing that Athena and Sasha are one and the same, and concluding the presence of two Athenas in the same era is the cause of the universal distortions, Odysseus dispatches Tenma to Sasha's side, as he also realizes Hades' army has already discovered Sasha's true nature and will not rest until she is assassinated.
15	May 8, 2024	978-4-253-13285-5
Part 103: "Protect Athena" (アテナを守れ, Atena o Mamore); Part 104: "To Sahā" (娑婆へ, Shaba e); Part 105: "The Bond of Flowers" (花の絆, Hana no Kizuna); Part 106: "The Voice of the Heart" (心の声, Kokoro no Koe); Part 107: "Scorpio's Annihilation" (蠍座の消滅, Sukōpion no Shōmetsu); Part 108: "From Beyond the Flames" (炎の彼方から, Honō no Kanata kara); Part 109: "The Godkiller Blade" (神殺しの刃, Kamigoroshi no Yaiba); Part 110: "Golden Gathering" (黄金の集結, Gōrudo no Shūketsu)
Ophiuchus Asclepius finally takes possession of Odysseus' body. Athena's heart is barely kept beating within the healing shell, while the Bronze Saints await Odysseus' arrival.
16	November 8, 2024	978-4-253-13286-2
Part 111: "Loose! Athena's Arrow" (放て! 女神の矢, Hanate! Atena no Ya); Part 112: "The Burning Emblem" (燃える紋章, Moeru Enburemu); Part 113: "Ecdysis" (脱皮, Dappi); Part 114: "The Sword of the King of the Darkness" (冥王の剣, Meiō no Ken); Part 115: "Athena's Death" (アテナの死, Atena no Shi); Part 116: "The Guiding Garlands" (花の標, Hana no Shirube); Part 117: "Apollon, the God of the Sun" (太陽神アポロン, Taiyōshin Aporon); Part 118: "Final Chapter: Winds Towards Tomorrow" (最終回 未来への風, Saishū Kai Ashita e no Kaze)

== Reception ==
The individual volumes of Saint Seiya: Next Dimension have ranked as the best-selling manga volumes on Japan's Oricon weekly chart. (Note: Ranking of each volume: Volume 1 (2009): 22nd place (30,618 copies sold); Volume 2 (2010): 9th place (47,896 copies sold); Volume 3 (2010): 17th place (44,200 copies sold); Volume 4 (2011): 17th place (43,804 copies sold); Volume 5 (2012): 23rd place (31,884 copies sold); Volume 6 (2012): 31st place (34,829 copies sold); Volume 7 (2013): 33rd place (40,775 copies sold); Volume 8 (2013): 28th place (35,541 copies sold); Volume 9 (2014): 28th place (39,034 copies sold); Volume 10 (2016): 19th place (46,729 copies sold); Volume 11 (2017): 23rd place (37,635 copies sold); Volume 12 (2018): 10th place (46,649 copies sold); Volume 13 (2021): 20th place (37,482 copies sold); Volume 15 (2024): 15th place (21,494 copies sold))
