= List of Saint Seiya: The Lost Canvas characters =

This article comprises a list of characters of the manga Saint Seiya: The Lost Canvas – The Myth of Hades by Shiori Teshirogi. The names of Athena's Saints include their constellations, and Hades' Specters include their destiny stars, being in both cases the last one their real names. Some of the characters appear only in this derivative work and not in Masami Kurumada's original manga and as such are considered non-canonical.

== Protagonists ==
=== Pegasus Tenma ===
Crane Yuzuriha, Unicorn Yato and Pegasus Tenma

Birthdate: December 15
Age: 15
Height: 168cm
Weight: 56kg
Blood type: B
Voiced by: Tetsuya Kakihara (Japanese); Arnie Pantoja (English)
Techniques:

Pegasus Meteor Fist (天馬(ペガサス)流星拳 Pegasasu Ryūsei Ken)
Pegasus Comet Fist (天馬(ペガサス)彗星拳 Pegasasu Suisei Ken)
Comet Fist: Big Bang (彗星拳・奇蹟(ビッグバン) Suisei Ken: Biggu Ban)

Pegasus Tenma (天馬星座(ペガサス)のテンマ, Pegasasu no Tenma) is the Pegasus Bronze Saint in Lost Canvas. He's the main protagonist of the series, an Italian orphan of Japanese ancestry, later revealed to be son of Mephistopheles Yōma. His soul reincarnates every time Athena returns to Earth, since the mythical ages of Greece, as the destiny of the Pegasus Saint is to forever be at his goddess' side, since he wields the strength to murder gods. His shown fighting techniques are Pegasus Meteor Fist (ペガサス流星拳, Pegasasu Ryūseiken)—a shower of punches at supersonic-speeds. He can also concentrate the diffuse strength of the punches into one concentrated blow called Pegasus Comet Fist (ペガサス彗星拳, Pegasasu Suiseiken). In his fight against Virgo Asmita Tenma briefly awakens the Seventh Sense, allowing him to fight on the same level as the Gold Saints. After returning from the Underworld, his Pegasus Cloth is repaired with the blood of Virgo Asmita, turning it into an identical version to the one that Pegasus Seiya wore during the Hades Arc from Kurumada's original manga and anime series. He ran through the Demonic Temples of the Lost Canvas, in order to get to Alone. Having reached the Saturnus Temple, Tenma is engaged in battle by his mother Partita, who is revealed to be a Specter of Hades' army. Tenma engages his mother in battle, and pushed by her to the limit, Tenma's Cosmo awakens to the Seventh Sense, causing the Pegasus Cloth to turn golden hued, due to Virgo Asmita's blood, and acquires a new appearance. Despite this, the Pegasus Cloth is completely shattered by Owl Partita, and she extracts Tenma's soul, which resembles Pegasus in appearance. Both struggle for possession of the soul, Tenma managing to retrieve it pulling from one of its wings, reintegrating the soul to his body, at the cost of a grave wound. A spiritual feather falls off the wing, touching the blood-smeared shards of the Pegasus Cloth, causing the resurrection of the Pegasus God Cloth, which envelops Tenma's body. He engages his mother in a final effort, and she is promptly defeated. Before she dies, Tenma and Partita reminisce about their pasts. Tenma recuperates and after Pandora reveals Alone is alive, he parts to encounter him. During the trek to Alone, Tenma re-encounters his father Yōma, but their meeting is cut short by the return of Gemini Aspros, who finally defeats the Specter. After this event, Tenma encounters Alone and Athena, ready to engage his friend of the past in a final duel. Both battle each other fiercely, and reminisce about their past and their connection since the ages of myth.

After a long battle, Tenma succeeds in forcing Alone to come back to his senses, although seemingly the power of Hades still lies within him. After Hades is expelled from Alone's body, Tenma, along with his friend and Athena, pursue the soul of the deity, and manage to banish it from the earthly plane with a combined effort imbued with the Cosmo of all three. As Dohko reveals in the final chapter, Tenma's life was forfeit in the final effort to defeat Hades.

=== Alone ===
Alone and Tenma

Birthdate: December 24
Age: 15
Height: 167cm
Weight: 54kg
Blood type: O
Voiced by: Hiro Shimono (Japanese); Daman Mills (English)

Alone (アローン, Arōn) is a young painter whose body is chosen as the vessel for Hades (冥王ハーデス, Meiō Hādesu), the god of the Underworld and Athena's eternal nemesis. He is an Italian orphan raised alongside Sasha and Tenma, who later become arch-enemies. Alone believes that everybody has a good side and disapproves the use of violence. At first he rejects his fate as the god of the Underworld, but is later convinced by Hypnos, and sealed by Pandora's kiss. Before Tenma leaves for the Sanctuary, they make a promise that, while Tenma tries to become a Saint of Athena, Alone too must try to become a good artist so that he can finish the painting of Tenma when they once again reunite. During the next two years, his personality undergoes a drastic change after realizing everything he painted dies. Convinced by Hypnos, he starts to believe that death is the ultimate salvation. And to bring salvation to the entire world, Alone starts to paint the "Lost Canvas", a painting of the Earth viewed from space, so that after he finishes it, the entire world will die. It has been implied that Alone is not yet totally possessed by Hades as Alone drew in the Lost Canvas an image of Tenma, Sasha and himself in their childhood. After seeing this, Pandora uses a seal given by Hypnos and Thanatos to seal him in a dimensional isolation, in hope that he will continue painting the Lost Canvas without distractions, and to keep him away from the grasp of anyone from his childhood life. Alone confesses to Pandora that he was never possessed by Hades and that he truly believes in death as the ultimate salvation, hence he inflicts it on those he holds dear, to spare them the suffering of pain, wars and poverty, and to achieve such goals, he will use all the power of the god of the Underworld. Alone states that once the Stellar Clock (星時計, Hoshidokei), which is visible in the nightsky, completes one cycle, the Lost Canvas will be finished, bringing death to the entire world. As the Holy War nears its climax, Alone encounters Tenma face to face, and after a bloody battle, Alone regains his former self, and feeling uneasy, begs Tenma to destroy his body to prevent the calamity that nears. As Tenma is unable to oblige, Alone is overwhelmed by the will of the god Hades, who takes completely over his body, and manifests himself wholly. Alone's features and hair transform to match those of Hades' true body, which rests in Elysion since the ages of myth, and the power of the god of the Underworld finally reveals itself in all its splendor. Hades is forced to retreat and abandons Alone's body, and flees, later encountering Tenma, Alone and Athena, who manage to banish him from the earthly plane with a combined effort.

Additionally, only in the Lost Canvas anime adaptation, the chosen vessel of Hades in the 15th century appears briefly, in the form of a young, red-haired man, who wears the same attire the possessed Andromeda Shun wore in the 20th century.

=== Sasha ===
Sasha and Tenma.

Birthdate: March 8
Age: 14
Height: 159cm
Weight: 47kg
Blood type: A
Voiced by: Aya Hirano (Japanese); Reba Buhr (English)

Sasha (サーシャ, Sāsha) is the incarnation in the 18th century of Athena (女神(アテナ), Atena), the goddess of war, justice and heroic endeavor, who always reappears when evil consumes Earth. She spent her childhood with Alone and Tenma in a small village in Italy and is later "adopted" by the Sanctuary in Greece. Before leaving for the Sanctuary, she gives Alone and Tenma bracelets made from flowers as a charm that will hopefully reunite them one day. In the Sanctuary, she meets Tenma again as a Saint and later encounters her brother Alone as an enemy. Although being in different positions, Sasha wishes to live with Tenma and Alone again, remembering their promise. Also, occasionally during the course of the Lost Canvas manga, the incarnation of Athena in the 15th century appears briefly partaking in events in that era that affected the following holy war, Teshirogi referring to her as The previous Athena (先代アテナ, Sendai Atena), who sealed the twin gods in that era. This previous incarnation of Athena is featured more prominently in the anime adaptation.

After the death of many of her Saints and her discovery that Alone could bring his Specters back to life, Sasha raises a barrier with her Cosmo covering all Sanctuary to prevent the Specters in the area from being revived. However, as long as the barrier remains active, her Cosmo will be drained, weakening her. During the invasion of the Sanctuary by Alone and his Specters, Sasha and the Pope attempted to seal him after seeing Alone trying to kill Tenma, but he manages to escape. Once Hades is expelled from Alone's body, Athena joins Tenma and Alone in concentrating their Cosmo in the garland all three wear, and banish Hades' soul from the earthly plane. Athena's divine power were sealed by the intervention of Acheron Charon. Seeking Hades, she aims to trespass the Demon Temples, guarded by Tenma, Shion and Regulus. Athena then encounters Pandora and her guardians, and realizing the moment of the final battle is near, resurrects the legendary Cloth of Athena (女神(アテナ)の聖衣(クロス), Atena no Kurosu), and dons it, to everyone's amazement. Afterward, Athena succumbs to the weight of the Cloth, as she is unable to tap into her Cosmo to power and operate it in unison, due to Acheron Charon's seal, and is left at Pandora's mercy. Overpowered by her, Athena reminisces about their childhood, and manages to awake her Cosmo partially. After Rhadamanthys destroyed the painting which sealed her powers, she recovered her divine condition, restored the petrified Saints aboard the Ship of Hope, and parted to engage Alone once and for all. After their encounter, Athena witnesses Tenma and Alone's duel to the death. Once Hades' soul is expelled from Alone body and flees, Athena joins Tenma and Alone in the pursuit of the deity's soul and confront him. Athena then imbues the garland in her wrist, along with Alone's and Tenma's, with her divine Cosmo, managing to banish Hades from the earthly plane. It is implied her soul returns to Olympus, to reincarnate in the future.

Additionally, Saori Kido (城戸 紗織, Kido Saori), the incarnation of Athena in the 20th century in Saint Seiya original manga, appears briefly in the epilogue of The Lost Canvas, contained in vol. 25.

== Athena's Army ==
The Athena's Saints are the soldiers of Athena's army, who always return when she reincarnates, known as the bringers of hope and destroyers of evil. They are divided in ranks: Bronze, Silver and Gold according to their mastery of Cosmo. The Bronze Saints are the lowest rank of Athena's army, still initiates in the mysteries of Cosmo and work mostly as backup for the Silver Saints on their missions. The Silver Saints are middle rank soldiers, possessing advanced mastery of Cosmo and are the eyes and ears of the Sanctuary. Superiors to Bronze Saints, wielding tremendous physical strength and capable of moving at speeds that reach mach 2 to 5. They share with the Gold Saints the responsibility of training new Saints and undertake all kind of missions. The Gold Saints are the twelve most powerful Saints of Athena. Every one of them has awakened their 7th sense, which allows them to attain the speed of light. Each Gold Saint is also assigned to a temple named after their corresponding zodiac signs to protect the Sanctuary. All Gold Saints seem to be similar physically and psychologically to those who appeared in the Modern Era, with the difference of Shion as the Aries Gold Saint. Shiori Teshirogi mentions that drawing the Gold Saints is one of her favorite parts in the manga as they are her favorite characters of the series.

=== Bronze Saints ===
There were several unnamed Bronze and Silver Saints during the Lost Canvas arc. Firstly there were seven Saints slaughtered together with the Heracles Saint by Minos. Three other Bronze Saints appeared, subordinates to Capricorn El Cid, which were killed by Oneiros. Five more appeared around other well known Silver Saints below Hades Castle in Italy. Two were accompanying the Perseus Saint at Canon Island. Five were killed at the entrance to the Lost Canvas by Sphynx Pharaoh and another 21 Saints were petrified together with Yato and Yuzuriha aboard the Ship of Hope which went to the Lost Canvas. There was also a brief appearance of the Chamaeleon Saint, although no name was revealed and she wasn't seen in any battle later. Additionally, the Pegasus Saint of the ages of myth (神話の時代の天馬星座の聖闘士, Shinwa no jidai no Pegasasu no Seinto), appears in several explanatory panels.

==== Unicorn Yato ====
Voiced by: Atsushi Abe (Japanese); Kyle McCarley (English)

Unicorn Gallop 獨角獸飛奔(ユニコーン・ギャロップ) Yunikōn Gyaroppu)

Unicorn Yato (一角獣星座(ユニコーン)の耶人, Yunikōn no Yato) is the name of the Unicorn Saint living in the 18th Century. He was partner of Pegasus Tenma in the Sanctuary and he did not get along well with him. During the first mission in the manga he was attacked by Alone-Hades and he was thought to be dead by the other Saints. Yet, he somehow survived and stumbled upon a dying Tenma. During his attempt to carry him away, a Lemurian young woman called Yuzuriha appeared before them. Yato attacked her, mistaking her as an enemy. But after a conversation, he finds out that she is on the same side. Yuzuriha then took both of them to Jamir, in Tibet, via teleportation. There, the Lemurian Master Hakurei repaired Yato's Cloth with Yuzuriha's blood. After its repair, his Cloth bears some resemblance to the one Pegasus Seiya wore in the Poseidon arc in the original manga. Yato claims that although he is not as strong or important as his partners, he considers fighting alongside them an honor. His only known attack is the Unicorn Gallop (ユニコーンギャロップ, Yunikōn Gyaroppu) during which he performs a powerful kick. In the anime adaptation, Yato exhibited a new technique, Unicorn Jump (ユニコーンジャンプ, Yunikōn Janpu), with which he leaps high into the air, delivering a fast diving kick. Yato seems to have a crush on Sasha as he always gets angry when Tenma mentions her, but his actual feelings have not yet been revealed in the story. He also sometimes risks his life to help Tenma; at the beginning of the series, just to prevent Sasha from being sad, but as the series progresses, he does it as Tenma's friend. In recent events, he was the one who discovered the frozen Ship of Hope near the Tibetan area of Jamir. It is here when he reveals to have been a training partner and friend to Leo Regulus. After the Argos ship was released and the Orichalcum was installed in said ship, the Bronze Saints decided to let Yato to pilot the boat while Sisyphos and Tenma made the defense against the Specter leader Aiacos' ship. After entering the Lost Canvas, Yato and most of Athena's army were turned into stone. Some time later, Yato comes back to life by the intervention of Athena's divine Cosmo. After witnessing the final struggle against Hades and having survived the Holy War after the defeat of the god, Yato is deprived of the ability to use his Cosmo by Athena, so he can live as a normal human for the rest of his life.

==== Other Bronze Saints ====
- Lionet Blériot (子獅子星座 (ライオネット) のブレリオ, Raionetto no Burerio) is one of the carpenters chosen to fix the ancient boat.
- Hydra Curtiss (海ヘビ星座（ヒドラ）のカーチス, Hidora no Kāchisu) is one of the carpenters chosen to fix the ancient boat.
- Bear Douglas (大熊星座（ベアー）のダグラス, Beā no Dagurasu) is one of the carpenters chosen to fix the ancient boat.
- Wolf Junkers (狼星座（ウルフ）のユンカース, Urufu no Yunkāsu) is one of the carpenters chosen to fix the ancient boat. Junkers appears to be the chief of the Bronze Saints, showing remarkable leadership and confidence among them. Even Leo Regulus showed respect to him by listening to his orders. To prevent the attack of thousands of Specters against the boat, Junkers shout them to grab each other and elevate their Cosmo to create a barrier, which proved ineffective against Garuda Aiacos attack. Aiacos then, rides his boat direct through Athena's, with every soldier and Saint avoiding the attack, only Junkers managed to stay in front of the boat to protect it, showing his incredible courage even knowing that he would be crushed by the attack. At the end, he is saved by the appearance of Sagittarius Sisyphos. Junkers sacrifices his life by using the power of the Orichalcum to start the boat. He has become one with that boat and his sacrifice ignite that to finally ascend to sky, giving encouragement to Unicorn Yato in order to pilot and control the sacred ship.

=== Silver Saints ===
The Cerberus, Sagitta and Auriga Silver Saints died from the previous encounter with unknown Specters in Italy, along with Canis Major and Musca, but these three were later resurrected and turned evil by Hades, then killed by Aries Shion and Libra Dohko. In the anime adaptation, the Sagitta and Auriga Saints uttered the name of their attacks, being Phantom Arrow (ファントムアロー, Fantomu Arō) and Ripping Saucer (リッピングソーサー, Rippingu Sōsā) respectively. Two Silver Saints, Hound and Lizard, were sent to a new mission to Italy in order to investigate the unfolding of the events there with a group of Gold and Bronze Saints. The Heracles Saint was slain by Minos as he invaded the outer area of Sanctuary. Four more unidentified Silver Saints were found lying dead by Libra Dohko as he was on his way to aid the Taurus Saint in his fight against Bennu Kagaho. Cetus, Crow and Ophiuchus made their appearances as Alone presented the Lost Canvas to Sanctuary. The Cetus Saint of the 13th century appears briefly along Kōh-i-Nūr Krjest in the extra galleries included in the Anecdotes chapters. As the army of Sanctuary gathered below Hades Castle, many well-known Saints, among them Centaurus, Cepheus and Eagle, made a brief appearance. The Perseus Saint appeared on Canon Island, he was defeated by Gemini Defteros who regarded him as "too weak". And as Hakurei summoned the souls of the last holy war, the Lyra Saint from that era made a brief appearance.

Also, several unnamed Saints of unrevealed rank appear briefly only in the anime adaptation, forming part of Athena's army led by Sagittarius Sisyphos in the attack to Hades' castle. Only their constellations were revealed in the booklet included in the season 2 DVDs: Delphinus (いるか座, Iruka-za), Indus (インディアン座, Indian-za), Tucana (きょしちょう座, Kyoshichō-za), Corona Borealis (かんむり座, Kanmuri-za), Volans (とびうお座, Tobiuo-za), Eridanus (エリダヌス座, Eridanusu-za), Boötes (うしかい座, Ushikai-za), Lepus (うさぎ座, Usagi-za), Cassiopeia (カシオペア座, Kashiopea-za) and Camelopardalis (きりん座, Kirin-za).

Several of the Silver Saints also appear during their incarnations in the 15th century, some being featured in Teshirogi's manga and some in the Lost Canvas anime adaptation.

==== Altar Hakurei ====
Voiced by: Ken'yū Horiuchi (Japanese); Paul St. Peter (English)

Altar Hakurei (祭壇座(アルター)のハクレイ, Arutā no Hakurei) is a character introduced in Lost Canvas, the Elder of Jamir, Master of Shion, Yuzuriha, Tokusa and Atla, elder brother of Sage. He survived, with his brother, the previous Holy War. Hakurei was originally entrusted to occupy the Pope's seat, but gave it up to his brother instead and he moved in Jamir. He once prevented his apprentice Shion to defect Athena's ranks in favor of Hades. With the demise of his brother, he has taken over the Pope's position, faking that Sage is still alive so not to break the morale of the Saints. In order to break the seal that cut down the Saints' power to 10% by using the sword blessed by Athena in the previous Holy War, Hakurei decides to go to Hades' territory alone despite Shion's objection. Hakurei easily defeats the foot soldiers and upon entering the church of Hades, he is confronted by Hypnos, who brings forward the defeated disciples of Hakurei, Shion and Yuzuriha. Using the ultimate attack Praesepe Returning Spirits Wave (積尸気転霊波, Sekishiki Tenryōha) Hakurei summons the souls of the fallen Saints from the previous Holy War, among them Cancer Sage's soul. Hakurei uses their power to form a massive energy ball, which distracts the attention of Hypnos. While Hypnos is nullifying the energy ball, Hakurei unleashes his living soul to seal the defenseless Hypnos. However, before Hakurei can break the seal using the blessed sword, Hades appears out of thin air and kills him.

==== Crane Yuzuriha ====
Voiced by: Sanae Kobayashi (Japanese); Tara Sands (English)

Crane Yuzuriha (鶴座(クレイン)のユズリハ, Kurein no Yuzuriha) is the Crane Silver Saint. She is also the main character in the short story Yuzuriha Gaiden. Yuzuriha is a student of Hakurei, the Lemurian master, and former training partner of Aries Shion. She does not wear her Silver Cloth until reaching Sanctuary, and tends not to wear a mask like any other female Saint. As revealed in her short story, she was the elder sister of Heavenly Skillful Star, Hanuman Tokusa, a deceased Specter of Hades' Army. She first appears after the apparent death of Pegasus Tenma at the hands of Alone. She finds Tenma's dying body and Unicorn Yato who tried to attack her as he thought she was an enemy. However, Yuzuriha reasoned with him and took him and Tenma to Jamir. When they arrived, she offered her blood, allowing her master Hakurei to repair the Unicorn Cloth. Shortly thereafter, she is sent to the Underworld with Yato to rescue the soul of Tenma, which was trapped by one of Hades' specters. Like her master, Yuzuriha is able to use psychokinesis. She is also an experienced fighter, being one of the most powerful Silver Saints. In combat, she aids herself with her scarf-like garment. This is further displayed with Dazzling Dance of Beautiful Flashing Kicks (絢舞裳閃脚, Kenbu Shōsenkyaku), a combination of kicks with a hit of her scarf-like cloth, using her psychokinesis. The scarf can also gain heat by the use of her Cosmo. Further into the story, Yuzuriha becomes friend of Tenma and Yato. And like all other Saints, protecting Athena is her primary goal. She's been lately seen helping Leo Regulus after he was easily defeated by Garuda Aiacos' attack; and then going up to the heavens for the final battle at the Lost Canvas, aboard the Ship of Hope, where she is turned to stone. Some time later, Crane comes back to life by the intervention of Athena's divine Cosmo. After witnessing the final struggle against Hades and having survived the Holy War after the defeat of the god, Crane is deprived of the ability to use her Cosmo by Athena, so she can live as a normal human for the rest of her life.

==== Others Silver Saints ====
- Puppis Lacaille (船尾星座 (パピス) のラカーユ, Papisu no Rakāyu) he is one of the disciples of Capricorn El Cid.
- Vela Tsubaki (帆星座 (ヴェラ) のツバキ, Vera no Tsubaki) he is one of the disciples of Capricorn El Cid.
- Centaurus Fotia (ケンタウロス星座のフォティア, Kentaurosu no Fotia) he is one of the Silver Saints of the 16th century.
- Centaurus Yugo (ケンタウロス星座のユーゴ, Kentaurosu no Yūgo) he is one of the Silver Saints of the 16th century.
- Sagitta Arkon (矢座 (サジッタ) のアルコン, Sajitta no Arukon) he is one of the Silver Saints of the 16th century.
- Hound Renner (猟犬星座のレナー, Haundo no Renā) he is one of the disciples of Taurus Teneo.

=== Gold Saints ===
The Gold Saints in Lost Canvas, from left to right, top to bottom: Aries Shion, Gemini Aspros, Leo Regulus, Virgo Asmita, Cancer Manigoldo, Taurus Aldebaran, Libra Dohko, Sagittarius Sisyphos, Aquarius Dégel, Pisces Albafica, Capricorn El Cid, and Scorpio Kardia.

==== Aries Shion ====
Voiced by: Shin-ichiro Miki (Japanese); Max Mittelman (English)

Aries Shion (牡羊座(アリエス)のシオン, Ariesu no Shion) is the Aries Gold Saint in the 18th century. He is tranquil and analytical. He is a close friend of Libra Dohko to whom he is often seen talking. He is a descendant of the People from the Lost Continent and is a disciple of Altar Hakurei, and former training partner of Crane Yuzuriha. Previously a passionate student of the lives of Saints of the past through the analysis and repair of their Cloths. His shown techniques are Crystal Wall (クリスタルウォール, Kurisutaru Wōru), which creates a defensive barrier. In the original manga, Crystal Wall is used only in the form of a wall, but in Lost Canvas, it can take various shapes, depending on the user's will. When Crystal Wall was first used in Lost Canvas, Aries Shion has employed it in various forms. This defensive technique seems to be impregnable, with a few exceptions, as it was able to stop the most powerful attack of Griffon Minos. With his Stardust Revolution (スターダストレボリューション, Sutādasuto Reboryūshon), he creates a miniature universe, conjuring stardust from stars and galaxies, allowing him to throw innumerable blows instantly. According to the time line, he first appears in the Sanctuary returning from Jamir. He is also the one who kills Worm Raimi when the Specter infiltrated Sanctuary to attack Sasha. After delivering the killing blow on the Specter, he kneels before her, acknowledging her true identity. Two years later, Shion and Dohko are forced to kill three Silver Saints brought back to life by Hades. Feeling guilty, he intents to redeem himself by asking to be sent on a mission in Italy along with Libra Dohko. Later he appeared repairing the Saint's Cloths at Sanctuary, and then reuniting with Athena's army in heaven. Together with Sisyphos and Regulus he opened the gate to the Lost Canvas with Athena Exclamation. There he survived the voyage through the clouds which turned all non-Gold Saints (except Pegasus) into stone and defeated Acheron Charon shortly after. Recently he was shown arriving to the First Demon Temple: Mercury (第1魔宮水星, Dai ichi Makyū Mākyurī), along with Athena, Regulus and Tenma, which they passed through freely, arriving then to the Second Demon Temple: Venus (第2魔宮金星, Dai ni Makyū Vīnasu). Shion then meets the guardian of the Temple, Balron René, and challenges him. After a ferocious battle that made Shion confront his past sins and encounter the Saints of the past in the eternal torment of Cocytus, the Aries Gold Saint managed to use a technique that he learned empirically from his master, the Praesepe Returning Spirits Wave (積尸気転霊波, Sekishiki Tenryō-ha), thus obliterating René. The Specter then realized that Shion was able to be the link between the past and future generation, as the future Pope of Sanctuary. Afterwards, Shion proceeded to rejoin his comrades. Finding Mephistopheles Yōma in his way to the last Demon Temple, he was almost killed by the Specter, only to be saved from the Marvelous Room by Gemini Aspros, who entrusted him to Tenma, while unconscious. Shion as well as his comrade Dohko, remain unconscious as Tenma finally reaches Alone. After awakening, Shion bears witness to the titanic struggle between Alone and Tenma, and after Hades manifests, takes part into the battle, revealing to Hades that he holds the key to his defeat: the power of the golden light of the zodiac. After Hades is forced to abandon Alone's body, the deity's soul flees and is pursued by Tenma and Alone. Before joining them, Shion is entrusted by Athena with the responsibility of rebuilding Sanctuary and raising the next generation of Saints, appointing him as the highest authority in Sanctuary, granting him the rank of Pope. Witnessing the final struggle against Hades and returning to Sanctuary, along with Dohko, Shion last appears fulfilling his duties as the maximum authority of Sanctuary, in the absence of Athena, vowing to rebuild Sanctuary.

==== Taurus Rasgado ====
Voiced by: Tomokazu Sugita (Japanese); Jamieson Price (English)

Taurus Aldebaran (牡牛座(タウラス)のアルデバラン, Taurasu no Arudebaran) is the Taurus Gold Saint in The Lost Canvas. The Taurus Gold Saints are named after the brightest star in the Taurus constellation, and Aldebaran's real name is Rasgado (ハスガード, Hasugādo). His nickname is also alternatively spelled, both in the manga and the animation with the forced reading Aldebaran (巨星(アルデバラン), Arudebaran), with the kanji meaning Giant Star. He is a noble master who treasures his friends and students. He is mentor to Teneo, Salo and Celintha, having once saved their lives, and was chosen by them as their teacher. Aldebaran is said to be the Gold Saint with the fastest attack. His skill with the Iai Position allows him to maintain his arms crossed during the attack. This also allows him to perform the Great Horn (グレートホーン, Gurēto Hōn), a fast technique in which he creates a big blast with his palms. One of his most powerful attacks is Titan's Nova (タイタンズノヴァ, Taitanzu Nova), a powerful technique that Aldebaran performs with only one arm, normally used on the ground to destroy all the area. The Iai Position is broken when Aldebaran performs it. In the Anecdotes complementary series, it is revealed that the technique has an even more powerful variant known as Titan's Break (タイタンズブレイク, Taitanzu Bureiku). In the series, it is also revealed that Aldebaran faced the threat of the dreaded monster Typhon, years before the Holy War of 1747. Aldebaran's wounds from his fight against Kagaho are torn open again during a fight, but he was able to kill Wimber after discovering that they wanted to kill Tenma. Then his heart is stopped by Dullahan Cube's Death Messenger. In that moment, he has a dream of Sisyphos telling him to win, reminding him how much it hurt Athena when one of her Saints died. Then, Aldebaran performs Titan's Nova, despite his stilled heart, and kills Cube. His dead body is then attacked by Frog Zelos but he is stopped and defeated by Bennu Kagaho. It is later revealed that it was Rasgado who summoned Leo Ilias back to Sanctuary, ten years before the events depicted in The Lost Canvas, helping him to protect a village from Specters, and engaging Harpy Valentine in combat.

He last appears in spiritual form during the attack of golden light unleashed by the Gold Saints on Hades.

==== Gemini Defteros ====
Gemini Defteros (双子座(ジェミニ)のデフテロス, Jemini no Defuterosu), also known as the "Demon of Canon Island" (カノン島の鬼, Kanon-tō no Oni) and addressed by Asmita's ghost as "a man who can destroy the stars of a galaxy", first reveals himself as a man of incredible savagery, although he is at heart a serene warrior. He lives by the philosophy of survival of the strongest. Twin brother of the late Gemini Aspros. Defteros' name, alternatively spelled as Gemini Defteros (双子座(ジェミニ)の二番目(デフテロス), Jemini no Defuterosu) with the meaning "Second one", reveals his condition as the younger of the twins. During his younger years, Defteros suffered the rejection of Sanctuary as a Saint apprentice. Forced to wear an iron mask to hide his existence from the outer world, Defteros was protected by his older brother Aspros, who was considered the rightful future heir of the Gemini Gold Cloth. In Canon Island, Defteros helps Tenma to reach briefly the 7th Sense and to understand how to combine the mastery of Cosmo in order to become one with nature as well. After training the young Saint, Defteros leaves telling an unconscious Tenma to take good care of the Pegasus Cloth, possibly out of respect for Asmita whose blood restored it. Later on, he is seen healing Libra Dohko's wound caused by Hades' sword by using Athena's blood. He then asks him to carry a vial of the same blood to Athena's statue in Sanctuary, and reveals to him his true identity as the Gemini Gold Saint. He reveals to Dohko that his life was saved by Bennu Kagaho, by bringing him to Canon Island. He enters the war against Hades in Sanctuary, surprising Bennu Kagaho to save Dohko's life by means of opening an alternate dimension with his Another Dimension (アナザーディメンション, Anazā Dimenshon) attack. He tells Kagaho to convey a message to Hades, that they're arriving to the Lost Canvas and that his defeat is near. He later removes the secret of Athena's Cloth from Dohko's memory and sends him with it to the Lost Canvas. Remaining within the vacuum of the Another Dimension, Defteros is challenged by his brother Aspros, who was revived by Hades in exchange of his loyalty and the secret of Athena's Cloth. Later, they resume their encounter in the 4th Demon Temple: Mars, which now resembles the Temple of the Twins in Sanctuary. Both warriors engage each other in battle while reminiscing about their past. It was revealed that Defteros was manipulated in order to assassinate the Pope by his older brother, Aspros, with the attack Demon Emperor's Delusional Fist, a technique that grants the user complete control the target until the victim has witness the death of someone. Defteros was able to fight off the effects of the technique with help of Virgo Asmita long enough to deliver a fatal blow to his brother, completely freeing himself. After his defeat, Aspros applies the Delusional Fist on himself before dying. Defteros took Aspros' body with him and the Gemini Gold Cloth to Canon Island. Returning to the battle at the Mars Temple, Defteros is put under the control of Aspros again. To counter the attack, Defteros exhibits a newly introduced technique, the Mavros Eruption Clast (マブロスエラプションクラスト, Maburosu Erapushon Kurasuto), (from the Ancient Greek μαύρος, "black") with which Defteros summons magma from the depths of earth to create a violent explosion. Defteros reveals to Aspros that he surpassed his own limits during his training at Canon Island and uses his technique to free himself again from his brother's control. Even so, Aspros counters the technique easily with his Galaxian Explosion, overpowering the Gemini Saint into submission. Putting aside fond memories and respect for the once-gentle brother he knew, Defteros engages Aspros in a final effort, pitting his own Galaxian Explosion against his brother's, out of which only one will come as survivor and final victor. Seizing the moment of the clash of the Explosions, Defteros hits his brother with a technique that sacrifices his own life, nullifying the effects of the Delusional Fist on Aspros, making him return to his senses. Afterward, Defteros' body vaporizes, leaving behind the Gemini Gold Cloth. Having sacrificed his life in order to restore his brother's sanity, Defteros remained content in merging his soul with his brother's.

==== Cancer Manigoldo ====
Voiced by: Daisuke Ono (Japanese); Keith Silverstein (English)

Cancer Manigoldo (蟹座(キャンサー)のマニゴルド, Kyansā no Manigorudo) is the Gold Saint of Cancer and disciple of the previous Cancer Gold Saint, Sage. He was shown as being somewhat hostile and talking in an informal, almost humorous way. Manigoldo is bold, aggressive, arrogant and very confident, he believed that the dead of all eras are nothing but refuse. When meeting Sage, he decides to train in the Sanctuary to understand the idea that "every person who is alive or dead is part of the universe." Manigoldo, whose name is alternatively spelled in kanji as 死刑執行人(マニゴルド) in his Anecdotes, with the kanji meaning "Executioner"(which is the etymology of the Italian word "Manigoldo"), was taught by Sage a large number of techniques related with souls. In direct relation to the oriental folklore pertaining the Cancer constellation, he has the ability to send souls to the entrance to the Underworld with his Praesepe Underworld Waves (積尸気冥界波, Sekishiki Meikai-ha), with Praesepe Demonic Blue Flames (積尸気鬼蒼焔, Sekishiki Kisōen) Manigoldo creates an orb in his hand, igniting every soul nearby, thus incinerating the souls of his opponents and with Praesepe Soul Burial Waves (積尸気魂葬波, Sekishiki Konsō-ha) Manigoldo uses stray souls nearby as gunpowder to create a great explosion. Apart from the attacks involving souls, Manigoldo can use a physical attack called Acubens (アクベンス, Akubensu) in which Manigoldo uses both his legs as pincers of a crab's claw to cut his opponent in half, hence the name. In the Anecdotes chapters, Acubens name is also alternatively spelled in kanji as Acubens (蟹爪(アクベンス), Akubensu), meaning "Crab pincers". During the series Manigoldo encounters Thanatos, a feat which proves too much and has him almost killed. With the aid of his master Sage, however, he proves to be a challenge for the god. In his last moments, Manigoldo launches a last-ditch attack against Thanatos' physical body, destroying it and in the aftermath being pulverized himself, giving Sage a chance to seal Thanatos away. After the death of Sage, the soul of Manigoldo appears in the Sanctuary and gives to Aries Shion the helmet of the Pope to give it to his teacher.

He last appears in spiritual form during the attack of golden light unleashed by the Gold Saints on Hades.

==== Leo Regulus ====
Leo Regulus (獅子座(レオ)のレグルス, Reo no Regurusu) is the Leo Gold Saint in Lost Canvas. He is the youngest of the Gold Saints and has been classified as a combat specialist. He appears to have a very close relationship to Unicorn Yato. He trained under his uncle Sagittarius Sisyphos and is considered a prodigy even amongst the Gold Saints, a formidable one-on-one combatant. Regulus used his technique to destroy the ice that surrounded the Ship of Hope, that will be used by Athena to reach the Lost Canvas. The attack was so quick, that the Bronze Saints couldn't see it when it was performed. He engages into a fight with Behemoth Violate, overcoming her tremendous strength two times, the first one when he concentrates his Cosmo in his finger tip, to stop the attack of the Specter. The second time, when he discovers the truth behind Violate's shadow technique, avoiding the attack of the dead, and making them attack her own controller. At the end of the fight, Leo simply fulminates Violate with his Lightning Plasma (ライトニングプラズマ, Raitoningu Purazuma), with it, Regulus launches multiple punches that travel at the speed of light, similar to Tenma's Pegasus Meteor Fist. If he is using the maximum power of his Cosmo, the technique allows Regulus to throw 100 billion punches per second at his opponents. From the view of his opponent, he would see himself trapped in a net formed by rays of light, which are the traces left by his fist. Additionally, in the Anecdotes chapters, Regulus appears during his younger years, and uses his Lightning Crown (獅子の大鎌(ライトニング・クラウン), Raitoningu Kuraun) technique, a powerful burst of pure Cosmo, to slay Banshee Shelley. After his battle with Violate he was struck by surprise by Aiacos and was retrieved by Yuzuriha. He has been seen reuniting with Athena's army in heaven and together with Sisyphos and Shion he opened the gate to the Lost Canvas with Athena Exclamation. There he survived the voyage through the clouds which turned all non-Gold Saints (except Pegasus) into stone and arrived at the Second Demon Temple, along Shion and Tenma, where he was ensnared by Balron René's whip, being freed thereafter by the Aries Saint, thus proceeding to the next Temple. He was shown arriving to the Saturnus Temple, preparing to engage in battle. Regulus attacks the Wyvern along with Tenma, only to have their attacks negated by the Specter. After the defeat of Partita, Regulus encounters Wyvern in the Saturnus Temple and after studying his physique and technique, Leo locks himself in combat against the Specter, vowing to surpass his power. Furious for revenge, Regulus reveals then to the Wyvern, that he is the son of Leo Ilias, the man who broke off his horn. Regulus reminisces about the quiet life he shared in the past with his father Ilias and engages the Specter without restrain. As Wyvern has attained divinity, Regulus is in clear disadvantage, expecting to revert the situation, he performs the devastating Athena Exclamation unassisted, which he learned from his mentor Sisyphos. The Wyvern effortlessly negates Regulus' attack, who then resorts to summon the power of the twelve constellations, releasing it as a concentrated shockwave known as the Zodiac Clamation (ゾディアック・クラメーション, Zodiakku Kuramēshon). Regulus is consumed by the explosion, which the Wyvern survives unscathed. Having become an incorporeal entity, Regulus attacks the Specter once again, with the potent Lightning Bolt (ライトニングボルト, Raitoningu Boruto) Cosmo burst, which punches through the Specter's Surplice and body with ease. Having inflicted his final attack on the Specter, and fulfilled his destiny as a Saint, Regulus rejoins his father in the afterlife.

He reappears in spiritual form during the attack of golden light unleashed by the Gold Saints on Hades.

==== Virgo Asmita ====
Voiced by: Akira Ishida (Japanese); Greg Chun (English)

Virgo Asmita (乙女座(バルゴ)のアスミタ, Barugo no Asumita) is the Virgo Gold Saint in Lost Canvas. Asmita is blind (being called "the blind Saint"), and says his eyes maintain closed and he can't open them. Asmita has an introspective personality and practices Buddhism in the Sanctuary, something not accepted by Taurus Aldebaran. He does not consider Sasha as a good goddess as she is the sister of Alone and he has thought of betraying and killing her. His ideology remains unchanged until he encounters Pegasus Tenma in the Underworld and recognizes their strength. Asmita can perform a large number of techniques inspired by Hinduism and Buddhism tradition, such as Om (ॐ(オーム), ōmu) to flare his Cosmo to the maximum, and the Hāṃ (हां(カーン), Kān) to create a barrier around him. Demon Pacifier (天魔降伏, Tenma Kōfuku) is a powerful attack which manifests Asmita's Cosmo physically between his palms. Afterward, a powerful burst of light obliterates any adversary. Six Paths of Transmigration (六道輪廻, Rikudō Rinne) allows Asmita to send his opponent to one of the six rebirth realms of Saṃsāra doctrine. He is also able to perform Heavenly Supremacy of Spirits of Rivers and Mountains Over Evil (天空覇邪魑魅魍魎, Tenkūhaja Chimimōryō), summoning spiritual entities that kill the opponents. An additional technique is revealed in his Anecdotes chapter, the Demon subduer Mudra (降魔印, Gōma'in), which he uses to negate the attack of a Specter during a trip to one of the Six Realms of afterlife. His most powerful technique, an offensive and defensive move representing the perfect balance and truth of the universe, is Heaven's Ultimate Law (天舞宝輪, Tenbu Hōrin), which allows him to destroy all five senses of enemies. Asmita sacrifices himself by awakening the 8th Sense in order to create the 108 counts Mala, so Hades' warriors cannot return to life. In that moment, he also regains his eyesight and before dying he entrusts Athena to Tenma. Still, it seems his soul is bound to Tenma's Cloth by the blood he used to repair it. In flashbacks, it was revealed that Asmita was also known as the man who is almost a god, and that he prevented Gemini Defteros from killing the Pope and prepared to engage Gemini Aspros on a One Thousand Days War (千日戦争(ワンサウザンドウォーズ), Wan Sauzando Wōzu), a battle between Gold Saints. By order of the Pope, Asmita faced Defteros instead, performing his Dharmacakra Mudra (転法輪印, Tenpōrin'in) allowing the younger Gemini to dissipate his doubts and see his true identity, thus helping him free himself from his brother's control. Later on, Tenma's Pegasus Cloth reaches a new level of endurance due to Asmita's blood.

He last appears in spiritual form during the attack of golden light unleashed by the Gold Saints on Hades.

==== Libra Dohko ====
Voiced by: Kenta Miyake (Japanese); Ray Chase (English)

Libra Dohko (天秤座(ライブラ)の童虎, Raibura no Dōko) is the Libra Gold Saint. Portrayed during his youth, he shows signs of slight rashness and immaturity, feeling great respect for his partners, turning pretty furious if they are in danger. However, in such occasions, he does not quite concern about consequences. He is a good friend of Aries Shion and Taurus Aldebaran to whom he often talks and confides his way of thinking is thanks to them. Departing from Kurumada's canon, Dohko is portrayed as Tenma's master. One of his shown techniques are the Lushan One Hundred Dragons Force (廬山百龍覇, Rozan Hyakuryū Ha) in which he plows through the enemy with both arms and palms extended. One hundred bursts of Cosmo shaped as dragons appear around him as the enemies are destroyed by this energy-based offensive move, another attack is the Lushan Dragon Flight (廬山龍飛翔, Rozan Ryū Hishō), a straight-to-the-point, jumping attack where Dohko charges through his opponents with a single fist, against Hades, Dohko used Libra's trident, hidden beneath the attack. Also, his Libra Cloth contains a pair of six types of weapon, namely sword, shield, trident, nunchaku, tonfa and sanjiegun. He exhibits an additional technique in his Anecdotes, the Playful Tiger's Dance in the crowd (遊虎千人演舞, Yūko Sen'nin Enbu), which allows him to single-handed disable dozens of opponents.

He first appears in the Lost Canvas alternate timeline during a mission to locate Hades. During his search, he stumbles upon Tenma using his Cosmo to save his village from a mudslide. Dohko saves Tenma's life and then offers him to become a Saint. During the next two years he visited Tenma during his training until Tenma became the Pegasus Bronze Saint and started seeing him as a younger brother, although other Gold Saints consider Tenma as Dohko's student. Dohko aids Tenma in fighting Hades himself inside the Cathedral in Italy. After both are overpowered, Dohko helps Tenma and his friends escape while he confronts Hades alone, who pierces him with his sword. Dohko reappears healing his chest wound inside the smoke of Canon's island volcano, unconscious for about one month being helped by Gemini Defteros and Bennu Kagaho. He is sent to revive Athena's Cloth back at the Sanctuary, being stopped by three Specters, Minotauros Gordon, Alraune Quinn and Basilisk Sylphid. Defeating them after bloody battles, Dohko is greeted by the challenge of Bennu Kagaho, who reveals he must extract the divine blood in his veins, to revive Athena's Cloth, as Hades desires. Dohko is punished by Kagaho's Crucify Ankh, causing him to bleed over Athena's statue, triggering the resurrection of the goddess' Cloth. As the Specter snatches Athena's Cloth, Dohko miraculously reincorporates and retrieves the Cloth from the Specter's grasp. As Dohko collapses from exhaustion, his body and the Cloth receive the protection of Gemini Defteros, who arrives at the battlefield. Dohko's knowledge about the secret of Athena's Cloth is removed from his memory by Defteros, who later sent him to the Lost Canvas, carrying the Cloth of the goddess. Following Tenma's Cosmo, Libra leaves the expansion of Defteros' Another Dimension, appearing in the Third Demon Temple: Terra, just in time to relieve Sasha, Tenma and Regulus from Bennu Kagaho's Crucify Ankh. He greets Tenma and then prepares to engage in battle with his sworn enemy, not before delivering Athena's Cloth to Sasha and letting her, along with Tenma and Regulus, go to the next temple. Both combatants' Cosmos clash, with Kagaho noticing that Dohko has become stronger since he still holds Athena's blood inside him. Then Dohko receives Kagaho's Rising Darkness technique, being dehydrated by the intense heat. During his anguish, Dohko reminisces about his time as a Saint apprentice in Mount Lu, afterwards he uses the Lushan Rising Dragon Force (廬山昇龍覇, Rozan Shōryūha), a fearsome blow of tremendous strength that destroyed Kagaho's black sun soaring into the air as an image of a dragon devouring it. He later reveals to Kagaho that he shares the same spiritual pain that tormented his master, and intends to bring Kagaho back to the path of virtue. As he receives Kagaho's fierce attack, Dohko is sent flying against the Ankh that symbolized a grave in the Terra Temple, and is able to look at Kagaho's memories, finding out about his dead younger brother. He then grabs the Specter from behind and performs his final technique, Lushan's Enraged Dragon Force (廬山亢龍覇, Rozan Kōryūha), an explosion of Cosmo that sends both the user and the victim flying upwards at high speed, to be burnt by atmospheric friction. As they leave the planet, Dohko is questioned by his rival about his reasons for dying along with him. Kagaho understands then Dohko's motives and remembers his brother, grabbing Libra and sends him back down to the ground to save his life. His unconscious body was picked by Aspros at some time, and then entrusted to Tenma to take care of. Dohko and Shion remain unconscious as Tenma finally reaches Alone. After Hades is expelled from Alone's body, the deity's soul flees and is pursued by Tenma and Alone. Before joining them, Athena approaches Dohko and entrusts him with the responsibility of guarding the sealed souls of the Specters, so that in the future, when they come back to life, it will become the harbinger of the new Holy War. To such end, Athena bestows on Dohko the divine gift of Misopethamenos (ミソペサメノス, Misopesamenos), (from the Greek Greek μισόπεθαμένος: "semi-dead"), which grants him incredible longevity by means of a process of simulated aging and reduced cardiac activity, becoming thus the reason of Dohko's surviving until the late 20th century. Having survived the Holy War, Dohko returns to Sanctuary, where he talks to his friend Shion about the events they witnessed, and parts to his homeland Lushan in China, upon arriving, he starts fulfilling the duty entrusted to him by Athena in the centuries to come, knowing in his heart that a new generation of Saints will fight to protect peace on Earth, in the future.

Dohko reappears once more in the epilogue included in vol. 25 of The Lost Canvas, as the aged Libra Old Master (天秤座(ライブラ)の老師, Raibura no Rōshi) 243 years after the defeat of Hades.

==== Scorpio Kardia ====
Voiced by: Kōji Yusa (Japanese); Christopher Corey Smith (English)

Scorpio Kardia (蠍座(スコーピオン)のカルディア, Sukōpion no Karudia) is the Scorpio Gold Saint in Lost Canvas. He was portrayed as a close acquaintance of the Aquarius Gold Saint. He held the Specter Frog Zelos as a prisoner in his temple. Kardia is introduced as a merciless sadist and a prideful, arrogant, and boastful warrior with an explosive personality. He saved a young Yato and his sister from an unnamed Specter and took the boy to the Sanctuary to be trained as a Saint. Later, Kardia joins Aquarius Dégel in his mission to Siberia to enlist the aid of the Blue Warriors in the war against Hades. It was also revealed in his Anecdotes that Kardia protected Athena when she was a young girl from the attack of the Jaguar warriors and prevented the resurrection of their god. Arriving in Bluegrad (ブルーグラード, Burūgurādo), Kardia and Dégel were attacked by the Blue Warriors, after escaping from the attack the Scorpio Gold Saint unleashes his technique known as Scarlet Needle (スカーレット ニードル, Sukāretto Nīdoru), with which he launches a crimson needle to 14 body parts (which represents the stars of Scorpius) to poison opponents, causing bleeding and excruciating pain, losing their 5 senses in the process, upon receiving several of the blows, the result can only be either madness or death. Kardia finished opponents with Antares Needle (アンタレス ニードル, Antaresu Nīdoru), the killing blow of the Scarlet Needle combination. Also, Kardia exhibits a new technique which is known as Katakaio Needle (カタケオ ニードル, Katakeo Nīdoru) (from the Ancient Greek κατακαίω (Katakaio), usually translated as "utterly burned"), used on exceptionally powerful foes, and essentially causes Kardia's opponent's blood to boil within themselves, while connected to Kardia's heart lifeforce. After successfully inflicting 14 hits, Kardia finishes the Katakaio Needle with Katakaio Antares (カタケオ アンタレス, Katakeo Antaresu), the fifteenth star of the Scorpius constellation, which delivers the killing stroke for his opponent.

During his fight against Rhadamanthys we discover that besides being a Saint of Athena, Kardia is addicted to fights, therefore, he fights for his own amusement. Further motivation comes from a degenerative heart disease which shortens his life, which has been treated by Dégel using his freezing ability to stabilize Kardia's heart temperature. Kardia decided to live his short life intensely, only doing what he pleases and encountering death while facing a strong adversary. His death wish is fulfilled while fighting Wyvern Rhadamanthys, who, he was able to defeat. While presumed dead, Kardia appeared once more when Unity was escaping the crumbling Atlantis, as he helped him to reach the surface alive. When he awoke, Unity noticed Kardia's red nail in his hand, implying the Gold Saint died shortly thereafter, leaving the prince with the nail as a memento of himself, which helped keep Unity warm. It was revealed in his Anecdotes that at the age of ten the doctors said because of his fragile health he would die in one year. Then he run away from the hospital and got lost. He then experiences excruciating chest pain. He was saved by Kōh-i-Nūr Krjest, Aquarius Dégel's mentor, who has Athena's blood running through his veins. Krjest tells Kardia he could become immortal, but the young Saint apprentice replies he only wished to live his life in an intense way, it doesn't matter if it is short or long. Kardia accepted the holy blood and is saved of his disease but because of the divine blood, his heart starts burning.

He last appears in spiritual form during the attack of golden light unleashed by the Gold Saints on Hades.

==== Sagittarius Sisyphos ====
Voiced by: Hirofumi Nojima (Japanese); Patrick Seitz (English)

Sagittarius Sisyphos (射手座(サジタリアス)のシジフォス, Sajitariasu no Shijifosu) is the man who took Sasha to Sanctuary, laying great hopes on her. Younger brother of Leo Ilias and uncle and mentor to Leo Regulus. During his known missions, he looked for information about Hypnos and Thanatos, finding about the four Dream gods. During the invasion of Hades to the Sanctuary, he attacks Hades with a Gold Arrow but Hades reverts it easily piercing his heart, ending up in a comatose state. His Cosmo is then sealed by Hypnos and Thanatos, and his soul is trapped in the Dream World by the Dream gods. He later appears in the final dream of Taurus Aldebaran, reminding him how much it hurts Athena when one of her Saints dies. He later awakes from his coma, having been rescued by Sasha during the fight between Oneiros and El Cid/Tenma. This enables him to assist his fellow Saints against the dream god, shooting his golden arrow from the Pope's temple in the Sanctuary, which is intercepted in midair and cut in four by El Cid, and then pierces the four weak spots of Oneiros, thus rendering him all but vulnerable. He is entrusted by Hakurei to lead the forces of Athena during the absence of the Pope. It was also revealed that he refused being a candidate for the succession of the Pope. He later appear in Jamir, to lead Athena's army into the Lost Canvas, by using the boat of hope. To defend the boat from the attack of Aiacos, Sisyphos uses arrows made of Cosmo, shooting them with his bow and his direct attack Cheiron's Light Impulse (ケイロンズライトインパルス, Keironzu Raito Inparusu) a powerful blast of ray of light, that provokes a massive whirlwind, extinguishing all the fire that covered Aiacos' and Athena's ship. He was able to reach the eighth sense after blinding himself. Because of the massive level of Cosmo he reached, Sisyphos was able to defeat Garuda Aiacos.

Entering the Lost Canvas, Sisyphos put his heart as a test to Pharaoh's curse, managing to get as pure as the Feather of Maat, then slaying the Specter with his technique. His heart however was ripped out of his chest, causing his death. In a final assault, the Sagittarius Gold Saint managed to help Leo Regulus and Aries Shion to perform the technique forbidden since ancient times, Athena Exclamation (アテナエクスクラメーション, Atena Ekusukuramēshon), that allows three Gold Saints to provide a monstrous amount of Cosmo capable of reaching a Big Bang in a small scale, releasing it as a single and outstanding blow, destroying the gates of the Lost Canvas. Before his death, it is revealed that Sisyphos' feelings and motivations to protect Sasha went beyond simple devotion as a Saint. He last appears in spiritual form during the attack of golden light unleashed by the Gold Saints on Hades.

==== Capricorn El Cid ====
Voiced by: Kazuya Nakai (Japanese); Neil Kaplan (English)

Capricorn El Cid (山羊座(カプリコーン)のエルシド, Kapurikōn no Erushido) is the Capricorn Gold Saint in Lost Canvas. El Cid appears to be a quiet and introspective character, seeming a silent assassin. He appears in a mission to help Manigoldo in Hades' Forest, he was intercepted by 6 Specters which he killed with his arm-sword technique. Later, the gods of Dream appear and El Cid attacks one of them, Icelos. Icelos warps space, so the attack cuts El Cid's own arm. He attacks the god again, but is cast down a cliff and is last seen unconscious. After some time, the Capricorn Saint appears cutting a dimension and entering the dream world, where he challenges and kills Phantasos by cutting him in a half, later, he is confronted by the Illusion god Icelos. El Cid appears to be harmed by the god's ability to warp the space, thus returning the Gold Saint own power, and appearing from any part of the dream world to attack. However, using his own blood to mark the space warped, El Cid could detect where Icelos would appear, and thus decapitated him. El Cid continues his journey to save Sisyphos from the dream world, he encountered Pegasus Tenma and saved him from the collapse of Morphia, when they tried to reach Sisyphos' Dreams, Oneiros, the god of Dreams appears and summons his 3 deceased brothers to join him in a monstrous creature. El Cid and Tenma's souls are about to be destroyed when Athena saves them with her staff that represents the goddess Niké, the Saints then tag in a team to confront the monstrous god, El Cid cuts the dimension, opening a hole in the Dream World, later he employs Jumping Stone (ジャンピングストーン, Janpingu Sutōn), a powerful blow from his legs, to send the Dream Gods to the real world via the hole opened by his technique. At last, he cuts the Sagittarius golden arrow in 4, to hit Oneiros, using his arm sword technique calling it by name: Excalibur (エクスカリバー, Ekusukaribā), the sacred sword. Thus he finally succeeds in defeating Oneiros.

However, in the god's last assault, El Cid defended Tenma by thrusting his amputated arm into Oneiros' heart, being killed in a great explosion with the Dream Gods, while they were rising into the sky. He last appears in spiritual form during the attack of golden light unleashed by the Gold Saints on Hades.

==== Aquarius Dégel ====
Voiced by: Daisuke Hirakawa (Japanese); Christopher Niosi (English)

Aquarius Dégel (水瓶座(アクエリアス)のデジェル, Akueriasu no Dejeru) is the Aquarius Gold Saint in Lost Canvas. He is known in Sanctuary as the "wisest among Athena's Saints". He is the only person, besides the Great Pope, who can read and interpret the stars. Apart from this he appears to be very calm and polite. He has his own library and is the only Saint who wears glasses. It is revealed in his Anecdotes chapter that he is a young man of noble blood. He first appears questioning Sisyphos about the Great Pope. He already knew Sage was dead and the one who had invaded Hades Cathedral wasn't him but his brother, Hakurei, who had dressed in the Pope's clothes. He was at first involved in an investigation regarding Bluegrad's Blue Warriors and the seal of Poseidon. In Bluegrad both him and Scorpio Kardia found a way to Poseidon's submarine temple, known as Atlantis. There, Dégel watches his old friend Unity being killed by Rhadamanthys, in anger, Dégel attacks with Aurora Execution (オーロラエクスキューション, Ōrora Ekusukyūshon), which is a powerful blast that simulates the Aurora, freezing the air temperature to its maximum (reaching near, or sometimes precisely Absolute Zero). Later, he uses Koĺtso (カリツォー, Karitsō), the Russian name for Ice Ring (氷の輪, Kōri no rin), which creates rings of icy wind that circles the opponent's body stopping depriving him of movement, to stop Pandora. Dégel also exhibits a more powerful variant of the Koĺtso technique in his Anecdotes, known as Grand Koĺtso (グランカリツォー, Guran Karitsō), and also in Anecdotes, he performs a potent variant of the Diamond Dust technique known as Diamond Dust - Ray (ダイヤモンドダスト・レイ, Daiyamondo Dasuto - Rei). None of Dégel attacks were effective against Rhadamanthys, but soon after Kardia mentions he is surprised of Dégel's poor performance in battle due to the murder of Unity. The reason behind Dégel's failure was attacking out of rage instead of executing precise strikes. Being a Saint who uses freezing attacks, Dégel needs to concentrate as the basis of his combat style lies in stopping the movement of atoms, not destroying them.

Nevertheless, Dégel finds out Unity was alive and had become a Mariner General (海闘士(マリーナ)海将軍(ジェネラル), Marīna Jeneraru), one of the seven most powerful warriors of Poseidon. He refuses to fight his friend Unity, now wearing the Sea Dragon Scale. However, Unity tries to manipulate Dégel's movements with his coral in order to break Athena's seal and free Poseidon. While Unity attacks, Dégel realizes what has happened to his friend: Unity became desperate to save Bluegrad from the eternal cold, therefore he finds Athena's Amphora, the container of Poseidon's soul, and the Scales. He is then show killing his father and promising to make Bluegrad the greatest country of the world. Dégel is infuriated and freezes all the corals, then he uses Diamond Dust (ダイヤモンドダスト, Daiyamondo Dasuto), a windy concentrated attack that blasts ice and snow in a focused point, told to be as beautiful as a diamond, but as deadly as a snowstorm. Finally, Dégel realizes Unity will never give up his plans and decides to fight seriously. He says he will defeat his friend but would keep their promise alive. By using Aurora Execution Dégel freezes the whole sea that collapses Poseidon's statue. With that movement Unity was freed from the power of Poseidon. Dégel succeeds to retrieve the Orichalcum, a crystal that contains Poseidon's power, however, after retrieving from Unity, it is stolen and partially broken by Pandora unleashing the true power of Poseidon into Seraphina's body. In order to contain that huge power of the Sea god, Dégel freezes himself, Unity's sister Seraphina and all Atlantis inside the Freezing Coffin (フリージングコフィン, Furījingu Kofin) a technique used to lock a body inside a coffin made of ice. At this time Dégel reaches Absolute Zero. Thus he could prevent the world from being destroyed by Poseidon and entrusts Unity to take the Orichalcum to Sasha. In his last words Dégel says both he and Seraphina would watch over Bluegrad, the Earth and Unity, blessing his steps.

He last appears in spiritual form during the attack of golden light unleashed by the Gold Saints on Hades. Named after the word dégel, french for thaw.

==== Pisces Albafica ====
Voiced by: Hiroshi Kamiya (Japanese); Johnny Yong Bosch (English)

Pisces Albafica (魚座(ピスケス)のアルバフィカ, Pisukesu no Arubafika) is the Pisces Gold Saint in Lost Canvas. Extremely beautiful, living amidst a poisonous rose field for years, he gains absolute immunity towards any kind of poison, although that power comes with a great price. Due to living in that very same poisonous environment, his blood too turned poisonous after excessive exposure. This led him to be considered as extremely cold because despite his striking beauty, he tends to avoid contact with people. It was revealed in his Anecdotes that he was abandoned as a newborn and raised by his mentor, the previous Pisces Saint, Lugonis. Albafica uses three types of roses with different offensive abilities, his Royal Demon Rose (ロイヤルデモンローズ, Roiyaru Demon Rōzu), the red rose, also spelled alternatively in kanji as Demon Rose (魔宮薔薇(デモンローズ), Demon Rōzu) in Anecdotes, damages the opponents by destroying their senses, the Piranhan Rose (ピラニアンローズ, Piranian Rōzu), a black rose, is a directly offensive rose that devours everything upon contact and the Bloody Rose (ブラッディローズ, Buraddi Rōzu), a white rose, drains the blood of the victim to death and can also detect and follow the enemy's heart wherever it may be. Albafica can also create a sea of Royal Demon Roses to damage anyone in the vicinity. His poisonous blood too, when drawn, can be used in an attack called Crimson Thorn (クリムゾンソーン, Kurimuzon Sōn), creating crimson mist and then innumerable needles made of his poisonous blood clots capable of directly administrating poison into his victim's veins. Despite an easy victory over Deep Niobe, Albafica is unable to match up to the power of Griffon Minos. He therefore uses a Bloody Rose that has been turned red by a pool of his own poisonous blood and so manages to administrate the poison in Minos' veins. But because of the large amount of blood consumed in the diversion, he too dies shortly. In the very last moments of his life, after despising his poisonous roses for years because of the curse they put upon his blood, he finally finds them beautiful.

He last appears in spiritual form during the attack of golden light unleashed by the Gold Saints on Hades.

=== Other Gold Saints ===
==== 13th Century Holy War ====
- Libra Itia (天秤座（ライブラ）のイティア, Raibura no Itia) the Libra Gold Saint in the 13 th century generation.
- Aquarius Krest (水瓶座のクレスト, Akueriasu no Kuresuto) the Aquarius Gold Saint in the 13th century, and veteran of several Holy Wars. Comrade in arms to Leo Ilias, Cancer Sage, Scorpio Zaphiri and Pisces Lugonis, and mentor to Aquarius Dégel. He appears in the days of his youth, as a wise and prudent Gold Saint who is aware of the crisis faced by Athena's Sanctuary.

==== 15th Century Holy War ====
- Aries Gateguard (牡羊座 (アリエス) のゲートガード, Ariesu no Gētogādo) the Aries Gold Saint in the previous 15th century generation. Comrade in arms to Cancer Sage and Aquarius Krjest. He appears to show allegiance to Hades.
- Aries Avenir (牡羊座 (アリエス) のアヴニール, Ariesu no Avunīru) the Aries Gold Saint in the 15th century, veteran of the Holy War against Hades in that era, and comrade-in-arms and close friend to Altar Hakurei and Cancer Sage.
- Taurus Francisca (牡牛座 (タウラス) のフランキスカ, Taurasu no Furankisuka) the Taurus Gold Saint in the previous 15th century generation. Comrade in arms to Cancer Sage and Aquarius Krest.
- Cancer Sage (蟹座 (キャンサー) のセージ, Kyansā no Sēji) is the Pope in Sanctuary and the former Cancer Gold Saint. Sage and his twin brother Hakurei are the only Saints who survived the last Holy war and since then he has been planning his revenge against Thanatos and Hypnos due to the death of all his partners. As the Pope, Sage trained Manigoldo who became the next Cancer Saint and also investigates about the gods related with Hades. Sage is skilled in techniques related with souls and also has a large number of talismans able to seal the power of the gods, called Talisman Cage (タリスマン・ケージ, Tarisuman Kēji). During his encounter with Thanatos, he seals him in the Holy Coffer thanks to his brother's Altar Silver Cloth, paying that with his life. It was revealed in flashbacks, that Sage was aware of Gemini Aspros' treason and his plot to assassinate him. Sage devised a strategy along with Virgo Asmita to discover his motivations.
- Sagittarius Aeras (射手座 (サジタリアス) のアエラス, Sajitariasu no Aerasu) the Sagittarius Gold Saint in the previous 15th century generation.

===== Gemini Aspros =====
Gemini Aspros (双子座(ジェミニ)のアスプロス, Jemini no Asupurosu) is Gemini Defteros' late twin older brother. Once a virtuous Saint, Aspros was executed for plotting against the Sanctuary and wanting to steal Athena's Cloth to rule over Sanctuary. When the brothers reminisce about their past, it is revealed that rumor in Sanctuary had Aspros as the virtual successor of the Pope, however, the latter chose another prospect he considered the fittest. Enraged for having failed in attaining his goal of becoming Pope of the Sanctuary, Aspros violates the sanctity of Star Hill, a place reserved only to the Popes, and steals secrets kept there for ages. It is also revealed that the year his execution took place, Aspros manipulated Defteros with the forbidden technique that he learned in Star Hill, the Demon Emperor's Delusional Fist (幻朧魔皇拳, Genrōmaōken), in order to assassinate the Pope of Sanctuary, taking advantage of the fact that Defteros existence was almost totally unknown. As Defteros trespassed the Chambers of the Pope to fulfill his mission, he was stopped by his brother, who pretended to protect the Pope and to be ready to kill his brother in punishment for treason. As the Pope turned his back to avoid the scene, Aspros prepared to kill him, only to be stopped by Virgo Asmita. After Defteros was freed by Asmita from the effects of the Delusional Fist, Aspros received his brother's lethal attack. The Pope reveals that his seat was destined to be Aspros' had he not deviated from the path of virtue. Humiliated by his defeat at the hands of whom he considered a shadow, Aspros applies his Delusional Fist on himself, to assure he would achieve his goal even if having to return from beyond the grave. His body was taken by Defteros to Canon Island. After being resurrected by Hades, he appears before his brother immediately after the latter saves Libra Dohko from Bennu Kagaho, and engages him in battle. Revealed by Hades to be also the guardian of the Fourth Demon Temple: Mars (第4魔宮火星, Dai yon Makyū Marusu). As a servant of Hades, he was granted the Gemini Surplice, a dark reflection of the prideful Gold Cloth he once wore. In the past, 16 years before the events depicted in Lost Canvas, Aspros shared with Defteros the dire trials required to become a Saint. Aspros was very protective of his younger brother, who was considered a wasted life born under an unfortunate star. Years later, bearing a grudge against his brother for his execution, Aspros tries unsuccessfully to kill his twin during their encounter in the Mars Temple, with their signature and most destructive technique: Galaxian Explosion (ギャラクシアンエクスプロージョン, Gyarakushian Ekusupurōjon), a massive burst of Cosmo that easily vaporizes opponents, said to be capable of smashing stars. Aspros overpowers his brother with ease, and reveals his gentle nature of the past was but a facade, as his goal of domination required him to become purely evil. Determined to end the battle, Aspros clashes with Defteros in a final effort. Consuming his brother's Galaxian Explosion with his own, Aspros believes himself the victor, only to realize that during the clash, his brother sacrificed his life in front of him, negating the effect of the Delusional Fist, and thus making him return to his old, good-natured self, and is accepted by the Gemini Gold Cloth. Aspros then turns on Hades revealing his intentions, only to be stopped by Mephistopheles Yōma, who dissolves his body into quantum particles. After Yōma later dissolves Shion with his Marvelous Room technique, Aspros reappears carrying with him Dohko and Shion, to engage Yōma in battle. In order to prevent the Specter from stopping time, Aspros transport their fight into the Another Dimension, a place where time is always flowing, moving at lightspeed. Then Aspros survived Yōma's Rewind Bio due to his undying nature as a Specter and forced Yōma to reveal his true form with Galaxian Explosion. Aware that his opponent is a god, Aspros prepares to unleash his full power. After a fierce battle, Aspros manages to open a dimensional gateway to the Heavenly Realm, which destroys Yōma's body completely, and seals his soul away within the 108 beads mala forever. Aspros' temporary life as a Specter reaches its end, and he states his repentance for his crimes to Athena, delivering the 108 beads mala to her. Having fulfilled his duty, Aspros' body dissolves, leaving the Gemini Surplice and the Gemini Gold Cloth behind, and his soul departs to eternity.

He last appears in spiritual form during the attack of golden light unleashed by the Gold Saints on Hades.

===== Leo Ilias =====
Leo Ilias (獅子座(レオ)のイリアス, reo no iriasu) was the predecessor Leo Saint in the 18th century, known as 'the man who talked to Earth' and said to be the first man to break off one of Wyvern Rhadamanthys' horns, who killed him. Father of Leo Regulus. According to his younger brother Sagittarius Sisyphos, the most powerful and virtuous Saint of that generation. Ten years before the events in Lost Canvas, Ilias encounters Wyvern in a forest, along with Harpy Valentine, Frog Zelos and a small group of Skeleton soldiers, on a mission to destroy a local village. The Leo Saint performs his Lightning Plasma (ライトニングプラズマ, Raitoningu Purazuma) technique, to stop the Specters' attack, killing the Skeleton soldiers and saving the villagers lives. Due to lung illness, he couldn't use fullness of his power. Afterward, the Underworld Commander gravely wounds Ilias, who before dying cuts off one of Wyvern's horns, as he promised, leaving his son Regulus, believing in his future and his bright star.

===== Pisces Lugonis =====
Voiced by: Jūrōta Kosugi

Pisces Lugonis (魚座(ピスケス)のルゴニス, Pisukesu no Rugonisu) was the previous Pisces Gold Saint and the master of Pisces Albafica. He adopted an orphan Albafica when the latter was a baby, cared for him and trained him in the ways of the Saints. Wanting Albafica to become the next Pisces Gold Saint after his death, he performed a ritual along with his disciple, consisting on exchanging blood to see who has the most poisonous one. Albafica's deadly poison blood proves too much for Lugonis, and he dies entrusting his pupil the Pisces Gold Cloth and his position as a Saint.

===== Scorpio Zaphiri =====
Scorpio Zaphiri (蠍座(スコーピオン)のザフィリ, Sukōpion no Zafiri) the strong-willed and determined Scorpio Gold Saint in the previous 18th century generation. He intended to bestow Poseidon's divine power upon himself at the expense of his life and his dignity as a Saint.

==== Post-Holy War 18th Century ====
- Taurus Teneo (牡牛座（テネオのタウラス, taurasu no teneo) previously a Saint apprentice under Taurus Rasgado, Teneo became the inheritor of the Taurus Gold Cloth and the status of the Taurus Gold Saint after his mentor's demise in the Holy War of 1747. Six years later, Teneo fulfills his duty as guardian of the Taurus Palace at Sanctuary.

==== 20th Century Holy War ====
- Aries Mu (牡羊座(アリエス)のムウ, Ariesu no Mū), the Aries Gold Saint in the 20th century and disciple of Aries Shion, appears briefly in the epilogue included in vol. 25 of The Lost Canvas, in the waterfall of Lushan's Five Old Peaks, talking to Athena Saori and the aged Libra Rōshi, 243 years after the defeat of Hades.

== Hades's Army ==
=== Pandora ===
Birthdate: June 25
Age: 19
Height: 168cm
Weight: 55kg
Blood type: A
Voiced by: Nana Mizuki (Japanese); Cristina Vee (English)

Pandora (パンドラ, Pandora) is the woman responsible to "bring evil on Earth", as she is depicted in Greek mythology. She reincarnates in every era Hades has to resurrect, choosing a mortal host suitable for her master's might and acting as his lieutenant and the commander of the Specters. In Lost Canvas she is depicted as being so attached to Hades to the point of hysteria and paranoia (Hades defined himself "a bird in a cage"); nevertheless she is a merciless and loyal servant of the god of the Underworld. She used to be a pawn of Hypnos and Thanatos' (whom she was frightened by) schemes, which often put her against her own beliefs and wishes, prompting her to seal Hades away so as to keep him focused on painting the Lost Canvas. Pandora is crushed upon learning that it had been Alone, not Hades, who had been at her side since they met. With her heart full of sorrow, she departs to find the true Hades, and to punish Alone, whom she hates. She last appeared mobilizing Hades' army, after the defeat of Bennu Kagaho, later, she is enraged by Harpy Valentine's defiance, and aiming to break his will by means of torture, she performs her Noble Venom (ノーブルベノム, Nōburu Benomu) technique on him, which induces excruciating pain. Her attack is negated by the Specter and she is then the victim of his attack; however, she manages to break free and overwhelm Valentine, who is later punished by Rhadamanthys. Pandora then accepts the Underworld commander's apology and afterward encounters Athena, who before engaging her in battle, resurrects her Cloth and dons it. Pandora is later shocked momentarily by the memories Athena caused to flood her by reaching into her heart. She finds out Tenma is Partita's son, her only friend during her childhood. However, years ago, Pandora thought Partita had stolen Hades' soul from his mother. Desperate and confused, she sent the Skeleton soldiers to kill Partita and the newborn Tenma. Yōma then relishes torturing Pandora psychologically by revealing her that she killed Partita for a crime she never committed, and Partita then embraces her as if to provide her with consolation, only to inflict a murderous stroke instead, which she was able to survive. Pandora then arrives to Uranus and prepares to kill Partita. She is overpowered by the Specter and is mortally wounded by her intense Cosmo burst. Pandora's is then held by Tenma, who protects her by absorbing the impact of Partita's second Cosmo burst with his body. The moribund young woman bears witness to mother and son's battle. After the battle, Pandora reincorporates and sets out to find Alone. Once she finds him, Pandora is unable to take Alone's life and she is protected by Rhadamanthys from Alone's attack. The Wyvern Specter dies protecting her, and with the last of his strength sends her back to Earth. After the defeat of Hades, she last appears delivering the chest that contains the souls of Hypnos and Thanatos, sealed by Athena, at the shack in Heinstein Castle in Germany, the chest that she will open someday in the future, as is her destiny. She leaves then forever with Cheshire.

=== Deities ===
==== Thanatos ====
Voiced by: Shinji Kawada (Japanese); Vic Mignogna (English)

Thanatos, the god who rules death (死を司る神 タナトス, Shi o Tsukasadoru Kami Tanatosu) is a powerful deity subordinate to Hades and the twin brother of Hypnos. He is able to give a fraction of his own power to other Specters, and has direct command over Nasu Veronica, who shares the pentagram on his forehead. As a god he is capable of multiple feats, using Tartarus' Phobia (タルタロズフォビア, Tarutarozu Fobia), Thanatos can summon a large number of souls that attacks the enemy and with Terrible Providence (テリブルプロビデンス, Teriburu Purobidensu), Thanatos creates a powerful energy blast capable of destroying even the Gold Cloths, he is capable of summoning gigantic monsters resembling chess pieces to battle for him, or open the Godly Path, a space resembling the universe that destroys everything that is not a god in its interior. In his fight against Cancer Manigoldo and the Pope Sage, his host body is killed by Manigoldo, and his soul sealed by Sage inside a Holy Coffer empowered by Athena

==== Hypnos ====
Voiced by: Tomohiro Tsuboi (Japanese); Todd Haberkorn (English)

Hypnos, the god who rules sleep (眠りを司る神 ヒュプノス, Nemuri o Tsukasadoru Kami Hyupunosu) is the twin brother of Thanatos and also a powerful god in his own right. He has gold hair and eyes, and a hexagram star on his forehead. He plays a significant role in convincing the young Alone to become Hades's corporal vessel. He first appears as a priest from the cathedral located deep in the forest to persuade Alone, who at the time had trouble finding fitting colors for his painting, to look for a fruit that yields the True Red, the color that surpasses all colors. He subsequently convinces the grieving Alone to believe that death is the ultimate and final liberation of all things, thereby making him accept his destiny as Hades's corporal vessel. And, like his brother Thanatos, he is able to give a fraction of his power to someone else, as Pandora is briefly seen with the same hexagram star on her forehead. While indifferent to his brother's and sons' deaths, he further convinced Alone to embrace the darkness of Hades' essence using the Eternal Drowsiness (エターナル・ドラウジネス, Etānaru Doraujinesu) to put Alone in a deep state of sleepness, and then stood up against the invading Saints, defeating easily (albeit off-panels) Shion and Yuzuriha, and then engaging Hakurei. It was then he used his attack Encounter Another Field (エンカウンタアナザーフィールド, Enkaunta Anazā Fīrudo), which brings any of his opponents' dreams to reality. After being distracted by the energy ball that Hakurei made out of the summoned, fallen Saints from the previous Holy War, Hypnos is finally sealed by Hakurei who uses his young-age soul.

==== The Gods of Dreams ====
The Gods of Dreams (夢の神, Yume no Kami) is the collective name for the four minor gods working under Hypnos. Entirely devoted to his will, they are called brothers and children of the god of sleep, Hypnos.

===== Dream God Oneiros =====
Voiced by: Hideo Ishikawa (Japanese); Christopher Corey Smith (English)

Dream God Oneiros (夢神・オネイロス, Mushin Oneirosu) is the leader of the gods of Dreams. In Greek mythology, he doesn't exist as a personified deity, for his very name in the myth is spelled as Oneiroi, and it was the colloquial and collective term used to refer to Morpheus, Icelos and Phantasos. This hints at his true power, as Oneiros is the only son of Hypnos without a power of his own. Instead, after challenging Capricorn El Cid and Pegasus Tenma, he merged with the power of his brothers (fulfilling his role as union of the three Oneiroi, Phantasos, Icelos and Morpheus). In this state, Oneiros' body ends in his hips, and instead of legs he has a massive armored centaur-like creature, plus two additional arms on his shoulders. With his Guardian's Oracle (ガーディアンズオラクル, Gādianzu Orakuru) he can extinguish the souls of their enemies preventing them to reincarnate. Oneiros in this form is immune to the cut of El Cid's Excalibur, as he shows by rejoining his body after being split in half. He is however defeated by a combined effort between Sisyphos' arrow and El Cid's self-sacrifice.

===== Vision Icelus =====
Voiced by: Ryūsei Nakao (Japanese); Ezra Weisz (English)

Vision Icelus (幻夢・イケロス, Genmu Ikerosu) is the most savage and brutal of the dream gods. He is indeed bestial in appearance, resembling something of a vampire or even a werewolf due to his extremely long fangs, clawed hands and hunchback posture. He is often represented as a smilodon or another sort of beast, for he is the god of nightmares, appearing in the mortals' dreams as a monster or feral beast. He is able to warp space, thus sending his enemies' attacks to themselves, teleporting at will and cutting through space itself. Icelus fights Capricorn El Cid twice, firstly amputating the Saint's right arm, and secondly challenging him in the dream world. After a ferocious battle against the Capricorn Saint, during which he had the advantage, El Cid managed to spot the weak point in his power, using his own blood to find the warps in space. Thus he is defeated, dying beheaded by the Excalibur.

===== Portrayer Phantasos =====
Voiced by: Rie Kugimiya-female form, Satoshi Hino-male form (Japanese); Caitlin Glass-female form, Zach Aguilar-male form (English)

Portrayer Phantasos (仮象者・パンタソス, Kashōsha Pantasosu), the god who can wield unreality. He usually appears using a false image of a female version of him, and in the myths, as well as his manga counterpart, wielded the power of creating unreal and ominous dreams. He is cut in half by Capricorn El Cid, becoming the first of the dream gods to fall. While dying, Phantasos' "face" came off, as his disguise has been ripped off together with his body by El Cid's attack. In the anime adaptation, the technique he used to ensnare his victims in their dreams was given the name Grim Fantasia (グリム・ファンタジア, Gurimu Fantajia).

===== Modeler Morpheus =====
Voiced by: Hiroshi Tsuchida (Japanese); Joe Ochman (English)

Modeler Morpheus (造形者・モルペウス, Zōkeisha Morupeusu) is the fourth of the sons of Hypnos, the one in charge of controlling the dreams of heroes and monarchs. He is the one that held Tenma captive in the dream world, trapping the Pegasus Saint in a dream-like reality. Morpheus uses the Poppies of the Dream World (夢界の芥子, Mukai no Keshi) to enter the conscience, dreams and hopes of the Pegasus Saint, which are gradually being forgotten as the poppies turn colorless. In the anime adaptation, the technique is renamed Morphium Coma (モルフィウム・コーマ, Morufiumu Kōma). After Athena's intervention, Tenma frees himself from the poppies, then he briefly fought Morpheus and imprisoned him again, only to be slain for good as Tenma reached the Big Will for a split second, temporarily awakening the Pegasus God Cloth in the process.

=== Specters ===
The Specters (冥闘士(スペクター), Supekutā) are the 108 soldiers of Hades, also known as the Demonic Stars, are the equivalents of Athena's Saints. Although many Specters are killed during the series, most are brought back to life by Hades. This advantage was lost when Sasha creates a barrier covering the Sanctuary to prevent their souls from being brought back to life. And later, Virgo Asmita also devised a means to seal their souls with the 108 Counts Mala. Some are newly introduced characters as there are also many Specters from the original manga. Some known Specters have only appeared in the shadow of Alone, and so have not been introduced. The Specters are divided according to their destiny stars: Earthly and Heavenly Stars.

==== Judges of the Underworld ====
===== Heavenly Noble Star, Griffon Minos =====
Voiced by: Takahiro Sakurai (Japanese); Trevor Devall (English)

Heavenly Noble Star, Griffon Minos (天貴星グリフォンのミーノス, Tenkisei Gurifon no Mīnosu) one of the Three Magnates of the Underworld, battled the Pisces Gold Saint of the same era. Minos is heartless, as he merely laughed when the Gold Saint Albafica informed him that his fellow Specters had fallen prey to the Gold Saint's trap. Minos is also an outright sadistic, as he seems to have derived some pleasure from destroying an exceptional fighter, such as Albafica, whom he temporarily triumphed over, and thus at one point making Aries Shion involved. In the end, it took the Pisces Saint's sacrificial effort to permanently destroy him, and also the Aries Saint's intervention to prevent him from annihilating everything around in retaliation for his inevitable death. With his signature technique, Cosmic Marionettion (コズミックマリオネーション, Kozumikku Marionēshon), (hence his title as "the Puppeteer") he creates invisible strings made purely out of Cosmo, with which he grabs his opponents' body, bending and twisting it as he wishes, in a grotesque and gruesome display of sadism. Minos can also use Gigantic Feathers Flap (ギガンティックフェザースフラップ, Gigantikku Fezāsu Furappu), where a massive burst of energy, similar to a shock wave, expands from Minos in every direction around him, destroying everything in its path. Additionally, Minos' incarnation during the 15th century appears briefly only in the Lost Canvas anime adaptation.

===== Heavenly Fierce Star, Wyvern Rhadamanthys =====
Heavenly Fierce Star, Wyvern Rhadamanthys (天猛星ワイバーンのラダマンティス, Tenmōsei Waibān no Radamantisu) appears in Atlantis, capital of Poseidon's (海王 ポセイドン, Kaiō Poseidon) domains, killing Unity, prince of Bluegrad, by piercing his torso with his bare hands. Rhadamanthys is then challenged by Aquarius Dégel, furious for revenge of his dead friend. He has exhibited a new technique, Greeting Roar (グリーディングロア, Gurīdingu Roa), which he performed against Aquarius Dégel, where after a resounding roar of the Wyvern, he glides toward the enemy performing numerous attacks. Another attack employed by Rhadamanthys is Greatest Caution (グレイテストコーション, Gureitesuto Kōshon), his signature technique from the original manga, a powerful move that flares Rhadamanthys' Cosmo to the maximum, then unleashes it on a central point via two opened palms, in the form of a devastating shock wave. The opponent becomes helpless as the powerful burst blasts them into oblivion. At close range and full power, it's powerful enough to destroy part of a Gold Cloth, as witnessed by Scorpio Kardia. Much like the original manga, Rhadamanthys, during his 18th century incarnation, is portrayed as quite a monster of a man, wielding enough power to withstand, completely unscratched, two shots from Aquarius Degel's Aurora Execution (notable for being the strongest ice technique of the entire series). He is fierce, extremely wrathful and prideful but also very loyal to Hades, and shows disrespect against Kardia, whom he considers a reckless and unworthy opponent. He seemingly meets his demise at the hands of the Scorpio Saint when the latter uses the Scarlet Needle Katakaioh. However, he reappeared before Hades, begging for forgiveness after failing in his duties. His loyalty put to test by Sphinx Pharaoh's Balance of Curse, he tore out his heart with his own hands so as to prove his faith in his god, which in turn healed him and restored his Surplice with his blood (this marks the very first time in the whole Saint Seiya franchise that a Surplice, or an armor different from those worn by the Saints, receives an upgrade). It has been revealed that Rhadamanthys is now the guardian of the Sixth Demon Temple: Saturnus. Within the Temple, the Underworld commander suffers unbearable pain after receiving Alone's blood, as a result of his injuries in Poseidon's domain. His subordinate Valentine guards the Saturnus Temple meanwhile he struggles to gain control of his newfound strength. Finally acquiring control of said power, Rhadamanthys announces his return with a resounding roar, and emerges from the Temple, with his Surplice bearing a new appearance. Despite Valentine's defense of his honor, Wyvern punishes the Specter for his defiance, gravely wounding him, and gladly pledges his loyalty to Pandora, humbly kneeling before her. Rhadamanthys then protects Pandora from Valentine's attack, and kills him. Returning to his Temple thereafter, the Specter and Pandora are surprised by the arrival of Athena and her Saints. Roaring vehemently, Wyvern steps into the battle, engaging Leo Regulus. After the defeat of Partita, Leo and Wyvern encounter each other again, and after attacking the Gold Saint, Wyvern, who is said to have surpassed all men, is surprised to witness he survived his assault. Both men engage each other in battle, which comes to a halt when Regulus takes the Specter's headpiece, which leads him to reminisce about the previous Leo Saint, Ilias, a man he remembers vividly. The battle resumes and his divine condition allows him to easily deflect Regulus' Athena Exclamation, although the Specter is surprised and acknowledges Regulus' battle prowess. Assaulted once again, Wyvern survives Regulus' Zodiac Exclamation, which claims the Saint's life. Rhadamanthys witnesses Regulus passing to the spiritual realm, and then is gravely wounded by Leo's soul. Shion arrives at the scene, to find the Underworld Commander still alive. The Specter leaves, arriving to Alone's chambers, encountering Pandora and protecting her from the former's assault. The Wyvern then states his contempt for Alone, as he usurped his Lord Hades' name and vows to kill him. Launching a murderous stroke, Wyvern misses Alone on purpose and strikes Athena's painting in the Lost Canvas, thus unsealing the divine powers of the goddess. Crippled and moribund, Rhadamanthys then sacrifices his life to protect Pandora from Alone's attack, as a final gesture of loyalty towards his lord Hades.

===== Heavenly Heroic Star, Garuda Aiacos =====
Heavenly Heroic Star, Garuda Aiacos (天雄星ガルーダのアイアコス, Ten'yūsei Garūda no Aiakosu) is an exceptionally powerful Specter. He was shown giving orders to Behemoth Violate, before dismembering a Skeleton soldier with an unnamed technique, with which he traced a cross in the air, generating an extreme cutting force. He is portrayed as quite heartless, similarly to Griffon Minos, but has an even "darker" vision of the world, as he treats his subordinates as slaves both living and dead with great disdain, serving him only by the fear of his power. This vision was questioned by Sagittarius Sisyphos when the two flying boats encountered each other. The Specter Violate harbored deep loyalty towards him. He used his technique Garuda Flap (ガルーダフラップ, Garūda Furappu) to send Behemoth Violate to attack the Bronze Saints who are fixing the Boat of Hope. The attack consists in throwing the enemy to the sky into a free-fall ending in an earth-shattering impact on the ground, later on, he used it against Sisyphos. Aiacos also displayed a new attack, Surendrajit (スレーンドラジト, Surēndorajito; from Hindi:सुरेन्द्र: Champion of Indra), with which he burns to death one of his loyal Skeletons, to enable him to transform their souls into a rain of flaming feathers. He also exhibits Galactica Death Bring (ギャラクティカデスブリング, Gyarakutika Desu Buringu), a technique that relies on immobilizing and burning the opponent's central nervous system from the inside out by channeling his Cosmo intensely through the eyes of the mask headpiece of the Garuda Surplice. He performed it on Sisyphos prior to trying to inflict the killing blow with his Garuda Flap. Even though Aiacos was successful in connecting both attacks, Sisyphos was able to survive their tremendous force. Aiacos is also capable of generating an X-like shaped symbol, which explodes creating a powerful burst of energy, damaging the surrounding area and enemies within it. Afterward, Aiacos is engaged by Sisyphos again, after awakening to the Eight Sense. Summoning all of his Cosmo, Sisyphos strikes Aiacos powerfully to the chest, shattering his Garuda Surplice and sending him flying, apparently killing him. However, it is later revealed that the Garuda Specter survived Sisyphos' assault. Hades then used Violate's body as a puppet to punish Aiacos, and he does not resist, preferring to die by her hand than die alone. However, she stops mid-blow and starts crying. He was amazed to see that even dead Violate was loyal to him. Then he admits he had profound bonds with her. He buries her body and accepts Bennu Kagaho's punishment. His Garuda Surplice is completely obliterated hence Aiacos is freed from the Masei (魔星; Demonic Stars). Kagaho states that from now on Aiacos is just a mere human, being given back his "human name", which is surprisingly revealed to be Suikyō (水鏡; Water mirror), a character also appearing in original author Masami Kurumada's Saint Seiya Next Dimension, who in the canonical continuity of which, is established as the former Crateris Silver Saint and Tenma's master.

==== Found only in Lost Canvas ====
===== Heavenly Savage Star, Bennu Kagaho =====
Voiced by: Jun Fukuyama (Japanese); Lucien Dodge (English)

Heavenly Savage Star, Bennu Kagaho (天暴星ベヌウの輝火, Tenbōsei Benuu no Kagaho) is one of the newly introduced Specters of Hades. Kagaho shows loneliness, sadism and rage in battle and determination. He has a rivalry with Libra Dohko., and memories of his dead younger brother Sui, who committed suicide because he felt he was a burden for Kagaho, who always ended up injured when protecting him. Kagaho is one of the most powerful Specters and also known as the fastest one, being able to fight against Gold Saints at the same level. His ability allows him to create black flames with his Cosmo. His ability with black flames are further revealed with Corona Blast (コロナブラスト, Korona Burasuto) in which Kagaho creates an enormous sphere of fire similar to a star, then shoots it at his opponent. Kagaho is also seen using this technique consecutively. His Crucify Ankh (クラシファイアンク, Kurashifai Anku) allows Kagaho to shoot many black fire stakes that enter into the body of the opponent and start burning him from the inside. Then the black fire binds the opponent until the body is destroyed. In his fight against Taurus Aldebaran, Kagaho is overpowered but the Gold Saint spares him saying that he didn't sense true evil in him. The fight also left him with his damaged Surplice, as only one wing remained. After the fight Kagaho seems to become more calm and even started to respect Aldebaran. He was also seen after the demise of Taurus briefly encountering Pegasus Tenma. Afterwards he received an upgrade in his surplice, and was sent to punish Garuda Aiacos for failing to keep the Saints at bay; it was hinted that Kagaho took on the role of Aiacos as a commander. He later reappears invading Sanctuary, preparing to extract Athena's blood from Dohko's veins, to revive the goddess' Cloth, as requested to him by Hades. Kagaho reveals that the eventual acquisition of Athena's blood was the reason for sparing Dohko's life. Triggering Athena's Cloth resurrection with Dohko's blood, the Specter snatches his reward, leaving Libra for dead. Kagaho is then stripped of Athena's Cloth by a moribund Dohko, much to his surprise. Bennu is prevented from pursuing him by Gemini Defteros using the technique Another Dimension to save Dohko's life.

Kagaho reappeared right after Alone slaughtered his Skeletons, standing in Pandora's path as she tried to go on a pursuit after Hades' vessel. Bennu revealed that he was aware that their god was Alone all the time, and that his loyalty towards him remained despite this. Challenged by Pandora, he surprisingly allowed her to pass, stating he understood her desire of wanting to be reunited with her younger brother. The Bennu Specter last appeared preparing to prevent Athena and her Saints trespassing the Third Demon Temple: Terra (第3 魔宮 地球, Dai san Makyū Tera), which was presented by an Ankh of black fire, in his words, the grave of his human feelings. Kagaho ensnared Regulus and Tenma with his Crucify Ankh, as well as Athena as she rushed to their aid. In the moment Kagaho was to take their lives, he was stopped by Libra Dohko. The Specter then prepared to engage Libra in battle to the end. After witnessing Dohko's upgrade in power because of having Athena's blood running through his veins, Bennu seeks to evaporate that blood from Libra's body, exhibiting a new technique, Rising Darkness (ライジングダークネス, Raijingu Dākunesu), which creates a small, black sun which raises the temperature similar to that of desert environments, dehydrating the victim. Bennu is then confronted by Dohko, who reveals he has seen the Specter's true nature, and intends to bring it back. Kagaho explodes in anger, brutally attacking Dohko. The Libra Saint learns about Kagaho's brother after colliding with the Ankh, and then stops Bennu's attack. Kagaho is held by Dohko as the latter prepares to use his final technique, which would send them both flying to die in outer space. As they both leave the stratosphere, Kagaho admires the Sun while listening to Dohko's reasoning, and brings back memories from his past when he lived with Sui. The Specter's Cosmo and flames then change color, and an aura similar to the Phoenix Bronze Cloth's wings appear behind him, while Kagaho realizes the truth and has a change of heart. Kagaho reminisces about his motivations and loyalty towards Alone. At last, Kagaho burn into the skies becoming a phoenix, vowing that, if given the chance, he will protect Alone and the Earth in another life. Kagaho also appears in Chapter Virgo of the Anecdotes series, years before the events of 1747.

===== Heavenly Wounded Star, Mandrake Fyodor =====
Voiced by: Kentarō Itō

Heavenly Wounded Star, Mandrake Fyodor (天傷星マンドレイクのヒョードル, Tenshōsei Mandoreiku no Hyōdoru) is an extremely sadistic Specter, who has his own torture chamber in the depths of Yomotsu Hirasaka (黄泉比良坂), the Hill to the Land of Spirits. He held Tenma captive until the Pegasus Saint was rescued by Yato and Yuzuriha, and then was slain by his former prisoner. Later he was resurrected by Hades. Fyodor is one of the Specters introduced in Lost Canvas manga.

Attacks: Strangle Shrill (ストラングルシュリール, Sutoranguru Shurīru): From the mask carved on his Surplice, Fyodor launches an extremely acute shriek similar to that of a mandrake, paralyzing and injuring anything in its way.

===== Heavenly Clever Star, Necromancer Byaku =====
Voiced by: Wataru Hatano (Japanese); Doug Erholtz (English)

Heavenly Clever Star, Necromancer Byaku (天霊星ネクロマンサーのビャク, Tenreisei Nekuromansā no Byaku), the lieutenant commander of Minos' troops, he discovers the trap that Albafica prepared for the Specters, but even so is killed by the white rose. Later, he is resurrected by Hades' powers to be annihilated by Aldebaran's Great Horn, finally being sealed by the 108 counts Mala. Byaku is one of the Specters introduced in Lost Canvas manga.

===== Heavenly Piercing Star, Nasu Veronica =====
Voiced by: Takehito Koyasu (Japanese); Tony Oliver (English)

Heavenly Piercing Star, Nasu Veronica (天究星ナスのベロニカ, Tenkyūsei Nasu no Beronika) is one of the most potent Specters alongside Bennu Kagaho, and also the most monstrous ever appeared. The one behind the hideous illusions and creatures that roamed the forest in which Tenma, Yato and Yuzuriha had entered, he was introduced as an androgynous nun reciting Psalm 23 in a church. He is able to spit countless, destructive flies, call forth the dead and create insects and slimes of enormous proportions. With Burial Fort (ブライアル・フォート, Buraiaru Fōto) Veronica can summon massive amounts of a jelly-like, exceptionally caustic substance, that he uses to melt anything on his path. Veronica's soul is destroyed by Cancer Manigoldo. He is able to launch one last assault however, as Thanatos uses his decaying body to channel part of his power and attack Manigoldo.

===== Heavenly Retreating Star, Genbu Gregor =====
Voiced by: Nobuaki Kanemitsu

Heavenly Retreating Star, Genbu Gregor (天退星玄武のグレゴー, Tentaisei Genbu no Guregō), a gigantic Lost Canvas-only Specter who claimed that his Surplice was harder than diamond. Defeated by the Capricorn Gold Saint, El Cid, by using his sacred Sword Excalibur.

===== Heavenly Lonely Star, Behemoth Violate =====
Voiced by: Takako Honda (Japanese); Cindy Robinson (English)

Heavenly Lonely Star, Behemoth Violate (天孤星ベヒーモスのバイオレート, Tenkosei Behīmosu no Baiorēto) is the "shadow" within Alone's shadow that guards him. This Specter has the ability to blend completely into darkness, as she presents herself gushing out from her master's shadow and challenging Taurus Aldebaran, proving she is able to fight equally at Taurus' strength. She is also able to see through the shadows of others as seen later in the storyline, when she is depicted kneeling before Garuda Aiacos, as his right arm. Here she showed to be quite merciless, as she remained indifferent while splattered with blood and viscera when Aiacos slaughtered a nearby rebel Skeleton and a damned soul. Soon after, she was sent flying by Aiacos' Garuda Flap, withstanding its force and using it as a means to assault the Saints, freezing most of them with her mere presence, where she presented her first technique the Brutal Real (ブルータルリアル, Burūtaru Riaru), a titanic stomp which destroys completely the ground below Violate. She was stopped by Leo Regulus, whom she engaged in battle. Violate's apparent physical power was confirmed when she lifted bare-handed the whole ship that the Saints were repairing. Violate manages to crush the Leo Gold Cloth's fist, and paralyzes the Gold Saint embracing his body with a huge shadow, a technique called Shadow Sewing (影ぬい, Kagenui). When Regulus manages to see through her ability, it is explained that she merges the dead from the 8th prison of Hell into the shadow so they can grab the enemy to stop their movement. She is killed by Leo Regulus' Lightning Plasma after he used his superior Cosmo to make Violate lose her influence over the dead. She reappeared some time later trying to attack Aiacos, although she stopped her blow before even hitting him; later it was revealed that it was Hades who controlled the dead body of Violate. Violate is another exclusive character from Lost Canvas manga. On a side note, Behemoth Violate was the only female Specter to be featured in Lost Canvas for some time, although she isn't the only one, as author Masami Kurumada created Acheron Nyan and Papillon Giulietta, female Specters for Saint Seiya: Next Dimension. Also, Teshirogi mentions in her notes to the Lost Canvas anime staff, included in the Season 2 DVDs, that "she loves (Violate's) real name, Violet".

===== Heavenly Skillful Star, Hanuman Tokusa =====
Voiced by: Miyu Irino

Heavenly Skillful Star, Hanuman Tokusa (天巧星ハヌマーンのトクサ, Tenkōsei Hanumān no Tokusa) is Silver Saint Crane Yuzuriha's younger brother. His background is revealed in detail in the Lost Canvas derivative story Yuzuriha's Tale. His soul was awakened as one of the 108 Specters by Thanatos, hence becoming one of them. Eternal life was bestowed upon him as reward, under the condition of killing his loved ones to attain it. He was capable of summoning destructive spiritual energies with his attack Praesepe Departed Soul Summoning (積尸気如意霊臨, Sekishiki Nyoi Reirin). Killed by Aries Shion.

===== Earthly Beast Star, Cait Sith Cheshire =====
Voiced by: Sōichirō Hoshi (Japanese); Bryce Papenbrook (English)

Earthly Beast Star, Cait Sith Cheshire (地獣星ケット・シーのチェシャ, Chijūsei Ketto Shī no Chesha) is somewhat of a comic relief character, acting more like a servant than a combatant, as he's seen riding Pandora's carriage and guiding the Specter that invaded Jamir. His mannerisms are depicted in the stereotypical feline behavior common in manga comics and anime. He escorted Pandora in her quest to punish Alone, and didn't exhibit any abilities or intention to fight. Reminiscing about their encounter in Jamir, Cheshire prepares to engage Tenma in battle, which never comes to pass as the groups separate. After Rhadamanthys' death, Cheshire is taken by Athena, and witness the petrified Saints and soldiers come back to life by the goddess' intervention. After Hades' defeat and having never taken part in any battle or exhibited any ability, Cheshire last appears, no longer a Specter, escorting Pandora at her arrival to Heinstein Castle, remaining as her loyal servant. Although Cheshire displayed no techniques during the course of the Lost Canvas comics, Teshirogi's notes to the Lost Canvas anime staff, included in the DVD home release of the anime, revealed the names of his attacks: Hide and Seek (Hide and Seek) and Perky Party (パーキーパーティ, Pākī Pāti).

===== Earthly Searching Star, Bat Wimber =====
Voiced by: Tōru Nara (Japanese); Todd Haberkorn (English)

Earthly Searching Star, Bat Wimber (地察星バットのウィンバー, Chisatsusei Batto no Winbā) is an assassin sent to Greece by Pandora, ordered to kill Pegasus Tenma. He showed bat-like abilities and attributes, such as staying upside-down under a rock cliff, the taste for blood, having extremely sharp teeth, and being able to control bats. He is able to injure Taurus Aldebaran, but is overwhelmed and killed by the Saint's strength. One of the new Specters introduced in Lost Canvas.

Attacks: Nightmare Sonar (ナイトメアソナー, Naitomea Sonā): Wimber calls forth massive numbers of bats, which unleash ultrasonic waves that brings the opponent into a deep slumber. It appears that these waves affect only the victims' hearing, as Aldebaran is able to repel their effect by puncturing his eardrums.

===== Earthly Flying Star, Sylph Edward =====
Voiced by: Yasuyuki Kase (Japanese); Grant George (English)

Earthly Flying Star, Sylph Edward (地飛星シルフのエトヴァルト, Chihisei Shirufu no Etovaruto), a low-level Specter that resurrected several times to confront Tenma and Asmita in Jamir. With the creation of the 108 beads Mala, his soul is trapped into one of the beads, making it impossible to resurrect again. Only present in Lost Canvas.

===== Heavenly Standing Star, Dryad Luco =====
Heavenly Standing Star, Dryad Luco (天立星ドリュアスのルコ, Tenritsusei Doryuasu no Ruko) is a Specter that was first introduced in the limited The Lost Canvas CD Drama, with his background further explored in the Anecdotes: Chapter Pisces short story. The Specter physically resembles Pisces Lugonis, Albafica's master, as the latter was Luco's older brother. Luco sought to relieve his brother from the curse of his poisonous blood, but was unable to as Lugonis died in the Red Bond ritual, thus Luco now seeks to heal Albafica. Later on, the boy Pefko reveals to Albafica the true reason behind his trek to Sanctuary: Luco is no longer the kind master he knew and is secretly concocting herb brews from the Underworld that transform people into servants of Hades. Realizing Pefko's betrayal, Luco reveals himself as the Dryad Specter to Albafica. Once a gifted Healer himself, when confronted by Albafica, it is revealed that he is immune to his poison due to his white lily field. In the CD Drama, his attack is named Earth of Lily (アース・オブ・リリイ, Āsu obu Ririi). In Chapter: Pisces, Luco is shown to have control over nature ("trees, herbs and flowers", in the Specter's words), claiming that everything is part of him as a Dryad, and he is able to take over Albafica's roses, drastically enlarge their thorns and manipulate them against the Gold Saint with his technique Curse of Lily (カース・オブ・リリイ, Kāsu obu Ririi). He was later killed by Albafica's Crimson Thorn technique.

===== Earthly Repose Star, Kagebōshi Silhouette =====
Earthly Repose Star, Kagebōshi Silhouette (地鎮星 影法師のシルエット, Chichinsei Kagebōshi no Shiruetto) is one of the specters in the army of Hades who appeared in The Lost Canvas manga. His formal introduction was in Anecdotes (chapter 54, in Gaiden 8). Kageboshi roams the underworld in search of souls who somehow managed to maintain consciousness after death, and recruit them to the Underworld army serving Hades. Silhouette has a brief confrontation with Asmita when the latter saves a close friend while he was being tortured by Skeletons. After defeating them Silhouette attacks Asmita but unable to defeat the Saint, he ends up running the same fate as his subordinates. His technique Shadow Pacifier (影降伏, Kage Kōfuku) it is an ability in which Silhouette throws ten vajra with great speed and force towards the enemy from his Surplice. The effects of this technique are unknown, since Asmita managed to break the technique with his Demon Pacifier technique, killing the Specter before the technique takes effect against the Virgo Saint.

===== Earthly Leader Star, Atavaka Acala =====
Earthly Leader Star, Atavaka Acala (地魁星アタバクの不動明王, Chikaisei Atabaku no Fudōmyoō) a singular Specter, who enjoys a special position among the 108 Demonic Stars of Hades' Army, and thus he is not subjected to Pandora's authority. The Earthly Repose Star's Specter was one of his subjects, as he rules in the hellish Six Realms of afterlife, that he considers his "gardens". He enslaves souls to do his bidding, such as in his technique Demonic Ultimate Law of Nothingness (魔天無宝輪, Matenmu Hōrin), a distorted version of Asmita's The Treasures of Heavens technique, with which Āṭavaka tries to murder the Virgo Gold Saint during their final duel, but ultimately fails and dies.

===== Heavenly Wounding Star, Cetus Chris =====
Heavenly Wounding Star, Cetus Chris (天損星ケートスのクリス, Tensonsei Kētosu no Kurisu) is the heir to his family's fortune. Because of his sister plot against his life by a Specter, the young heir is forced to seek help from Sanctuary. Subsequent inheritance hidden from Walden Family celestial star Pain wakes and becomes the girl in one of the 108 spectra Army of Hades, god of Hell. Chris is the daughter of a noble family. She is quiet unlike her older brothers. According to Leibold, Chris and Ursula used to be very close. After the death of her uncle and the disappearance of her older brother, Chris was chosen by her father as heir to the family. One day she is poisoned by her own father, and with the help of an attendant, cuts and burns Chris' back with the intention of stealing the Cetus Surplice that is hidden inside her body.

===== Heavenly Long-lived Star, Vampire Earheart =====
Heavenly Long-lived Star, Vampire Earheart (天寿星ヴァンパイのアエアハート, Tenjūsei Banpaia no Eahāto) a Specter from Hades' ranks. Earheart makes his first cameo besides Ursula and a group of warriors when Ursula managed to find her younger sister who had met with a Gold Saint, Appearing again Ursula addresses the boat and after having a brief chat with Aspros, the Gold Saint asks her to hurry and call up her demon to defeat him quickly so he can get back to the sanctuary, after Ursula says the devil is already there and not even Aspros was aware of his presence, Earheartn appears in the back of the Gold Saint, however with no plans to fight Earhart against Aspros, believing that it is better to wait until the beginning of the holy war as the conflict in which they were involved was merely a dispute of the Walden Family.Aspros replied that although he would like to return to the sanctuary as quickly as possible his own honor as a warrior called to successfully fulfill its mission, Opening a rift in space absorbing Earheart along with the ship and those in it. The specter proclaims the breakdown of negotiations and states that he had also considered the idea to remove the boat from the Sanctuary. In an unknown location, Ursula and Earhart are directed towards an elegant living room, she tells him that Aspros was an interesting man and asked the Spectre if the Gold Saint had died, Earhart said he doubted it as all of the Saints are stubborns, this reminds him that their role is to harness financial power and military strength of the Walden family as it was for that reason that he gave his help, Ursula replies that he shouldn't forget that.

===== Earthly Karmic Star, Upyr Raybould =====
Earthly Karmic Star, Upyr Raybould (地因星ウプイリーのレイボールド, Chiinsei Upuirī no Reibōrudo) a Specter from Hades' ranks, subordinate to Vampire Earheart.

===== Heavenly Chief Star, Mephistopheles Yoma =====
Heavenly Chief Star, Mephistopheles Yoma (天魁星メフィストフェレスの杳馬, Tenkaisei Mefisutoferesu no Yōma), appears before Gemini Aspros, to thwart his attempt on Alone's life. Referred to as "the father of my rival" by Alone, and bearing a physical resemblance to Tenma, it has been revealed that Yōma is the father of the Pegasus Saint, who is known as the only man who has hurt Hades' body since the ages of myth. In the same vein as the Shakespearian proverbial phrase, Yoma compares life to a stage play. It was also revealed, that it was Yoma who planted the seeds of evil in Aspros' heart during his time as Saint apprentice, spawning the conflict between the twins and Aspros' evil aspirations in the past. Years later, Yoma engages Aspros in battle, ensnaring him within his technique Marvelous Room (マーベラスルーム, Māberasu Rūmu), a vortex in time and space, capable of dissolving the enemy into quantum particles. Afterwards, Yoma leaves to challenge his son, whom he spots as the latter reaches the place Yoma is probably in charge to protect, the first Demon Temple (Mercury), along with Shion and Regulus. Yoma projects a vision in Tenma's mind, showing him the distant past, during his days as a newborn, surrounded by his mother Partita, his father and a young Pandora. Much to his surprise, Tenma refuses to acknowledge Yoma as his father, mentioning he died years ago. Yoma continues reminiscing about the past, revealing his Japanese origins and his embracing of his destiny as one of the 108 Demonic Stars. Yoma also reveals that Hades' soul was born from Pandora's mother during a snowy night, and that he ran away that night to escape the twin gods and find Hades' chosen vessel, by disguising himself as a priest. Furthermore, Yoma relishes toying with Athena and Tenma's psyche, to force them to question their roles in their current incarnation. Afterward, he leaves Tenma alone as he rejoins Hades. He later resurfaces during Athena and Pandora's encounter revealing Partita alive, and revels in the latter's apparent murder of Pandora. He then engulfs Tenma in a whirlwind, transporting him to the next Demon Temple, to engage Partita as a Specter, in battle.

He resurfaced witnessing the encounter of Leo Regulus and the Wyvern Specter. After a brief disappearance, Yoma encounters Aries Shion after Athena regains her divine power. The Specter is then challenged by his son Tenma to a battle to the death. He shows Tenma and Shion a vision of the future Pegasus Saint, Seiya. Vowing to kill Shion so the future will change, he uses the Marvelous Room on the Aries Saint, only to be challenged by a returning Aspros, who hurls himself and the Specter into an alternate time dimension. Seeking to kill Aspros, Yoma assaults him with his Rewind Bio (リワインドバイオ, Riwaindo Baio) technique, which sends his victim to a moment back in time prior to their birth. Having been revived as a Specter by Hades, Aspros returns as such, unscathed by Yōma's attack. During their battle, Yōma finally reveals his true identity, calling himself the reincarnation of Kairos (カイロス, Kairosu), lesser god and younger brother of the mighty god of time Chronos, who banished him in the ages of myth, and towards whom he bears a grudge. Yoma engages the Saint in battle and immobilizes him. As Yoma prepared to inflict a killing stroke on Aspros, the Gemini Gold Cloth protects him, summoned by Defteros' soul. Afterward, Yōma reveals his plans about stealing the God Cloth and use it to kill his brother Chronos and rule over Olympus, making his name feared in heavens and earth. Yoma then realizes he revealed his plans after suffering the effects of Aspros' Dellusional Fist, who inflicted it in a brief moment of carelessness by the god, forcing him to reveal his goals and his weakness, which is that Yoma's body is merely human and as such can be killed, thus Aspros prepares to seal Yoma's soul within the 108 beads mala. Enraged by Aspros' defiance, Yōma ensnares him within his Real Marvelous (リアルマーベラス, Riaru Māberasu) technique, a powerful vortex which strikes Aspros' body with great violence. Surviving against all odds, Aspros traps Yōma with the mala and opens the gateway to the Heavenly Realm, which destroys the Specter's body as well as severely injuring Aspros. Having vaporized completely, Yōma's soul is then sealed within the 108 beads mala for eternity. Tenma experiences then a last glimpse of his father's soul, sealed within one of the beads of the mala, eternally sleeping embraced by his wife Partita, having finally found peace, at long last.

==== Original Specters ====
===== Earthly Shadowy Star, Dullahan Cube =====
Voiced by: Norihisa Mori

Earthly Shadowy Star, Dullahan Cube (地陰星デュラハンのキューブ, Chiinsei Dyurahan no Kyūbu) was first seen among the group of Specters that attacked Alone and Tenma's village in Italy and, along with Bat Wimber, he is one of the assassins that Pandora sends to the Sanctuary in order to kill Pegasus Tenma. He is almost done with his task, but is stopped by Taurus Aldebaran while delivering the finishing blow. Nevertheless, he is the one who kills the Taurus Saint, albeit he is slain soon after by the Titan's Nova. Also one of the Specters found in the original manga.

Attacks: Death Messenger (デス・メッセンジャー, Desu Messenjā): With this technique, a beheaded young woman carrying her own head in her arms appears, singing an incomprehensible litany that is always heard whether the listener is deaf or not, and stops his heart, killing him instantly.

===== Heavenly Sinner Star, Lycaon Phlegyas =====
Voiced by: Masayuki Katō

Heavenly Sinner Star, Lycaon Phlegyas (天罪星リュカオンのフレギアス, Tenzaisei Ryukaon no Furegiasu) is resurrected once again in the 18th century along all the 108 Demon Stars, and wreaks havoc in Tenma's birth village in Italy. He is engaged by Pegasus Tenma and finally killed after a short battle. Later he was resurrected by Hades

Attacks: Howling Inferno (ハウリングインフェルノ, Hauringu Inferuno): Two powerful bursts of Cosmo are shot in unison, thus making Phlegyas able to slay two opponents at the same time.

===== Heavenly Hideous Star, Deadly Beetle Stand =====
Voiced by: Tomoyuki Shimura

Heavenly Hideous Star, Deadly Beetle Stand (天醜星デッドリービートルのスタンド, Tenshūsei Deddorī Bītoru no Sutando) is probably the biggest Specter, a towering giant twice the size of Unicorn Yato, whom he fought briefly inside Yomotsuhirasaka, but was unable to defeat him when the Saint was called back into the world of the living. Later, he appears in Jamir amongst other Specters during the fight between Behemoth Violate and Leo Regulus, where he resumes his fight against Yato by strangling him. Killed mercilessly by Garuda Aiacos. Also one of the Specters present in Masami Kurumada's original manga.

Attacks: Stand by Me (スタンド・バイ・ミー, Sutando Bai Mī): Similar to a wrestling hold, this move brings Stand to hold his opponent and then crushes him with his own weight.

===== Earthly Barbarous Star, Cyclops Gigant =====
Earthly Barbarous Star, Cyclops Gigant (地暴星サイクロプスのギガント, Chibōsei Saikuropusu no Giganto) has a brief appearance, being easily killed by Libra Dohko in Italy. Later he was resurrected by Hades.

===== Earthly Hiding Star, Worm Raimi =====
Voiced by: Atsushi Imaruoka

Earthly Hiding Star, Worm Raimi (地伏星ワームのライミ, Chifukusei Wāmu no Raimi) is the first Specter who tried a direct attack on Sasha, only to be stopped by Tenma, and then killed by Aries Shion. Although he is identical in appearance, personality, technique, Surplice and destined star to Kurumada's original character, he is never called by name in Lost Canvas, as he introduces himself as the Worm Specter. The omission of his name is corrected in the anime adaptation.

Attacks: Worm's Bind (ワームズバインド, Wāmuzu Baindo): Using the many tendrils that sprout from his Surplice, Raimi binds and strangulates his opponent to death.

===== Earthly Darkness Star, Deep Niobe =====
Voiced by: Takashi Matsuyama

Earthly Darkness Star, Deep Niobe (地暗星ディープのニオベ, Chiansei Dīpu no Niobe) followed Griffon Minos in his invasion of the Sanctuary (he was part of Wyvern Rhadamanthys' legions). Confident of his immunity to poisons, he challenges Pisces Albafica and used the Deep Fragrance (ディープフレグランス, Dīpu Fureguransu), a perfumed poisonous pheromone with which upon contact organic matter rots, but Albafica easily survives it and kills him by using his venomous blood.

===== Earthly Strange Star, Frog Xeros =====
Earthly Strange Star, Frog Xeros (地奇星フログのゼーロス, Chikisei Furogu no Zērosu), a Specter of ridiculous appearance and behavior, and perhaps just a comic relief character. He appeared briefly after Taurus Aldebaran was killed, laughing maniacally and beating the body of the dead Saint. Soon after, Bennu Kagaho appeared and defeated him. He is last seen as a prisoner in the Scorpio Temple where he was apparently killed by Kardia.

===== Heavenly Beast Star, Sphinx Pharaoh =====
Heavenly Beast Star, Sphinx Pharaoh (天獣星スフィンクスのファラオ, Tenjūsei Sufinkusu no Farao) is the Gate Keeper of Lost Canvas. He first appears testing Rhadamanthys' loyalty towards Hades, later he is seen in the entrance of the Lost Canvas removing the hearts of soldiers and unknown Saints. His attack is the Balance of Curse (バランス・オブ・カース, Baransu obu Kāsu), a tune from his diabolical harp which removes the enemy's heart and puts it on an ancient balance. If the weight of the heart (measured by individual purity) is the same as the Feather of Maat, than the opponent continues alive, otherwise he is killed. Sisyphos managed to overcome Pharaoh's technique and exterminate the Specter, however, before his death Pharaoh put a curse into the gates, that only a Big Bang would destroy the entrance to the Lost Canvas.

===== Heavenly Secret Star, Acheron Charon =====
Heavenly Secret Star, Acheron Charon (天間星アケローンのカロン, Tenkansei Akerōn no Karon) is the ferryboat of Hades' domain. He appeared rowing his boat through the sea of clouds, singing aboard of the Ship of Hope, where he is enchanted by the beauty of Yuzuriha and how she would make a nice souvenir to sell. Confronted by Tenma he uses his Rolling Oar (ローリング・オール, Rōringu Ōru), with which he spins his oar multiple times to destroy the enemy, he stops upon Shion and Regulus' arrival, commenting that his life was more valuable than fighting two Gold Saints. He agreed to take Sasha, Regulus, Shion and Tenma to the entrance for the first temple of the Guardians of Stars (星の守り人, Hoshi no Moribito), explaining that they were the most powerful warriors of Hades. During the sailing, he tricks Sasha by asking her hair as payment to the crossing, with which he sealed her powers as Athena. Killed by Aries Shion.

===== Heavenly Swift Star, Basilisk Sylphid =====
Heavenly Swift Star, Basilisk Sylphid (天捷星バジリスクのシルフィード, Tenshōsei Bajirisuku no Shirufīdo) is portrayed in a similar way to his original counterpart: An exceptionally powerful soldier of Hades' army, wielder of the power of the Basilisk's venom, and a member of Wyvern Rhadamanthys' elite Specters squad. He is first introduced into the plot of Lost Canvas trying to restrain and calm down a rage-driven Rhadamanthys, in the Sixth Demon Temple: Saturnus (第6 魔宮サタヌス, Dai roku Makyū Satanusu). Afterward, he is sent by the Underworld commander to infiltrate Athena's Sanctuary in an extremely important mission. Sylphid is completely devoted to Rhadamanthys, the only man he never was able to defeat. Pandora disapproves of Sylphid's devotion, while Hades remains indifferent to it, as he knows it makes Sylphid one of the strongest Specters. Successfully invading Sanctuary and witnessing Alraune Queen's defeat at Dohko's hand, Sylphid reveals himself with a mild gust of Basilisk-poisoned wind, sensing divine blood in Libra's veins, and vows to kill him, as he considers him unworthy of sharing Rhadamanthys' condition of divine blood carrier. Sylphid engages Libra in a bloody battle, wounding him even more seriously with his lethal Annihilation Flap (アナイアレーションフラップ, Anaiarēshon Furappu), which spreads the deadly Basilisk's venom, also known as Poisonous Winds (毒の風, Doku no Kaze), through the wings of the Basilisk Surplice. Against all odds, Dohko survives, much to Sylphid's surprise, and reminisces about Pisces Albafica's similar technique. Having both gone the distance in bloody combat, and embracing in a final effort, Sylphid finally dies a victim of Dohko's powerful burst of Cosmo, realizing the warmth that humans can treasure within themselves.

===== Heavenly Weeping Star, Harpy Valentine =====
Heavenly Weeping Star, Harpy Valentine (天哭星ハーピーのバレンタイン, Tenkokusei Hāpī no Barentain) was first featured in Lost Canvas in cameos. He was introduced formally into the storyline by being summoned by the fierce judge of the Underworld, Wyvern Rhadamanthys, to whom he shows undying loyalty. Valentine is also one of the exceptionally powerful soldiers of Hades' army. Along with Basilisk Sylphid, he is part of the elite of the Specters, and also a member of Rhadamanthys forefront squad. He is sent by the Underworld commander in his stead, acting as Rhadamanthys' substitute, in an important mission to Sanctuary. Instead, Valentine stays at the Saturnus Temple, guarding it meanwhile Rhadamanthys suffers excruciating pain as effect of Alone's blood. Pandora meets with him, wishing to enter the Temple. Valentine refuses, to prevent further loss of face for his commander, and is therefore challenged by the woman, who revels in the Specter's humiliation. He is subjected to torture by Pandora, and he reminisces about his past. Determined to never forsake his loyalty to his lord, and to punish Pandora for her slandering of the Wyvern Specter, Valentine retaliates with his Sweet Chocolate (スウィートショコラーテ, Suwīto Shokorāte) technique, listed in the Saint Seiya Encyclopedia, but never revealed by Masami Kurumada, which summons the spirits of the harpies, to absorb the lifeforce of the victim. Pandora manages to break free of the attack and vanquishes the Harpy Specter. After his lord Rhadamanthys resurfaces, all Valentine receives from him in return for his loyalty is cruel punishment for his defiance. Valentine then, in disbelief from his lord's reaction, prepares to kill Pandora. His attack is then deflected by Wyvern, who retaliates with his Greatest Caution technique. Valentine finally succumbs, as he desired, being a Specter until the very end. It was revealed, that ten years before these events, Valentine escorted Rhadamanthys on a mission to destroy a village, being then challenged by Taurus Rasgado.

===== Heavenly Devil Star, Alraune Queen =====
Heavenly Devil Star, Alraune Queen (天魔星アルラウネのクィーン, Tenmasei Aruraune no Kwīn) is one of the most powerful soldiers of Hades' army, responding directly only to Wyvern Rhadamanthys, and close comrade-in-arms of Minotauros Gordon. He is found by Libra Dohko in Sanctuary, in Athena's Chambers, on a mission to destroy the Cloth belonging to the goddess, during what he decapitated many of Athena's soldiers. After killing his partner Minotauros Gordon by means of kaishakunin assisted suicide, Queen attacks Dohko with his deadly Blood Flower Scissors (ブラッドフラウアシザーズ, Buraddo Furaua Shizāzu), a razor-sharp burst of Cosmo shaped as a Guillotine, severely injuring the Saint. Discovering the vial of Athena's blood concealed within the shield of Libra, Queen turns the tide of the battle destroying it. As he prepared to kill Dohko in revenge for Gordon, he discovers Athena's blood runs in the Saint's veins, and receives the full impact of Dohko's Lushan One Hundred Dragons Force.

===== Heavenly Gaol Star, Minotauros Gordon =====
Heavenly Gaol Star, Minotauros Gordon (天牢星ミノタウロスのゴードン, Tenrōsei Minotaurosu no Gōdon), is a direct subordinate to Wyvern Rhadamanthys, and wields extraordinary strength. He is featured in Lost Canvas, along fellow Specter Alraune Queen, who he considers a close partner, infiltrating Sanctuary, on a mission to destroy Athena's Cloth, until they are both discovered by the Libra Gold Saint. Knowing the power of the weapons of the Libra Cloth, Gordon recklessly challenges Dohko to wield any of the weapons of Libra. Enraged by Dohko's refusal to reveal the whereabouts of Athena's Cloth, Gordon attacks the Saint with his murderous Grand Axe Crusher (グランドアクスクラシャー, Gurando Akusu Kurashā), a titanic blast of his right arm that emulates the axe wielded by the Cretan Labyrinth's Minotaur; finally opening the gateway to Athena's statue. As he prepared to destroy Athena's statue and defile her temple, his right arm is severely injured by a Dragon made of pure Cosmo. Gordon then realizes Dohko has deemed that hour as a moment when the Arms of Libra must be wielded, to defend justice. Obsessed with destroying the weapons of Libra to make his Axe the strongest weapon, Gordon finds himself unable to. He is finally defeated by Dohko, who disables his arm and therefore his axe. He then dies decapitated by Alraune Queen.

===== Heavenly Wise Star, Balron René =====
Heavenly Wise Star, Balron René (天英星バルロンのルネ, Ten'eisei Baruron no Rune), appeared briefly behind Hades' shadow, among several high-ranking Specters. He was later confirmed as the guard of the second Demon Temple, Venus, and also functions as the tireless keeper of the records of people's lives. René greeted Athena, Regulus and Tenma with the painful embrace of his Fire Whip (ファイヤーウィップ, Faiyā Wippu), which was easily negated by Shion's Stardust Revolution, releasing them. He then welcomes the challenge of the Aries Saint, with whom he shares the past. Both shared a passion for knowledge of people's lives. René reminisces about Shion's and his master Hakurei's lives, going back 8 years prior, when Shion and René himself were candidates to obtain the supreme knowledge. Shion's change of heart back then caused René to bear a grudge against him. The Balron Specter tries to send Athena and her Saints to hell by destroying the floor beneath their feet with a powerful blast, but he is stopped by Shion's Crystal Wall, shaped as a barrier and a bridge, granting his comrades the opportunity to trespass the Venus Temple and proceed onward. René then is left alone with Shion to settle their arguments. By means of his Reincarnation (リーインカーネーション, Rīinkānēshon) technique, the Balron Specter torments Shion by facing his sins, preventing him from moving. The Specter toys with the Saint's psyche, forcing him to remember a time past, when he could have joined Balron in the quest for supreme knowledge, and the moment in which Shion seemingly chose to abandon his training as a Saint. Embracing the warm memories of his teacher Hakurei, Shion rejects Balron completely. Returning to the battle in the Venus Temple, Shion is crushed by the burden of his sins, the Specter prepares to send him to hell, suddenly realizing Shion has freed himself, thanks to his right arm being free of sin, because of the forgiveness he received from Hakurei through his blood. As Shion frees himself, René reveals the Balron Surplice to him and determines the proper punishment for the Saint, ensnaring him once again. René then deems Shion as one who has defied the gods, thus his place in eternity must be the Cocytus (氷結地獄, Kokyūtosu), the gelid prison of hell where those who arose against the gods are forever tormented. Shion refuses to become a prisoner of the Cocytus, and the anguish of his fellow Saints in torment, gives him the resolve to defeat the Balron Specter, who easily dodges Shion's Stardust Revolution by taking advantage of its flaws, as told by the sacred book he holds. Balron injures the Aries Saint even further by striking him with his whip, upon discovering the micro-fissures of the Aries Cloth, gravely wounding him. As Shion loses blood, he receives a vision of his master and the Saints of the future generations, encouraging him to defeat the Specter. Shion gathers strength and returns to the battle. In a last assault, Shion managed to use his master Hakurei's technique, Praesepe Returning Spirits Wave, channeling the strength of the Saints' souls in a murderous burst, negating Balron's defense, who was unable to find a way to escape in his book, since Shion never used this attack before and performed it empirically, thus completely destroying René with the energy blast conjured.

===== Earthly Lowly Star, Elf Mills =====
Earthly Lowly Star, Elf Mills (地劣星エルフのミルズ, Chiretsusei Erufu no Miruzu) appeared briefly behind Hades' shadow.

===== Earthly Walking Star, Gorgon Ochs =====
Earthly Walking Star, Gorgon Ochs (地走星ゴーゴンのオクス, Chisōsei Gōgon no Okusu) had a brief appearance behind Hades' shadow among the group of Specters that attacked Alone and Tenma's village in Italy.

===== Earthly Magic Star, Papillon Mew =====
Earthly Magic Star, Papillon Mew (地妖星パピヨンのミュー, Chiyōsei Papiyon no Myū), had a brief appearance behind Hades' shadow. Lost Canvas concluded without an active involvement of Papillon Mew inany event.

===== Heavenly Horned Star, Golem Rock =====
Heavenly Horned Star, Golem Rock (天角星ゴーレムのロック, Tenkakusei Gōremu no Rokku) was briefly featured in the shadows of Alone's awakening as Hades. In the anime adaptation, he also appeared as Hades' bodyguard in Italy, along with Troll Ivan. The Lost Canvas manga concluded without an active involvement of Rock in any event.

===== Heavenly Vanquished Star, Troll Ivan =====
Heavenly Vanquished Star, Troll Ivan (天敗星トロルのイワン, Tenpaisei Tororu no Iwan) appears briefly as Hades' bodyguard at the entrance of the Lost Canvas. In the anime adaptation, Ivan appeared as Hades' bodyguard in Italy. The Lost Canvas manga concluded without an active involvement of Ivan in any event.

==== Unnamed Specters ====
Although Hades' army consist of 108 evil stars, only a few of them were named or fought hand-to-hand with Athena's Saints. Most of these Specters are found only in Lost Canvas, although Teshirogi used some from Kurumada's original manga. Many were only featured in mass-scenes. There is also some variation in appearances between the Lost Canvas manga and anime adaptation. The ones from the original manga are identified by their destiny stars.

===== Earthly Empty Star Specter =====
The Earthly Empty Star Specter (地空星の冥闘士, Chikūsei no Supekutā) is a member of Griffon Minos' cadre during the invasion of Sanctuary. He dies intoxicated by the poison of the funeral roses stairway.

===== Earthly Just Star Specter =====
The Earthly Just Star Specter (地理星の冥闘士, Chirisei no Supekutā) is a member of Griffon Minos' cadre during the invasion of Sanctuary, along with the Earthly Empty Star Specter. He also dies intoxicated by the poison of the funeral roses stairway.

===== Earthly Repose Star Specter =====
First introduced in a splash page in the first issues of The Lost Canvas, the Earthly Repose Star Specter (地鎮星の冥闘士（スペクター）, Jichinsei no Supekutā) appears in a more active role in the Anecdotes series, in the Virgo chapter, battling Virgo Asmita. He refers to himself as the Silhouette of the Earthly Repose Star (地鎮星の影法師士, Jichinsei no Kagebōshi) and reveals to be a servant of Āṭavaka. He tries to murder Asmita by means of his Shadow Pacifier (影降伏, Kage-kōfuku) technique, but the Gold Saint proves too strong for the Specter and is soon overpowered and killed.

==== Skeletons ====
Skeletons Rankless soldiers (雑兵スケルトン, Zōhyō Sukeruton) are the lowest ranking soldiers of Hades' army, the equivalents of Athena's rankless soldiers. Unlike them, the Skeletons wear weak versions of Surplices and are often armed with sickles, as they have no mastery over Cosmo. The Rankless soldier Skeleton Marchino (雑兵スケルトンのマルキーノ, Zōhyō Sukeruton no Marukīno), a comic relief character from Kurumada's original manga and the only Skeleton identified by name, was also featured in Lost Canvas trying to subdue Unicorn Yato in Mandrake Fyodor's torture chamber, and being subsequently defeated by Crane Yuzuriha.

== Others ==
Most of the following support characters exist only in The Lost Canvas, except where otherwise noted.

=== Owl Partita ===
Owl Partita (オウルのパルティータ, Ōru no Parutīta) Exclusive Lost Canvas character, and said to be neither Specter nor Saint, Owl Partita was in life, a young woman, servant of Pandora's family, wife of the Specter Mephistopheles Yōma and mother of Pegasus Tenma. She was abandoned by Yōma during Tenma's early childhood. The memory of holding her rough hand lies deep within Tenma's heart. She was killed by the Skeleton soldiers sent by Pandora. She is revealed by Yōma to have been revived by Hades, and gravely wounds Pandora in revenge for her murder. Partita is then introduced to Tenma wearing her armor, which resembled a Surplice, as guardian of the Uranus Demon Temple (天王星の魔宮, Tennō-sei no Makyū). She forces a reluctant Tenma to engage her in battle. Partita projects memories of her and Tenma's past in her sons' mind to further weaken his will, and vows to kill the Saint, as she considers him the greatest sinner against heavens, and states she needs the soul of her son to help her and her husband in the uprising of humans against the gods of Olympus, and breed a new mankind. Then she is surprised by Pandora, who survived her assault. Partita attacks Pandora with a powerful Cosmo burst, leaving her in a critical state. She then turns against her son, with a second attack, which is absorbed by Tenma to protect Pandora. Then, astonished, Partita witnesses her son's Pegasus Cloth acquire a golden hue. Her Surplice is partially shattered by Tenma, and in turn she manages to mostly destroy the revitalized Pegasus Cloth. She extracts Tenma's soul, which is then retrieved by the Saint. The soul then causes the Pegasus Cloth to resurrect as the Pegasus God Cloth. She and Tenma clash in a final effort, and she is mortally wounded. Before dying, she reminisces about her past in Olympus as the messenger of Athena, before both reincarnated as humans, and the night Yōma tried to kidnap Tenma. Truth is finally revealed that after her revival, she disguised herself as Hades' guardian to spur Tenma's full potential and bestow the Pegasus God Cloth on him through battle, thus fulfilling the promise she made as Athena's emissary.

=== Atla ===
Voiced by: Motoko Kumai (Japanese); Griffin Burns (English)

Atla (アトラ, Atora) is a young descendant of the people of Jamir. During all times, he stays with Hakurei until he is sent to the Sanctuary to inform that the Specters are being brought back to life by Hades. He is also tasked to teleport Athena's large army into Hades' territory, as Sisyphos states his telekinesis ability can overpower that of Hakurei's and Shion's.

=== Sea Dragon Unity ===
Sea Dragon Unity (海龍(シードラゴン)のユニティ, Shīdoragon no Yuniti) Unity, son of Garcia, brother of Seraphina. He is a Blue Warrior from the Bluegrad city in Siberia (the same which appeared in the short story of Hyōga, Nastassja of the Ice Lands Chapter (氷の国のナターシャ編, Kōri no Kuni no Natāsha Hen) contained in Kurumada's original Saint Seiya manga, tankōbon No. 13) and close friend to Aquarius Dégel. After joining briefly with Dégel and Kardia in order to awake the god Poseidon to plea for assistance to Athena, he is seemingly brutally killed by Rhadamanthys. However, he later reappears in front of Dégel as the Sea Dragon Mariner and schemed to use his sister's body as a vessel to release Poseidon and, with it, take over the world. As shown in a flashback, he was in despair about the apparent doom of Bluegrad, fated to eternally guard the spirit of Poseidon in the gelid lands and, one day, succumb to the coldness. After discovering the inner sanctum of the god, he viewed himself as chosen by Poseidon as he wore the Scale of Sea Dragon, thus becoming convinced to affirm Bluegrad's hegemony over the whole world. His father Garcia tried to reason with him, but was slaughtered by his own son. While depicted as brutal and power-hungry, Unity actually sought power after the death of his sister, brought by a simple illness they were unable to cure due to their isolation. This drove him into complete despair, so much that he sought the power of the sea god in order to transform Bluegrad in something even greater than Poseidon's own Atlantis. As the Sea Dragon Mariner, Unity uses Poseidon's power kept in Orichalcum. By using it, he can use the marine organism Coral to regenerate himself and he can freely control it to restrain and manipulate his enemies by invading their nervous system with it, he can also control inanimate objects. His direct attack is known as Holy Pillar (ホーリーピラー, Hōrī Pirā), in which he creates countless gigantic pillars or whirlpools to crush his enemies. Unity tried to turn Dégel into his ally, but fought against him when the latter refused. He is ultimately defeated and, apparently returned to his senses, acknowledging the folly of his ambitions. When he renounced his status as a Mariner, he lost his power, showing that said power was just borrowed, not his own. He remains an ally to Athena, sworn to protect his friend Dégel's and also Kardia's ideals.

=== Seraphina ===
Seraphina (セラフィナ, Serafina) Seraphina was the older sister of Unity who was close friend of him and Dégel when they were young. Some years later, she traveled the world looking for assistance for her country, but she became ill and died. Devastated by his sister's death, Unity decided to use her body as a vessel for Poseidon's soul so he could be free through her and make Bluegrad a prosperous place. Her body was possessed by Poseidon and manifested his powers despite not seeming to have a conscience. In order to stop Poseidon, Dégel locked himself alongside Seraphina and the city of Atlantis inside his ice.

=== Black Saints ===
- Black Altar Avido (暗黒祭壇星座(ブラックアルター)のアヴィド, Burakku Arutā no Avido) Avido is the Altar Black Saint as well as the Don (首領(ドン)) of the Nero organization, and former apprentice of Altar Hakurei. He has mastered the Praesepe combat technique, commonly associated with the Cancer Gold Saint, as proven by his usage of the Praesepe Demonic Blue Flames (積尸気鬼蒼焔, Sekishiki Kisōen) on Lumaca's spirit, he also is able to use the technique to destroy not only the soul but also the body of his victim. He was driven out of the Sanctuary by Hakurei once he surrendered to greed. Avido still bears a grudge against his former master and believes the Sanctuary to be unworthy of ruling the world, as they are devoid of desires.
- Black Whale Allegre (暗黒鯨星座(ブラックホエール)のアレグレ, Burakku Hoēru no Aregure) Alegre is a member of the Nero organization and enemy of Athena's Sanctuary, who secretly conspires to kill Cancer Manigoldo and Pisces Albafica, to steal their Gold Cloths. A priest corrupted by the delights of the flesh, he believes that people get closer to God when they follow their instinctive wishes. No longer hiding his true identity to Cancer Manigoldo and Pisces Albafica, he reveals himself as Black Whale Alegre, a Black Saint able to sense Manigoldo's mastery of the Praesepe arts. His technique Holy Spout (ホーリースパウト, Hōrī Supauto) allows him to purify and release spirits, and therefore renders him immune to Praesepe attacks, while the Will Baritsu (ウィイルバリツ, Wīru Baritsu) is a powerful offensive that crushes the opponent. Manigoldo is still able to fight and kill the Black Saint with his physical attack Acubens. His Black Cloth is the counterpart for Mozes Whale Silver Cloth. His Black Cloth appeared briefly in a panel in Kurumada's manga.
- Black Heracles Laimargos (暗黒ヘラクレス星座のレマルゴス, Burakku Herakuresu no Remarugosu) Laimargos is a member of the Nero organization and enemy of Athena's Sanctuary, who expresses disdain towards Lumaca. He secretly conspires to kill Cancer Manigoldo and Pisces Albafica, to steal their Gold Cloths. Laimargos is also secretly a Black Saint. He was killed by the Roses of Albafica. Laimargos Black Cloth is a counterpart to Heracles Algethi's Silver Cloth.
- Black Crow Rusé (暗黒烏星座(ブラッククロウ)のリュゼ, Burakku Kurou no Ryuze) Rusé is also a member of the Nero and enemy of Athena's Sanctuary. Rusé introduces himself as Black Crow Rusé, revealing his allegiance, and considering his beauty even greater than Pisces Albafica's, he engages him in combat, easily negating the Gold Saint's attack by means of his Black Feather Defense (ブラックフェザーディフェンス, Burakku Fezā Difensu) technique, and also through his command over crows. He secretly conspires to kill Cancer Manigoldo and Albafica, to steal their Gold Cloths. Rusé is later killed by Avido as punishment for his failure to defeat Pisces Albafica. Rusé's Black Cloth is a counterpart to Crow Jamian's Silver Cloth.
- Black Hound Yudo (暗黒猟犬星座(ブラックハウンド)のユド, Burakku Haundo no Yudo) Yudo is also a member of the Nero and enemy of Athena's Sanctuary, conspiring to kill Cancer Manigoldo and Albafica in order to steal their Gold Cloths. He mastered the Satori technique, which allows him to read minds. He reveals himself to Gioca as Black Hound Yudo, and claims to be the one who slaughtered her family, the guardians of Death Queen Island, years ago. This allowed the group to escape, but the other Black Saints remain trapped as long as the Rangda mask exists - as only a member of the guardian clan is able to destroy it, he tries to goad Gioca into doing it. He was killed by the Bloody Rose of Pisces Albafica. His Black Cloth is a counterpart to Hound Asterion's Silver Cloth.

=== Support characters ===
- Appendix Kiki (アッペンデックスの貴鬼, Appendekkusu no Kiki) Kiki, Saint apprentice under Aries Mu, appears briefly in The Lost Canvas epilogue, along his master during a visit to Libra Rōshi in the Lushan waterfalls.
- Sanctuary Soldiers: Sanctuary soldiers are the lowest ranking members of Athena's army. They wear no Cloth and have no mastery over Cosmo. They can be counted by the hundreds and are subordinated to the Saints. Although they have no superhuman abilities, their devotion and love for Athena is as fierce as the Saints'. A small unit of them accompanied a group of Saints led by goddess Athena, Aries Shion, Leo Regulus and Sagittarius Sisyphos into the Lost Canvas aboard the Ship of Hope.
- Hell's Watchdog Cerberus (地獄の番犬 ケルベロス, Jigoku no Banken Keruberosu) Cerberus, an enormous, three headed canid demonic creature, appears occasionally at its master Hades' side, also serving him as his mount. It is featured more prominently in the anime adaptation, in which it attacks Unicorn Yato, Crane Yuzuriha and Pegasus Tenma during their return from Yomotsu Hirasaka. Defeated twice by Tenma, but temporarily. Although it is depicted in a similar way to Kurumada's original design, in The Lost Canvas Cerberus' heads are more realistically represented.
- The old master (老師, Sensei) The old master is Libra Dohko's mentor, who taught him the ways of the Saints in Lushan. He is revealed to be 1000 years old, and was consumed by the pain of losing his loved one during his youth, leading him to become a being who discarded his humanity. By doing that he turned into an inhuman form, a dragon.
- Sui (翠, Sui) Sui was Kagaho's younger brother, who considered himself a burden for his sibling. Sui committed suicide many years ago to relieve his brother of the burden. His death had an enormous impact on Kagaho's behavior and way of thinking. As noted by Libra Dohko, Sui bore a striking resemblance to Alone.
- Saint apprentices and subordinates Voiced by: Yoshimitsu Shimoyama (Tsubaki), Takuya Sato (Rusk), Tsubasa Takanohashi (Lacaille) Several aspirants to the status of Saint of Athena are featured in Lost Canvas in supporting roles. Also, several Saints appear as subordinates to higher-ranking Saints, among them two Silver Saints and one Bronze Saint, subordinated to Capricorn El Cid: the Silver Saints Vela Tsubaki (帆座(ヴェラ)のツバキ, Vera no Tsubaki), Puppis Lacaille (船尾座(パピス)のラカーユ, Papisu no Rakāyu) and the Bronze Saint Pyxis Rusk (羅針盤座(ピクシス)のラスク, Pikushisu no Rasuku), whose names and constellations were revealed first in the anime adaptation, they challenge Oneiros in a joint-attack called Howling Argo (ハウリングアルゴ, Hauringu Arugo) a powerful stream that explodes on contact, however they were killed by the God's Guardian's Oracle. Plus an additional Saint apprentice under El Cid called Paquia (パキア, Pakia). Among the aspirants, Salo (サロ, Saro), Teneo (テネオ, Teneo) and Celintha (セリンサ, Serinsa), apprentices of Taurus Aldebaran, who were saved by the Gold Saint and chose him as their teacher. After Aldebaran's demise, Celintha, quitting her training as Saint, mentions that Teneo will be his successor (Teneo appears wearing the Taurus Gold Cloth in one of Teshirogi's additional images in one of the manga volumes). Salo was killed by Hades. Two subordinates to the Crow Saint, named Shō (ショウ, Shou) and Gangsa (ガンサ, Gansa), appeared briefly before dying swallowed by the Lost Canvas. Teneo makes a final appearance as a survivor of the Holy War, returning to Sanctuary, to complete his training as a Saint and help Pope Shion in the rebuilding of Sanctuary.
- Agacia (アガシャ, Agasha): Voiced by: Kana Asumi Agacia is the young girl from Rodorio village, who is protected by Pisces Albafica. She once encountered him during a storm, while she was delivering flowers for her father. The Gold Saint kept a distance from the girl, in a display of sensibility she mistook for arrogance. However, she later discovers that Albafica kept himself away from everyone due to his venomous blood. Although she appeared both in the manga and the anime adaptation, her name was only revealed in the latter.
- Anna, Maria and Caro (アンナ、マリアとカロ, Anna, Maria to Karo): Voiced by: Risa Shimizu, Yūmi Kikuchi and Noriko Shitaya respectively. Anna, Maria, and Caro were three young children, who grew up in the same orphanage as Tenma, who held them close to his heart. They were killed by Alone after drawing their portraits.
- Mi-jong (ミジョン, Mijon) Mi-jong is Unicorn Yato's elder sister. Bed-ridden, she predicted Hades' return during her fever dreams, forcing Yato to seek medical attention for her. During their trek, both are saved from a Specter by Scorpio Kardia, who then takes Yato to Sanctuary to train as a Saint. Mi-jong appears only in the Lost Canvas anime adaptation.

== See also ==
- List of Saint Seiya characters
