= Tsukitatsufunado =

Japanese deity

Tsukitatsufunado (衝立船戸神), also known as Funadosae (来名戸祖神), is a god of crossroads and boundaries in Japanese mythology.

After Izanagi reached the border known as Yomotsu Hirasaka during his escape from Yomi, he blocked the path with a huge boulder and travelled to near Awagihara by the Tachibana river in Hyūga of Tsukushi where he took off all his clothes and accessories after which he performed misogi in the waters to cleanse himself of kegare, the first god to be born from the things that were discarded is Tsukitatsufunado who was born from the staff that was thrown and this god alongside Yachimatahiko and Yachimatahime were believed to ward off beings from Yomi.

== See also ==
- Mishaguji
- Yomotsu Hirasaka
