= Aornum =

Oracle in ancient Greece

Orpheus's life

Aornum (Ancient Greek: Ἄορνον) was an oracle in Ancient Greece, located in Thesprotia in a cave called Charonium (Χαρώνειον ἄντρον or χάσμα) which gave forth poisonous vapours. The name of the cave, "Charon's Cave", reflects the belief that it was an entrance for Hades, the Greek underworld. In a version of the myth, Orpheus travels to Aornum to recover his wife, Eurydice, from Hades.

== See also ==
- Leibethra
- Pimpleia
- Yomotsu Hirasaka
