= Yomotsu Hirasaka =

Life-death boundary in Japanese mythology

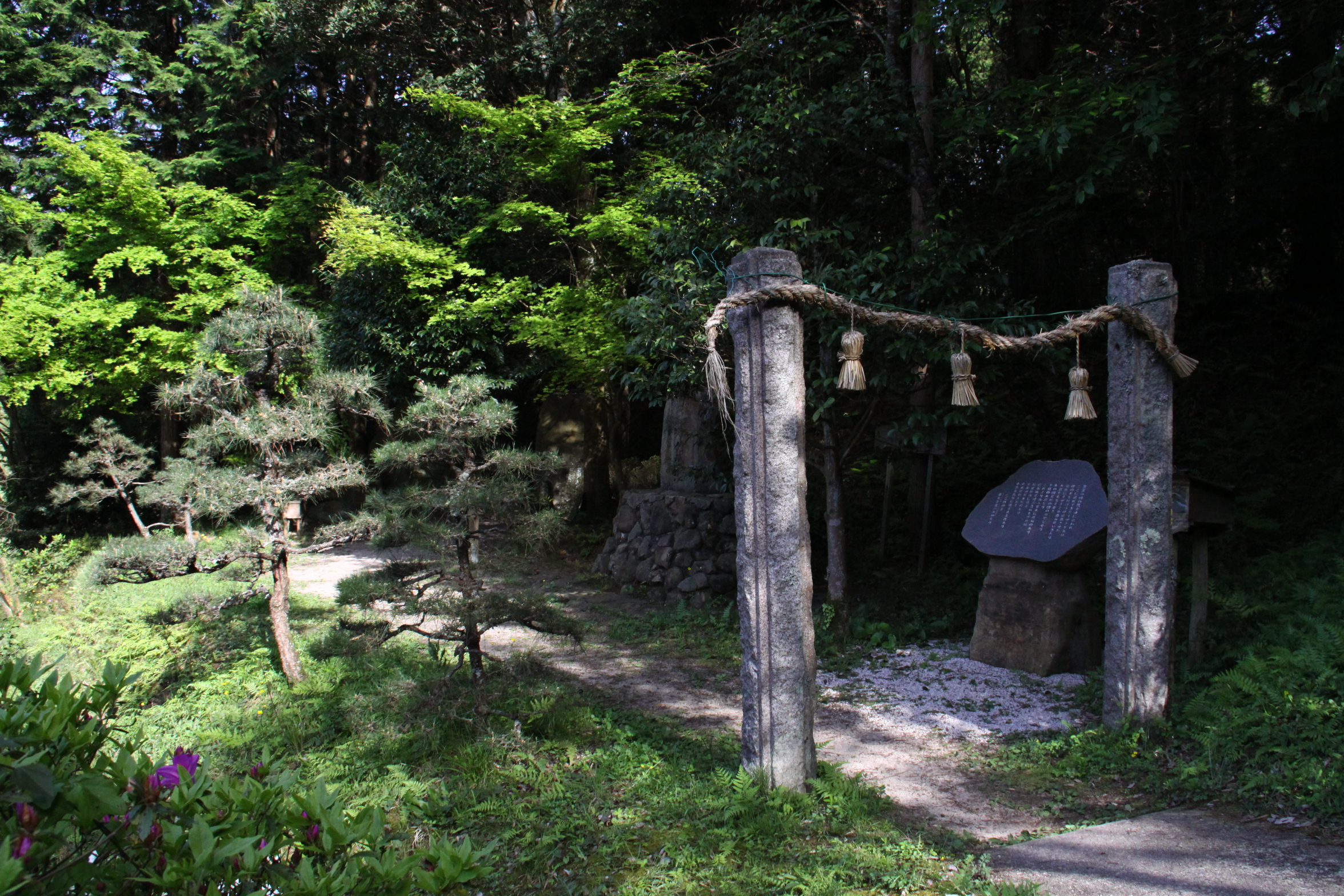
Kosen Hira-zaka and Izuyo-zaka in Higashiizumo Town

In Japanese mythology, Yomotsu Hirasaka (黄泉比良坂 or 黄泉平坂) is a slope or boundary between the world of the dead (Yomi) and the world of the living.

== Overview ==
The myth, which holds that there is a boundary place between the realms where the living and the dead reside, is an idea that is shared by the Sanzu River and others, and can be found throughout the world. In Japanese mythology, Yomotsu Hirasaka is thought to be an impression from the stone structure of kofun and the road leading to the stone chamber that housed the coffin.

In Kojiki, it appears twice in the upper part of the book, and there is a tradition that it is located at Ifuyasaka in Izumo Province. The word "hira" is said to mean "cliff".

== Places of connection ==
Shimane Prefecture, Matsue City, Higashiizumo Town erected a stone monument in 1940 in Iya, Higashiizumo, Shimane as the place where Hiraizumi Hiraizaka was located. A huge stone, said to be the rock of Senbiki, is also placed at the site. Nearby is the Iya Shrine, which is dedicated to Izanami. In the 2010 Japanese film, Matataki, the location was used as a location for the main character's visit to see her dead boyfriend.

According to "Unyo Shishi" written in Edo period, there is also a legend of Izanagi throwing peach fruits to the god of thunder at Komakaerizaka in Iwasaka, Matsue City.

== See also ==
- Aornum
- Avernus
- Kunado-no-Kami
- Ploutonion – A general term for entrances to the underworld. Many of them are places where poisonous gases are spewed.
- Pyramid
- Ziggurat
