= List of Saint Seiya: The Lost Canvas – Anecdotes characters =

The following article comprises a list of the characters appearing in the short story serialization Saint Seiya The Lost Canvas - Anecdotes, complementary to the manga Saint Seiya: The Lost Canvas.

These characters appear only in the Anecdotes sidestories and not in the main serialization, ranging from common folk to criminal organizations and the like, although some are featured briefly in the main serialization. Most of these characters appear only in a specific chapter.

As some of the characters appear only in this derivative work and not in Masami Kurumada's original manga, their canonicity within the universe of Kurumada's work is still unrevealed.

== Chapter Pisces ==
Pefko (ペフコ, Pefuko)
Pefko is a young boy whose life was saved by Pisces Albafica, by killing the cadre of Skeleton soldiers who hunted him down. Pefko was also an apprentice of the master healer Luco.
Pisces Lugonis (魚座(ピスケス)のルゴニス, Pisukesu no Rugonisu)
Voiced by: Jūrōta Kosugi
Pisces Lugonis was the previous Pisces Gold Saint and the master of Pisces Albafica. He adopted an orphan Albafica when the latter was a baby, cared for him and trained him in the ways of the Saints. Wanting Albafica to become the next Pisces Gold Saint after his death, he performed a ritual along with his disciple, consisting on exchanging blood to see who has the most poisonous one. Albafica's deadly poison blood proves too much for Rugonis, and he dies entrusting his pupil the Pisces Gold Cloth and his position as a Saint.
Heavenly Standing Star, Dryad Luco (天立星ドリュアスのルコ, Tenritsusei Doryuasu no Ruko)
Non-existent in Kurumada's original manga, Heavenly Standing Star, Dryad Luco is a Specter that was first introduced in the limited The Lost Canvas CD Drama, with his background further explored in the Anecdotes: Chapter Pisces short story. The Specter physically resembles Pisces Rugonis, Albafica's master, as the latter was Luco's older brother. Luco sought to relieve his brother from the curse of his poisonous blood, but was unable to as Rugonis died in the Red Bond ritual, thus Luco now seeks to heal Albafica. Later on, the boy Pefko reveals to Albafica the true reason behind his trek to Sanctuary: Luco is no longer the kind master he knew and is secretly concocting herb brews from the Underworld that transform people into servants of Hades. Realizing Pefko's betrayal, Luco reveals himself as the Dryad Specter to Albafica. Once a gifted Healer himself, when confronted by Albafica, it is revealed that he is immune to his poison due to his white lily field.
In the CD Drama, his attack is named Earth of Lily (アース・オブ・リリイ, Āsu obu Ririi). In the Anecdotes series, Luco is shown to have control over nature ("trees, herbs and flowers", in the Specter's words), claiming that everything is part of him as a Dryad, and he is able to take over Albafica's roses, drastically enlarge their thorns and manipulate them against the Gold Saint with his technique Curse of Lily (カース・オブ・リリイ, Kāsu obu Ririi). He was later killed by Albafica's Crimson Thorn technique.

== Chapter Scorpio ==
Tezcatlipoca (破壊神(テズカトリポカ), Hakai-Shin Tezukatoripoka)
One of the four sons of Ometecuhtli and Omecihuatl, he is associated with a wide range of concepts, including the night sky, the night winds, hurricanes, the north, the earth, obsidian, enmity, discord, rulership, divination, temptation, jaguars, sorcery, beauty, war and strife. His name in the Nahuatl language is often translated as "Smoking Mirror"
Carbela (カルベラ, Karubera)
Carbela is a young woman, the owner of the inn Scorpio Kardia visits regularly. She was sought for by the Jaguars, to present her as consort to their Sun Priest.
Jaguars (獣闘士(ジャガー), Jagā; lit. 'Beast Fighters')
The Jaguars are wandering warriors who serve the sun god, and wear the Nahuals (黒曜衣(ナワル), Nawaru; lit. 'Obsidian Mantle') as their armor. They tried to kidnap Carbela, only to be stopped by Scorpio Kardia, who seems to take interest in their challenge.
Sun Priest Wesda (太陽の神官ウエスダ, Taiyō no Shinkan Uesuda)
Wesda is the leader of the Jaguars, a priest who is a conduit between humans and the sun. He seeks to seize Scorpio Kardia's heart and use it as an offering to the sun. Worshipper of the God of Destruction Tezcatlipoca (破壊神テズカトリポカ, Hakai-Shin Tezukatoripoka), the enemy of the Quetzalcoatl, the snake god, Wesda is also the Jaguar of the Tezcatlipoca Nahual. He is also interested in Carbela, whom he has chosen as his consort. Wesda stabs Kardia in the heart with his Obsidian Fang (黒曜石の牙, Kokuyōseki no Kiba), also known as Tlacotli (生贄印(トラコトリ), Torakotori), to ensure he will be able to seize the Saint's heart, he also sought Athena's heart. Defeated by Scorpio Kardia.
Youaltepuztli Nahualpilli (ヨナルデパズトリのナワルピリ, Yonarudepazutori no Nawarupiri)
Nahualpilli is one of the Jaguars, a grotesque man who enjoys skinning his victims and is sent to kill Scorpio Kardia. He reveals himself to Kardia wearing a Nahual. He is later moved by Athena's pleas to Scorpio Kardia for his life, and sacrifices himself to protect Athena from Wesda's murder attempt.

== Chapter Aquarius ==
Fluorite (フローライト, Furōraito)
Fluorite is a young maid, servant to a house of aristocrats in the 18th century France. She seems to be in love with Aquarius Dégel, and sides with him in her quest for her missing father. She was created by Teshirogi on later stages of the anecdote's development as an audience surrogate.
Seraphina (セラフィナ, Serafina)
Seraphina was the older sister of Unity who was close friend of him and Dégel when they were young. Some years later, she traveled the world looking for assistance for her country, but she became ill and died. Devastated by his sister's death, Unity decided to use her body as a vessel for Poseidon's soul so he could be free through her and make Bluegrad a prosperous place. Her body was successfully possessed by Poseidon and manifested his powers despite not seeming to have a conscience. In order to stop Poseidon, Dégel locked himself alongside Seraphina and the city of Atlantis inside his ice. Before Fluorite's creation, she was intended to have a larger role in the Anecdotes chapters she appears in, and Teshirogi considered including a fight scene between her and the Jewel Carnelian, in which she was to use the Blue Impulse attack from Kurumada's manga, but ultimately discarded the idea.
Jaeit (ジェット, Jetto)
Jaeit is a spoiled, haughty young aristocrat, who treats his servants with great disdain, son to the marquis of a neighbouring country to France.
Vouivre Garnet (ガーネット, Gānetto)
Garnet is a young woman of the high society of France in the 18th century, whose beauty is such, it is said it enables her to have command over both her enemies and friends. In the past the wife of a kind noble, she was forced to flee when tragedy fell upon her. Afterward, she found the legendary Garnet of the Vouivre (ヴィーヴルの石榴石(ガーネット), Vīburu no Gānetto), which bestowed on her the ability to forever remain young by stealing the lifeforce of the townspeople, also granting her an armor known as Orb (宝石衣(オーブ), Ōbu), or Jeweled Mantles, specifically, Garnet's being the Vouivre Orb (ヴィーヴルの宝石衣(オーブ), Vīburu no Ōbu).
Koh-i-Noor Krjest (光の山(コー・イー・ヌール)のクレスト, Kō-Ī-Nūru no Kuresuto)
Named after the Indian diamond of legend, Koh-i-Noor Krjest is a 500-year-old man who came from the lands of the north, a survivor of Holy Wars against Hades, Poseidon and Ares, who took care of Sanctuary after the end of the holy war of the 15th century, mentor to Aquarius Dégel and the previous Aquarius Gold Saint. Given back his youth, he is one of Garnet's Jewels, who mastered the atom-freezing combat style of the Saints, as exhibited by his Diamond Dust (ダイヤモンドダスト, Daiyamondo Dasuto) and Freezing Shield (フリージングシールド, Furījingu Shīrudo) techniques, and also wears an Orb armor, a dark version of the Aquarius Gold Cloth. Disillusioned by the neverending holy wars, Krjest met Garnet, who offered him the chance of achieving peace by means of everlasting life, thus he betrayed Athena and severed his ties with Sanctuary. He also appears briefly in Scorpio Kardia's extra short story Scorpion's Interlude. His name appears spelled as Крест (Russian for cross) in chapter 2. Krjest also appears as a teenager wearing the Aquarius Gold Cloth among the rest of Gold Saints of his generation, in the extra images supplied in vol. 3 of Anecdotes, and was later stated by Teshirogi to have been the youngest Saint in service in his time.
The Jewels (宝石児(ジュエルズ), Jueruzu; lit. 'Jeweled Children')
The Jewels are the elite troops of Garnet's household and personal guard to her, formed by the young warriors named after gemstones: Carnelian (紅玉髄(コーネリアン), Kōnerian), who has command over blood, Chalcedony (玉髄(カルセドニー), Karusedonī), caster of illusions, Tourmaline (電気石(トルマリン), Torumarin) who commands electricity, Flint (火打石(フリント), Furinto) of the flaming fist, and Koh-i-Noor Krjest.
Flailles (フライユ, Furaiyu)
Flailles is a young woman who seeks revenge on Garnet, who seduced her husband and then didn't reciprocate his affections, leading him to commit suicide.
War God Ares (戦神・アレス, Senjin Aresu)
From Kurumada's original manga, Ares, is the fierce and bloodthirsty god of war, who battled Athena and her Saints millennia ago, in the ages of myth. Since Kurumada has never revealed Ares' appearance in his manga, Teshirogi employed an original design to portray the deity in a brief cameo in Chapter Aquarius.

== Chapter Cancer ==
Gioca (ジョーカ, Jōka)
Gioca is a young orphaned pickpocket in the streets of the 18th century Italy. Gioca first appears disguised as a boy, but her true gender and her background as the descendant of the guardian in the Rangda mask are revealed by the Black Saints. Gioca is the only remaining member of the Death Queen Island Clan (デスクィーン島の一族, Desu Kwīn-tō no Ichizoku) as they were all murdered by Black Hound Yudo. She inadvertently involves herself in the crisis of the Black Saints by stealing Cancer Manigoldo's coin purse during one of her scapades. Later, she stealthily follows the Saints by tracking their Cosmo, as she reveals she possesses a marginal mastery of Cosmo, having awakened her own sometime ago. She is accompanied by her little pet monkey Tonto (トント). Gioca is sought after by the Black Saints in order to force her to destroy the Rangda mask. Driven to the edge of desperation by Yudo, she awakens her Cosmo once again, knocking out Yudo momentarily.
Pesce and Pigro (ペーシェとピグロ, Pēshe to Piguro)
Pesce and Pigro are Gioca's young friends and fellow pickpockets.
Lumaca of the Nero (暗黒(ネーロ)のルマーカ, Nēro no Rumāka)
Lumaca is the abusive self-appointed leader of Gioca's pickpocket band, whom he strips of their loot to send to the Nero criminal organization in order to improve his lowly status within it. Manigoldo kills him because of his crimes, and tries to interrogate his spirit; before Lumaca manages to reveal any relevant information, his spirit is cremated by means of Praesepe Demonic Blue Flames, conjured by Don Avido.
Black Saints (暗黒聖闘士(ブラックセイント), Burakku Seinto)
From Kurumada's original manga, the Black Saints, are former and failed Saints who instead of using their power to defend justice and peace, devoted it to the pursuit of their own ambitions, and turned to a life of crime and violence, thus they were stripped of their title of Saint of Athena. They are featured prominently as antagonists in Chapter Cancer, in which they pursue their own ends operating under the façade of a criminal organization known as the Nero (暗黒(ネーロ), Nēro). The Black Andromeda Saint and the Black Swan Saint are featured briefly during Koh-i-Noor Krjest's mention of previous wars in Chapter Aquarius.
Black Altar Avido (暗黒祭壇星座(ブラックアルター)のアヴィド, Burakku Arutā no Avido)
Avido is the Altar Black Saint as well as the Don (首領(ドン)) of the Nero organization, and former apprentice of Altar Hakurei. He has mastered the Praesepe combat technique, commonly associated with the Cancer Gold Saint, as proven by his usage of the Praesepe Demonic Blue Flames (積尸気鬼蒼焔, Sekishiki Kisōen) on Lumaca's spirit, he also is able to use the technique to destroy not only the soul but also the body of his victim. He was driven out of the Sanctuary by Hakurei once he surrendered to greed. Avido still bears a grudge against his former master and believes the Sanctuary to be unworthy of ruling the world, as they are devoid of desires.
Black Whale Alegre (暗黒鯨星座(ブラックホエール)のアレグレ, Burakku Hoēru no Aregure)
Alegre is a member of the Nero organization and enemy of Athena's Sanctuary, who secretly conspires to kill Cancer Manigoldo and Pisces Albafica, to steal their Gold Cloths. A priest corrupted by the delights of the flesh, he believes that people get closer to God when they follow their instinctive wishes. No longer hiding his true identity to Cancer Manigoldo and Pisces Albafica, he reveals himself as Black Whale Alegre, a Black Saint able to sense Manigoldo's mastery of the Praesepe arts. His technique Holy Spout (ホーリースパウト, Hōrī Supauto) allows him to purify and release spirits, and therefore renders him immune to Praesepe attacks, while the Will Baritsu (ウィイルバリツ, Wīru Baritsu) is a powerful offensive that crushes the opponent. Manigoldo is still able to fight and kill the Black Saint with his physical attack Acubens. His Black Cloth is the counterpart for Mozes Whale Silver Cloth. His Black Cloth appeared briefly in a panel in Kurumada's manga.
Black Heracles Laimargos (レマルゴス, Remarugosu)
Laimargos is a member of the Nero organization and enemy of Athena's Sanctuary, who expresses disdain towards Lumaca. He secretly conspires to kill Cancer Manigoldo and Pisces Albafica, to steal their Gold Cloths. Laimargos is also secretly a Black Saint. He was killed by the Roses of Albafica. Laimargos Black Cloth is a counterpart to Heracles Algethi's Silver Cloth.
Black Crow Rusé (暗黒烏星座(ブラッククロウ)のリュゼ, Burakku Kurō no Ryuze)
Rusé is also a member of the Nero and enemy of Athena's Sanctuary. Rusé introduces himself as Black Crow Rusé, revealing his allegiance, and considering his beauty even greater than Pisces Albafica's, he engages him in combat, easily negating the Gold Saint's attack by means of his Black Feather Defense (ブラックフェザーディフェンス, Burakku Fezā Difensu) technique, and also through his command over crows. He secretly conspires to kill Cancer Manigoldo and Albafica, to steal their Gold Cloths. Rusé is later killed by Avido as punishment for his failure to defeat Pisces Albafica. Rusé's Black Cloth is a counterpart to Crow Jamian's Silver Cloth.
Black Hound Yudo (暗黒猟犬星座(ブラックハウンド)のユド, Burakku Haundo no Yudo)
Yudo is also a member of the Nero and enemy of Athena's Sanctuary, conspiring to kill Cancer Manigoldo and Albafica in order to steal their Gold Cloths. He mastered the Satori technique, which allows him to read minds. He reveals himself to Gioca as Black Hound Yudo, and claims to be the one who slaughtered her family, the guardians of Death Queen Island, years ago. This allowed the group to escape, but the other Black Saints remain trapped as long as the Rangda mask exists - as only a member of the guardian clan is able to destroy it, he tries to goad Gioca into doing it. He was killed by the Bloody Rose of Pisces Albafica. His Black Cloth is a counterpart to Hound Asterion's Silver Cloth.

== Chapter Capricorn ==
Puppis Lacaille (船尾座(パピス)のラカーユ, Papisu no Rakāyu)
Briefly appearing in the Lost Canvas main serialization, Puppis Lacaille is one of Capricorn El Cid's apprentices. His name and constellation were first revealed in the anime adaptation and his background is further explored in the Anecdotes chapters. Lacaille is a young swordsmith-in-training who first met Capricorn El Cid during his travel to Lacaille's hometown, and later cheers for the Gold Saint as he enters the fighting tournament held at the Catalania Colosseum (陽炎闘技場(カタラニアコロシアム), Katarania Koroshiamu).
Lacaille's father (ラカーユの親父, Rakāyu no oyaji)
Lacaille's father is the renowned master swordsmith of their village located near the desert where a city known as Catalania (陽炎(カタラニア), Katarania) appeared one night, holding a martial tournament. He strives for his son Lacaille to hone his skills as a swordsmith to their peak.
Princess Mine (峰姫, Mine-hime)
A young Japanese woman known as the Beautiful Maiden of Catalania, Princess Mine has a deep connection to Capricorn El Cid's past, as she was his training partner during his time as a Saint apprentice, before succumbing to tuberculosis. Mysteriously returning from beyond the grave, she wields the legendary Magic Sword Zan'ōki (妖剣・斬桜鬼, Yōken Zan'ōki; lit. 'murderous demon of the cherry blossom').
Ferser the Black Terror (黒き戦慄のフェルサー, Kuroki Senritsu no Ferusā)
A participant in the tournament at the Catalania Colosseum, and a figure from El Cid's past, Ferser the Black Terror, once the supreme ruler of Catalania, prepares to engage Capricorn El Cid in battle, who is surprised to meet him again. In the past, friend and training partner to El Cid and Mine and a kind-hearted young man.
Demon Whirlwind Jericho (鬼旋風のジェリコ, Kisenpū no Jeriko)
An enormous flail-wielding warrior, Demon Whirlwind Jericho battles against Capricorn El Cid in the tournament, meeting utter defeat at the hands of the Gold Saint.
Electric Mechanism Palmer (電気仕掛のパルマー, Denki Shikake no Parumā)
A seemingly harmless human, Electric Mechanism Palmer, makes up for his weaknesses with the use of deadly electric mechanisms of his creation, such as a gigantic marionette, who engages Capricorn El Cid in the tournament of Catalania, not managing to defeat the Gold Saint.
Oneiroi (夢の四神, Yume no Yonshin; "The Four Dream Gods")
First revealed by Teshirogi in the Lost Canvas main serialization, the Oneiroi are the gods of dreaming and children of Hypnos, malevolent deities who were being investigated by Capricorn El Cid and Sagittarius Sisyphos several years before their fateful encounter. They comprise God of Dreams Oneiros (夢の神 オネイロス, Yume no Kami Oneirosu), Illusion Icelos (幻夢 イケロス, Mugen Ikerosu), Transformer Phantasos (仮像者 パンタソス, Kazōsha Pantasosu), and Molder Morpheus (造形者 モルペウス, Zōkeisha Morupeusu).
Dream God Phobetor (夢神 ボペトール, Mushin Pobetōru)
Also one of the Oneiroi, Phobetor is sibling to the god of Dreams and a child of Hypnos, the personification of nightmares who feeds on the dreams of humans, and the first of the Oneiroi to engage Capricorn El Cid in battle, taking possession of Ferser's body in order to achieve his goals.

== Chapter Libra ==
Yī-Lín (依林(イーリン), Ī Rin)
Eleven years old, Yī-Lín is a cute girl who arrives to the famed Lushan waterfall, for a short stay with Libra Dohko.
Hào (昊(ハオ), Hao)
Hào is Yī-Lín's father and Dohko's old friend.
Taonia (彫道士(タオニア), Taonia; lit. 'Engraved Taoists')
An order of legendary warriors of the Xian Jing, the fairylands between human and spirit world, are the Taonia, or Pursuing Clerics, were renowned protectors of peace through the use of the power of the forces of nature, only to protect, and never to attack. The Taonia ambush Dohko, much to his amazement. They also wear an armor known as Tattoo (墨衣(タトゥー), Tatū; lit. 'Ink Mantle').
Liú-Xīng (流星(リュウシン), Ryūshin)
One of the Taonia, Liú-Xīng is the commander of the cadre of warriors that ambushes Libra Dohko. Liú-Xīng bears an uncanny resemblance to the late Pegasus Tenma, which amazes Dohko. His name means "Meteor"(as in Pegasus Meteor Fist).
Hakutaku (白澤(ハクタク), Hakutaku)
A young man who leads the Taonia, Baí Zé aims to become emperor of China. His true name is Fēi-Yǎn (飛眼(フェイガン), Feigan). True to his assumed name, he wears the Tattoo of Bai Ze (白澤(ハクタク)の墨衣(タトゥー), Hakutaku no Tatū)
Huī (灰(フウイ), Fūi)
Also one of the Taonia and loyal to the young Hakutaku. Huī wears the Tattoo of the Nine-Tailed Fox (九尾の狐の墨衣(タトゥー), Kyūbi-no-Kitsune no Tatū). He engages Libra Dohko in battle, trying to burn him alive with his Hú Cāng Huǒ Yàn (狐蒼火焔(フーツァン フォイェン), Fūtsan Foien; lit "Fox Blue Blaze") technique, a powerful blaze shaped in the image of a fox.
Mǔdān (牡丹(ムーダン), Mūdan)
A cheerful, care-free and unassuming young girl, Mǔdān is one of the Taonia, and younger sister of Hakutaku, to whom she is fiercely loyal. She wears the Sparrow Tattoo (雀の墨衣(タトゥー), Suzume no Tatū). Mudan later encounters Libra Dohko and Liú-Xīng, engaging them in battle. She overwhelms the Gold Saint with her Pòhuài Xiǎo Zhuàn (破壊小囀(ポオ ファイ シャオ ヂュアン), Pō Fai Shao Juan) technique, a massive concentration of powerful sound-waves, which Dohko is later able to overcome by destroying the chimes used by Mǔdān to manipulate the sound-waves.

== Chapter Leo ==
Conner (コナー, Konā)
A young girl who befriends Leo Regulus, during the time when he had recently been ordained as a Saint.
Failinis (ファリニシュ, Farinishu)
A young warrior woman, Conner's friend and protector, who has sworn to keep her from Geis harm. She battles the curses of the servants of the evil eye with her Lightning Slay (ライトニング・スレイ, Raitoningu Surei) technique.
God of Light Lugh (光の神ルー, Hikari no Kami Rū)
The Irish deity and High King of the distant past, whom Conner's family served and worshipped.
Crúaich (クルワッハ, Kuruwahha)
An Irish aristocrat, the antagonist in Chapter Leo. He wields the power of the mythical Balor (バロール, Barōru) and he's the leader of the clan of the Druids (魔術師(ドルイド), Doruido; lit. 'Magician'), which has tried to resurrect the king of the Fomorians, since the ages of myth. In past, he was a friend of Conner's father Muirgheas (モリアス, Moriasu).
Banshee Shelley (バンシーのシェリー, Banshī no Sherī)
An unearthly being summoned by Crúaich, to deal with Conner and Leo Regulus. She first introduces herself as The Elfin Banshee (妖精のバンシー, Yōsei no Banshī), later revealing her true name. She defeats Failinis and then engages Leo Regulus, trying to kill him along Conner with her Lamentation Rain (ラメンテーションレイン, Ramentēshon Rein) attack. Regulus is gravely wounded but is able to overcome the effects of her attack, and ultimately kills Shelley.
Ethlinn (エスリン, Esurin)
Crúaich's estranged young daughter.

== Chapter Virgo ==
Kagebōshi of the Earthly Repose Star (地鎮星の影法師, Jichinsei no Kagebōshi)
First introduced in a splash page in the first issues of The Lost Canvas, the Earthly Repose Star Specter appears in a more active role in the Anecdotes series, in the Virgo chapter, battling Virgo Asmita. He refers to himself to be a servant of Āṭavaka. He tries to murder Asmita by means of his Shadow Pacifier (影降伏, Kage-gōpuku) technique, but the Gold Saint proves too strong for the Specter and is soon overpowered and killed.
Ahimsa (アヒンサー, Ahinsā)
A young Buddhist man who met Virgo Asmita eleven years before the events described in the Virgo chapter, when both were training to achieve enlightenment.
Heavenly Savage Star, Bennu Kagaho (天暴星ベヌウの輝火, Tenbōsei Benū no Kagaho)
The fierce Bennu Specter, one of the strongest in the army of Hades and with a prominent role in The Lost Canvas main serialization, also appears in the Anecdotes, years before the events of the Holy War of 1747.
Sui (翠)
Kagaho's younger brother, who considered himself a burden for his sibling. Sui committed suicide many years ago to relieve his brother of the burden. His death had an enormous impact on Kagaho's behavior and way of thinking. As noted by Libra Dohko, Sui bore a striking resemblance to Alone. Sui appears briefly in Chapter Virgo, as a vision conjured by Asmita.
Specter of Earthly Leader Star Āṭavaka (地魁星アタバクの冥闘士(スペクター), Chkaisei Atabaku no Supekutā)
A singular Specter, who enjoys a special position among the 108 Demonic Stars of Hades' Army, and thus he is not subjected to Pandora's authority. The Earthly Repose Star's Specter was one of his subjects, as he rules in the hellish Six Realms of afterlife, that he considers his "gardens". He enslaves souls to do his bidding, such as in his technique The Demonic Treasures of Heavenly Nothingness (魔天無宝輪, Matenmu Hōrin), a distorted version of Asmita's The Treasures of Heavens technique, with which Āṭavaka tries to murder the Virgo Gold Saint during their final duel, but ultimately fails and dies.

== Chapter Taurus ==
Taurus Teneo (牡牛座(タウラス)のテネオ, Taurasu no Teneo)
Previously a Saint apprentice under Taurus Hasgard, Teneo became the inheritor of the Taurus Gold Cloth and the status of the Taurus Gold Saint after his mentor's demise in the Holy War of 1747. Six years later, Teneo fulfills his duty as guardian of the Taurus Palace at Sanctuary. Aries Shion dispatches Teneo to investigate suspicious activity in Mount Etna, related to the devastating Gigantomachia Holy War (聖戦ギガントマキア, Seisen Gigantomakia), which took place millennia ago, in the ages of myth.
Aries Shion (牡牛座(アリエス)のシオン, Ariesu no Shion)
The lone survivor along Libra Dohko from the Holy War against Hades in 1747. He was appointed the Pope of Sanctuary by Athena six years before the events in Chapter Taurus.
Celintha (セリンサ, Serinsa)
Formerly Teneo's comrade of trials under Taurus Hasgard, Celintha forsook the ways of the Saints after her mentor's demise. In 1753, she has become a school teacher in the Rodrio village.
Saro (サロ, Saro)
The youngest of Taurus Rasgado's pupils, whose life was tragically cut short after the Holy War of 1747. His grave is now visited often by Celintha.
Agasha (アガシャ)
An acquaintance of the late Pisces Albafica, who saved her life years ago. Agasha is a young woman who still leads a simple life in the Rodrio village, as assistant and friend to Celintha.
Cor Tauri (コル・タウリ, Koru Tauri)
A towering, bull-like humanoid automaton, extremely powerful in the mysteries of the Cosmo. He is the person from whom Taurus Rasgado obtained the monicker of Aldebaran. Well regarded by Celintha and Rasgado despite his fearsome appearance, he is fondly named "Master Cor Tauri" by them. His name means "Bull Heart" in Latin.
Typhon (テュポン, Tyupon)
The savage and most terrible monster in Greek Mythology, feared even by the Olympian gods. He was defeated and sealed by Zeus at the end of the Gigantomachia, in the ages of myth, beneath Mount Etna, in Sicily, along with his powerful brother, the giant Enceladus (大音響を鳴らす者(エンケラドス), Enkeradosu). Signals of his dreaded resurrection prompt Aries Shion to investigate by sending Taurus Teneo to the area.

== Chapter Sagittarius ==
Sagittarius Sisyphos (射手座(サジタリアス)のシジフォス, Sajitariasu no Shijifuosu)
The Sagittarius Gold Saint in the main serialization of The Lost Canvas, younger brother of Leo Illias and uncle and mentor to Leo Regulus the embodiment of the ideal of the true Saint of Athena. In 1730, he appears as a young Saint apprentice, who has almost finished his training and is undergoing his final trials to attain the title of Saint and to prove he is worthy of the Sagittarius Gold Cloth.

Taurus Hasgard (牡牛座(タウラス)のハスガード, Taurasu no Hasugādo)
The Taurus Gold Saint in the main serialization of The Lost Canvas, mentor to Taurus Teneo and gifted with tremendous strength and speed. In 1730, he appears as a young Saint apprentice. Nearing the end of his training, he seeks to prove he is worthy of the Taurus Gold Cloth and the title of Saint.
Gemini Aspros (双子座(ジェミニ)のアスプロス, Jemini no Asupurosu)
The older Gemini Gold Saint in the main serialization of The Lost Canvas, regarded as the man who can smash stars, and the conspirator who would attempt to overthrow the Pope of Sanctuary in the future. In 1730, Aspros appears as a young Saint apprentice, seeking to prove he is worthy of attaining the title of Saint and of the right to wear the Gemini Gold Cloth.
The Pythia (巫女(ピュティア), Pyutia)
The shrine maidens and priestesses of Delphi.

== Chapter Gemini ==
The Berserkers (狂戦士(バーサーカー), Bāsākā; lit. 'Insane Soldiers')
Previously mentioned only in Tatsuya Hamazaki's Hypermyth novelization, the Berserkers comprise the ranks of the army of Ares, the god of war, who engaged Athena in conflict millennia ago, being sealed by the goddess in the aftermath. They are brought back to life in 1747, by mysterious forces.
Jamadhar Áima (ジャマダハルの血(エマ), Jamadaharu no Ema)
A Berserker previously defeated in the Coliseum by Athena's army eons ago, who came back to life after Gemini Aspros removed Athena's Seal from the Coliseum. Named after the Greek word for "blood" (αίμα). Regarded along with his older brother Kókalo as the strongest in the Ephodos of the Corps of Flames (炎の軍団突撃部隊(エフォドス), Honō no Gundan Efodosu). With his technique Cremation Storm (クレメーション・ストーム, Kuremēshon Sutōmu), Aίma is able to use Ares' flames around him to set his enemies ablaze and at the same time attack with his Jamadhar.
Bhuj Kókalla (ブージのコ骨(カロ), Būji no Kokaro)
Also a Berserker from Ares' army, from the ranks of the Ephodos and brother to Jamadhar Hema. Named after the Greek word for "bones" (κόκκαλα). They engage Gemini Defteros and Aquarius Dégel in a fierce battle.
Ares, God of War (戦神アレス, Senjin Aresu)
Briefly mentioned in the first chapter of Kurumada's manga and in Anecdotes Chapter Aquarius, the fierce and bloodthirsty god of war, who battled Athena and her Saints millennia ago, in the ages of myth.

== Chapter Gemini Aspros ==
Heavenly Wounding Star, Ketos Chris (天損星ケートスのクリス, Tensonsei Kētosu no Kurisu)
A young girl, protected from her persecutors by Gemini Aspros. She seeks assistance from the Gold Saint in her desperate situation. She later awakens to her destiny as one of Hades' Specters, when she is enveloped by her Surplice.
Heavenly Long-lived Star, Vampire Erhart (天寿星ヴァンパイのアエアハート, Tenjūsei Banpaia no Eahāto)
A Specter from Hades' ranks.
Earthly Karmic Star, Upyr Leibold (地因星ウプイリーのレイボールド, Chiinsei Upuirī no Reibōrudo)
A Specter from Hades' ranks, subordinate to Vampire Erhart.
Ursula (ウルスラ, Urusura)
Chris's older sister, a young woman, vicious and merciless. Companion to Vampire Erhart and Upyr Leibold, she revels in wickedness and destruction.

== Chapter Aries ==
Aries Shion (牡羊座(アリエス)のシオン, Ariesu no Shion)
The Aries Gold Saint in the 18th century and future Pope of Sanctuary.
Aries Avenir (牡羊座(アリエス)のアヴニール, Ariesu no Avunīru)
The Aries Gold Saint in the 16th century, veteran of the Holy War against Hades in that era, and comrade-in-arms and close friend to Altar Hakurei and Cancer Sage.
Taurus Teneo (牡牛座(タウラス)のテネオ, Taurasu no Teneo)
Previously a Saint apprentice under Taurus Hasgard, Teneo became the inheritor of the Taurus Gold Cloth and the status of the Taurus Gold Saint after his mentor's demise in the Holy War of 1747. Six years later, Teneo fulfills his duty as guardian of the Taurus Palace at Sanctuary.
Centaurus Yugo (ケンタウルス星座のユゴ, Kentaurusu no Yugo)
The Centaurus Silver Saint in the 16th Century.
Renner (レナー, Renā)
Taurus Teneo's disciple.

== The Elder Twins Chapter ==
Altar Hakurei (祭壇座(アルター)のハクレイ, Arutā no Hakurei)
The Altar Silver Saint in the 16th century. Twin brother of Cancer Sage.
Sagitta Alcon (矢座(サジッタ)のアルコン, Sagitta no Alcon)
The Arrow Silver Saint in the 16th century.
Cancer Sage (蟹座(キャンサー)のセージ, Kyansa no Sēji)
The Cancer Gold Saint in the 16th century, twin brother of Altar Hakurei and future Pope of Sanctuary in The Lost Canvas main serialization.
Leo Ilias (獅子座(レオ)のイリアス, Reo no Iriasu)
The Leo Gold Saint in the previous 18th-century generation, father to Leo Regulus. Highly regarded in Sanctuary and considered a hero and example of the true Saint. Comrade in arms to Scorpio Zaphiri and Pisces Rugonis.
Scorpio Zaphiri (蠍座(スコーピオン)のザフィリ, Sukōpion no Zafiri)
The strong-willed and determined Scorpio Gold Saint in the previous 18th-century generation. He intended to bestow Poseidon's divine power upon himself at the expense of his life and his dignity as a Saint.
Pisces Rugonis (魚座(ピスケス)のルゴニス, Pisukesu no Rugonisu)
The Pisces Gold Saint in the previous 18th-century generation. Comrade in arms to Leo Ilias and Scorpio Zaphiri.
Aries Gateguard (牡羊座(アリエス)のゲートガード, Ariesu no Gētogādo)
The Aries Gold Saint in the previous 16th-century generation. Comrade in arms to Cancer Sage and Aquarius Krjest. He appears to show allegiance to Hades.
Taurus Francisca (牡牛座(タウラス)のフランキスカ, Taurasu no Furankisuka)
The Taurus Gold Saint in the previous 16th-century generation. Comrade in arms to Cancer Sage and Aquarius Krest.
Aquarius Krjest (水瓶座(アクエリアス)のクレスト, Akueriasu no Kuresuto)
The Aquarius Gold Saint in the 14th century, and veteran of several Holy Wars. Comrade in arms to Leo Ilias, Cancer Sage, Scorpio Zaphiri and Pisces Rugonis, and mentor to Aquarius Dégel. He appears in the days of his youth, as a wise and prudent Gold Saint who is aware of the crisis faced by Athena's Sanctuary.

== See also ==
- List of Saint Seiya: The Lost Canvas – Anecdotes chapters
- List of Saint Seiya: The Lost Canvas characters
- List of Saint Seiya characters
