= Four Souls =

Four Souls may refer to:

- Four Souls (novel), a 2004 novel by Louise Erdrich
- Lenny McBrowne and the Four Souls, an American jazz group
- Four Souls, a 2002 ballet by Francesco Libetta
- "Four Souls", a chapter of the manga series Saint Seiya: The Lost Canvas

== See also ==
- The Binding of Isaac: Four Souls, a card game
- Jewel of Four Souls, a fictional object in the manga series Inuyasha
