= Bhuj (weapon) =

Knife or dagger originating from Gujarat

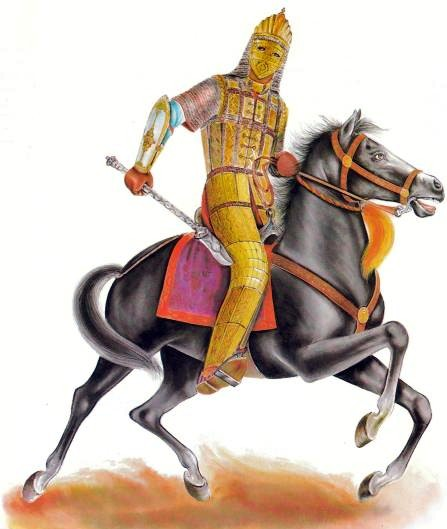
Sindhi knight armed with a bhuj

A Kaat, Kāti, Kuttai also known as Bhuj is a type of knife or dagger from Sindh and Kutch district of Gujarat.

== Description and History ==
Kaat is commonly called an axe-knife, because the blade is fixed onto an axe-like haft. The weapon is called as Kaat and Kaati in Sindh, the Kaat is usually bigger in size than Kaati, The weapon originated in Sindh and the city of Bhuj in the Kutch district of the state of Gujarat, from where it derived its name. The bhuj is short, broad, stout, and heavy, with a mild curve. It often sports an engraved and gilded mount, inlaid haft and decorated knob. This knob is typically a stylized elephant head. The short re-curved blade measures 7–10 in (180–250 mm) long, and its copper sheath makes the weapon 20 in (510 mm) long in total. It is mostly single-edged, except for a slight rear edge at the tip. The blade is mounted at a right angle to a metal haft in a manner similar to a long axe. The haft is sometimes hollow, concealing another small stiletto-like dagger. The weapon is similar to the Punjabi gandasa or the European glaive. The weapon was popular among the Sindhi cavalry of the Soomra and Samma dynasties of Sindh.

There are also Sindhi folk songs about Kaat dagger. The well known song "Kaat muhje kandh te, aon khayo pio achan. Jiye Sindh, jiye Sindh, aon chawando achan". Sung by Sarmad Sindhi.

== Images ==
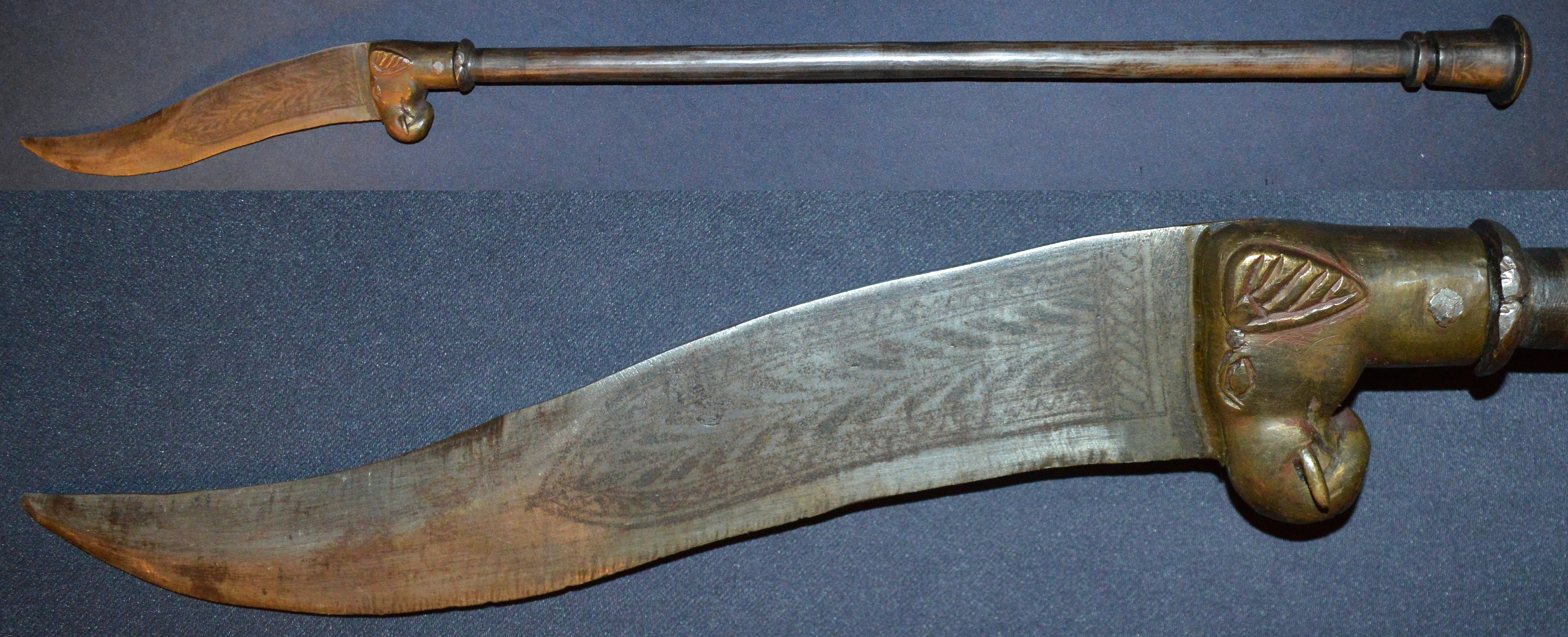

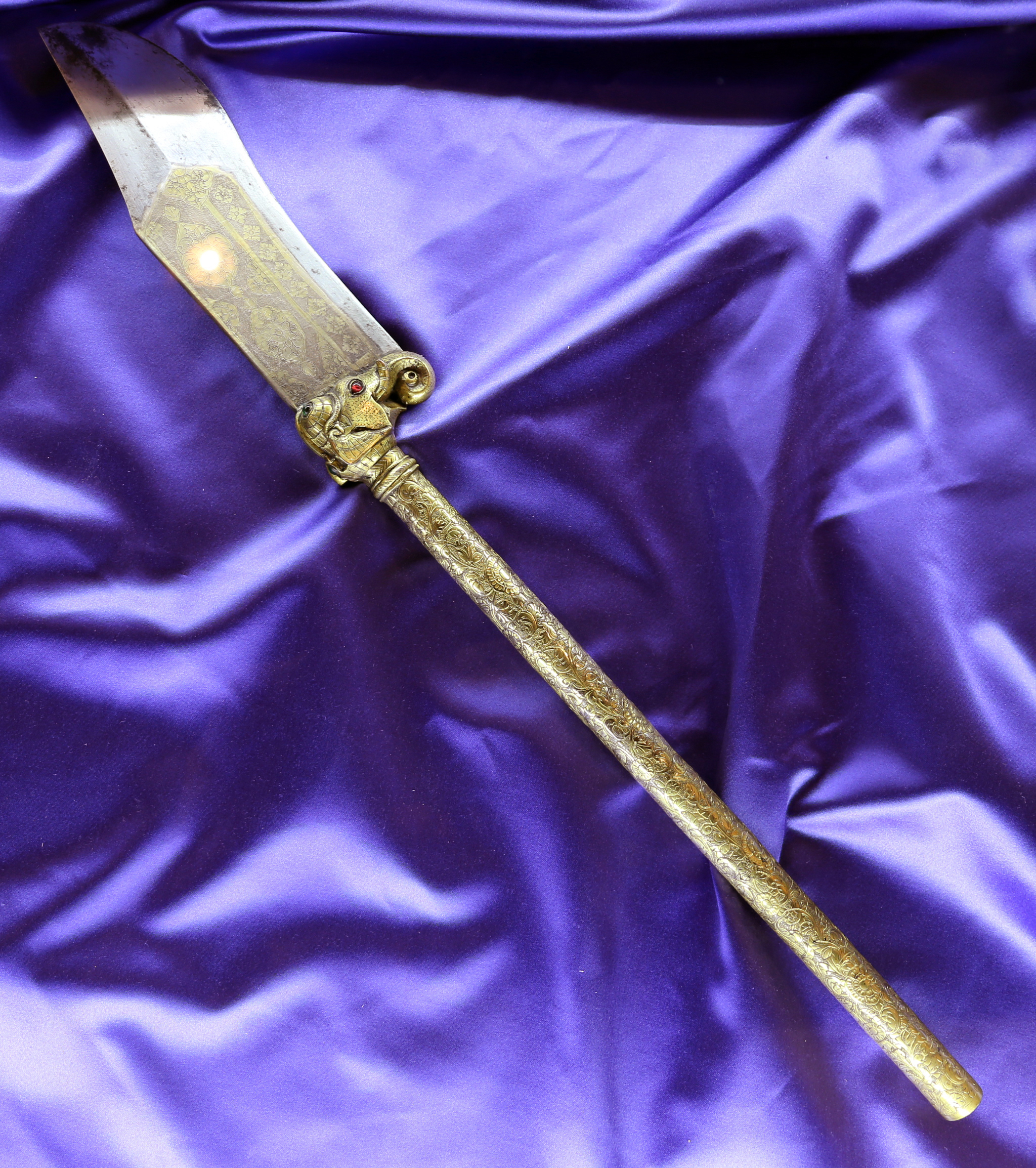

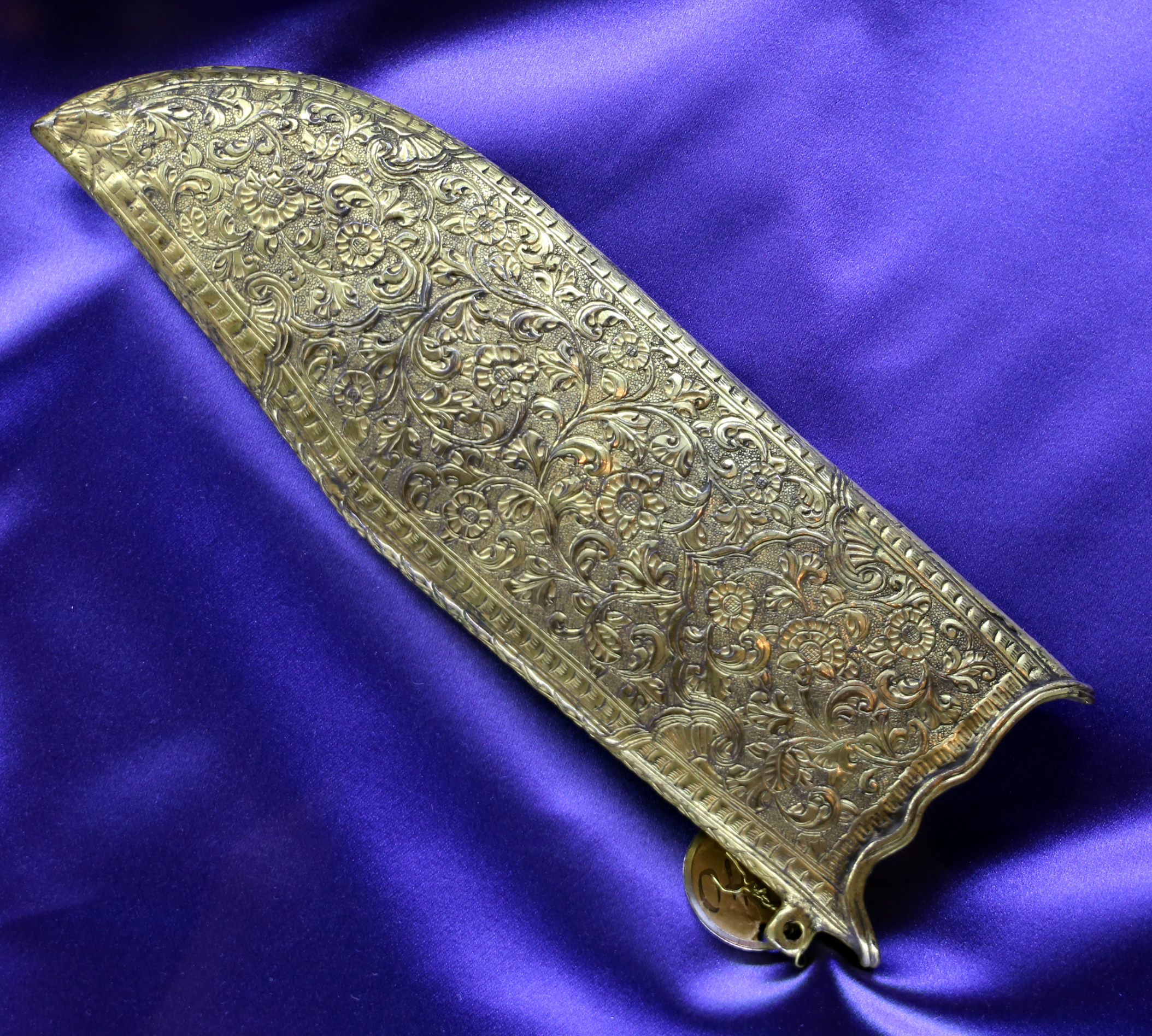

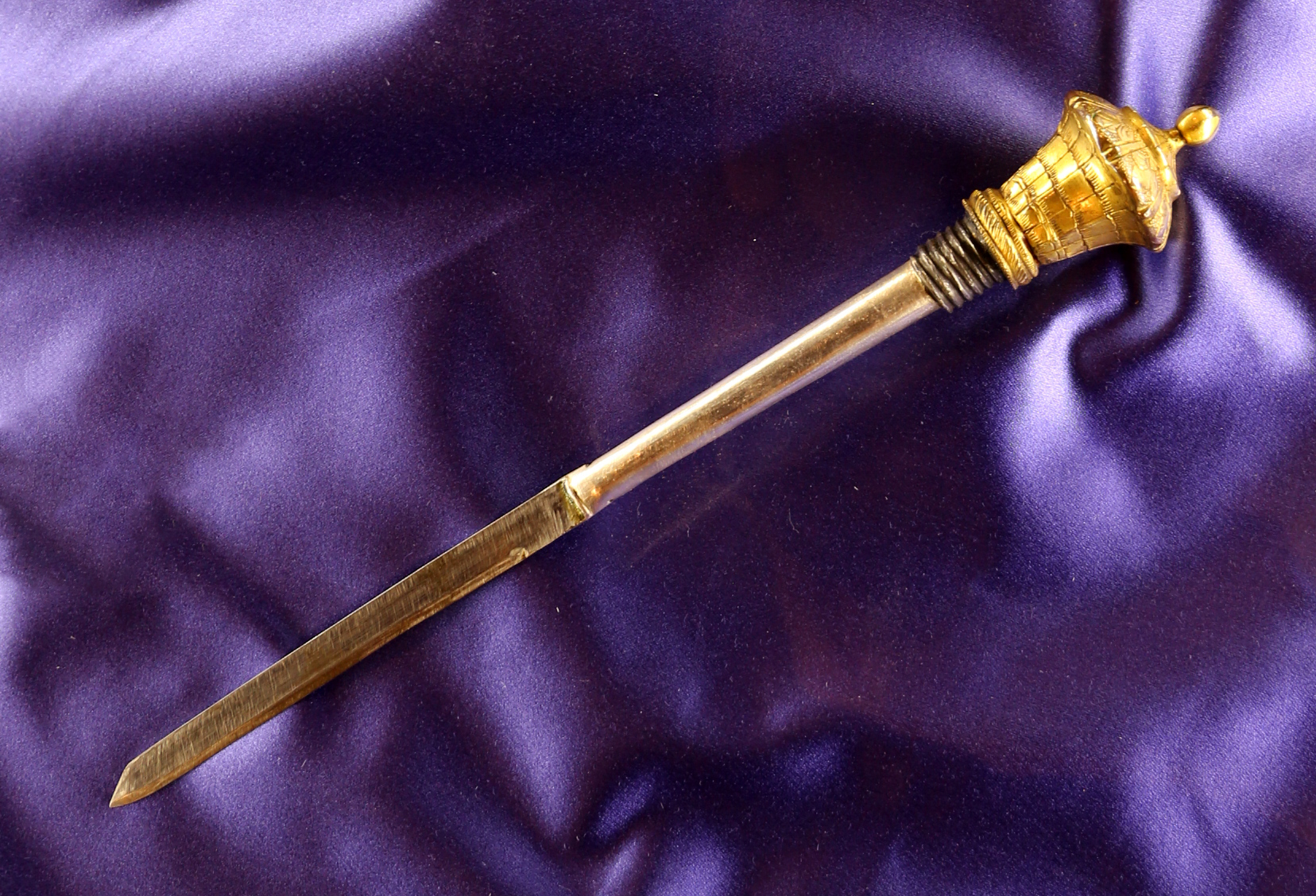

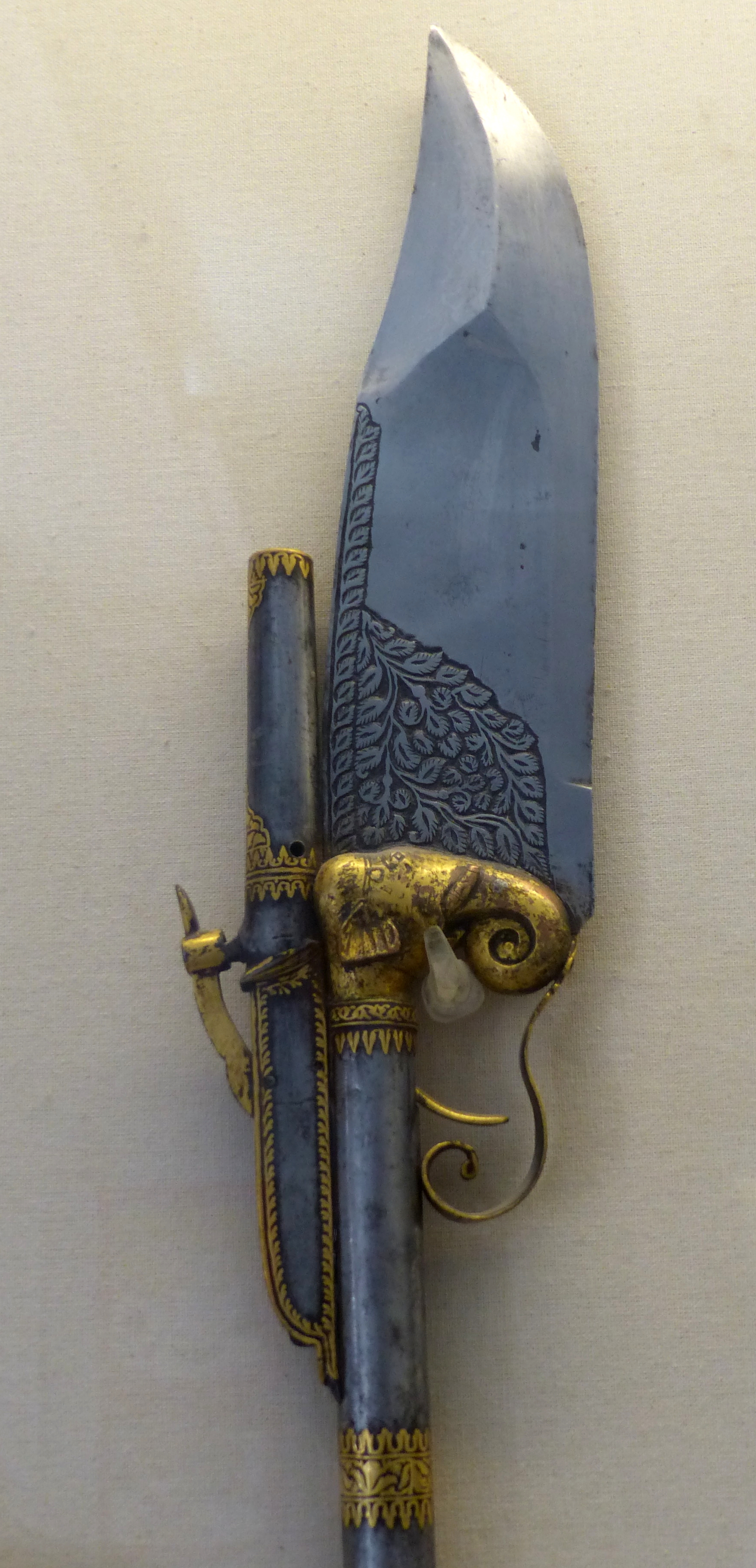

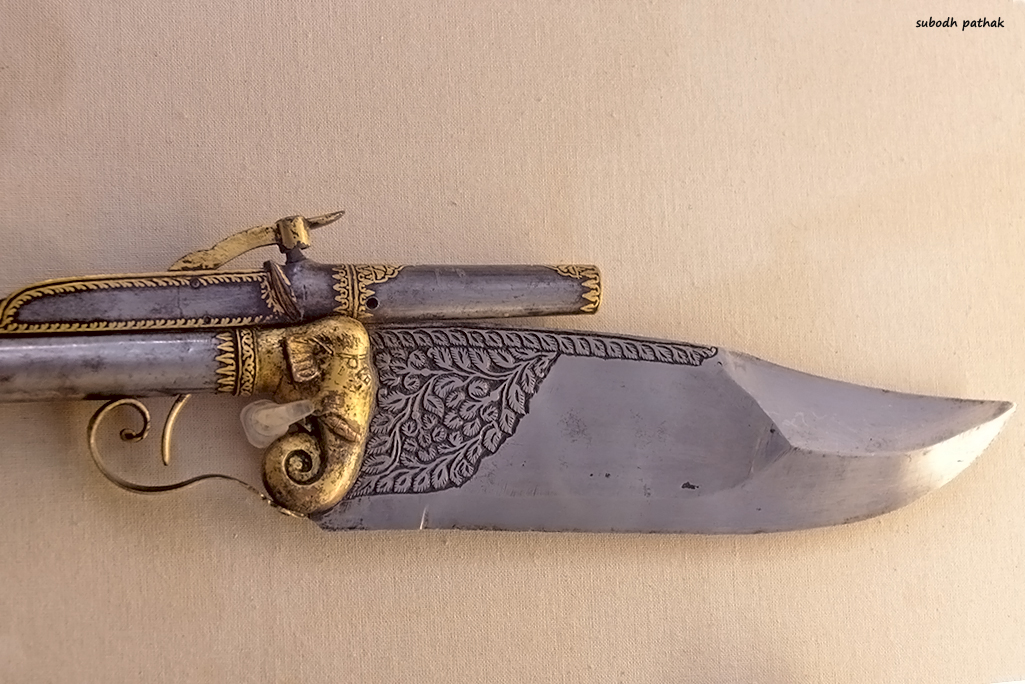

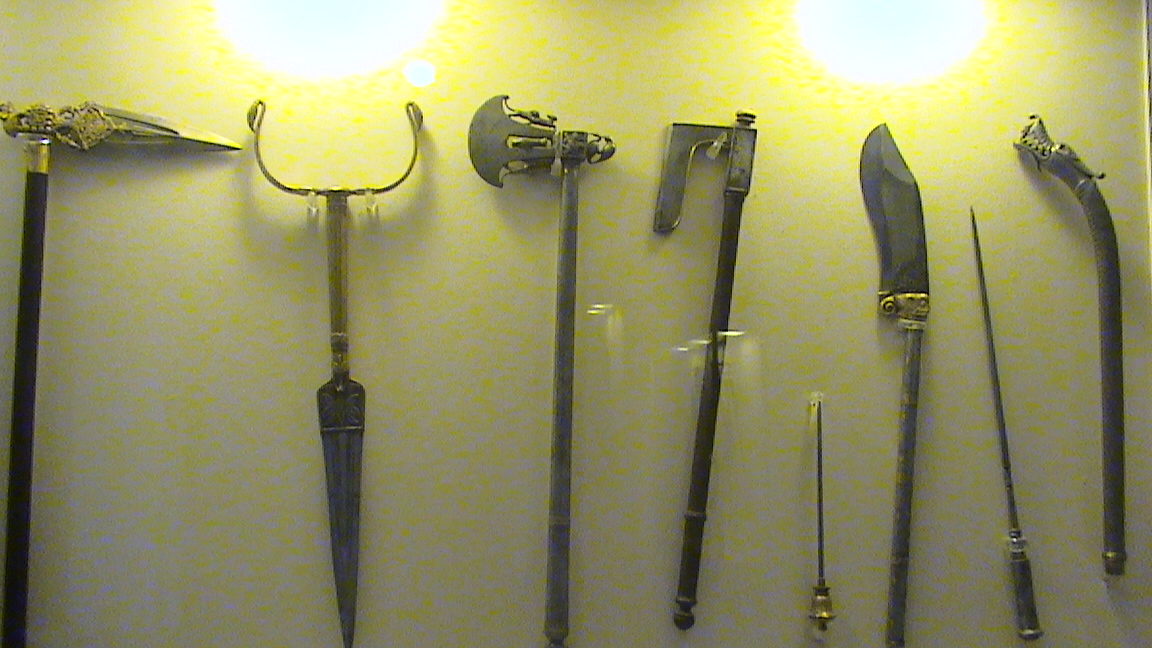

== Sources ==
- The complete encyclopedia of arms and weapons, Edited by Leonid Tarassuk and Claude Blair, Bonanza books (Crown)
- Dr Tobias Capwell (2009). The World Encyclopedia Of Knives, Daggers And Bayonets. Anness Publishing.
