= List of Saint Seiya: The Lost Canvas chapters =

The Japanese manga series Saint Seiya: The Lost Canvas – Myth of Hades is written and illustrated by Shiori Teshirogi. It is based on the manga Saint Seiya, which was created, written and illustrated by Japanese author Masami Kurumada. The manga tells the story of the previous Holy War, taking place in the 18th century, 250 years before the original series, in the Saint Seiya universe. The Lost Canvas focuses on how an orphan named Tenma becomes one of Athena's 88 warriors known as Saints and finds himself in a war fighting against his best friend Alone who is revealed to be the reincarnation of Athena's biggest enemy, the god of the underworld Hades.

It was published by Akita Shoten in the Weekly Shōnen Champion magazine from August 24, 2006 until April 7, 2011 and was collected in twenty-five tankōbon. The first volume was published on December 12, 2006 and the twenty-fifth and final on May 6, 2011. A short story comprised in 40 pages, or gaiden, titled "Yuzuriha Chronicles: The Emblem of Blood" (ユズリハ外伝 血墨の紋, Yuzuriha Gaiden: Chizumi no mon) was published on October 16, 2009, in the issues 11 and 12 of Akita Shōten's Princess Gold magazine. TMS Entertainment also produced a series of twenty-six original video animations based on the manga between June 24, 2009 and July 11, 2011.

Additionally, the serialization of a new series of short stories titled Saint Seiya: The Lost Canvas – Anecdotes (聖闘士星矢 THE LOST CANVAS 外伝, Seinto Seiya: Za Rosuto Kyanbasu Gaiden), focusing on the Gold Saints of the 18th century presented in The Lost Canvas, has started, with the first chapter published on May 19, 2011. Its first volume was released in Japan on October 7, 2011. As of April 23, 2012, it was announced in the Shōnen Champion magazine that The Lost Canvas would cease being published weekly, becoming a monthly comic starting in June, and shifting publishing to the newly created magazine, Akita's Bessatsu Shōnen Champion, resuming publishing of the remaining Anecdotes chapters in that month.

== Volume list ==
No.	Japanese release date	Japanese ISBN
1	December 8, 2006	4-253-21221-2
1. "The Days We Lost" (失われし日々, "Ushinawareshi hibi"); 2. "It is a Promise!" (約束だ!!, "Yakusoku da!!"); 3. "Garland of Reunion" (再会の花輪, "Saikai no hanawa"); 4. "Defeated" (敗北, "Haiboku"); 5. "Cathedral" (大聖堂, "Daiseidō"); 6. "Awakening" (覚醒, "Kakusei")
During the Holy War from the 18th Century, Athena's soldiers known as Saints fight against the Specters from Hades. Bronze Saint Pegasus Tenma discovers that Hades is his best friend, Alone, and starts reminiscing about his childhood when they were both orphans in a small town from Italy two years ago. One day, one of the twelve most powerful Saints, Gold Saint Libra Dohko, meets Tenma while searching for Hades. Impressed by Tenma's ability to use Cosmo, the mystic force from the universe, Dohko invites Tenma to become one of Athena's Saints. In the Sanctuary in Greece, Tenma finds Alone's sister, Sasha, who is revealed to be Athena's reincarnation. During the next two years, Alone meets a woman named Pandora who recognizes him as Hades' reincarnation. Upon discovering who he is and coming to the belief that death is salvation, Alone gathers his Specters and prepares to start the Holy War against Athena.
2	March 8, 2007	978-4-253-21222-9
7. "Colleagues" (同胞, Dōhō); 8. "Reunion" (再会, Saikai); 9. "Separation" (決別, Ketsubetsu); 10. "Evil Castle" (魔城, Majō); 11. "Demon Stars" (魔星たち, Maseitachi); 12. "Mysterious Warrior" (謎の戦士, Nazo no senshi); 13. "Jamir" (ジャーミル, Jamīru); 14. "Yomotsu Hirasaka" (黄泉比良坂, Yomotsu hirasaka); 15. "Restricted" (拘束, Kōsoku)
Alone revives three middle-ranked Silver Saints to kill Sasha, but they are stopped by Dohko and another Gold Saint, Aries Shion. As a self-punishment for killing them, both Gold Saints command a group of Silver and Bronze Saints to search for Hades in Italy. Tenma finds that Alone is Hades, ending his flashback. Alone immediately kills Tenma and the other Saints are forced to leave, being overpowered by the Specters. One of the Bronze Saints survivors, Unicorn Yato, finds Tenma's corpse and meets a woman named Yuzuriha who takes them to the land of Jamir where her master, Hakurei, reveals that Tenma can be saved. He explains that the flower chain made by Sasha saved Tenma's soul, but he is now trapped in the Underworld. Hakurei takes Yato and Yuzuriha's souls to the Underworld and they both soon find Tenma imprisoned by a Specter, Mandrake Fyodor.
3	May 8, 2007	978-4-253-21223-6
16. "Partners" (仲間, Nakama); 17. "Puppeteer" (傀儡使い, Kugutsu tsukai); 18. "Poison Rose" (毒薔薇, Doku bara); 19. "Immune" (耐毒(レジスト), Rejisuto); 20. "Untamable" (孤高, Kokō); 21. "Withered" (散華, Sange); 22. "Flower and Rain" (花と雨, Hana to ame); 23. "Procession of Funeral Roses" (花葬列, Hana sōretsu); 24. "Two News" (二つの知らせ, Futatsu no shirase)
With Yato and Yuzuriha's help, Tenma defeats the Specter and escapes from the prison. Meanwhile, Alone sends a group of Specters to attack the Sanctuary, but they are stopped by a Gold Saint, Pisces Albafica, who kills most of them. The commander from the Specters, a Judge of Hell, Gryphon Minos, faces and defeats Albafica without major problems. Minos then proceeds to attack a small village near the Sanctuary but he is confronted by Shion. Despite his wounds, Albafica goes to the village and faces Minos once again. This time, Albafica defeats Minos, but both of them die shortly after. Following these events, the Pope of the Sanctuary is informed by one of Hakurei's students, Atla, that the Specters are being revived by Alone.
4	July 7, 2007	978-4-253-21224-3
25. "Hell" (冥界, Meikai); 26. "Meeting" (邂逅, Kaikō); 27. "Sinner" (大罪人, Daizainin); 28. "Reason" (理, Kotowari); 29. "Treasures of Heavens" (天舞宝輪, Tenbu Hōrin); 30. "Sapindus Tree" (木欒子, Mokurenji); 31. "Return to Life" (生還, Seikan); 32. "The Essence of the Cosmo" (小宇宙の真髄, Kosumo no shinsui); 33. "Immortal Warriors" (不死の戦士, Fushi no senshi)
As Tenma, Yato and Yuzuriha search a tree from the Underworld, they are confronted by Alone, who tells them that he will invade the Sanctuary. Then, the Gold Saint Virgo Asmita starts using his Cosmo to fight Tenma although his physical body is in the Sanctuary. Asmita tests Tenma's abilities to know if he can defeat Alone since his previous incarnations were the ones who always faced Hades. After a long fight, Asmita disappears and Tenma, Yato and Yuzuriha return to Jamir. Using fruits from the Underworld, Asmita starts creating a rosary to seal the Specters' soul, ending their immortality. While Asmita is making it, a group of Specters attack Jamir. Tenma, Yato and Yuzuriha proceed to fight, allowing Asmita to complete the rosary.
5	September 7, 2007	978-4-253-21225-0
34. "Vicissitudes" (流転, Ruten); 35. "Aldebaran" (巨星, Arudebaran); 36. "Fierce Warrior" (凶戦士, Kyōsenshi); 37. "Black Flames" (黒い炎, Kuroi Honō); 38. "Motion of Fire" (迅炎, Den'en); 39. "It is Not Effective!!" (効かん!!, Kikan!!); 40. "Loneliness" (孤独, Kodoku); 41. "Wail" (慟哭, Dōkoku); 42. "Descent" (降臨, Kōrin)
Asmita seals the Specters' soul attacking Jamir inside the newly formed rosary, but his body is consumed in the process. Meanwhile, Specter Bennu Kagaho attacks the Sanctuary to kill Dohko, who injured Alone during their previous encounter in Italy. Gold Saint Taurus Aldebaran stands against Kagaho and fights him. Although Aldebaran defeats the Specter, he spares his life as he notes that Kagaho is not evil. When Aldebaran goes to inform to the Pope about the recent events, Alone invades the Sanctuary.
6	November 8, 2007	978-4-253-21226-7
43. "Return" (帰還, Kikan); 44. "God and Man" (神と人, Kami to hito); 45. "Sealed Land" (封印の地, Fūin no chi); 46. "Pandora" (パンドラ, Pandora); 47. "Lost Canvas" (ロストキャンバス, Rosuto Kyanbasu); 48. "Shadow" (影, Kage); 49. "Killers" (刺客, Shikaku); 50. "Live Bravely!" (強く生きろ!!, Tsuyoku ikiro!!); 51. "Bad Omen" (不穏の兆し, Fuon no kizashi)
Alone paralyzes all Saints from the Sanctuary, and impales Sagittarius Sisyphos's heart. Tenma is transported to the Sanctuary to fight Alone, but he is unable to inflict any damage. Before Tenma is killed, Sasha and the Pope try to seal Alone in the Sanctuary using Athena's statue. Pandora frees Alone, who reveals to Sasha and Tenma that he is painting The Lost Canvas, a picture all over the world that will destroy it once it is finished. Alone decides to leave, but Pandora sends two Specters to kill Tenma, being worried by his behavior. Aldebaran protects Tenma, although he is still injured by Kagaho. In the end, the Specters and Aldebaran die in battle.
7	February 8, 2008	978-4-253-21227-4
52. "Determination" (決意, Ketsui); 53. "Imprisonment" (幽閉, Yūhei); 54. "The Journey Starts" (旅立ち, Tabidachi); 55. "Twin Gods" (二神, Nijin); 56. "Forest of the Dead" (死の森, Shi no mori); 57. "Temptation" (誘惑, Yūwaku); 58. "I Will Not Run Away!" (逃げねぇ!, Nigenee!); 59. "Manipulator of Corpses" (死人使い, Shijin tsukai); 60. "Queen of Flies" (蠅の女王, Hae no joō)
Tenma tries to leave the Sanctuary to avoid the Specters kill his friends, but he is imprisoned by the Gold Saint Cancer Manigoldo. At the same time, the twin gods Hypnos and Thanatos seal Alone away to make him focus only on the Lost Canvas. The gods also protect Alone's cathedral to keep anybody from interrupting them. Soon, Hakurei sends Yuzuriha and Yato to free Tenma, and the three go to the cathedral to find Alone. However, they're attacked by several creatures created by the Specter Nasu Veronica, who tries to kill them. As the Saints defeat Veronica's soldiers, Manigoldo faces Veronica, as he was ordered to protect Tenma.
8	April 8, 2008	978-4-253-21228-1
61. "Lightning Attack!" (速攻!, Sokkō!); 62. "Sekishiki" (鬼火, onibi); 63. "Irruption" (突入!, Totsunyū); 64. "Gods and Pawns" (神と駒, Kami to koma); 65. "Master and Disciple" (師弟, Shitei); 66. "Phantasmagoria" (走馬灯, Sōmatō); 67. "Divine Land" (荒神, Aragami); 68. "Lost Body" (渾身, Konshin); 69. "Ploy" (一念, Ichinen)
Manigoldo easily kills Veronica, who before dying transports the Gold Saint to the church where the God of Death, Thanatos, confronts him. Manigoldo Thanatos, but none of his attacks injure him. As Thanatos tries to make Manigoldo explode in another dimension, Manigoldo's teacher, the Pope Sage, comes to help his student. Joining their forces, Manigoldo and Sage manage to fight Thanatos, but Manigoldo dies while destroying Thanatos' human body in another dimension. Using the Altar Silver Cloth from his brother Hakurei, Sage seals Thanatos' soul, but he also dies in the attack.
9	June 6, 2008	978-4-253-21229-8
70. "Ideals Carried On" (託された想い, Takusareta omoi); 71. "Laceration" (斬撃!, Zangeki); 72. "The Lineage of Dreams" (夢の眷族, Yume no kenzoku); 73. "Dreamworld" (夢界, Mukai); 74. "Discomfort" (違和感, Iwakan); 75. "Deeper Desire" (本心, Honshin); 76. "Return Match" (再戦, Saisen); 77. "Sharpening" (研ぎ澄ませ!, Togisumase!); 78. "Poppy of the Dreams World" (夢界の芥子, Mukai no keshi)
Gold Saint Capricorn El Cid is sent to protect Tenma to the cathedral, but he is attacked by Hypnos' children, the four Dream Gods. The Dream Gods mutilate El Cid's right arm, and throw his body into a cliff. Then, the Dream Gods attack Tenma, Yuzuriha and Yato, sending all of them to the Dreamworld, where they will sleep forever. El Cid manages to recover and enters the Dreamworld, killing two Dream Gods while recovering his arm. Sasha tries to enter the Dreamworld and help Tenma to wake up, barely managing to succeed. Tenma then faces and defeats Morpheus using the power from the Dreamworld.
10	August 8, 2008	978-4-253-21230-4
79. "Oneiros, God of Dreams" (夢神オネイロス, Mushin Oneirosu); 80. "Four Souls" (四つの魂, Yottsu no tamashii); 81. "I Will Take Him Down!" (ぶっ飛べ!, Buttobe!); 82. "Path of Loyalty" (大義の道, Taigi no michi); 83. "Common Fight" (共闘, Kyōtō); 84. "Trigger" (引き金, Hikigane); 85. "Pain" (痛み, Itami); 86. "Union for Victory" (勝利への結束, Shōri e no kessoku); 87. "Flash" (一閃, Issen)
El Cid reunites with Tenma, and both confront the last Dream God, Oneiros. As Oneiros uses the souls of his siblings, he is soon able to overpower the Saints. While Oneiros faces Tenma and El Cid, Sasha returns to the Dreamworld, where she manages to make Sisyphos wake up from his coma. Sisyphos then shoots a golden arrow at Oneiros, which El Cid is able to cut into four pieces to attack all the Dream Gods. Oneiros then tries to kill Tenma, but El Cid intercepts to slay Oneiros, although El Cid also dies.
11	November 7, 2008	978-4-253-21511-4
88. "Evil" (邪悪, Ja'aku); 89. "Marching Forward" (決意の出陣, Ketsui no shutsujin); 90. "Fate Again" (因縁再び, Innen futatabi); 91. "Tenacity of the Warrior" (戦士の執念, Senshi no shūnen); 92. "Final Destination" (因縁決着, Innen ketchaku); 93. "The God Beyond Reach" (遥かな神, Haruka na kami); 94. "Deadly Present" (死の贈り物, Shi no okurimono); 95. "A Patch to Escape" (活路, Katsuro); 96. "Toward the End" (終末の前に, Shūmatsu no mae ni)
With the Dream Gods dead, Hakurei sends all Saints to the cathedral to prepare to fight Hades. As a barrier from the cathedral binds the Saints' Cosmos, Hakurei enters alone to the cathedral to destroy the barrier. Shion and Yuzuriha secretly follow him, but both are attacked by Hypnos. Hakurei reunites the souls from all the Saints that fought in the previous Holy War, and manages to seal Hypnos. Before Hakurei can destroy the barrier, Alone appears and kills him having become more corrupted with Hades' soul. Tenma and Dohko fight the new Hades, but both are unable to hurt him. As such, Dohko stays to fight Hades, allowing Shion to escape with Tenma and Yuzuriha. After Dohko is defeated, Hades goes to the sky to finish The Lost Canvas.
12	February 6, 2009	978-4-253-21512-1
97. "Canon Island's Demon" (カノン島の鬼, Kanon-tō no oni); 98. "Scorching Test" (灼熱の試練, Shakunetsu no shiren); 99. "Last Lesson" (最終課題, Saishū kadai); 100. "Eruption" (噴火, Funka); 101. "Bluegrad" (ブルーグラード, Burūgurādo); 102. "Atlantis" (アトランティス, Atorantisu); 103. "Wrath" (怒り, Ikari); 104. "The Poison of the Scorpion" (蠍の毒, Sasori no doku); 105. "The Origin of Power" (力の糧, Chikara no kate)
Tenma goes to train to Canon Island to train a man named Defteros tells him if he does not become one with that island, he will devour him. Tenma is successful in his training achieving the Gold Saints' powers, while Defteros is revealed to be the Gemini Gold Saint. Meanwhile, in Sanctuary, Aquarius Dégel goes alongside Scorpio Kardia on a mission to Bluegrad to find a power to reach the Lost Canvas where Hades is situated. Unity, the prince of that country and Dégel's old friend, meets them. He explains Bluegrad was destroyed by the Specters, and reveals a passage that leads to Atlantis. In the submarine realm, Unity is killed by the Judged Specter Wyvern Radamanthys who came to stop them. Kardia says he would fight Radamanthys in his comrade's place, and Dégel should go after Poseidon and fulfill that mission.
13	April 8, 2009	978-4-253-21513-8
106. "Heart" (心臓, Shinzō); 107. "Antares" (アンタレス, Antaresu); 108. "Reunion at the Bottom of the Sea" (海底の再会, Kaitei no saikai); 109. "The Marina Unity" (海闘士ユニティ, Marīna Yuniti); 110. "Like Best Friends" (親友として, Shin'yū toshite); 111. "Deliverance" (解放, Kaihō); 112. "Freezing Coffin" (氷の棺, Kōri no hitsugi); 113. "Future" (生きる, Ikiru); 114. "Lightspeed Punch" (光速拳, Kōsoku ken)
During the battle between Kardia and Radamanthys, the latter has the upper hand first but is defeated shortly after. Kardia's heart stopps too and his cosmo vanishes. Dégel gets to the entrance of the underwater realm and sees Seraphina, the older sister of Unity. The same moment a mariner steps forward and greets the Aquarius Saint. Dégel recognize him as his old friend Unity, who now dons the Sea Dragon Scale. Unity explains how he reached to his position and that after Seraphina died he wanted her to be the vessel for the underwater god. Offering Dégel the Orichalcum in exchange of the freeing of Athena's seal over Poseidon, the Gold Saint cannot accept and the fight between them starts. This time Dégel uses full force and defeats the Mariner. Unity regains his senses and wants to help Dégel but Pandora destroys part of the Orichalcum and Poseidon is set loose. Dégel has no other choice, than sending Unity back to Sanctuary with the intact part of the stone and use his powers to freeze whole Atlantis, the possessed Serphina and himself. While the battle in Atlantis waged a small troop of Sanctuary Soldiers and Bronze Saint were sent out to retrieve the ship of hope, the Argo.
14	June 8, 2009	978-4-253-21514-5
115. "Repairs" (修復, Shūfuku); 116. "Vanguard" (先陣, Senjin); 117. "Monster" (化物, Monsutā); 118. "Wild Beasts Collide" (野獣激突, Yajū gekitotsu); 119. "The Young Lion" (若獅子, Wakajishi); 120. "Innate Talent" (天性, Tensei); 121. "To Overcome" (超える, Koeru); 122. "Perseverance" (意地, Iji); 123. "Bonds" (絆, Kizuna)
While the Bronze Saints work in the Argo, the Specter Behemoth Violate spots and her superior, the Judge Garuda Aiacos, orders her to eliminate the Saints. As Violate prepares to finish the Bronze Saints Leo Regulus comes to the Saints' defense and starts fighting her. Regulus manages to make both stay away from the Argo but Violate's attack was just meant to keep Regulus busy while Aiacos' army directly attack the ship. Following Violate's death at the hands of her opponent, Aiacos prepares to kill the Saints, but Tenma and Sisyphos come to their aid.
15	August 7, 2009	978-4-253-21515-2
124. "Now Together!" (今、一つに, Ima, hitotsu ni); 125. "Crystallization of Thoughts" (思いの結晶, Omoi no kesshō); 126. "Showdown of the Great Opponents" (両雄対峙, Ryōyū Taiji); 127. "The Ship of Darkness Vs. the Ship of Hope" (黒船VS希望の船, Kurofune bāsasu kibō no fune); 128. "As a Leader" (将として, Shō toshite); 129. "Cruelty" (非道, Hidō); 130. "Like a Shield" (盾として, Tate toshite); 131. "The Fall of Garuda" (カルーダ墜つ, Garūda otsu); 132. "Punisher" (仕置人, Shiokinin)
While Sisyphos stops Aiacos' attacks, four Bronze Saints working in the ship sacrifice their lives to use the Orichalcum sent by Tenma to make Argo start flying and fight against Aiacos' warship. As Yato is controlling Argo, Sisyphos stays alongside Tenma to protect it from Aiacos' attacks. Unable to refuse defeat in the fight between ships Aiacos make the two of them collide and continues fighting Sisyphos one-on-one. Overpowered by Aiacos, Sisyphos sacrifices his eyesight to enhance his Cosmo and defeat the opposing Judge. Shortly afterwards, Hades tries to kill Aiacos using Violate's dead body as a punishment, but he is opposed by Tenma.
16	October 8, 2009	978-4-253-21516-9
133. "Decisions" (覚悟, Kakugo); 134. "Burst of Life" (命の爆発, Inochi no bakuhatsu); 135. "Final Point" (終止符, Shūshifu); 136. "Desired Outcome" (望む結末, Nozomu Ketsumatsu); 137. "Demon Temples of the Stars" (星の魔宮, Hoshi no makyū); 138. "Diabolical Harp" (魔琴, Makin); 139. "Feather of Yruth" (真実の羽, Shinjitsu no hane); 140. "Beyond Loyalty" (貫く忠義, Tsuranuku chūgi); 141. "Back to Action" (決起, Kekki)
Tenma starts fighting Hades but is not able to defeat him. Sasha comes to assist Tenma and two start sending the blood Sasha's loses in the fight to the underworld god, overwhelming him. Before Hades is defeated, Pandora saves him and tries to kill the two. However, Hades interrupts Pandora and invites Tenma and Sasha to the Demonic Temples, temples located within the Lost Canvas. As the Saints prepare to enter the Temples, they are stopped by the gatekeeper, the Specter Sphynx Pharaoh. Despite his wounds, Sisyphos stands against Pharaoh, using his last forces to kill the gatekeeper and assist Shion and Regulus in destroying the entrance with Athena Exclamation.
17	December 8, 2009	978-4-253-21517-6
142. "Goodbye in the Sea of Clouds" (雲海の別れ, Unkai no wakare); 143. "Ferryman" (渡し守, Watashimori); 144. "Athena Sealed" (女神の封印, Atena no fūin); 145. "Way Down the Sanctuary" (聖城へ, Sankuchuari e); 146. "Athena's Cloth" (アテナの聖衣, Atena no kurosu); 147. "The Strongest Weapon" (最強の武器, Saikyō no buki); 148. "Scent of Blood" (血の匂い, Chi no nioi); 149. "Poisoned Wind" (毒の風, Doku no kaze); 150. "Isolated Wings" (孤高の羽, Kokō no hane)
Following Sisyphos' death, Sasha and the Saints enter into the Lost Canvas. However, all of the people within Argo except Tenma, Sasha, Shion and Regulus are petrified as a result of the area's power. A ferryboat Specter named Acheron Charon agrees to take Tenma's group to the first Demonic Temple but at the cost of Sasha's hair. With the Lost Canvas' souls taking Sasha's hair, Hades is able to seal the goddess' Cosmo. Meanwhile, Dohko has been saved from death by Gemini Defteros who found him in the Kanon Island and goes to the Sanctuary to obtain Athena's Cloth using her blood. Near Athena's statue, Dohko is confronted by Specters who know of Defteros' intentions and try to kill him. Dohko defeats his opponents but is faced by Kagaho who previously took him to Kanon Island, knowing of Athena's Cloth.
18	March 8, 2010	978-4-253-21518-3
151. "The Cloth's Rebirth" (聖衣争奪, Kurosu sōdatsu); 152. "Traitor" (裏切り者, Uragirimono); 153. "Replica" (模造品, Repurika); 154. "Satanic Fist" (魔拳, Maken); 155. "A Play of a Murder" (暗殺劇, Ansatsu geki); 156. "Sin" (罪, Tsumi); 157. "Like a Demon" (鬼の如く, Oni no gotoku); 158. "Incomplete" (半端, Hanpa); 159. "Annihilation" (消滅, Shōmetsu)
Having been infused with Athena's blood by Defteros, Dohko's blood awakens Athena's Cloth upon being attacked by Kagaho. Before Kagaho can steal it, Defteros appears and transports Dohko and him to another area. Entrusting Dohko Athena's Cloth, Defteros is confronted by the person who told Hades about the Cloth, his late twin Gemini Aspros. Revived by Hades, Aspros transports his brother to the Mars Temple where he acts as one of Hades' guardians. As the two start fighting, it is revealed that Aspros was the original Gemini Saint and a candidate for Pope who was tested by Hakurei by rejecting his wish. Still wishing his position, Aspros brainwashed Defteros to kill Hakurei, but the two were also opposed by Virgo Asmita. Asmita managed to give the brainwashed Defteros a clue to stop his brother's control which was killing Aspros himself. Now confronting once again as enemies, Defteros uses all his powers to kill the person he admired the most once again. However, at the end Defteros dies and then Aspros' appearance drastically changes.
19	May 7, 2010	978-4-253-21519-0
160. "The Shape We Were Supposed to Have" (あるべき姿, Arubeki sugata); 161. "Mephistopheles" (メフィストフェレス, Mefisutoferesu); 162. "Father" (父親, Chichioya); 163. "But a Drop" (されど一滴, Saredo itteki); 164. "Human Pain" (人の痛み, Hito no itami); 165. "Salvation" (救済, Kyūsai); 166. "One's Place" (居場所, Ibasho); 167. "The Hour of Salvation" (救済の刻, Kyūsai no koku); 168. "Authority" (統治者, Tōchisha)
Aspros returns to Hades' palace revealing that Defteros actually sacrificed his life to erase the evil within his side by merging their souls. Having regained his status as the Gemini Saint, Aspros tries to kill Hades but is stopped by the Specter Mephistopheles Yōma who is responsible for the hatred between the two Gemini Saints. After disintegrating Aspros' body, Yōma goes to the first Demon Temple, Mercury, where he reveals to be Tenma's father. Yōma neither fights his nor his comrades, stating they are the "actors" he placed in his "stage play", having stolen Hades as a newborn to leave with Sasha and Tenma. After Yōma leaves the Temple, Alone claims he has been controlling Hades' power since the beginning and kills all his Skeletons, enraging Pandora. Meanwhile, Tenma's group reaches the second Temple, Venus, and are opposed by the guardian Balron René who Shion wishes to fight alone.
20	July 8, 2010	978-4-253-21520-6
169. "Playground" (遊戯場, Yūgijō); 170. "Lived History" (生きた歴史, Ikita rekishi); 171. "Heir" (継承者, Keishōsha); 172. "Cocytus" (氷結地獄, Kokyūtosu); 173. "Roar of History" (歴史の咆哮, Rekishi no hōkō); 174. "Tombstone" (墓石, Boseki); 175. "Duty" (役目, Yakume); 176. "Hour of the Beast" (獣の時間, Kemono no jikan); 177. "Demon of Flames" (炎の魔人, Honō no Majin)
While Shion continues his fight against René, it is revealed how the Specter offered him to join his side to spy people's lives in the past if he broke all the Cloths he was supposed to protect. With Shion having refused the offer as he believed that people's wounds and Cloth are better than René's records, René sends Shion to Cocytus to see the corpses of all the Saints who fought in previous wars to reveal their suffering. Shion is instead encouraged by the late Saints to use their souls in an attack to kill his opponent. Meanwhile, Tenma, Regulus and Sasha reach the Terra Temple where Kagaho confronts them. Dohko meets his comrades and decides to fight Kagaho once again before giving Sasha Athena's Cloth. As Kagaho is draining his life to increase his power for Alone's sake, Dohko is forced to use a suicidal technique to defeat him.
21	September 8, 2010	978-4-253-21539-8
178. "Red Flames" (赤き炎, Akaki honō); 179. "Immortal Bird" (不死鳥, Fushichō); 180. "Disciplining" (調教, Chōkyō); 181. "Master" (主君, Shukun); 182. "Loyalty" (忠誠, Chūsei); 183. "As a Specter" (冥闘士として, Supekutā toshite); 184. "Three vs. Three" (三対三, San tai San); 185. "As Long As There Is Life" (生命ある限り, Seimei aru kagiri); 186. "Ashen Day" (灰色の日, Hai'iro no Hi); 187. "Partita" (パルティータ, Parutīta)
With Dohko's final technique the two warriors are sent flying upwards at high speed, to be burnt by atmospheric friction. Kagaho remembers about how he swore to protect Alone who reminded him of his late brother and how the Saints might be able to save Alone. As a result, Kagaho sends Dohko back to Earth before his death. Back in the Saturnus Temple, Pandora wishes to take Rhadamanthys once again to fight, but she is opposed by his followers Harpy Valentine who is against using his superior's life. As the two struggle, Rhadamanthys manages to control the blood Alone gave him and kills Valentine as he will fight for Hades' sake. Rhadamanthys, Pandora and Cait Sith Cheshire fight Tenma, Sasha and Regulus in the Saturnus Temple where Sasha dons Athena's Cloth. While fighting Sasha, Pandora reveals how her friend Partita, who was actually Tenma's mother, had her brother stolen from her. Yōma is revealed as the culprit as he sends Tenma to the Uranus Temple to face his mother.
22	December 8, 2010	978-4-253-21540-4
188. "Mother's Eyes" (母の目, Haha no me); 189. "Decision" (決断, Ketsudan); 190. "Emptiness" (むき出し, Mukidashi); 191. "My Soul" (俺の魂, Ore no tamashii); 192. "God Cloth" (神聖衣, Goddo Kurosu); 193. "Path to Follow" (進むべき道, Susumu beki michi); 194. "The Lion's Memories" (獅子の記憶, Shishi no kioku); 195. "Ilias" (イリアス, Iriasu); 196. "The Day of Destiny" (運命の日, Unmei no hi)
Now acting as a Specter, Partita tries to kill Tenma in order to have Pegasus' power that can defeat the gods. With Tenma unwilling to fight his mother, Pandora steps in but is severely wounded. Before Pandora is killed, Tenma decides to fight Partita but the Pegasus Cloth is destroyed in the process. Partita starts removing her son's soul, but it returns to his body alongside the broken Cloth, which join together to form the Pegasus God Cloth, enabling Tena to defeat Partita. Back in the Saturnus Temple, Regulus reveals how he wishes to avenge his father, the previous Leo Saint Ilias, who was killed by Rhadamanthys in one of the Specters' attacks several years ago.
23	February 8, 2011	978-4-253-21641-8
197. "New Star" (新しい星, Atarashii hoshi); 198. "Extreme" (究極, Kyūkyoku); 199. "Surpass!" (超える！, Koeru!); 200. "Dialogue with Earth" (大地と語る, Daichi to kataru); 201. "Seeker" (探し人, Sagashi jin); 202. "Love and Sorrow" (愛と哀しみ, Ai to kanashimi); 203. "What Must Be Done" (成すべきこと, Nasu beki koto); 204. "Just Being with Him" (ただ傍に, Tada hata ni); 205. "Athena's Attack" (アテナ出撃, Atena shutsugeki)
Despite having analyzed Rhadamanthys' attacks back when his father was killed, Regulus is still unable to defeat the Specter who obtained divine powers from Alone. Rhadamanthys then prepares to kill Regulus who becomes an incorporeal entity to pierce his opponent's heart and remove his divine powers. As Regulus leaves to the afterlife, Pandora goes to Alone to kill him for manipulating Hades' powers. Neither she nor the severely wounded Rhadamanthys are able to defeat Alone, but Rhadamanthys uses his last forces to break the painting sealing Sasha's powers and make Pandora leave the area. Having regained her strength, Sasha releases her petrified comrades and leaves to fight Alone. Meanwhile, Yōma ambushes Shion but at the same time he is confronted by Tenma.
24	April 8, 2011	978-4-253-21642-5
206. "Future" (未来, Mirai); 207. "Demon Brothers" (鬼兄弟, Oni kyōdai); 208. "God of Time" (時の神, Toki no kami); 209. "Kairos" (カイロス, Kairosu); 210. "The Curtain Falls" (幕引き, Maku biki); 211. "One Human" (一人の人間, Hidari no ningen); 212. "Gathering" (集結, Shūketsu); 213. "Answer" (答え, Kotae); 214. "Alone" (アローン, Arōn)
Yōma reveals his plans to use Tenma's new powers to start a war against the gods rather than allowing a future generation to do it, but requires Shion's death to accomplish such future. Having survived from Yōma's attack, Aspros saves Shion's life and gives his unconscious body alongside Dohko's to Tenma while he once again fights the Specter. During the battle, Yōma is revealed to be Kairos a lesser god who was banished by his brother Chronos in the ages of myth and is trapped within the a mortal body. Learning his opponent is not a complete god, Aspros manages to destroy Yōma's body in the Heavenly Realm and seals his soul within Asmita's 108 beads mala. Shortly afterwards, Aspros' temporary life as a Specter reaches its end while Tenma and Sasha engage Alone who is now using Hades' Surplice. Still hearing the original Alone's voice asking for his help, Tenma decides to fight Alone one-on-one.
25	May 6, 2011	978-4-253-21643-2
215. "Conclusion" (結論, Ketsuron); 216. "Voices" (声, Koe); 217. "Forward" (真っ直ぐ, Massugu); 218. "Back to Those Days!" (あの日へ!, Ano hi e!); 219. "True Darkness" (真の闇, Shin no yami); 220. "Golden Light" (黄金の光, Ōgon no Hikari); 221. "United Garland" (つながる花輪, Tsunagaru Hanawa); 222. "The Three Reunited" (3人一緒, San nin issho); 223. "The Future Has Begun" (始まる未来, Hajimaru mirai); Epilogue. "243 Years Later" (243年後, 243 nen go)
The souls from The Lost Canvas make Tenma stop fighting as they wish for Alone's salvation. With Tenma having lost his will to fight, Alone prepares to finish him, but Yato and the remaining Saints come to his aid. Encouraged by Yato and Yuzuriha to continue fighting, Tenma defeats Alone, causing the Lost Canvas' destruction and at the same time Hades' complete possession over Alone's body. Shion calls for the remaining ten Gold Cloths to gather and join him and Dohko to use all their golden light to weaken the Underworld God. Hades' soul retreats to the last Demonic Temple, Pluton, and Tenma, Sasha, and the now safe Alone joins forces to defeat the god. Despite their victory, the trio does not return to Earth, leaving Shion and Dohko to prepare for the next Holy War with Shion becoming the new Pope to rebuild the Sanctuary and Dohko sealing the 108 souls from Asmita's rosary in Mount Lu's five peaks.

== Anecdotes chapters ==
No.	Title	Japanese release date	Japanese ISBN
1	Chapter One: Pisces	October 7, 2011	978-4-253-21644-9
1. "Solitude" (孤独, Kodoku); 2. "Child of the Gardens, Child of the Fields" (園の子 畑の子, Sono no ko, hata no ko); 3. "The Healer" (癒しの人, Iyashi no hito); 4. "Red Bond" (赤い絆, Akai kizuna); 5. "Blood Relative" (血族, Ketsuzoku); 6. "Pefko" (ペフコ, Pefuko); 7. "Dryad" (ドリュアス, Doryuasu); 8. "Red Lilies" (赤い鈴蘭, Akai suzuran); 9. "The Bonds of People" (人の絆, Hito no kizuna)
Some time before the Holy War of 1747, Pisces Albafica is sent by Sanctuary to investigate the suspected activity of Hades' Specters in the Healer's Island. Upon arriving, Albafica saves the life of young Pefko, apprentice to Luco, the master healer. The Pisces Saint discovers the blood ties between Luco and his late master Lugonis, who was Luco's brother. Luco offers freeing Albafica of his poisonous blood forever, but both Albafica and Pefko learn that Luco is a Specter working for Hades.
2	Chapter Two: Scorpio	December 8, 2011	978-4-253-21645-6
10. "The Scorpion and the Girl" (さそりと少女, Sasori to shōjo); 11. "The Little Goddess" (小さな女神, Chiisana megami); 12. "The Priest of Beasts" (獣の神官, Kemono no shinkan); 13. "The Flayer" (皮剥ぎの男, Kawahagi no otoko); 14. "Intense Pain and True Feelings" (激痛と実感, Gekitsū to jikkan); 15. "Citlaloizca" (祭祀の日, Shitorarohizuka); 16. "I Am No Longer Cold" (もう寒くない, Mou samukunai); 17. "Going Beyond Limits" (絶頂突破, Zecchō toppa); 18. "Birth of the Goddess" (女神誕生, Megami tanjō); "Extra Track: Scorpion's Interlude" (エクストラトラック・スコーピオンズインタールード, Ekusutora Torakku - Sukōpionzu Intārūdo)
After the long search for Athena comes to an end thanks to Sagittarius Sisyphos, Scorpio Kardia goes to take care of her unaware Sasha is the goddess. Taking out the young goddess for a promenade, Kardia stumbles across the ancient Jaguar fighters who plan to resurrect their god, the fearsome sun god of destruction Tezcatlipoca, to unleash chaos into the world. Wesda, the sun priest, discovers the enormous power hidden within Kardia's heart, and desires to take it as an offering for his god, as well as Athena's, who is then kidnapped.
3	Chapter Three: Aquarius	February 8, 2012	978-4-253-21646-3
19. "The Magician of Ice" (氷の魔術師, Kōri no majutsushi); 20. "The Garneted Jewelry Box" (石榴石の宝石箱, Zakuroishi no hōsekibako); 21. "Flint" (火打石, Furinto); 22. "Father and Mentor Vanished" (消えた父と師, Kieta chichi to shi); 23. "The Gaze of Kōh-i-Nūr" (光の山の眺め, Kō-ī-Nūru no nagame); 24. "Tourmaline and Chalcedony" (電気石と玉髄, Torumarin to Karusedonī); 25. "Garnet's Secret" (石榴石の秘密, Gānetto no himitsu); 26. "Deep in the Jewelry Box" (宝石ā箱深部, Hōsekibako shinbu); 27. "Ice Coffin" (冰の棺, Kōri no hitsugi)
Five years before the holy war of 1747, Aquarius Dégel receives a mysterious invitation card. Accepting it, the Gold Saint meets a mysterious woman of the high society of France named Garnet. Intrigued by the unnatural aura that surrounds the woman, Dégel later finds out she is responsible for the vanishings of locals, including the father of the young maid Fluorite. Determined to put an end to the situation, Dégel infiltrates Garnet's fortress, only to find that she is also responsible for the corruption of his revered mentor, the five-hundred-year-old Krjest, whom he is shocked to encounter as a young man.
4	Chapter Four: Cancer	April 6, 2012	978-4-253-21647-0
28. "Heads/Tails" (表/裏, Omote/Ura); 29. "Nero" (暗黒, Nēro); 30. "Black Saint" (暗黒聖闘士, Burakku Seinto); 31. "Black Whale" (黒き鯨, Burakku Hoēru); 32. "Black Crow (黒き烏, Burakku Kurō); 33. "Black Hound" (黒き猟犬, Burakku Haundo); 34. "Soul Fortress" (霊魂の要塞, Souru Fōtoresu); 35. "Black Altar" (暗黒聖壇星座, Burakku Arutā); 36. "Feelings of Master and Disciple" (師弟の思い, Shitei no omoi)
Sanctuary dispatches Cancer Manigoldo and Pisces Albafica to investigate suspicious activity in Venice. Upon arrival, a carnival atmosphere greets them, as well as young Gioca's attempt at robbing Manigoldo. Further indagation leads the Saints to the lair of the Nero, a criminal organization formed by Black Saints who conspire to steal the Gold Cloths and take over Sanctuary, at the same time harboring a particular interest on Gioca. It is up to the two Gold Saints to stop the ambitions of the Black Saints and protect their young companion to unravel the enigma of her origins and the reason of the interest of the Black Saints on her.
5	Chapter Five: Capricorn	July 6, 2012	978-4-253-21648-7
37. "Swordsmith" (刀鍛冶, Katanakaji); 38. "Thin but sharp sword" (あまぎれ, Amagire); 39. "The beautiful maiden of Catalania" (カタラニアの美姫, Katarania no Biki); 40. "Zan-ōki" (斬桜鬼, Zan-ōki; lit. 'murderous demon of the cherry blossom'); 41. "The black tide" (くろき潮流, Kuroki chōryū); 42. "Kind man" (優しき男, Yasashiki otoko); 43. "Unsheathed Sword" (抜き身, Nukimi); 44. "The Gods of Dreams" (夢神, Mushin); 45. "Oxidized Sword" (錆びた刀, Sabita katana)
During his mission to investigate the gods of dreams, Capricorn El Cid deviates temporarily to a mysterious city that appeared from thin air. He then enters a tournament held by enigmatic figures, that El Cid later finds to be deeply related to his past. In his quest to perfect his Excalibur attack, El Cid unearths memories of his training and secrets about the fearsome gods of dreams, at the same time, finding a young man who shows promise of becoming a true Saint.
6	Chapter Six: Libra	December 7, 2012	978-4-253-21680-7
46. "Fairyland" (仙境, Senkyō); 47. "Nine-tailed fox Huī" (九尾狐の灰, Kyūbi-ko no Fūi); 48. "Sparrow Mǔdān" (雀の牡丹, Suzume no Mūdan); 49. "Fei-gan of the sorrowful eyes" (悲しき瞳の飛眼, Kanashiki hitomi no Fei-gan); "Extra Track: Seeking the Truth" (エクストラトラック, Ekusutora Torakku - ~Seeking the Truth~)
Eleven years have passed since the end of the Holy War against Hades in the 18th century. Libra Dohko spends his days fulfilling the duty Athena gave him, to guard the seal of the Specter's grave. The Saint's routine comes to an end when he is greeted by a mysterious young man, Liú-Xīng, who bears an uncanny resemblance to Dohko's late comrade, Pegasus Tenma. Dohko then sees himself involved in a struggle against the Taonia, renowned warriors from China's fairylands who will stop at nothing to see their goals accomplished.
7	Chapter Seven: Leo	April 8, 2013	978-4-253-21681-4
50. "Balor of the evil eye" (魔眼のバロール, Magan no Barōru); 51. "Sorcerer of darkness and envoy of light" (闇の魔人と光の使者, Yami no Majin to Hikari no Shisha); 52. "Father's Shadow, The Light from Beyond" (父の影 その先の光, Chichi no Kage, Sono Saki no Hikari); 53. "The one that commands light" (光を司る者, Hikari o tsukasadoru mono); "Extra Track: The Way" (エクストラトラック- ザ・ウェイ ~The Way~, Ekusutora Torakku - Za Wei)
Like his father before him, young Leo Regulus has recently become one of the twelve Gold Saints of Athena. By chance, he meets a girl named Connor, the daughter of worshippers of the light god Lugh. Inadvertently, Regulus becomes involved in a struggle between the forces of good and evil, as devoted followers of both, and manifestations of ancient creatures of Irish legend, seek to destroy each other to fulfill their destinies.
8	Chapter Eight: Virgo	August 8, 2013	978-4-253-21682-1
54. The one who seeks the gods (神を求めし者, Kami o motomeshi mono); 55. Unreachable voice (届かぬ声, Todokanukoe); 56. The way of Nirvana (涅槃の理, Nehan no kotowari); 57. Intertwined destinies (縁, Enishi); "Extra Track: Encounter with Imitation of God" (エクストラトラック - エンカウンター・ウィズ・イミテーション・オブ・ゴッド ~encounter with imitation of GOD~, Ekusutora Torakku - Enkauntā wizu Imitēshon obu Goddo)
Years before the events of the Holy War of 1747, a young man named Ahimsa seeks to achieve enlightenment. His quest eventually leads him to cross paths with Asmita, the Virgo Gold Saint, who underwent, and overcame, Ahimsa's same trials years ago. Mysterious activities in the underworld make the young men descend together to the hellish Six Realms, which are under control of the wicked Āṭavaka, and Ahimsa's true awakening to reality begins, with the assistance of Asmita.
9	Chapter Nine: Taurus	December 6, 2013	978-4-253-21683-8
58. The Two Giant Stars (二人の巨星, Futari no Kyosei); 59. Blunt Fist (愚直なる拳, Guchokunaru Kobushi); 60. The ones we must protect (守るべきもの, Mamorubekimono); 61. Guardian (守護者, Shugosha); 62. The future (種子（みらい）, Mirai)
In 1753, six years after the victory against Hades, Athena's Sanctuary is still in the process of recovering. Only a handful of Saints protect the peace of the world in an era without Athena, among them the veteran Aries Shion and Taurus Teneo, who inherited the mantle of the Taurus Gold Saint from his mentor Rasgado. Strange activity causes the Pope Shion to dispatch Taurus Teneo to Mount Etna, the final resting place of the terrible monster Typhon and his brother, the giant Enceladus, after the devastating Titanomachia, millennia ago. Upon reaching his destination, Teneo reminisces after the dire battles his mentor endured in the place years before him, that prevented Typhon's evil from being once again unleashed upon the world.
10	Chapter Ten: Sagittarius	June 20, 2014	978-4-253-21684-5
63. The younger brother of a hero (英雄の弟, Eiyū no otōto); 64. Oracle (神託, Shintaku); 65. Bow and bowstring (弓と弦, Yumi to tsuru); 66. Promise (約束, Yakusoku); "Extra Track: Leo's Interlude" (エクストラトラック - レオズインタールード ~Leo's Interlude~, Ekusutora Torakku - Reozu Intārūdo)
11	Chapter Eleven: Gemini I	October 20, 2014	978-4-253-21685-2
67. Gold Shadow (黄金色の影(ゴールド・シャドウ), Gōrudo Shadou); 68. The wicked one (凶ツ者, Magatsumono); 69. Tears (涙, Namida); 70. Brothers (兄弟, Kyōdai); "Extra Track: Other dream"
12	Chapter Twelve: Gemini II	January 8, 2015	978-4-253-21686-9
71. Scar (瑕痕, Kizuato); 72. The one possessed by the devil star (魔星に魅入られし者, Masei ni miirareshi mono); 73. The one who transcends humanity (人を超越せし者, Hito o chōetsu seshi mono); 74. Resolution (覚悟, Kakugo); "Extra Track: Other dream"
13	Chapter Thirteen: Aries I	June 8, 2015	978-4-253-21687-6
75. Dreams of the Aries (牡羊が見る夢, Osu hitsuji ga miru yume); 76. A timeless messenger (時を超えた使者, Toki o koeta shisha); 77. Crossroads (クロス・ロード, Kurosu rōdo); 78. Turning point (ターニング・ポイント, Tāningu Pointo); "Extra Track: past → future"
14	Chapter Fourteen: Aries II	December 8, 2015	978-4-253-21688-3
79. Return (リターン, Ritān); 80. The Rebels (反抗者たち, Hankō Mono-tachi); 81. Clamp (クランプ, Kuranpo); "Extra Track: Yuzuriha Origins: Bonds of Blood (ユズリハ外伝 血墨の紋, Yuzuriha Gaiden: Chisumi no Mon)" "Extra Track: Continue to the Legend"
15	Chapter Fifteen: The Old Twins	March 8, 2016	978-4-253-21689-0
82. Shaken Sanctuary (揺れる聖域, Yuueru Seiiki); 83. Invasion (侵略, Shinryaku); 84. Traitor (裏切者, Uragirimono); 85. Sanctuary in turmoil (混迷の聖域, Konmei no Seiiki); "Extra Track: The Successor (ザ サクセサ-, Za Sakusesaa)"
16	Chapter Sixteen: The Old Twins II	June 8, 2016	978-4-253-21702-6
86. Quiet flames (静かなる炎, Shizukanaru honō); 87. Libra, dyed by darkness (闇に染まる天秤座(ライブラ), Yami ni somaru Libra); 88. Shapeshifting (変容, Hen'yō); 89. The decisive moment (決意のとき, Ketsui no Koku); "Extra Track: The Gate to the Tomorrow (ザ ゲート トゥ ザ トゥモロ-, Za gato tu za tumoroo)"

== Extra Edition ==
No.	Title	Japanese release date	Japanese ISBN
1	聖闘士星矢 THE LOST CANVAS 冥王神話 番外編	June 18, 2021	978-4-253-32041-2
1. Little Saint (小さな聖闘士セイント, Chiisana saint); 2. Yuzuriha's Memories (あいつとの想い出, Aitsu to no omoide); 3. Puppet and King (神気取りの罪状, Kami kidori no zaijō); 4. Friendship Under The Willow (柳の下の友情, Yanagi no shita no yūjō); 5. Yato's Effort (耶人頑張る, Yato ganbaru); 6. He Who Looks at Death (死に見入る者, Shi ni miiru mono); 7. Land of the Wind Part.1 (風の大地前編, Kaze no daichi zenpen); 8. Land of the Wind Part.2 (風の大地中篇, Kaze no daichi chūhen); 9. Land of the Wind Part.3 (風の大地後編, Kaze no daichi kōhen); 10. A Conversation Between Sisyphus and Tenma (天馬と射手の語らい, Pegasus to Sagittarius no katarai)
2	聖闘士星矢 THE LOST CANVAS 冥王神話 番外編	April 20, 2026	978-4-253-01314-7
1. The Rebirth of Vermilion Part.1 (朱の新生 前編, Shu no Shinsei Zenpen); 2. The Rebirth of Vermilion Part.2 (朱の新生 中編, Shu no Shinsei Chūhen); 3. The Rebirth of Vermilion Part.3 (朱の新生 後編, Shu no Shinsei Kōhen); 4. To Touch You (あなたに触れる, Anata ni fureru); 5. Warriors Game (戦士ゲーム, Senshi gēmu); 6. Scarlet Glitter Powder (スカーレットグリッターパウダー, Sukārettogurittāpaudā); 7. The Witch's Wish (魔女の願い, Majo no negai); 8. The Wings That Are Directed Towards The Lord (主へ向かう翼, Aruji e mukau tsubasa); 9. The Devil's Love (悪魔の恋, Akuma no koi)
