= List of Saint Seiya episodes =

The Saint Seiya anime (also known as Knights of the Zodiac), based on the manga series of the same name by Masami Kurumada, was produced by Toei Animation. It first premiered on Japan's TV Asahi on October 11, 1986, and continued on until April 1, 1989. It was directed first by Kōzō Morishita (episodes 1–73) and then by Kazuhito Kikuchi (74–114). The character designers were Shingo Araki and Michi Himeno. Seiji Yokoyama composed the soundtrack. The chief screenwriters were Takao Koyama (1–73) and Yoshiyuki Suga (74–114).

The anime is divided into arcs, similarly to Kurumada's original manga. The first is the "Sanctuary arc" (divided into four sub arcs), which starts on episode 1 and ends on episode 73, followed by the "Asgard arc" (episodes 74–99). The Asgard storyline did not exist in the manga and was created especially for the anime. The third arc, the "Poseidon arc" (episodes 100–114), concluded the anime, leaving the final part of the manga without an animated adaptation.

It was not until 2002 that the "Hades arc", the finale to Kurumada's manga, was adapted into an original video animation (OVA) series. The project was divided into three chapters – "Sanctuary", "Inferno" and "Elysion" – spanning a total of 31 episodes. The first chapter was directed by Shigeyasu Yamauchi and scripted by Michiko Yokote. It was broadcast on Animax, a Japanese pay-per-view channel, from November 9, 2002, to April 12, 2003, and later released on DVD in 2003. The second chapter was divided into two parts. The first was directed by Tomoharu Katsumata and scripted by Yosuke Kuroda. The first episodes were released from December 17, 2005, to February 18, 2006. The DVD compilation was released in the same year. The second part of the second chapter was released on Japan's SKY PerfecTV! from December 15, 2006, to March 1, 2007. The third and final chapter was, released from March 7 to August 1, 2008.

There have also been a number of theatrical releases, which do not belong to the regular chronology of the series, as they contradict its storyline on several occasions. The films are titled Evil Goddess Eris (1987), The Heated Battle of the Gods (1988), The Legend of the Crimson Youth (1988), Warriors of the Last Holy War (1989) and Heaven Chapter Overture (2004). The latest was a 3D CG animation released on June 21, 2014, titled Saint Seiya: Legend of Sanctuary.

In North America, the Saint Seiya anime was licensed to DIC Entertainment, while the home video rights were licensed to ADV Films. Two English dubs were produced. One, an edited dub produced in Toronto, Canada, by DIC, was renamed Knights of the Zodiac, and was broadcast on Cartoon Network in 2003. This dub lasted for 40 episodes on YTV and 32 on Cartoon Network and the first 28 episodes were released to VHS and DVD by ADV Kids. The other dub, produced by ADV Films in Houston, Texas, was fully uncut and lasted for 60 episodes. It retained the original Saint Seiya name. It was released to bilingual DVD from ADV Films, but production ceased when Knights of the Zodiac was canceled on Cartoon Network. In 2009, ADV's interest in Saint Seiya was renewed (combining with ADV possibly licensing the overall rights to the series as opposed to just the Home Video rights) and they re-released their uncut episodes to DVD in boxset format, with plans to release more. Production, however, was once again ceased due to ADV's financial troubles.

A DVD set from New Video, containing 11 discs and the first 73 episodes (marking episodes 61–73's debut in English), titled Saint Seiya: Sanctuary Classic Complete Collection was released in North America on April 15, 2014. The collection contains Japanese audio with English subtitles. In 2019, the first 4 seasons were released on Netflix featuring a brand new English dub from Sentai Filmworks with seasons 5 and 6 being released in 2020.

== Series overview ==
Saga (Note: In Japan, Saint Seiya is not divided into seasons, but into arcs/sagas.)	Season (Note: The "seasons" that comprise the episode list correspond to Netflix's release of the series outside Japan. In Japan, Saint Seiya was aired year-round continuously, with regular preemptions for sporting events and television specials taking place, not split into standard seasonal cycles.)	Episodes	Original run	Musical themes	
Saga	Season	Episodes	Original run	Opening	Ending
Sanctuary	1	15	October 11, 1986 − January 31, 1987	Pegasus Fantasy (Note: In Japanese ペガサス幻想(ファンタジー) (Pegasasu Fantajī)) by Make-Up	Blue Forever (Note: In Japanese 永遠ブルー (Eien Burū)) by Make-Up
Sanctuary	2	13	February 7, 1987 − May 9, 1987	Pegasus Fantasy by Make-Up	Blue Forever by Make-Up
Sanctuary	3	13	May 16, 1987 − August 8, 1987	Pegasus Fantasy by Make-Up	Blue Forever by Make-Up
Sanctuary	4	32	August 15, 1987 − April 16, 1988	Pegasus Fantasy by Make-Up	Blue Forever by Make-Up
Asgard	5	26	April 23, 1988 − November 12, 1988	Soldier Dream (Note: In Japanese 聖闘士神話(ソルジャードリーム) (Sorujā Dorīmu)) by Hironobu Kageyama	Blue Dream (Note: In Japanese 夢旅人(ブルー・ドリーム) (Burū Dorīmu)) by Hironobu Kageyama
Poseidon	6	15	November 19, 1988 − April 1, 1989	Soldier Dream by Hironobu Kageyama	Blue Dream by Hironobu Kageyama
Hades	7	13	November 9, 2002 − April 12, 2003	Chikyūgi (Note: In Japanese 地球ぎ (lit. The Earth)) by Yumi Matsuzawa	Kimi to Onaji Aozora (Note: In Japanese 君と同じ青空 (lit. The Same Blue Sky As You)) by Yumi Matsuzawa
Hades	8	12	December 17, 2005 − February 6, 2007	Pegasus Forever (Note: In Japanese 女神の戦士 (Megami no Senshi; lit. Goddess Warrior)) by Marina Del Ray	My Dear (Note: In Japanese 託す者へ (Takusu Mono e; lit. To the One I Entrust)) by Yumi Matsuzawa
Hades	9	6	March 7, 2008 − August 1, 2008	Pegasus Forever by Marina Del Ray	Del Regno (Note: In Japanese 神の園 (Kami no En; lit. The Garden of God)) by Yuuko Ishibashi

== Episodes ==
=== Season 1 (1986) ===
No.	Title (translated English / 2003 dub / original Japanese)	Rating	Original release date
1	"Revive! Legendary Hero" "A New Era of Heroic Legends" (Japanese: よみがえれ! 英雄伝説)	2.3	October 11, 1986
Legends tell of young men who wear armor known as Cloths and fight using energy known as Cosmo, in service of the goddess Athena. They are known as the Saints of Athena. In Japan, two Saints fight in a colosseum for an audience, with the host, Saori Kido, waiting for the Pegasus Saint. In Athens, Greece, a Japanese young man known as Seiya fights his rival Cassios, cuts off his ear and defeats him with his Pegasus Meteor Fist to earn the Pegasus Bronze Cloth. Later that night, before Seiya can return home, Cassios' master Shaina tries to kill him for revenge. Seiya wears the Pegasus Cloth and actually injures Shaina, but for a moment, he is unable to master the Cloth and his Cosmo. Shaina's men arrive to finish Seiya off, but thanks to his teacher Marin's advice, he turns the table and defeats her men with his Pegasus Meteor Fist technique. He also is able to break Shaina's mask to reveal her true face. The next day, Seiya heads back to Japan.
2	"Burn! Pegasus Meteor Fist!" "Burn! Pegasus Meteor Fist!" (Japanese: 燃えろ! ペガサス流星拳)	2.4	October 18, 1986
The Bronze Saints in the colosseum, Lionet Ban and Unicorn Jabu, continue their tournament match, with Jabu emerging as the victor. Seiya returns and demands to see his long-lost sister Seika after training for six years in Greece. Saori's grandfather promised him that he would see her if he retrieved the Cloth. Saori Kido, granddaughter of the late Mitsumasa Kido, leader of the Graude Foundation, and host of the Galaxian War Tournament, offers Seiya a deal: if he wins the tournament, the Foundation will find his sister. With words of encouragement from his childhood friend Miho, Seiya decides to participate in the tournament, since it is broadcast worldwide and his sister might be able to see him on television. Seiya's first opponent is Bear Geki, and because of his arms, Seiya seemed like he would die from strangulation. But thanks to his master Marin's teachings of defeating an opponent by crushing their greatest weapon, Seiya breaks Geki's arms, the source of his strength, launches hundreds of kicks and comes out victorious.
3	"Cygnus! Warrior of the Ice Fields" "Swan, Warrior of the Ice Field" (Japanese: キグナス! 氷原の戦士)	2.9	October 25, 1986
In Siberia, a young man named Hyoga is visiting his deceased mother in a sunken ship at the bottom of a frozen sea. Then, after destroying an eternal ice wall, he earns the Cygnus Bronze Cloth. Hyoga heads to Japan to participate in the tournament, with the grand prize: the Gold Cloth for the winner. After Saori gives a presentation about the significance of the tournament, Cygnus Hyoga finally arrives. Hyoga's opponent, Hydra Ichi, seems to have an advantage with his poisonous horns, coming from his fists and even knees, which keep regenerating like the Hydra's heads, but they are useless. Thanks to Hyoga's Cloth, the poison never penetrated his body. Ichi is defeated by Hyoga's Diamond Dust. Who will be Hyoga's next opponent, Pegasus Seiya or Dragon Shiryu?
4	"Dragon! The Invincible Fist and Shield" "Dragon's Invincible Fist and Shield" (Japanese: ドラゴン! 無敵の拳と盾)	3.1	November 1, 1986
The match between Pegasus Seiya and Dragon Shiryu begins. Chunli, a close friend of Shiryu's, arrives and tells him that his master, Roshi, is dying and needs to come back to the Five Ancient Peaks of Lushan. Shiryu's Rozan Rising Dragon and his diamond hard shield make him unstoppable, and it seems he is on his way to victory after knocking Seiya down several times. But Seiya isn't willing to give up and risks his life to have Shiryu destroy both his fist and shield. With his weapons destroyed, and having been witness to Seiya's determination. Shiryu removes his Cloth and is eager to finish the match. Seiya removes his Cloth as well to have a fair fight, both ready to risk their lives to fight for what they believe in and the people they love.
5	"Miraculous Revival! Cosmo of Friendship" "Miraculous Rebirth and Cosmic Friendship" (Japanese: 奇蹟の復活! 友情の小宇宙)	3.4	November 15, 1986
Seiya and Shiryu's match continues. Even though Shiryu is able to block most of Seiya's Pegasus Meteor Fist, Seiya is not only able to land a few blows, but also discovers Shiryu's weak point, the right fist of the dragon on his back, which is the spot where his heart is located. If the Rising Dragon is unleashed and Shiryu, who unconsciously lowers his left hand and exposes his weak point, is attacked in that spot, he will die. Both strike each other, with Seiya hitting the weak spot, and winning the match. However, Shiryu's heart has stopped beating. With only four minutes before he succumbs, Seiya, with encouragement from his friends and the audience, attacks Shiryu in the same spot from the back, and restarts his heart, saving him. Meanwhile, Andromeda Shun's chain senses an enemy in the colosseum.
6	"Phoenix! The Warrior who Saw Hell" "The Return of Phoenix" (Japanese: フェニックス! 地獄を見た戦士)	3.4	November 22, 1986
While in the hospital, Shiryu warns Seiya about the Phoenix Saint coming back from Hell. Back at the colosseum, Unicorn Jabu and Andromeda Shun start their match, with Shun coming out on top, thanks to multiple attacks from his Nebula Chain. However, the chain warns Shun of an enemy located where the Gold Cloth is. Suddenly, the Phoenix Saint makes his appearance before everyone in the audience, yet Shun senses a huge amount of hatred coming from the Saint. After attacking Shun, Phoenix removes the glasses on his helmet, and his true identity is revealed: He is Ikkí, Shun's older brother! Ikki, annoyed by Shun's tearful reaction, proceeds to give Shun a death blow.
7	"Stolen! The Gold Cloth" "Theft of the Gold Cloth" (Japanese: うばわれた! 黄金聖衣)	3.5	November 29, 1986
Ikki attacks Shun, much to the horror of his friends and the audience. Jabu tries to stop Ikki but is quickly defeated. Seiya then remembers how the Phoenix used to be. Ikki was once a noble and caring person as a child, especially to his younger brother Shun, and offered to take his place to train at Death Queen Island, a hell on Earth. However, due to that training, and beatings from Saori's butler Tatsumi prior to the training, Ikki's personality grew into hatred, which allowed him to survive. In the present, he quickly defeats his opponent in the tournament, Wolf Nachi, with his Phoenix illusion Fist technique. Then, Ikki's subordinates, the Black Saints, who wear Black Cloths similar to Ikki's, arrive and steal the Gold Cloth. Seiya swears to defeat him and retrieve the Cloth.
8	"Defeat them! The Black Phoenix Army" "Battle for the Gold Cloth" (Japanese: 倒せ! 暗黒フェニックス軍団)	3.7	December 6, 1986
Seiya, Shiryu, Hyoga and Shun go after Ikki and his Black Saints. Seiya tracks down Ikki's hideout and is able to stop him from wearing the Gold Cloth. The Black Saints run away with all the parts of the Cloth. However, Seiya and his friends are each able to defeat four of the Black Saints, retrieving both arms and both legs of the Cloth. Shun hears from one Black Saint that the reason for his brother's change is the training he suffered through at Death Queen Island. Seiya hears from another Black Saint that Ikki plans world domination. Unfortunately, Ikki and the rest of the Black Saints still possesses most of the Gold Cloth. Seiya swears to retrieve the rest of the Gold Cloth while Saori sends Shiryu on a quest to have the Pegasus and Dragon Cloths repaired.
9	"Formidable Enemies! The Black Four Appear" "The Black Knights Appear" (Japanese: 強敵! 暗黒四天王あらわる)	3.9	December 13, 1986
The Galaxian War Tournament is put on hold until the rest of the Gold Cloth is recovered. While Shun is walking through a forest where he trained with Ikki as a child, he is attacked by one of the four strongest Black Saints, Black Swan. Hyoga comes to his rescue and battles his counterpart. Seiya arrives to help, but Hyoga tells him it's not necessary. Just as Hyoga is about to finish the battle, the other 3 Black Saints: Black Pegasus, Black Dragon and Black Andromeda make themselves known and pick up Black Swan to go see their leader, Ikki. Meanwhile, back at her mansion, Saori receives advice from her grandfather's spirit, to be a much kinder person to her Saints and show them compassion and understanding. Ikki gives his subordinates parts of the Gold Cloth and they swear to defeat the four Bronze Saints in order to recover the rest of the Gold Cloth.
10	"Beware Shiryu! The Cemetery of Cloths" "Dragon in the Graveyard of Knights" (Japanese: 危うし紫龍! 聖衣の墓場)	4.2	December 20, 1986
Saori talks to Seiya about a challenge sent by Ikki in the Northern Alps, and shows concern for him, which surprises Seiya. Shiryu arrives at Lushan, and his master Roshi reveals that his supposed near death was a lie to test him. After being prepared by his master, Shiryu heads to Jamir to find Mu, who is said to repair the Cloths. Once he defeats the evil skeletal spirits of deceased Saints, Shiryu arrives at Jamir and finally encounters Mu and his disciple Kiki. He then learns from Mu that in order to restore the Cloths, Shiryu must give up his life. As Seiya awakens from another nightmare of Shiryu's death, the time to fight the Black Saints has arrived.
11	"Life and Death Struggle! The Terrifying Black Death Fist" "Seiya Battles Black Pegasus" (Japanese: 死闘! 恐怖の黒死拳)	4.5	December 27, 1986
The day of Ikki's challenge is here. Seiya and the others head to the Northern Alps on Mount Shishigabana. Once there, Shun gives his friends bells in order to locate each other during the battles and they split up. Kiki arrives and delivers Seiya's restored Pegasus Cloth. He also reveals what happened to Shiryu. A week ago, Shiryu gave up most of his blood to restore Seiya's Cloth. Impressed by Shiryu's friendship, Mu stops the bleeding and restores the Cloth. Seiya, now relieved his friend will return, goes off to fight Ikki. He then meets Black Pegasus, and is able to defeat him with the Pegasus Meteor Fist, retrieving the waist of the Gold Cloth, although he received some attacks from the Black Meteor Fist. But before dying, Black Pegasus warns him about the Black Death. Meanwhile, Hyoga quickly kills Black Swan with his Aurora Thunder Attack and retrieves the shoulders of the Gold Cloth. However, before his death, Black Swan sends a message to Ikki, warning him of the technique. Seiya is affected by the Black Death, with his body burning up from the inside and slowly starting to turn black, he falls off a cliff. Hyoga goes to fight Ikki.
12	"Catch! Nebula Chain of Friendship" "The Nebula Chain of Friendship" (Japanese: つかめ! 友情の星雲鎖)	4.0	January 10, 1987
Hyoga is struck by Ikki's Phoenix Demon Illusion Fist, which destroys an opponent's mind. Enraged, because of the horribly altered image of his mother, Hyoga uses the Aurora Thunder Attack, but its useless, thanks to Black Swan's message. Ikki then pierces Hyoga's chest and defeats him, stealing the parts of the Gold Cloth. Shiryu finally arrived with his Dragon Cloth restored and Kiki reminds him of Mu's warning that if he bleeds, due to his sacrifice of the Cloths' repair, the hemorrhage won't stop and he will die. Shun finds Seiya and attempts to rescue him, but Black Andromeda attacks him without mercy. Seiya sacrifices himself and falls deeper into the abyss to allow Shun to fight without worry. Saddened and enraged, Shun kills Black Andromeda and retrieves the body of the Gold Cloth. Black Dragon arrives to fight, and Shiryu arrives as well. Both dragons clash while Shun goes to rescue Seiya.
13	"Burn Up! A Single Flaming Attack" "Duel of the Dragons" (Japanese: 燃えあがれ! 炎の一撃)	4.1	January 17, 1987
While fighting, Shiryu starts to bleed and Black Dragon gains the upper hand to take him down. Shiryu ignores his master's orders to not use the Rising Dragon when exhausted, otherwise he will die. But he decides to use it anyway, to fight for friendship. However, it is ineffective. Before Shiryu succumbs however, Black Dragon saves his life by touching the pressure point and stopping the bleeding. Black Dragon bleeds to death instead of Shiryu, sacrificing himself, believing in friendship for the first time. Shiryu saves Seiya from the black blood in his body, striking his star points, allowing it to flow out. Then, he heads off with Shun and most of the Gold Cloth to find Ikki. Once he finds Ikki, Shun tries to offer his life in order to change his brother's ways, but Seiya arrives just in time and begins the final battle.
14	"Defeated! The Phantom Fist" "Defeat of the Phantom Demon" (Japanese: 敗れたり! 幻魔拳)	4.5	January 24, 1987
Hyoga arrives and is revealed to have survived Ikki's attack. Ikki attacks Hyoga with his illusion, but it backfires and Hyoga reflects it back to him. With his illusion now useless, Ikki resorts to using his Rising Phoenix technique to defeat the four Bronze Saints. However, the Gold Cloth assembled, and protected Seiya. Both Saints begin to battle. Even though Seiya destroys the Phoenix Bronze Cloth, Ikki has the upper hand, since his Cloth possess the ability to revive itself from its ashes. Ikki is about to finish off Seiya. However, Shiryu's shield and Shun's chains go to help Seiya, then he defeats Ikki with a Pegasus Meteor Fist combined with Hyoga's Diamond Dust. Thanks to their friendship, the Bronze Saints are victorious. As Shiryu, Shun and Hyoga wake up, Seiya asks Ikki why he has changed so much.
15	"Revealed Now! The Enigma of Ikki" "Phoenix's Secret Revealed" (Japanese: 今あかす! 一輝の謎)	4.7	January 31, 1987
Ikki reveals his grueling training on Death Queen Island. His master taught him to use hatred in order to win, but Ikki fell in love with his master's daughter, Esmeralda. However, One day, Esmeralda was accidentally killed by her father while Ikki fought him. Enraged by the lack of interest of his daughter's death, Ikki killed his master. Since that day, Ikki became the Phoenix Saint, the leader of the Black Saints and a creature of hatred. Back in the present, Seiya and the others try to make Ikki their comrade, but Docrates and his men arrive from the Sanctuary in Greece and steal most of the Gold Cloth. Ikki gives Seiya the Golden Helmet and sacrifices himself by creating a huge avalanche with his Rising Phoenix to kill Docrates. Seiya and his friends swear to protect the helmet, retrieve the rest of the Gold Cloth and avenge Ikki's death.

=== Season 2 (1987) ===
No.	Title (translated English / 2003 dub / original Japanese)	Rating	Original release date
16	"A Giant! The Fierce Attack of Docrates" "Docrates' Fierce Attack" (Japanese: 巨大! ドクラテスの猛襲)	4.9	February 7, 1987
Chaos reigns around the world, and especially in the Sanctuary in Greece, due to the sudden death of the Pope. His brother Arles has taken over, ruling with an iron fist, and orders his men to retrieve the Gold Cloth. The Sanctuary's new leadership encourages Saints to fight against each other as Shaina and Marin have a deadly sparring match. Back in Japan, Seiya and his friends are downhearted after their battle, but still have the helmet of the Gold Cloth. Unfortunately, Docrates has survived and attacks the Kido mansion to retrieve the helmet. Even though Seiya and his friends hold him off, Docrates kidnaps Saori and demands he bring the helmet to the colosseum.
17	"Rescue! Saori's Crisis" "Save Sienna!" (Japanese: 救え! 沙織の危機)	4.6	February 14, 1987
Docrates escapes with Saori and Tatsumi as his hostages. Hyoga comes up with a plan. Seiya and Shun take the helmet to the colosseum, while Shiryu and Kiki go back to Mount Shishigabana to find the rest of the Gold Cloth. Docrates reveals himself to be Cassios' older brother and wants revenge for what Seiya did to his brother. Docrates' men run off with the helmet, but Hyoga defeats them and retrieves the helmet. He then returns to the colisseum to help his friends. He uses a technique, taught to him by his master, which freezes Docrates' enormous legs, immobilizing him. Seiya and Shun then team up to kill Docrates, thus saving Saori and Tatsumi. Unfortunately, Shiryu and Kiki are too late as a helicopter flies off with the rest of the Gold Cloth.
18	"Rampage! The Ghost Saints of the Caribbean" "Great Knights on the Rampage" (Japanese: 大暴れ! カリブの幽霊聖闘士)	4.5	February 21, 1987
Pope Arles' henchman Gigas, has Shaina contact her friend Gheist and her Ghost Saints, Sea Serpent, Dolphin, and Jellyfish, whom were exiled by the previous Pope due to their violent nature. They hijack one of Saori's oil tankers in the Caribbean and demand the four Bronze Saints bring the helmet of the Gold Cloth, or the tanker will be destroyed and the crew killed. Once on the ship, Seiya distracts two of the Saints while Shun stops Jellyfish from destroying the ship with his Nebula Chain. Seiya, Shiryu and Hyoga gain the upper hand and almost defeat the villains. However, Gheist casts an illusion to trick the Bronze Saints, and the Ghost Saints manage to steal the helmet.
19	"Life or Death! Bloody Battle at the Island of Hell" "Battle on the Island of Spirits" (Japanese: 生か死か! 魔界島の血戦)	4.3	February 28, 1987
Saori gives the downhearted Saints confidence to continue their mission, and reveals the location of Gheist's hideout: the Island of Spirits. Once there, Seiya defeats Sea Serpent with Hyoga's help, but Hyoga rests to recover his energy. Shiryu defeats Dolphin, but is electrocuted by Jellyfish and has to rest. Shun meets the same fate, but Seiya kills Jellyfish. Seiya arrives at Gheist's castle and fights her. However, Gheist's Thunder Claw technique, the same technique as Shaina's, surprises him, but thanks to the Gold Cloth helmet, Seiya defeats Gheist and reunites with his friends, helmet in hand.
20	"Fighting Seriously! Shaina's Revenge" "Shina's Revenge" (Japanese: 本気で戦え! シャイナの逆襲)	4.6	March 7, 1987
When the colosseum in Japan is set on fire, the Saints decide to go into hiding to protect the helmet. Shun goes with Saori and the helmet to her mountain villa. Seiya, Shiryu, and Hyoga go to talk with their respective masters to gain information about the Sanctuary. Marin, Seiya's master, overhears that Hyoga's master, Crystal, is under Pope Arles' control. Seiya arrives in Greece to see Marin, but is attacked by a vengeful Shaina, wearing her Ophiucius Cloth. Seiya is about to lose the battle, but Marin intervenes and warns Seiya that Hyoga is in danger. Seiya leaves to help his friend. Hyoga arrives in Siberia, and notices that the village is abandoned. Hyoga then finds his young friend Jakov, who tells him the villagers are being forced to build an ice pyramid, and that Crystal has completely changed. Hyoga confronts his master, but Crystal attacks him.
21	"Cold-hearted! The Aurora Confrontation" "Fight on the Ice Field" (Japanese: 非情! オーロラの対決)	4.5	March 14, 1987
Hyoga cannot bring himself to fight his master, who taught him how to be a Saint. He leaves to rescue the villagers. Seiya arrives in Siberia to lend a hand, and has Jakov lead him to the ice pyramid. Hyoga defeats the gunmen who forced the villagers to work and frees them. Crystal then appears to fight his disciple. Hyoga is about to be killed, but is saved by Seiya. After recuperating, Hyoga unleashes a deadly Diamond Dust and defeats his master. However, Crystal gets up, and destroys the ice pyramid, having returned to normal. Unfortunately, he succumbs to his wounds, dying in Hyoga's arms.
22	"Flaming Rebirth! Ikki the Immortal" "Phoenix the Firebird" (Japanese: 炎の復活! 不死身の一輝)	4.3	March 21, 1987
Gigas and his disciple, the Flame Saint, arrive in Japan, and plots to steal the Gold Cloth helmet since the Bronze Saints are gone. They set fire to the Kido mansion to lure out the Saints. Tatsumi takes the bait and is forced to reveal the location of the helmet. Shun dons his Cloth and challenges the Flame Saint, however, he is no match for him. Just as the battle seems to be lost, Phoenix Ikki appears from the flames, alive and well, now fighting on the side of justice. Ikki easily kills the Flame Saint, while Gigas runs away. Shun and Saori are overjoyed to have Ikki back alive, and Seiya and Hyoga arrive just in time to reunite with their dear friend and now comrade.
23	"Silver Saint! The Proud Assassin" "Attack of the Silver Knight" (Japanese: シルバー聖闘士! 誇り高き刺客)	4.7	March 28, 1987
At the Sanctuary, Phaeton, the new Chief of Staff, sends Marin and a Silver Saint to Japan in order to kill Seiya. While celebrating Ikki's return and discussing Arles' plans, Saori has Seiya and his friends relax for a few days. While out with his childhood friend Miho on a beach, Seiya encounters Marin, revealed to be the Eagle Silver Saint, and Lizard Misty. Seiya has Miho warn Saori and fights Misty, with Kiki bringing the Pegasus Cloth to him. However, Seiya is no match for him. Suddenly, Marin attacks Seiya, piercing his heart. As Marin leaves, Misty pulls Seiya from his makeshift grave and revealed Marin used a blank fist. She didn't actually kill Seiya. The Silver Saint says Marin will be executed for her betrayal and begins counting to Seiya's demise.
24	"Fly Pegasus! Like a Comet" "Fly, Pegasus, Fly" (Japanese: 飛べペガサス! すい星のように)	4.9	April 11, 1987
A brief recap of what has happened since the first episode is shown. Misty knocks Seiya into the ocean, but he gets up again. Seiya wasn't able to land a blow due to Misty's forcefield blocking it. After struggling for a while, he attacks again. Even though they seem useless, a blow landed, hurting Misty for the first time. Seiya then uses two new techniques to defeat Misty once and for all: the Pegasus Comet Fist and Pegasus Rolling Crash. Later that day, Marin meets with two more Silver Saints, Whale Moses and Hound Asterion. They discover Misty's corpse and figure out that Marin betrayed them. Moses is able to defeat her thanks to Asterion's mind reading ability. Using Marin as bait, Moses and Asterion lure Seiya to them, discussing that Marin was searching for her younger brother and believe Seiya is her brother. Kiki warns Seiya that Marin is in danger. He arrives at the beach and fights Moses, but is about to be defeated. Moses then reveals Marin is Seiya's long-lost sister. Rejuvenated after hearing the shocking news, Seiya swiftly kills Moses and goes to rescue Marin, but Asterion stands in his way. Meanwhile, Hyoga, who was sent by Saori, is on his way to the beach to help Seiya.
25	"Fight! Under Athena's Guidance" "Fight On! The Rise of Athena" (Japanese: 戦え! アテナのもとで)	5.0	April 18, 1987
Seiya can't land a hit on Asterion because of his mind reading. Seiya is then defeated, but Marin arrives, thanks to Kiki rescuing her from the ocean. Marin has her mind in a complete blank in order to kill Asterion. When Seiya wakes up, Hyoga and Kiki are there with him, and he finds a message written by Marin: 'Seiya, guard Athena'. The five Bronze Saints meet with Saori at the Colosseum, and Tatsumi reveals the truth told to him by Mitsumasa Kido. Thirteen years ago, Mitsumasa Kido, who was on a trip to Greece, found a dying Saint named Aiolos. With him was the Gold Cloth and a baby girl. Aiolos pleaded to Mitsumasa to protect the Cloth and the baby, revealing her to be a reincarnation of the Goddess Athena, and to give the Gold Cloth to someone worthy of possessing it. Saori is shocked but accepts the truth, revealing a powerful, gentle Cosmos to her Saints, who also accept Saori as Athena. Just then, another Silver Saint, Centaurus Babel, appears to kill the Bronze Saints. However, three mysterious Saints appear from the sky.
26	"Friend or Foe! Steel Saints" "Friends or Foes" (Japanese: 敵か味方か! スチールセイント)	5.1	April 25, 1987
The three mystery warriors, known as the Steel Saints, Sky Cloth Sho, Land Cloth Daichi, and Marine Cloth Ushio, appear and assist the Bronze Saints. However, they don't know which side the mystery Saints are on, and the warriors disappear. Hyoga is able to kill Babel, letting him know that the goddess Athena is on their side. At the Sanctuary, Shaina, revealed to be a Silver Saint like Marin, enlists the help of two Silver Saints, Spartan, who has telekinetic abilities, and Perseus Argol, who can turn people to stone with his Medusa Shield. Meanwhile, Seiya, Shiryu and Shun head to Greece by plane on a reconnaissance mission. However, Spartan brings the plane down to an island in the Mediterranean.
27	"Seiya Turns to Stone! The Shield of Medusa" "Medusa's Shield" (Japanese: 星矢が石に! メドゥサの盾)	5.0	May 2, 1987
Shaina fights Seiya while Shun and Shiryu fight Argol and Spartan, respectively. Seiya is able to defeat her with his new techniques, but Shun is turned into stone by Argol. Seiya is also turned to stone, but Shiryu was spared, thanks to his Dragon Shield. Spartan attempts to restrain Shiryu for Argol to turn him into stone, but Shiryu gets out of the way and Spartan is turned into stone as well, so now Shiryu is able to fight one on one with Argol. Seiya and Shun can't be turned back to normal until Argol dies. Argol attacks Shiryu again and again to try to get him to stop hiding from the shield.
28	"Dragon! The Sacrificial Blow" "Dragon's Sacrifice" (Japanese: ドラゴン! 捨て身の一撃)	5.3	May 9, 1987
Shiryu's Rising Dragon is useless against Argol and can't risk looking at the Medusa Shield. Unfortunately, his Dragon Shield is turned to stone during the battle. But as soon as he is about to lose, he is saved by the Steel Saints. However, Argol quickly defeats them. Shiryu realizes there is one way to fight him: he blinds himself. With his senses heightened, Shiryu is able to destroy the shield and kill Argol, thus restoring Seiya and Shun. The Steel Saints leave and Spartan is forced to run away, with Shaina in tow. A plane, called in by the Steel Saints, arrives to take the Saints home. While Shiryu is in the hospital, Seiya, Saori and the others learn of the Steel Saints' origin. Dr. Asamori, a scientist hired by Mitsumasa Kido, built the mechanical Steel Cloths in order for them to assist the Bronze Saints. Back at the hospital, Shiryu survived, but his friends receive terrible news: Shiryu will never be able to see again.

=== Season 3 (1987) ===
No.	Title (translated English / 2003 dub / original Japanese)	Rating	Original release date
29	"Kidnapped! The Crow Army Attacks Saori" "Attack of the Crow Army" (Japanese: 誘拐! 沙織を襲うカラス軍団)	5.5	May 16, 1987
Chunli takes Shiryu back to Lushan to recover. Back at the Sanctuary, Shaina decides to go to Japan to kill Seiya once and for all, since he had seen her face during their first battle, which is forbidden for female Saints. Seiya is angered with Shiryu unable to be in their group, and Ikki decides he's had enough of his childish behavior and leaves, wanting to do things on his own. However, Ikki's departure is meant to confuse the Sanctuary, and is confident Shiryu will return. Suddenly, Saori is kidnapped by a flock of crows, controlled by a Silver Saint, Crow Jamian. Seiya runs after her, and is almost defeated by Jamian, but gets back up, and goes to rescue Saori.
30	"Burn! Cosmo of Love" "Athena's Aura of Love" (Japanese: 燃えあがれ! 愛のコスモ)	5.7	May 23, 1987
Seiya is able to rescue Saori, but breaks his right arm in the process. Cornered by Shaina and Jamian, Seiya jumps with Saori from a cliff. The next day, Shaina finds Saori that almost kiss an unconscious Seiya while protecting her. As Jamian arrives to take Saori to the Sanctuary, Saori reveals her Athenian Cosmos and has Jamian's crows attack him. Hyoga and Shun arrives in time to help them, with Shun killing Jamian. Hyoga is able to defeat Shaina, but as soon as they are about to leave to give Seiya medical attention, two more Silver Saints arrive.
31	"Devil Illusion! Deadline of Life or Death" "Evil Apparitions" (Japanese: 幻魔! 生死のデッドライン)	5.9	May 30, 1987
The Silver Saints, Auriga Capella and Cerberus Dante, arrive to take Saori to the Sanctuary. Unfortunately, Hyoga and Shun are thrown off the cliff by Dante and his Steel Ball and Chain. Ikki suddenly arrives to fight both Silver Saints. Ikki kills Capella by hitting him with his Phoenix Devil Illusion and then watches the Silver Saint being sliced with his own saucers. Dante, exhausted from fighting Ikki, gets back up, but Shun comes back alongside Hyoga. As Ikki leaves, Shun kills Dante.
32	"Great Explosion! Death Queen Island" "Island of Doom Explodes" (Japanese: 大爆発! デスクィーン島)	5.8	June 6, 1987
Ikki receives a challenge from the new leader of Death Queen Island, Django. Seiya recovers from his injuries, and goes with his friends to help Ikki. While thinking of Esmeralda, his deceased lover, Ikki realizes why he fights and swears to rid the world of the Black Saints. Django, three Black Saints and the Black Phoenix arrive to kill Ikki. Just as he is about to be defeated, Esmeralda speaks to Ikki from the Great Beyond and tells him to keep on living. Seiya and the others arrive and kill the three Black Saints. Ikki kills Django and the Black Phoenix. However, the whole challenge was a trap set up by Arles. He causes the volcano on the island to explode, and Death Queen Island sinks into the sea. But Saori is able to rescue her Saints from the disaster.
33	"Dragon and Tiger Clash! The Tears of the Light-Deprived Dragon" "Sightless Dragon's Tears" (Japanese: 龍虎激突! 光なきドラゴンの涙)	5.6	June 13, 1987
Shiryu is still recovering, with Chunli by his side taking care of him. Unfortunately, his master cannot cure his eyes. Ikki departs from the group again, while Seiya decides he's had enough and decides to find Mu, in order to have him cure Shiryu's eyes. Ohko, an old rival of Shiryu's who also trained to earn the Dragon Cloth, arrives to challenge him. Ohko was expelled by their master because of his violent nature, so he traveled around the world, defeating countless opponents and swore revenge on both Shiryu and his master. In the middle of their fight, Chunli reveals Shiryu is blind. Ohko leaves, disappointed Shiryu isn't as strong as he remembers. Shiryu, however, is enraged because he feels he isn't strong enough to protect Chunli or rejoin his friends. Seiya is close to reaching Jamir, hoping that Shiryu does not give up.
34	"Farewell Friend! Rest in Peace" "Farewell, Comrade" (Japanese: さらば友よ! やすらかに眠れ)	5.8	June 20, 1987
Shiryu's master reminds Shiryu to focus on the reason why he fights. That reason will give him true strength. Shiryu meets Ohko to settle their score, however, Okho blindfolds his eyes to make it an even fight. Ohko quickly gains the upper hand, but as Shiryu thinks of his friends, the reason he fights, he is able to defeat Ohko using the Rising Dragon. As Ohko dies in his arms, Shiryu promises to continue fighting wearing the Dragon Cloth in his honor. Meanwhile, the Gold Cloth parts from both the Kido mansion and the Sanctuary come together and reunite. The completed Sagittarius Cloth sinks into a lake.
35	"Desperate Journey! Dragon, Open Your Eyes!" "Seiya's Journey of Hope" (Japanese: 決死行! 開けドラゴンの目よ)	5.9	June 27, 1987
Both Saori and Arles are desperate to find the Cloth. Saori has sent Sho to find Seiya and inform him of the news. Seiya arrives in Jamir, but Mu is nowhere to be found. However, Kiki tells Seiya of the Water of Life, found on Mt. Jandara. The water is said to cure any sickness, but reaching the spring is difficult. Seiya goes to the mountain and goes through many challenges, reminding himself he is doing this for Shiryu. He finally finds the spring of the Water of Life. Meanwhile, Kiki is attacked by the Silver Saint Tarantula Arachne, sent by the Sanctuary to find Mu and have him locate the Gold Cloth. Seiya arrives and begins to fight, but Arachne absorbs his Cosmos using his Tarantula Web. Sho arrives in time to help Seiya. Seiya dons his Cloth and kills Arachne with his Meteor of Pegasus. As Sho informs him of what has happened, Seiya instructs Kiki to take the Water of Life to Shiryu and leaves with Sho to go back to Japan.
36	"Surprise! The Twelve Gold Cloths" "Twelve Gold Cloths" (Japanese: 驚き! 12体のゴールドクロス)	5.7	July 4, 1987
As soon as Seiya returns and is informed of the situation, he comes down with a fever due to exhaustion and is admitted to a hospital. Pope Arles, growing desperate to find the Gold Cloth summons one of his strongest Saints, the Gold Saint Scorpio Milo, and informs him of the defeat of the Silver Saints at the hands of the Bronze Saints. Arles reveals the Sagittarius Gold Cloth is not the only one, since there are 12 in existence. He also reveals that Aiolos, the Sagittarius Gold Saint, escaped from the Sanctuary with a baby girl and betrayed them. Finally, nine Gold Saints are loyal to Athena, but two Gold Saints are "betraying" them; the Aries and Libra Saints. Aiolia, Aiolos' younger brother and the Leo Gold Saint, is sent to retrieve the Gold Cloth. Meanwhile, Shaina confronts Seiya, revealing that he had seen her true self during his childhood, and is determined to kill him.
37	"The Mask Cries Out! Love or Death?" "Decision of the Mask" (Japanese: 仮面が叫ぶ! 愛か死か)	5.9	July 11, 1987
Seiya refuses to fight Shaina. Suddenly, Aiolia appears and demands the Sagittarius Gold Cloth, but realizes that it's not in the Bronze Saints' possession. Aiolia reveals that his brother Aiolos betrayed the Sanctuary and was branded a traitor, so he swore to become a Gold Saint in order to clear his name. Seiya attacks, but Aiolia dodges the attack without difficulty. He explains that all Gold Saints move at the speed of light, while Bronze Saints move at the speed of sound. Aiolia strikes, but Shaina takes the blow, protecting Seiya. She then reveals that female Saints must make a choice if their face is seen by a man: kill him or love him, and Shaina has fallen in love with him. Angered, Seiya strikes, but Aiolia agrees to spare him for now, in order to save Shaina's life. Suddenly, three Silver Saints appear, sent by the Pope to watch over Aiolia. Canis Major Sirius, Musca Dio, and Hercules Algheti attack Seiya, but then, the Sagittarius Gold Cloth, with a new form, appears and covers Seiya. He then kills the three Silver Saints at the same time.
38	"Clash! Gold Saint" "Battle of the Gold Knights" (Japanese: 激突! ゴールドセイント)	6.2	July 18, 1987
Aiolia attacks Sagittarius Seiya, but now that he wears the Gold Cloth, he is now able to keep up. However, Aiolia gains the upper hand, and knocks out Hyoga and Shun, who have come to help Seiya. Saori suddenly appears and reveals to Aiolia that she is in fact Athena. Also that thirteen years ago, Arles tried to kill her while she was still a baby. Aiolos stopped him and escaped with her and the Gold Cloth. Arles then lied to everyone and branded him a traitor. Unconvinced, Aiolia attacks her to see if she speaks the truth, but Seiya stops the blow. Aiolos' spirit appears and attacks his brother. Aiolia realizes the truth, his brother was a hero and a true Saint, and pledges allegiance to Saori, the true Athena. The Sagittarius Cloth comes off Seiya's body and stands by Saori. Aiolia takes Shaina back to the Sanctuary to recover and entrusts Seiya to protect Saori and the Gold Cloth. The battle against the Sanctuary is fast approaching.
39	"Speed of Light! The Strong Fist Faster than the Speed of Sound" "Dragon Defends His Master" (Japanese: 光速! マッハを越える強拳)	6.5	July 25, 1987
Shiryu is given the Water of Life, but it is ineffective, however, his ancient master Roshi assures him that he will be able to see again one day. He also tells him of the existence of the Gold Saints. Suddenly, out of the waterfall, the Gold Saint Cancer Deathmask appears, with orders to kill the master, who is revealed to be the Libra Gold Saint. Shiryu fights Deathmask, but is quickly outmatched, and falls to the bottom of the lake. Deathmask knows of the true nature of the Pope, but still serves him, believing evil can become justice. Shiryu reemerges with his Cloth and pushes the Gold Saint back. When Deathmask is about to unleash his technique, Sekishiki, Mu appears, revealing himself to be the Aries Gold Saint. Deathmask, being outmatched, decides to retreat. Shiryu challenges Deathmask as their fight isn't over, and Deathmask invites him to confront him at the House of Cancer if he dares. He then prepares himself to return to his friends. Meanwhile, Seiya, Hyoga and Shun eagerly await their friend's return.
40	"Let's Go! Our Departure" "Away We Go!" (Japanese: 行くぞ! 俺たちの旅立ち)	6.8	August 1, 1987
The day before the battle against the Sanctuary, Seiya and his friends spend time in the orphanage where they grew up to play with the children and remember good times. Miho is sad that Seiya is leaving to fight, but he tells her it's his destiny, and won't die until he sees his sister. The next day, Shun is confronted by Chameleon June, one of his friends from Andromeda Island, where he trained. She tells him that Scorpio Milo, on orders from the Sanctuary, destroyed the island and killed their friends and master, Cepheus Albiore. Leda and Spica, students of Albiore, arrive to take Shun's life in order to appease the Sanctuary, just like his destiny of the constellation of Andromeda.
41	"Great Battle at the Sanctuary! Athena's Greatest Crisis" "Battle at the Sanctuary" (Japanese: 聖域大決戦! アテナ最大の危機)	7.1	August 8, 1987
Shun remembers his brother Ikki's words of surpassing one's destiny and kills Leda and Spica, rescuing June. He finally arrives at the airport where Seiya, Saori and his friends are waiting for him. They all head towards the Sanctuary, and on the way, they talk about the Gold Saints, whose number equals the signs of the Zodiac, and the possibility that Pope Arles not only has two personalities, good and evil, but also that he may be one of the twelve Gold Saints. At the Sanctuary, Leo Aiolia confronts Arles about Athena and his brother Aiolos. Arles tries to kill Aiolia, now that he knows the truth, with the abilities of a Gold Saint. Just then, another Gold Saint, Virgo Shaka, arrives and fights Aiolia, but both of their techniques are even and clash into the mythic One Thousand Wars, where two Gold Saints are evenly matched. Seiya and the others arrive, with a guide waiting for them. Shortly after, they rendezvous with Shiryu who awaited their arrival. The guide leads them to the 12 Houses of the Zodiac, and tells them they must get through all 12 Houses to get to the Pope's chambers. But each House is guarded by a Gold Saint. The guide reveals himself to be the Silver Saint, Sagitta Ptolemy, and attacks with his Phantom Arrow. Most of them are illusions and Ptolemy is defeated by Seiya. However, one of the arrows was real and strikes Saori in the heart, much to the Bronze Saints' horror.

=== Season 4 (1987–88) ===
No.	Title	Rating	Original release date
42	"The Ultimate Cosmo! Seven Senses"; Transliteration: "Kyūkyoku no Kosumo! Sebun Senshizu" (Japanese: 究極のコスモ! セブンセンシズ)	7.4	August 15, 1987
Ptolemy, just before dying, points out that Saori has 12 hours to live, and the Bronze Saints must bring the Pope to her because he is the only one who can remove the arrow from her chest. Even though they don't want to leave her alone, Saori urges the Saints to continue without her. The first House, Aries, is guarded by Mu. The Saints are surprised, but as Shiryu attacks, Mu and Kiki point out that their Bronze Cloths have sustained major damage due to all of their battles. Mu offers to repair their Cloths. As the Saints wait, Shun spots a clock tower with flames instead of numbers, and the twelve flames indicate the time that Saori has to live. One of the flames unfortunately disappears because Mu's repairs took one hour. Once finished, Mu explains to the hurried Saints that the Gold Saints have mastered the essence of Cosmos, known as the Seventh Sense, a mystic power beyond the Six Senses. If the Bronze Saints reach the Seventh Sense, they have the possibility to defeat the Gold Saints. While Mu and Kiki look after Saori, the four Bronze Saints head to the House of Taurus and encounter its guardian, Taurus Aldebaran.
43	"Big Bang! Battle at the Golden Bull Temple"; Transliteration: "Biggu Ban! Kingyūkyū no sentō" (Japanese: ビッグバン! 金牛宮の戦闘)	7.8	August 22, 1987
Seiya tries to distract Aldebaran with his Pegasus Meteor Fist, allowing his friends to go the next House. Unfortunately, the Taurus Saint knocks out Shiryu, Hyoga and Shun, leaving Seiya to fight alone. Seiya's abilities seem to be no match for Aldebaran's Great Horn technique, so he is pushed into a grave by the Gold Saint. Seiya begins to lose hope, but Saori appears before him using her Cosmos, urging him not to give up. Marin also appears before him, reminding him of their training with the combat principle iai. Aldebaran's posture resembles that style of fighting, so now, with new determination, Seiya comes back to the battle. As Aldebaran attacks him again, Seiya is able to see through the light speed attack, make a huge counterattack and break his posture. Aldebaran realizes that Seiya is beginning to awaken his Seventh Sense. While fighting, they make a deal, if Seiya is able to break one of Aldebaran's Golden Horns, he will be named the victor.
44	"Gemini! The Maze of Light and Darkness"; Transliteration: "Sōjikyū! Hikari to yami no meikyū" (Japanese: 双児宮! 光と闇の迷宮)	8.1	August 29, 1987
The battle between Seiya and Aldebaran rages on. Seiya is now able to see through the Great Horn, block it and send it back. He then surprises Aldebaran and breaks one of the horns. Seiya is named the victor as promised and is allowed passage to the next House. Shiryu and the others awaken but Aldebaran does not allow them to leave until they defeat him. Seiya reluctantly leaves and warns them of Aldebaran's use of the iai principle. He then heads to the House of Gemini as the second hour ends. Shiryu, Hyoga and Shun combine their abilities, freezing Aldebaran's arms in the process. They are also allowed passage, but not before Aldebaran instructs them to awaken their Seventh Senses individually and not to underestimate the Gold Saints. The Bronze Saints meet up with Seiya but soon realize they cannot go through the House of Gemini and end up back at the entrance. Meanwhile, Aldebaran reveals to Mu that the Bronze Saints weren't the traitors that Pope Arles said they were. They also begin to doubt about the Pope's intentions. Back at the House of Gemini, the four Bronze Saints now face two Houses of Gemini, so they decide to split up. Seiya and Shiryu head to the right House and Hyoga and Shun head to the left House, with the group that goes through the exit to head for the House of Cancer. Hyoga and Shun try to find the exit, but they encounter the Gemini Gold Saint instead.
45	"Horror! Adrift in Another Dimension"; Transliteration: "Kyōfu! Ijigen e no hyōryū" (Japanese: 恐怖! 異次元への漂流)	8.4	September 5, 1987
Shun and Hyoga face the Gemini Gold Saint, but they can't sense a presence in front of them. Hyoga attacks with his Diamond Dust and Aurora Thunder Attack, but both techniques come back to them. At the other House of Gemini, Seiya and Shiryu encounter the Gemini Gold Saint as well, but since Shiryu is blind, he is immune to the illusions and can see the exit in his mind. He stops Seiya from attacking, and both rush to the exit. They try to figure out what caused the illusions, but then they head to the House of Cancer, confident that Shun and Hyoga will figure out how to get through. Meanwhile, Pope Arles is in meditation, and is revealed to be the one who created the illusions. Shun's chains are confused and can't attack the Gold Saint. The Gemini Gold Saint uses his Another Dimension technique and Hyoga is sent away to another realm. Shun was able to save himself thanks to his chains, but he couldn't save Hyoga. The Gold Saint unleashes the technique again, but this time, he breaks one of Shun's chains and is about to break the other one.
46	"Cry Out! The Nebula Chain that Combines Attack and Defense"; Transliteration: "Hoero! Kobo ittai no Nebyura Chēn" (Japanese: 吠えろ! 攻防一体の星雲鎖)	8.8	September 12, 1987
The Gemini Gold Saint breaks the other chain, but a strong Cosmos disrupts Arles' meditation, bringing Shun back to the House of Gemini, with the exit now visible. Arles tries to figure out who broke his meditation. The source came from inside the volcano in Canon Island, where Saints go to restore their power. While restoring his power, Phoenix Ikki sent his Cosmos to save Shun, promising he will join his friends and brother in battle. Shun refuses to leave without Hyoga, but since Ikki has gone back to sleep, the illusions come back and the exit is closed again. The Gold Saint reappears and unleashes his Another Dimension again, with Shun now at his mercy. After remembering the words of Saori, Ikki and Aldebaran, Shun recovers and awakens his Seventh Sense in order to fight for his friends and Athena. Both chains come back to him and masters two new techniques: Rolling Defense and Thunder Wave. Shun uses the Thunder Wave to attack the one who created the illusions. After strangely talking to himself, Arles reluctantly allows Shun passage through the House. With the illusions now gone, Shun finds the Gemini Gold Cloth empty. He leaves the House and hopes Hyoga is okay. Meanwhile, in another House, Hyoga awakens to find another Gold Saint standing before him.
47	"Farewell Hyoga! Sleep, O Brave One!"; Transliteration: "Saraba Hyōga! Yūsha yo nemure" (Japanese: さらば氷河! 勇者よ眠れ)	9.1	September 19, 1987
Hyoga encounters the Gold Saint Aquarius Camus, who was the master of Hyoga's late master, Crystal. Camus reveals that they are in the House of Libra, supposedly guarded by Shiryu's master, Roshi. Camus gives Hyoga the choice to surrender or fight him and attacks him. Hyoga tells Camus of his disciple's death and Arles' control over him. Camus ignores his words and shoots a beam to Siberia in order to sink the ship where Hyoga's mother is, to the bottom. Angered that he will never see his mother again, Hyoga attacks, but due to his weak Cosmos, and him being filled with emotions, his attacks are useless. Camus tells Hyoga that to reach the Ultimate Cosmos, the Seventh Sense, he must forget about his mother. However, Hyoga is unable to, so Camus defeats Hyoga with his ultimate attack, Aurora Execution. As the third flame on the clock is extinguished, Hyoga's Cosmos disappears. Camus, as a final respect to his disciple, places Hyoga in a Freezing Coffin, which will never melt. Camus bids farewell to his granddisciple and leaves the House of Libra.
48	"Dragon! Revive from the Land of the Dead"; Transliteration: "Doragon! Yomigaere shi no kuni kara" (Japanese: ドラゴン! 甦れ死の国から)	9.4	September 26, 1987
Another recap is shown, about the battles against the Black Saints and Silver Saints. In the present, Seiya and Shiryu arrive at the House of Cancer. Inside, they are horrified to discover the House is filled with the faces of dead people, including the faces of children. Cancer Deathmask appears and reveals that the faces are of all the people he has killed while "fighting evil". Enraged, Shiryu tells Seiya to go to the House of Leo while he fights Deathmask by himself. Deathmask unleashes his Sekishiki Waves and transports Shiryu's soul to the Yomotsu Hirasaka, a place between the Worlds of the Living and the Dead. Once there, Shiryu is able to see and notices strange figures walking, and sees Hyoga alongside them. Saori appears and tells him that those figures are headed to the Land of the Dead. She helps Shiryu return to the House of Cancer to defeat Deathmask. Shiryu's Rising Dragon is inaffective against Deathmask, since he has seen the technique before in their previous fight. Shiryu is once again sent to the Yomotsu Hirasaka. Meanwhile, at the Five Ancient Peaks of Lushan, Chunli begins to pray for Shiryu.
49	"Love! Chunli's Prayers"; Transliteration: "Ai! Chunli no inori" (Japanese: 愛! 春麗の祈り)	9.7	October 10, 1987
While in the Yomotsu Hirasaka, Shiryu is able to see again, and he feels Chunli's prayers. He then remembers his childhood training days, and the reason why he became the Dragon Bronze Saint: Chunli. However, Deathmask also senses the prayers and goes to the Yomotsu Hirasaka to finish off Shiryu once and for all. He then shows Shiryu the dead figures' destination, the Yomotsu Hirasaka's hole, a portal that leads to the World of the Dead. Once someone falls in there, they can never come back. Deathmask is about to throw Shiryu into Yomotsu, but Chunli's prayers distract him. Deathmask then finds out where the prayers came from. Annoyed by her prayers, he uses his Cosmos to throw Chunli down the waterfalls. Now filled with intense rage, Shiryu attacks Deathmask without mercy, swearing to kill him, also to avenge not only the people he's killed, but also Chunli, the most important person to him.
50	"Arise Dragon! Shiryu's Angry Cosmo"; Transliteration: "Nobore ryū! Shiryū okori no Kosumo" (Japanese: 昇れ龍! 紫龍怒りのコスモ)	10.1	October 17, 1987
Shiryu's furious assault continues, but Deathmask once again gains the upper hand, taking advantage of the protection his Gold Cloth gives him. As Shiryu is about to fall into Yomotsu, zombies, who were Deathmask's victims, attack the Gold Saint. However, they are powerless against their murderer and are thrown down into the World of the Dead. While Shiryu wonders why a man like Deathmask, cruel and filled with evil, was bestowed an honor of being a Gold Saint, he remembers his master's words about true justice. Thanks to some encouragement from Saori, Shiryu counterattacks, and without warning, the legging of Deathmask's Gold Cloth removes itself from his body. Deathmask's gauntlet does the same, refusing to protect him from Shiryu's attacks. Shiryu informs Deathmask of the Will of the Cloth, which chooses the Saint worthy of wearing it. Sensing Deathmask is no longer worthy of being a Saint of Athena, the Cancer Gold Cloth removes itself from his body. Shiryu removes his Dragon Bronze Cloth to make it a fair fight. Shiryu then awakens his Seventh Sense, blocks Deathmask's Sekishiki and throws him into Yomotsu, killing him. Shun arrives in the House of Cancer, just as Shiryu's soul returns to his body. Roshi suddenly communicates with Shiryu through his Cosmos and informs him Chunli is alive and well. Shiryu suddenly realizes he can see again. Roshi tells him that reaching the Seventh Sense was the cause of the miracle. It was also thanks to the Water of Life that Seiya brought to him and Chunli's prayers. The faces in the House of Cancer disappeared, allowing Deathmask's victims to rest in peace. Shiryu and Shun now head for the House of Leo.
51	"Why! The Gold Lion Showed His Fangs"; Transliteration: "Naze da! Kiba o muita ōgon no shishi" (Japanese: なぜだ! 牙をむいた黄金の獅子)	10.7	October 24, 1987
Seiya arrives at the House of Leo, glad to see Aiolia again, but he acts differently, blocking his path. Aiolia suddenly attacks Seiya with a light speed blow, telling him his suffering will soon end. Meanwhile, on the outskirts of the Sanctuary, a hooded stranger defeats some soldiers in order to enter the 12 Houses. The stranger is revealed to be Eagle Marin. Marin was warned by June, Shun's friend, that Seiya and his friends were fighting the 12 Gold Saints. Seiya confronts Aiolia about why he forgot his promise to fight for Athena, sensing something is wrong with him. Still refusing to listen to Seiya, Aiolia unleashes another attack. Seiya realizes he has to awaken his Seventh Sense once again in order to see through Aiolia's attacks and defeat him. Marin is confronted by Yaki, a giant man who was disqualified from being a Saint, due to his love of killing. While fighting her, Yaki informs Marin that Aiolia will kill Seiya. She doesn't believe him because she knows Aiolia is a righteous man with a kind heart. Marin takes a risk and throws herself along with Yaki off a cliff. As they both fall, Marin sends her Cosmos to Seiya, allowing him to see through Aiolia's light speed blow and finally landing a kick to his face.
52	"Arles! The Legendary Imperial Satanic Illusion"; Transliteration: "Āres! Dentsetsu no maōken" (Japanese: アーレス! 伝説の魔皇拳)	11.1	October 31, 1987
Aiolia recovers with piercing red eyes and a murderous look on his face. He then attacks Seiya, breaking his right leg. Seiya wonders how Aiolia went from a benevolent man to a bloodthirsty demon. Meanwhile, Cassios, Seiya's rival and Shaina's student, is looking after her after Aiolia left her with him to see Pope Arles. In her sleep, Shaina mentions Seiya's name. Angered, Cassios storms out of his home, remembering Seiya cutting off his left ear and defeating him, earning the Pegasus Bronze Cloth. While in town, Cassios overhears soldiers talking about Seiya reaching the House of Leo. When he comes back, Shaina has woken up and Cassios informs her about Seiya and his friends. Shaina is relieved about the House of Leo, but tries to leave when she realizes Virgo Shaka is their next opponent. Cassios tells her that Aiolia is under the control of Pope Arles' Imperial Satanic Illusion, which controls the opponent's brain. While Aiolia was fighting Shaka, Arles sprung his Illusion on him. The illusion activates when the victim is attacked, and changes him into a demon. The illusion will disappear when someone dies in front of him. Shaina tries to leave, but Cassios knocks her out cold and heads for the House of Leo. Meanwhile, Aiolia is still launching merciless attacks at Seiya.
53	"He's a Man! Cassios Dies for Love"; Transliteration: "Otoko da! Kashiosu ai ni shisu" (Japanese: 男だ! カシオス愛に死す)	11.6	November 7, 1987
While Seiya is still at the mercy of the possessed Aiolia, Shiryu and Shun rush to the House of Leo. However, Cassios, stands in their way and defeats them. He then heads to the House of Leo. Seiya is still struggling to see Aiolia's light speed blow to help Shiryu and Shun, but to no avail. While suffering Aiolia's Lightning Bolt and his most powerful attack, Lightning Plasma, Seiya is about to be killed. Suddenly, Cassios appears, but to Seiya's surprise, he attacks Aiolia and tells him to go to the House of Virgo. Cassios says he is doing this for Shaina, who wanted her to be happy. He reveals Aiolia is under the Pope's illusion and tries to restrain him to try to get him back to normal. Seiya is confused as to why, but Cassios didn't want Shaina to be sad if he died. As Aiolia fires another Lightning Plasma, Cassios takes the attack at full force, sacrificing himself. Seiya once again awakens his Seventh Sense, avoids the Lightning Plasma and fires a monstrous Pegasus Meteor Fist, striking Aiolia from the Pope's mind control. Unfortunately, Cassios has died due to the attack. Shiryu and Shun arrive at the House, and Aiolia is released from the illusion. Seiya mourns the loss of his rival who protected him. Aiolia says Cassios' death was not in vain. The fifth flame on the clock vanishes, leaving seven hours to go.
54	"Ikki! The Phoenix's Clipped Wings"; Transliteration: "Ikki! Tsubasa o mogareta fushichō" (Japanese: 一輝! 翼をもがれた不死鳥)	12.0	November 14, 1987
Aiolia heals Seiya's leg and warns the Bronze Saints to not let Virgo Shaka, the Gold Saint closest to God, open his eyes or everyone around him will perish. With that warning, the three Saints head for the House of Virgo. At Canon Island, Sanctuary soldiers attack the villagers, looking for Ikki. They have the village elder and his granddaughter Elene take them to the volcano, but he refuses to lead them any further. The soldiers torture him, but as Elene cries for help, Ikki appears before them. He quickly kills the soldiers, but two Silver Saints appear before Ikki; Pavo Shiva and Lotus Agora, both pupils of Virgo Shaka. Ikki attacks, but he is paralyzed by something strange. Elene's grandfather unfortunately dies due to the soldiers' beatings. Elene begs for help, but Shiva attacks her. Ikki uses his Phoenix Illusion, but it fails, as both he and Agora are enlightened, thanks to Shaka's teachings. As Ikki is attacked by Shiva, Shun feels his brother is in trouble, but is confident he can win. Elene survived, and thanks to her words, Ikki gets back up. Agora jumps into the fray, ready to attack, but Ikki is immobilized again.
55	"Bonds of Friendship! Athena's Cry"; Transliteration: "Yūjō no kizuna! Atena no sakebi" (Japanese: 友情のきずな! アテナの叫び)	11.9	November 21, 1987
Ikki is attacked and near death. Saori and Shun can't feel his Cosmos. Thanks to Elene, Ikki suddenly realises as long as someone like Elene needs him, he awakens and saves her. He stands to fight against Shiva and Agora, willing to fight for his friends, or die trying. Unfortunately, Ikki is still at a disadvantage. Shaka is the one revealed to be immobilizing Ikki, but Saori blocks his Cosmos to free him and tells him to keep fighting as his friends are waiting for him. Ikki finally counterattacks, and is able to block Shiva and Agora's best moves. The Silver Saints gain the upper hand momentarily, but Ikki makes a comeback and kills them with his Rising Phoenix. Ikki comes back to Elene, victorious, but wonders who Shaka might be. Meanwhile, Seiya, Shiryu and Shun finally arrive at the House of Virgo.
56	"Shaka! The Man Closest to a God"; Transliteration: "Shaka! Mottomo kami ni chikai otoko" (Japanese: シャカ! もっとも神に近い男)	12.3	November 28, 1987
As Seiya and his friends enter the House of Virgo, they feel a Cosmos filled with peace and serenity. They then encounter Virgo Shaka. Seiya attacks, but Shaka sends his attack back at him. Shiryu's Rising Dragon and Shun's Nebula Chain are useless against him as well. With a single attack, Shaka knocks out all three Saints. But as he is about to finish Shun, Shaka is attacked by a Phoenix feather. Ikki suddenly appears before the Gold Saint. As punishment for hurting his finger, Shaka has made a lake of blood appear at Ikki's feet. Refusing to accept Shaka as a holy being, Ikki evaporates the blood with his strengthened Cosmos. Shaka reveals that he was the one immobilizing Ikki at Canon Island. He realizes the Gold Saint could be an incarnation of Buddha. Ikki is suddenly frozen where he stands once again, and Shaka uses his Six Incarnation technique, which shows the opponent the six worlds of the Afterlife, and he must choose one. The worlds are of Hell, Hungry Demons, the Beast World, Asura, World of Human Emotions, and Heaven. Ikki falls unconscious, while Shaka wonders which of the worlds the Phoenix ended up in.
57	"The Terror of Nothingness! Shaka Opened His Eyes"; Transliteration: "Mu no kyōfu! Me o aketa Shaka" (Japanese: 無の恐怖! 目をあけたシャカ)	12.6	December 5, 1987
Rain comes pouring down in the Sanctuary, and Pope Arles is confident that Shaka will kill the Bronze Saints. Ikki suddenly awakens and attacks Shaka with his Phoenix Illusion. Unfortunately for Ikki, he is feeling the effects of his own illusion and sees a traumatizing event from his past. Shaka then destroys the Phoenix Bronze Cloth without any effort and twists Ikki's body. Ikki recovers and tries to escape, unfortunately, he doesn't get very far. Shaka attacks, but Ikki reappears with his Phoenix Cloth restored, swearing to attack until Shaka is defeated. Suddenly, Shaka burns his Cosmos brighter than before, using his Ring of Heaven's Treasure, a technique uniting offense and defense. It is also capable of destroying the enemy's five senses, one by one. Shaka then opens his eyes, much to Ikki's horror. Ikki loses his Cloth again and loses his sense of touch. Next, he loses his sense of smell. Ikki confronts Shaka and demands to know why he fights for Pope Arles. Shaka then eliminates his sense of taste, paralyzing his tongue. Ikki then loses his sense of sight, blinding him. Since Ikki can still hear, Shaka answers his question, that he fights for Athena and for justice. He sees Pope Arles as justice. Now finally, Ikki's sense of hearing is eliminated.
58	"Heroic! Ikki Died For Friendship"; Transliteration: "Soretsu! Yūjō ni chitta Ikki" (Japanese: 壮烈! 友情に散った一輝)	13.2	December 12, 1987
Outside, six flames from the clock burned out, only six hours remain. Ikki only has his mind and heart left. As Shaka delivers the final blow, Shun wakes up and stops Shaka, but Ikki informs Shun that he will defeat the Gold Saint. Shaka attacks, but Ikki's Cosmos block the technique and expands more and more. Seiya and Shiryu awake to see Ikki's Cosmos getting stronger. Shaka uses his Ring of Heaven's Treasure to destroy Ikki's sixth sense, with only his heart beating. Shun steps up to fight, but Ikki's Cosmos burns brighter than before. Without all of his six senses, Ikki reaches the Seventh Sense. He suddenly appears behind Shaka, realizing that he keeps his eyes closed to increase his Cosmos and releases it once he opens his eyes. Ikki also allowed Shaka to destroy his senses on purpose to increase his Cosmos. He then takes a hold of Shaka, ready to die with him. In a sudden burst of power, both travel trillions of miles away. Before that, Ikki bids farewell to Shun and tells him to fight like a man until the end. The only thing remaining after the blast is the Virgo Gold Cloth. Shun is tearful at his older brother's sacrifice, but Seiya and Shiryu don't have time to mourn Ikki and head for the House of Libra. As Shun remembers Ikki's last words, he swears his brother's death will not be in vain, and joins his friends to go to the next House.
59	"Revive Cygnus! With Life, Death, and Love"; Transliteration: "Yomigaere hakucho! Iki to shi to ai to" (Japanese: 甦れ白鳥! 生と死と愛と)	13.6	December 19, 1987
As the rain ends, Aiolia takes Cassios to Shaina, and senses Shaka's defeat. He also wonders when the bloodshed in this battle will end. Shaina suddenly appears and is horrified to see Cassios dead. Aiolia tells her that he was responsible for Cassios' death and that he sacrificed himself to free him from Arles' illusion. Shaina remembers Cassios' kindness towards her and realizes that he loved her. Enraged, Shaina goes to the 12 Houses but Aiolia stops her and knocks her unconscious. While Shaina rests in bed, Aiolia buries Cassios, makes him a grave and asks him to watch over Shaina forever. Seiya and his friends arrive at the House of Libra and are shocked to find Hyoga frozen in ice. Shiryu deduces that Aquarius Camus froze Hyoga, but they sense that Hyoga is barely alive. Seiya uses his Pegasus Meteor Fist, but it doesn't even make a dent. The coffin is so strong that all the Gold Saints together can't destroy it. Suddenly, the Gold Cloth of Libra, sent by Roshi, appears before them. It is different than the other 11 Gold Cloths because it holds six pairs of weapons; the Twin Rod, Sword, Spear, Triple Rod, Tonfa and Shield. 12 weapons in total, meant for the Gold Saints. However, they are only used if Athena and the Gold Saint of Libra allow it. Shiryu carefully chooses the Golden Sword to break the coffin and free Hyoga. His heart is barely beating, but Shun offers to save him. As the seventh hour is up, Seiya and Shiryu head for the House of Scorpio. Shun burns his Cosmos to warm Hyoga up from the inside, risking his own life to save his friend.
60	"Hyoga Revives! I'll Put My Life on the Line"; Transliteration: "Hyōga fukkatsu! Kono inochi kakete" (Japanese: 氷河復活! この命かけて)	13.9	December 26, 1987
Shun remembers Ikki's last words, and the battle that earned him the Andromeda Bronze Cloth, but realizes the right thing to do is to save Hyoga. Seiya and Shiryu enter the House of Scorpio, and sense Shun's Cosmos exploding. Shiryu remembers an old fable of a rabbit sacrificing its life to save a traveler, and it resembles Shun's destiny of Andromeda, who sacrificed her life to save her people. Suddenly, Scorpio Milo appears before them and uses his Restriction to stop them in their tracks. Shiryu attacks with his Rising Dragon but Milo easily evades the attack. Hearing Shiryu's statement that he avoided it, Milo challenges him to attack again, with him not moving this time. Shiryu attacks again, but Milo blocks the attack and sends him flying. Seiya awakens his Seventh Sense and manages to land a blow against Milo's face, even though it was only a scratch. Milo counterattacks before Seiya is able to catch a glimpse of his attack. Both Saints stand up prepared to fight the Gold Saint and attack him together. Milo counterattacks again with his Scarlet Needle, leaving both paralyzed by the stinging pain from the Scarlet Needle. The Gold Saint is about to launch the final blow, but Hyoga appears with an unconscious Shun in his arms. Hyoga then tells his friends to get up, saying that all four will make it to the Pope's chambers together.
61	"Surrender or Death! As Long as I Still Have These Wings"; Transliteration: "Kōfuku ka shi ka! Kono tsubasa aru kagiri" (Japanese: 降伏か死か! この翼ある限り)	14.3	January 9, 1988
Milo's Restriction is useless against Hyoga, so in retaliation, he uses his Ring of Ice to immobilize Milo. He then tells Seiya and Shiryu to leave with Shun and go on to the next House. Meanwhile, Tatsumi arrives to Saori's side. Sanctuary soldiers arrive to kill Saori, so Tatsumi holds them off. Mu and Kiki suddenly leave, but as Tatsumi can no longer distract them, Unicorn Jabu, Lionet Ban, Hydra Ichi, Bear Geki, and Wolf Nachi appear to defeat the soldiers. They inform Tatsumi that after their defeat during the Galaxian War Tournament, Saori allowed them to return to their training places to get stronger. They have returned to protect Athena while they wait for Seiya and his friends to return. As Milo frees himself, he and Hyoga begin their battle. Both their attacks clash, but Hyoga is struck by Milo's Scarlet Needle. Milo explains that his Scarlet Needle has 15 strikes, the same number as the stars of the Scorpio constellation. He then gives Hyoga the choice to surrender or die. Since Hyoga refuses and keeps using Diamond Dust, he receives more strikes. When Hyoga receives the 14th needle, Milo is ready to use Antares, the final blow of the Scarlet Needle, also known as the heart of the Scorpio constellation. Hyoga points out that Milo's feet are frozen to the ground, due to the several Diamond Dust attacks he has unleashed. Unable to move, Milo is then struck by the Aurora Thunder Attack.
62	"Forge Ahead Hyoga! The Proud Hero"; Transliteration: "Susume Hyōga! Hokori takaki yūsha" (Japanese: 進め氷河! 誇り高き勇者)	14.9	January 16, 1988
As Milo recovers, Hyoga starts bleeding heavily due to the 14 Scarlet Needle strikes. He also begins to lose his five senses. Milo then reveals what Camus' true intentions were back at the House of Libra. Camus wanted Hyoga to reach the Seventh Sense. All he did was to test him. Since Hyoga couldn't forget his mother and reach the Ultimate Cosmos, Camus had no choice but to strike Hyoga with his ultimate attack and freeze him. Camus didn't want any of the Gold Saints to kill him, so he chose to do it himself, willing to wait hundreds of years for him to come back to life, despite knowing that Hyoga eventually would find a way to escape the coffin and keep fighting. Milo agrees to spare Hyoga's life for Camus' sake and tells him to leave the Sanctuary. Hyoga refuses, saying it was useless for him to be frozen like that, and will fight alongside his friends until the end. Meanwhile, the eighth hour is up. Tatsumi has sent Geki to retrieve something, and Seiya and Shiryu, with Shun in his arms, head for the House of Sagittarius. Hyoga stands up, saying his mother's memory is always with him, and will fight, knowing his friends risked their lives for him. Hyoga launches his final Diamond Dust while Milo launches Antares. Milo strikes and it seems that he is victorious. However, Milo's 15 star points were frozen, and he realizes Hyoga did it while he launched his Diamond Dust and Milo was striking with Antares. Hyoga managed to awaken the Seventh Sense, and if Milo had not been wearing the Gold Cloth, he would have died. Suddenly, Hyoga crawls on the ground, struggling to leave. Milo suddenly realizes that Saori Kido is the true Athena and saves Hyoga's life, stopping the bleeding and his senses slowly returning. As Hyoga leaves, Camus looks on from the House of Aquarius.
63	"Resound! The Gold Cloths of the Sanctuary"; Transliteration: "Hibike! Sankuchuari no Gōrudo Kurosu" (Japanese: 響け! 聖域のゴールドクロス)	15.4	January 23, 1988
Geki returns, bringing with him Saori's Golden Scepter. As Tatsumi places it in her hand, it glows and summons the Sagittarius Gold Cloth right in front of Jabu and the others. Tatsumi believes that Athena is returning the Cloth to Aiolos. The Saints question him, so Tatsumi reveals the story of when Mitsumasa Kido met Aiolos. After the story, there is a vibrating sound all across the Sanctuary. All 12 Gold Cloths resonate, since they are all now in the Sanctuary after 13 years. Pope Arles, the Gold Saints, Seiya and his friends, Shaina, and even Marin, who has survived her fall from the cliff, sense the resonance. Pope Arles starts to get so nervous that he starts to have hallucinations of the Saints, Aiolos and Athena. The Sagittarius Gold Cloth goes into the House of Sagittarius, just as Seiya and his friends go into the House. The Sagittarius Gold Cloth suddenly shoots an arrow at Seiya.
64	"Young Men! I Entrust Athena to You"; Transliteration: "Shōnen yo! Kimitachi ni Atena o takusu" (Japanese: 少年よ! 君たちにアテナを託す)	15.7	January 30, 1988
The arrow barely miss Seiya's heart and hits the wall. Shun wakes up and sees that a giant hole opens up in the wall. Since there is no exit, the Saints decide to go through the hole, shortly after Hyoga arrives in time to join them. As they pass through a narrow passage, the roof above them tries to crush them. Shiryu stays behind and allows his friends to go through. He then destroys the rock and is seemingly crushed. As the Saints move on, they fall into a cavern. Suddenly it gets flooded and Hyoga stays behind to stop the flood. However, he gets caught up in it and is knocked out cold. Seiya and Shun try to swing from one end of a cliff to another, but only one can go through. Shun allows Seiya to go through while Shun falls to the bottom. Seiya barely makes it, but as he tries to climb up, he keeps falling. Thinking of Saori and his friends, he tries to keep going, but can't seem to reach the top. Just as he is about to give up, a warm Cosmos covers Seiya, restoring his energy. It does the same for Shiryu, Hyoga, and Shun, it tells all four to save Athena. As Seiya reaches the top, the Sagittarius Gold Cloth is there, and it teleports him and the others back to the House. The Cloth fires another arrow and hits another wall, revealing a message written in Greek. Seiya is in tears, revealing Aiolos' testament. It read, "To the young men who have come here, I entrust you with Athena's life." The four Bronze Saints are overcome with emotion, realizing what a great person Aiolos was, and how he entrusted them with the person he cared for the most. All of those traps were tests to see if they were worthy of reading that message. The exit appears before them, with the Bronze Saints swearing to protect Athena now and forever.
65	"The Holy Sword Roars! Shura vs. Dragon"; Transliteration: "Unaru seiken! Shura tai Doragon" (Japanese: うなる聖剣! シュラ対ドラゴン)	16.2	February 6, 1988
The sun sets and there are three hours left. Seiya and his friends have reached the House of Capricorn. Inside, they discover a statue of Athena. Shiryu explains the meaning of the statue: to reward her most loyal warrior, Athena rewarded him with the sacred sword, Excalibur. The Saints head outside, since the Gold Saint of Capricorn didn't show himself. Suddenly, a flash of light splits the ground, separating Shiryu from his friends. However, Shiryu had actually pushed them to the other side to save his friends and fight the one responsible: the Gold Saint, Capricorn Shura. Hyoga and the others, left with no choice, head to the House of Aquarius. Shura's technique are capable of slicing through anything, like the sword Excalibur. He is also proud to be the most loyal warrior of Athena. Shura then tells Shiryu that 13 years ago, he was the one who killed Aiolos, who was branded a traitor. Aiolos wore his Cloth and almost won the battle, but he couldn't attack Shura again, because the baby Athena was at his feet. Shura unleashed another Excalibur and struck Aiolos. Even though Aiolos was near death, he escaped to bring Athena to safety. Shura refuses to believe Aiolos wasn't a traitor and continues his assault. Shiryu strikes back with a powerful Rising Dragon, but to no avail. To Shiryu's shock, Shura slices the Dragon Cloth and Shield into pieces. However, Shiryu was able to block the last blow and increase his Cosmos, revealing the Dragon on his back. Shiryu swears to defeat Shura and avenge Aiolos, even if he must take the Gold Saint with him.
66	"Ah Shiryū! Become a Star and Vanish"; Transliteration: "Aa Shiryū! Hoshi to natte kiyu" (Japanese: ああ紫龍! 星となって消ゆ)	16.8	February 13, 1988
Shiryu promises to take Shura with him if necessary. Unfortunately, as Shiryu attacks with his Rising Dragon, Shura discovers his weak point and attacks him there. However, he showed it to Shura on purpose to break his left arm. Shiryu is able to dodge Shura's attack even while seriously injured, and prepares to use a technique forbidden by his master, Roshi. The technique, known as the Final Dragon, is an unbeatable attack, and no one can stand its absolute force. Unfortunately, it's a double-edge technique, not only does it kill the enemy, but the one who unleashes it as well. Meanwhile, Seiya, Hyoga and Shun reach the House of Aquarius, and the tenth flame on the clock extinguishes. As Shiryu attacks, Shura strikes his heart again, but can't release his right arm. Shiryu cuts Shura's arm off and unleashes the Final Dragon. Shiryu holds on to Shura, and both rise into the sky at an incredible speed. Shiryu apologizes to his master and entrusts Athena to his friends. Seiya, Hyoga, Shun, and even Chunli and his master can see Shiryu rising like a shooting star. As they rise faster and faster, Shura realises who Athena really was, the baby he almost killed when he fought Aiolos. Saori speaks to Shiryu and tells him not to die but he apologizes for sacrificing himself. Shura, realizing his terrible mistake, apologizes to both Shiryu and Aiolos. Unfortunately, they reach outer space, with Shura saying they will turn into stardust and watch over Athena. Back on Earth, Seiya and the others sense Shiryu's Cosmos disappearing and mourns as Shun shouts their friend.
67	"Farewell! My teacher, my friends" Transliteration: "Saraba! Waga shi yo waga tomo yo" (Japanese: さらば! 我が師よ我が友よ)	17.5	February 20, 1988
After Shiryu's sacrifice, Hyoga orders Seiya and Shun to go to the next House while he fights Camus alone. Inside, Hyoga thanks Camus for his teachings through Crystal, ready to battle his grandmaster once again. As Camus block Hyoga's Diamond Dust and freezes his legs, Hyoga remembers Crystal explaining the Absolute Zero (273.15 degrees below zero). Camus explain that in a battle between Saints of ice, the one whose cold is closest to the Absolute Zero would win the battle. However, Camus' ultimate attack, Aurora Execution doesn't work on Hyoga anymore. Hyoga uses the Aurora Thunder Attack, but to no avail. Camus freezes his student in a coffin once again. However, Hyoga, remembering the struggle of his friends and Shiryu's sacrifice, is able to break the coffin from the inside. He did it by lowering his temperature near the Absolute Zero. Then, Camus and Hyoga unleash rays of cold air, and to Camus' surprise, they are evenly matched. Camus explains that unless he freezes his Gold Cloth, Hyoga will never win. The temperature for that to happen is the Absolute Zero. With words of encouragement from his loved ones, Hyoga unleashes a full blast of cold air, freezing the right shoulder on Camus' cloth, but the Cygnus Cloth is destroyed in the process. Camus is about to launch the Aurora Execution, but Hyoga does the same position, attempting to do the same technique. Both grandmaster and grandstudent launch the technique, and both waves of ice clash. Outside, Seiya and Shun sense Hyoga's Cosmos disappear, as they head for the last House, the House of Pisces. Camus, whose entire Gold Cloth is now frozen, exclaims that he is proud of Hyoga for mastering his technique and the Seventh Sense, but falls to the ground dead, apologizing to him. Hyoga, covered in ice as well, thanks his grandmaster and collapses shortly after into a near-death state.
68	"Warrior of Beauty! Aphrodite"; Transliteration: "Bi no senshi! Afurodīte" (Japanese: 美の戦士! アフロディーテ)	18.1	February 27, 1988
Jabu and his friends sense Hyoga's Cosmo vanishing and decides to help Seiya, but Jabu stops them, thinking they won't be of any help. He believes Seiya and Shun will make it in time. Pope Arles mysteriously talks to himself again about the victories and losses of the recent battles. He also has plenty of confidence on the Gold Saint of Pisces. Meanwhile, Shun asks Seiya to go to the Pope's chambers while he fights the Gold Saint by himself. Even though Seiya is concerned because of his destiny, Shun isn't worried because of his brother's words and his master Albiore's teachings. The eleventh fire burns out, only one hour remains. Seiya and Shun reach the House, and encounter the warrior of beauty, Pisces Aphrodite. Seiya dashes past Aphrodite and Shun stops him with his chains. Aphrodite, however, says Seiya will die along the way. Seiya finally passes all 12 Houses, but he discovers that the path to the Pope's chambers is covered in roses. Seiya starts running, but he feels numb and suddenly collapses.
69	"Demon Roses! Sweet Fragrance of Death"; Transliteration: "Demon Rōzu! Amaki shi no kaori" (Japanese: デモンローズ! 甘き死の香り)	18.6	March 12, 1988
Aphrodite explains that the roses are known as Royal Demon Roses, poisonous roses that can kill someone with their thorns or pollen. Seiya will lose his five senses and soon die. He then reveals that he is the assassin of Shun's master Albiore. Alongside Scorpio Milo, they went to Andromeda Island. Albiore was as strong as a Gold Saint even though he was a Silver Saint, so Milo struggled and was slowly approaching defeat. Aphrodite threw a rose and poisoned Albiore, paralyzing him and leaving him vulnerable for Milo's killing blow. Shun attacks, ready to avenge his master, but falls victim to the Royal Demon Roses. Shun thinks back to his training on Andromeda Island while training with Reda, Spica, and June. Shun was willing to try the Sacrifice Ritual to earn the Andromeda Bronze Cloth. June tried to get him to quit and go back to Japan, as she was worried about him. Shun, however, was determined to go through with it and go back to Japan with the Cloth, to see Ikki again. Before the ritual, Shun defeated Spica and Reda. The ritual consisted of Shun being tied to rocks by the Andromeda Chain. If he burned his Cosmos to the limit and cut the chain, he will earn the Andromeda Cloth. Albiore believed that a Saint should also have a heart as kind as Shun's, and wanted to see that he could prove it. Shun burned and exploded his Cosmos, allowing him to break the chain, earning the Andromeda Bronze Cloth. Back to the present, Shun stands up, ready to fight again. With Shun's Circle Chain, he is able to block Aphrodite's Royal Demon Rose with Rolling Defense and repel the attack. Shun tries to end the battle with his Thunder Wave, but a black rose stops the attack.
70	"Rest in Peace! Shun's Last Smile"; Transliteration: "Yasuraka ni! Shun, saigo no bishō" (Japanese: 安らかに! 瞬、最後の微笑)	19.1	March 19, 1988
Just as Shun was about to deal the final blow, Aphrodite's black rose, Piranian Rose, devours and destroys both Chains and the Andromeda Cloth. Suddenly, Shun's Cosmos burns brighter, and remembers when he showed his master Albiore his true power. Shun awakens the Seventh Sense and unleash the Nebula Stream, which not only attacks, but also immobilizes the opponent. However, Aphrodite pulls out a white rose, known as the Bloody Rose, which attaches itself to one's heart, absorbing all the blood. When it turns red, the opponent will die. Aphrodite, who believes the Pope's logic of power equalling justice, launches the rose and it attaches to Shun's heart. Shun explodes his Cosmos and unleashes the Nebula Storm, killing Aphrodite and avenging his master. Shun apologizes to Seiya for not being able to save him and prepares to join his friends and brother in the afterlife as the rose absorbs all the blood in his heart. Meanwhile, as Marin rushes to save Seiya, Phaeton and his men corner her and try to kill her. Surprisingly, Shaina helps her out. She defeats Phaeton and Marin takes him to show her a quick passage through the 12 Houses while Shaina defeats a group of soldiers. Time is running out for both Saori and Seiya.
71	"The Fire Clock Extinguishes! The True Face of the Pope"; Transliteration: "Kieru Hidokei! Kyōkō no shōtai" (Japanese: 消える火時計! 教皇の正体)	19.6	March 26, 1988
Marin finally reaches Seiya and is able to help him get closer to the Pope's chambers by having him wear her mask and stop breathing the pollen. However, Marin collapses on the way. In anger, Seiya destroys all the roses with his Pegasus Meteor Fist. Shaina appears and offers to take care of Marin while Seiya goes to the Pope. Seiya enters the chambers and confronts the Pope, but is confused about his attitude. He seems to be ashamed of what he has done. Even though the Pope says he can't remove the arrow, he tells Seiya how he can save her. Beyond the Pope's chambers is the Temple of Athena, which holds a statue of her and a shield. The Pope explains that Nike, the goddess of victory, takes the form of Saori's golden scepter. The Shield of Justice, which blocks any evil attack, can save her. Seiya needs to aim the shield in Saori's direction and make the arrow disappear. As Seiya leaves, the Pope's hair and personality completely change and he becomes evil. Meanwhile, Marin tells Shaina that she went to Star Hill, where the Pope goes to see the stars and predict the future. Marin went to find some clues about why the Pope has changed. There, she found the real Pope's corpse, which has been dead for over 10 years. Shaina deduces that the one in the chambers is the one who killed the real Pope. Meanwhile, the imposter plans to steal the scepter and shield in order to be superior to Zeus, Poseidon and Hades themselves. Suddenly, the Gemini Gold Cloth covers him, revealing him to be the Gold Saint Gemeni Saga. The imposter uses Another Dimension on Seiya, but something keeps him from doing it. Instead, he takes away Seiya's sense of taste.
72	"Go Seiya! Get over the death of friends" Transliteration: "Ike Seiya! Tomo no shi koete" (Japanese: 行け星矢! 友の死をこえて)	20.2	April 9, 1988
The Gemini Saint destroys Seiya's remaining senses and waits for the fire clock to run out. At the House of Aries, Mu senses Shaka calling out to him through his Cosmos. He requires his telekinetic help to transport him and Ikki to the House of Virgo. Shaka restores Ikki's senses and his Cloth, and sends him to help Seiya. Ikki asked why Shaka helped him, and he responds that he was wrong and believes in the new world they will create. Ikki then heads to the Pope's chambers. Seiya burns his Cosmos brighter than before and attacks Saga with his Pegasus Meteor Fist. The attack accelerates and knocks Gemini down. Seiya heads to the Temple of Athena, but Gemini attacks him again. Seiya uses the Pegasus Rolling Crash against Gemini, but it isn't sufficient as Seiya's strength is running out. Gemini is about to deal the fatal blow, when the face of Justice on his helmet begins to cry. Gemini claims that he will save the world from being invaded by the gods and crush whoever stands in his way. Suddenly, Ikki appears to face Gemini, ready to fight for his departed friends and brother. Seiya, still weakened, heads to the Temple while Ikki keeps Gemini busy. Just then, he hears the voices of Shun, Shiryu and Hyoga through his Cosmos, urging him to continue. He finally reaches the statue and shield of Athena. Ikki is able to keep coming back to stop Gemini, but he is defeated. Seiya finally gets a hold of the shield and tries to aim it at Saori, but Gemini strikes him and drops the shield. The fire clock has run out, time's up. Saga is confident in his victory. However, the shield's light managed to reflect on Saori, making the arrow disappear, saving her life.
73	"Gather, Friends! Under Athena's Guidance"; Transliteration: "Tsudoe tomo yo! Atena no moto ni" (Japanese: 集え友よ! アテナのもとに)	20.6	April 16, 1988
Saori has survived, while Roshi reveals to the surviving Gold Saints about Saori being Athena and what had happened to Aiolos and the real Pope. The killer was Gemini Saga, who suffers from both good and evil personalities, and the evil one has taken over. Roshi orders the Gold Saints to present themselves before her. Saori, Tatsumi and the other Bronze Saints start going through the 12 Houses. Saga is torturing Seiya back at the Temple of Athena, but Ikki comes back to fight once again. As Saori crosses the 12 Houses, Mu, Aldebaran, Aiolia, Shaka and Milo swear allegiance to her. She also revives Shiryu, Hyoga and Shun at the Houses of Capricorn, Aquarius and Pisces. All of them finally make their way to the temple. Ikki is defeated, but Saori and her Bronze and Gold Saints arrive. Shiryu, Hyoga and Shun reach the Seventh Sense and attack Saga together, but their attacks don't seem to work. They are knocked down, but Seiya gets up once again. Marin and Shaina arrive just as Shiryu and the others get up. Seiya and his friends burn their Cosmos to reach the Seventh Sense, and gains their senses back. Their Cosmos unite with Seiya's and he fires a powerful Pegasus Meteor Fist which sends Saga flying. Seiya, Shiryu, Hyoga, Shun and Ikki collapse from exhaustion, but Saga comes back. As the Gold Saints face him, Saori stands up to face Saga herself, believing that if people love one another, the world will be saved. Saga attacks her, but his Gold Cloth removes itself from his body. Saori reveals that Seiya's attack destroyed Saga's evil personality. Saga then commits suicide by allowing himself to be struck by Saori's scepter. Saga turns back to normal, and apologizes before dying. Thanks to Seiya and his friends, peace has returned to the Sanctuary and the world.

=== Season 5 (1988) ===
No.	Title	Rating	Original release date
74	"Enemies of the Northern Pole! The Legendary God Warriors"; Transliteration: "Kyokuhoku no teki! Densetsu no Goddo Wōriā" (Japanese: 極北の敵! 伝説の神闘士)	20.1	April 23, 1988
In Asgard, a land filled with snow in Northern Europe, a woman known as Polaris Hilda, representative of the Norse God Odin, prays to preserve the peace in her land. Suddenly, a mysterious force speaks to her, urging her to destroy the Sanctuary. Hilda refuses, so she is swept away by the force. When she recovers, a strange ring is on her finger, and she calls upon the God Robes of the Asgard God Warriors. Seven warriors are granted these sacred Robes: Siegfried is granted the Dubhe God Robe Robe of the Alpha star, Hägen is granted the Merak God Robe of the Beta star, Thor is granted the Phecda God Robe of the Gamma star, Alberich is granted the Megrez God Robe of the Delta star, Fenrir is granted the Alioth God Robe of the Epsilon star, Syd is granted the Mizar God Robe of the Zeta star, and Mime is granted the Benetnasch God Robe of the Eta star. All seven God Warriors gather ready to serve Hilda. Syd is sent to the Sanctuary and defeats Taurus Aldebaran with one blow. Syd then arrives in Japan, and his target is Saori. He defeats Jabu, Nachi, Ban, Geki and Ichi easily. As Syd is about to attack Saori, Shun arrives with his Andromeda New Bronze Cloth and restrains Syd. Seiya arrives with his Pegasus New Bronze Cloth immediately afterwards, dealing a kick which takes Syd by surprise and sends him crashing to the ground. When Syd retaliates with his Viking Tiger Claw, Seiya and Shun realize that he is just as strong as the Gold Saints. Saori is confused because Hilda is a peaceful person and Syd reveals that Hilda will take over the Sanctuary. Shun is next to fight, but is distracted and defeated. Ikki comes to his rescue, with his Phoenix New Bronze Cloth. Seiya comes back to redeem himself and is able to strike Syd with his Pegasus Meteor Fist. However, he was injured by Syd's Viking Tiger Claw. Saori stops Seiya from fighting, just as Shiryu and Hyoga arrive with their Dragon an Cygnus New Bronze Cloths. Syd, acknowledging the fact that he must defeat the five Bronze Saints in order to kill Athena, retreats for now. Saori and her Saints plan their strategy and head to Asgard.
75	"Hilda! The Goddess Entranced by Devils"; Transliteration: "Hiruda! Akuma ni miirareta megami" (Japanese: ヒルダ! 悪魔に魅入られた女神)	18.8	April 30, 1988
In Asgard, Hyoga is escaping with a young girl named Freya, Hilda's younger sister. Asgard soldiers trap Hyoga and try to convince Freya to come back to her sister, but she refuses, hoping that Athena will save her sister. Hyoga defeats the soldiers. Then, Saori appears before Hyoga and Freya. Seiya, Shun and Kiki arrive, and Freya explains that Hilda is not acting like herself. The worst part is, the world is now in danger. Hilda was praying to stop the Polar ice caps from melting, but since Hilda stopped praying, the ice caps are melting and will flood the Earth. Hilda and her God Warriors suddenly appear before them. Saori notices the ring on Hilda's finger. The ring is known as the Nibelung Ring, which turns its wearer evil. The Bronze Saints set out to reach the Valhalla Palace and remove the ring from Hilda's finger in order to bring Hilda back to normal. Saori decides to stop the Polar ice caps from melting, but with her power, she can only contain the caps for 12 hours, before the sun sets. Hilda and her God Warriors leave, while Phecda Gamma Thor volunteers to stop the Saints.
76	"The Giant Thor! Cosmo of Hatred"; Transliteration: "Kyojin Tōru! Zōo no Kosumo" (Japanese: 巨人トール! 憎悪のコスモ)	17.5	May 7, 1988
Seiya, Hyoga and Shun rush to find the Valhalla Palace, which is farther away, but the giant God Warrior Thor stands in their way. Shun and Hyoga attack, but are useless against him as he easily breaks free from Hyoga's ice and knocks down Shun with his Cosmo. Seiya decides to distract Thor, allowing Shun and Hyoga to move forward. Seiya stops Thor's Mjolnir Hammer technique with his Pegasus Meteor Fist, but Thor simply changed their direction towards Shun and Hyoga, knocking them out cold. Seiya, now alone, manages to evade Thor's Mjolnir Hammer, but before he is able to counterattack, Thor's Titanic Hercules technique takes him out. Seiya is able to get up again and attacks with his Pegasus Meteor Fist, but Thor is able to block them and attacks again. As he lays in the snow, Seiya tries to figure out how to defeat Thor. Marin reminds him of the battle of the 12 Houses and how he was able to overcome the difficulties to save Athena. She says he has matured and has nothing left to teach him. Seiya remembers what he learned when he fought Taurus Aldebaran and Leo Aiolia, and how desperate he was to save Saori back then. He gets up, ready to fight once more. As Thor attacks again, Seiya tries to see the light speed attack and manages to stop it. He then sends Thor flying and crashing to the ground. Seiya then strikes with the Pegasus Meteor Fist and buries Thor in the snow. However, Thor gets up again, showing off a stronger Cosmo full of hatred. He explains how difficult life has been for the people of Asgard, and hopes that Hilda will lead the people to take control of the Sanctuary and the world. Seiya tries to explain that Hilda is possessed, but Thor ignores him and strikes with his Titanic Hercules, empowered by his strengthened Cosmo.
77	"The Giant's Tears! Dying For Hilda's Cause"; Transliteration: "Kyosei no namida! Hiruda no tame ni shisu" (Japanese: 巨星の涙! ヒルダのために死す)	16.4	May 14, 1988
Thor strikes, with Seiya falling down an icy cliff, and even then, the attacks against Seiya continue. However, he is rescued by Shiryu, who has come from the Five Ancient Peaks of Lushan and brought information from Roshi. The master reveals that to remove the Nibelung Ring, one must have the legendary sword Balmung. To retrieve the sword, the seven Odin Sapphires, the seven God Warriors' guardian stones, must be gathered after defeating them. Shiryu goes to wake up Hyoga and Shun while Seiya distracts Thor, but Seiya is knocked down again. Saori's Cosmos burns brightly and Seiya gets up to fight Thor. As the three Saints continue, Thor stands in their way, but Seiya comes back and executes a powerful Pegasus Meteor Fist which sends the giant crashing into a wall of ice. Saori's Cosmos reminds Thor of when he first met Hilda. Thor used to hunt in the forests near the Valhalla Palace and gave the hunted prey to the poor people of Asgard. As he was hunted by the soldiers, Hilda arrived, apologized to Thor, since he was able to do something she couldn't, and his wound was healed by Hilda's gentle Cosmos. Since Hilda's personality has completely changed, Thor has doubts about her intentions, but he ignores it and continues to fight. After Seiya is able to block Thor's attack, both use their techniques again and clash, with Seiya earning the victory. Thor asks Seiya to restore Hilda to the way she was before, and falls to the ground, dead. Seiya picks up the first Odin Sapphire. The four Bronze Saints decide to split up to defeat the other God Warriors and reach the Valhalla Palace.
78	"Bared Fangs! The Northern Wolf Fenrir"; Transliteration: "Kiba muku! Kita no ookami Fenriru" (Japanese: 牙むく! 北の狼フェンリル)	15.1	May 21, 1988
While Saori tries to keep the polar caps from melting, Kiki and Freya stayed behind to look after her. The Bronze Saints head for different paths. While Shiryu looks for his next opponent, Capricorn Shura's spirit reminds him to protect Athena. It is revealed that when Shiryu used his Final Dragon, Shura loaned his Gold Cloth to him and pushed him back to Earth, with his last words telling him to live on and to protect Athena. At the Valhalla Palace, Siegfried tells Hilda he is confident about his strategy to defeat the Bronze Saints. At a frozen waterfall, Shiryu is suddenly attacked by a pack of wolves, sent by the God Warrior, Alioth Fenrir of the Epsilon star. However, he defeats them with his Rising Dragon. Enraged, Fenrir goes to fight Shiryu, fully confident that he will win. After attacking Shiryu multiple times with his Wolf Cruelty Claw, Fenrir slashes Shiryu's eyes, almost blinding him. Shiryu attacks with his Rising Dragon, but Fenrir is able to dodge it effortlessly and prepares to kill Shiryu.
79	"Sorrow! The Destiny of the Northern Wolf Pack Fist"; Transliteration: "Aware! Nōzan gunroken no shukumei" (Japanese: 哀れ! ノーザン群狼拳の宿命)	13.8	May 28, 1988
Shiryu seems to be no match against Fenrir's ruthless attacks. His friends sense he is in danger, but are confident they will make it to the Valhalla Palace. Meanwhile, Hyoga is followed by another God Warrior. Remembering Shura's sacrifice, Shiryu gets up again, and tries to convince Fenrir that Hilda is possessed, needing the Odin Sapphire to save her and to trust him. Fenrir, however, doesn't believe in people and only trusts his wolves. He then tells Shiryu the reason of his mistrust. Years ago, when Fenrir was six years old, he was part of a distinguished family. One day, he, his parents and their friends rode their horses through the woods. Suddenly, a huge bear slashed Fenrir's mother, killing her. As his father tried fighting off the bear, their friends abandoned them and ran off. Fenrir's father was also killed. Just then, a pack of wolves came to his rescue. From that day on, he was raised by those wolves and cared for them deeply. Later, Fenrir became the Alioth God Warrior and swore loyalty to Hilda. Shiryu is struck down again and almost eaten by the wolves, but Saori's Cosmos weaken the wolves and revitalizes Shiryu. Both warriors face off once again, with Fenrir's Wolf Cruelty Claw easily overpowering Shiryu Rising Dragon.
80	"Vanish in the Frozen Fields! Sad Howling"; Transliteration: "Hyōgen ni kiyu! Kanashiki to boe" (Japanese: 氷原に消ゆ! 悲しき遠吠え)	12.2	June 4, 1988
Shiryu fights back, stating that he believes in his friends and will fight for his beliefs as both warriors clash again. Fenrir keeps fighting for Hilda's sake and backs Shiryu into a corner. The Rising Dragon is useless to Fenrir and Shiryu has seen through his techniques as well. Shiryu gets an idea and uses the Rising Dragon against the frozen waterfall, causing a massive avalanche, with both him and Fenrir caught up in it. The avalanche ends, and the wolves desperately look for Fenrir while Shiryu emerges from the debris. The wolves find Fenrir, but he has died, with the pack howling at the sky. Shiryu retrieves the Odin Sapphire, and hopes that Fenrir will be born again, with friends and more faith in humanity. As he walks away, the wolves attack Shiryu and they fall down into an ice cavern. The wolves die and Shiryu falls unconscious. Meanwhile, Hyoga encounters the God Warrior Merak Hägen, who is angry and jealous with him because he believes Freya was tricked by Hyoga. With his Diamond Dust useless against Hägen, Hyoga remembers his grandmaster Aquarius Camus' sacrifice for him to master the Absolute Zero and the Seventh Sense. Both warriors prepare to face off.
81	"Freya! A Life and Death Struggle due to Love"; Transliteration: "Furea! Ai yue no shito" (Japanese: フレア! 愛ゆえの死闘)	10.9	June 11, 1988
Hägen unleashes the mighty technique Universe Freezing against Hyoga, but it is useless against him as he easily breaks free. Hyoga then tells Hägen that he let himself be captured by Asgard soldiers to discover what happened to Hilda. He was even severely beaten by Thor. But Freya came to Hyoga's cell and freed him, hoping that Athena and her Saints would help save her sister and Asgard. Hägen refuses to listen and attacks Hyoga with vicious assaults. Hägen remembers being Freya's closest friend during their childhood and one of Hilda's most loyal warriors. Hyoga attacks with the Aurora Thunder Attack, but Hägen attack retaliates with Great Ardent Pressure, a fire technique which easily renders Hyoga's attack useless. Hägen then goes into a cave. Hyoga follows, sensing much heat and encounters a massive river of lava, the only warm place in Asgard. Hägen confronts Hyoga once more, but Since Hyoga was raised in Siberia, he is unable to handle the massive heat. As Hägen attacks Hyoga, Kiki senses the battle and informs Freya who heads off to stop the fighting.
82	"Dancing Cygnus! Scorching Hell in the Ice"; Transliteration: "Mae hakuchō! Hyōchū no shakunetsu jigoku" (Japanese: 舞え白鳥! 氷中の灼熱地獄)	10.1	June 18, 1988
Hyoga is confused as to why Hägen can withstand the heat. Hägen received his God Robe in that place and has trained there since childhood, mastering both ice and fire techniques. As Hyoga tried to see through Hägen's technique, he is continuously overpowered and knocked down, but still manage to stand up and asks for the Odin Sapphire. Both attack each other again, but Hyoga falls unconscious. Just as Hägen is about to throw Hyoga into the lava, Freya arrives and tries to tell him about Hilda and the Nibelung Ring. However, Hägen still believes Freya is being manipulated. Hägen is about to attack, but Freya stands in his way, refusing to move. He reluctantly launches his technique, but Hyoga saves her in time. Hägen and Hyoga attack once again with Great Ardent Pressure and Aurora Execution, but Hyoga awakens the Seventh Sense and overpowers Hägen, killing him. Kiki arrives as Freya mourns Hägen's death, and Hyoga mentions that this is a sorrowful battle they are forced to fight.
83	"Bewitching Harp! The Prelude of Death Beckoning Shun"; Transliteration: "Ayashi no tategoto! Shun o izanau shi no jyokyoku" (Japanese: 妖しの竪琴! 瞬を誘う死の序曲)	9.5	June 25, 1988
After making a grave for Hägen, Hyoga has Kiki take care of Freya and heads for the Valhalla Palace. Hilda, angered that three of her God Warriors have died, is confident she can still win since most of the Bronze Saints are injured. After Seiya falls off a cliff, he remembers how the Gold Saints Aiolia, Milo, Aldebaran, Shaka and Mu gave up a portion of their blood in order to revive their five damage Original Bronze Cloths, which explains their new appearances. The Gold Saints made this sacrifice as a sign of gratitude to the Bronze Saints for rescuing Athena. Seiya climbs back up the cliff and reminds himself to not give up. Meanwhile, Shun remembers the victims at the Battle of the 12 Houses, wondering how long the needless sacrifices will continue. He then encounters the fourth God Warrior, Benetnasch Mime. Shun attacks with his Nebula Chain, but he cannot sense any threat from Mime, which leaves his chain useless to attack with. However, despite not showing any threat, Mime easily breaks through Shun's defenses with an attack at the speed of light. Shun is then questioned by Mime, asking him why he fights, and makes him realize peace will never come, no matter how many opponents he defeats. Suddenly, Ikki speaks to Shun and tells him to believe in their future and never give up. Renewed with vigor, Shun prepares to fight back against Mime.
84	"Death Sentence! Stringer Requiem"; Transliteration: "Shi no senkoku! Sutoringā rekuiemu" (Japanese: 死の宣告! ストリンガー葬送曲)	8.9	July 2, 1988
Shun still struggles against Mime's abilities and illusions. He then removes his Cloth and chains. While talking to Mime, Shun realizes he's not fighting for Hilda and also dislikes fighting. Shun awakens the Seventh Sense and uses the Nebula Stream to immobilize Mime. Finally, he unleashes the Nebula Storm in order to defeat him. Unfortunately, Mime survives thanks to his harp. He then envelopes Shun with the strings on his harp, preparing for his final attack, Stringer Requiem. As Mime plays his music preparing to kill Shun, the chains still cannot sense any hatred. Before Mime's attack kills Shun, Ikki arrives in time to save him. Briefly hearing from Shun that they must defeat the God Warriors and retrieve their Odin Sapphires, Ikki prepares to fight Mime in Shun's stead.
85	"Sorrowful Hero! Frozen Hatred"; Transliteration: "Kanashimi no yūsha! Itetsuita zōo" (Japanese: 哀しみの勇者! 凍てついた憎悪)	8.2	July 9, 1988
Ikki is able to miraculously dodge Mime's lightspeed attack due to his battle against Saga, and also manages to see through his illusion technique. While Ikki is fighting, he senses something in Mime's mind. Ikki tells Mime that he used to hate his destiny and it was because of his friendship with Seiya and the Saints that he found a reason for fighting. Even though Mime gains the upper hand, Ikki cannot sense any hatred within him either. Mime reveals his childhood past. He was trained by his father Folker, a mighty warrior of Asgard, respected by all, who forced him to train. One day, Mime found a locket with a picture of him as a baby and his real parents. Folker reveals that he killed them. When Asgard was at war with a neighboring country, he killed Mime's father and mother, and took Mime to raise him as his own. As Mime mourns his family, Folker mocks him, causing Mime to kill him in one blow. Since then, he has deposited his hatred in his techniques. Ikki uses his Phoenix Illusion, allowing Mime to see his true memories, hidden long ago. When Folker died, he begged forgiveness for what happened. Folker actually let Mime's father go, but he foolishly struck back. Folker counterattacked, but he accidentally killed both him and his mother. After making a grave for them, Folker raised Mime and cared for him. Even though Mime hated him for what happened, he still loved Folker as his father. Now filled with rage, Mime's inner hatred is brought to the surface, ready to destroy Ikki.
86	"Phoenix! The Crimson Blazing Wings"; Transliteration: "Fushichō! Shinku ni moeru tsubasa" (Japanese: 不死鳥! 真紅に燃える翼)	7.7	July 16, 1988
Ikki tells Mime that he hates himself for killing his father and should make up for his crime by saving Asgard from Hilda's wrath. Mime then remembers how Folker trained him, because he knew that he would be chosen as a God Warrior to protect Asgard. As Mime attacks, Ikki is able to counter, but both seem evenly matched. Suddenly, Mime uses his Stringer Requiem and Ikki is trapped while Mime plays his music, preparing to kill him. Shun tries to stop him, but Ikki tells him to pull back, saying he will defeat Mime. Ikki burns his Cosmos to the Seventh Sense and frees himself, destroying his Cloth in the process. He is able to strike Mime and knock him down with his Rising Phoenix, destroying his harp. Ikki tells him that he believes in a future where he and his friends will live in peace and is willing to fight for it. Mime, willing to believe in what Ikki said, removes his God Robe and faces Ikki one last time, to see if what he said is true. Both warriors strike each other, with Mime losing his life, but not before telling Ikki that is he were to be reborn, he would want to be friends with Ikki in a peaceful world. As he dies, Mime apologizes to his father, and entrusts Ikki and Shun with Asgard's future. Shun retrieves the Odin Sapphire and Ikki tells him to keep going, while he falls unconscious, exhausted from the battle. At the Valhalla Palace, as Siegfried and Syd sense Mime's Cosmos disappearing, Megrez Alberich mocks their loyalty to Hilda and swears to destroy the Saints using his intelligence.
87	"Demon's Amethyst! The Cemetery of Saints"; Transliteration: "Ma no murasakisuishō! Seinto no hakaba" (Japanese: 魔の紫水晶! セイントの墓場)	7.0	July 23, 1988
Alberich leaves to defeat the Saints. As the Saints get closer to the Valhalla Palace, Shiryu finally recovers from the fall. Alberich has always hated Hilda for not appreciating his intelligence, and he secretly plans to recover the Odin Sapphires for himself. Just then, a Saint attacks him and tries to escape. The Saint is revealed to be Eagle Marin. Alberich reveals to Marin that they are in the area of his "collection" of victims, skeletal warriors trapped in an amethyst casing. Marin knocks down Alberich, but he cheats by spraying acid in her face. Seiya senses that Marin is in danger and rushes to her aid. Marin attacks with her Eagle Toe Flash twice, but it is useless. Alberich unleashes his technique Amethyst Shield, encasing Marin in an amethyst coffin. Seiya finally finds Alberich and attacks him. As he tries to trick Seiya, Alberich is knocked down again by Seiya's Pegasus Meteor Fist and the Pegasus Rolling Crash. Seiya then sees Marin trapped, and Alberich reveals her lifeforce will be absorbed by the amethyst until she is nothing but bones. Alberich says if he dies, Marin will never be freed, but will save her if Seiya hands over Thor's Odin Sapphire. However, Marin tells Seiya to forget about her and defeat Alberich.
88	"Sword of Flame! Dreadful Ambition"; Transliteration: "Honō no ken! Osorubeki yabō" (Japanese: 炎の剣! 恐るべき野望)	6.4	July 30, 1988
Seiya remembers how Marin was a good influence on him, but he knows he has to save Athena and Asgard, so he decides to defeat Alberich. However, Alberich reveals his Sword of Flame, which came with his Megrez God Robe and tries to slash Seiya with it, while at the same time, tricking Seiya about Marin. Alberich is willing to win no matter what it takes. Although Seiya barely manages to disarm Alberich, he is caught in the Amethyst Shield. Alberich then recover Thor's Odin Sapphire. Hyoga senses Seiya's Cosmo disappearing and rushes to find him. It is revealed that Alberich was there when Hilda was possessed by the Nibelung Ring and chose to keep it quiet. He plans to gather all seven Odin Sapphires, obtain the Balmung sword and kill Hilda in order to rule over Asgard and the world. Hyoga finds Seiya and Marin trapped in the Amethyst Shields. He then tries to convince Alberich to hand over the Odin Sapphires. Since it doesn't work, Hyoga has no choice but to fight. However, Alberich gains the upper hand and is about to slice Hyoga.
89	"Evil Sacrifice! Forest of Spirits"; Transliteration: "Jaaku no ikenie! Seireitachi no mori" (Japanese: 邪悪のいけにえ! 精霊たちの森)	5.8	August 13, 1988
Hyoga saves himself and strikes with all of his techniques, but they seem to be ineffective against Alberich. Meanwhile, Shiryu is able to climb up the ice cavern and return to the battlefield, thanks to his master's advice. Alberich leads Hyoga deeper into the forest where he unveils a secret technique handed down from his ancestors, Nature Unity, where the spirits of the forest come alive and attack the enemy. Shiryu senses Hyoga is in danger and tries to find him. As Hyoga struggles to get up and fight, Alberich uses the Amethyst Shield, but is saved by Shiryu in the nick of time. Exhausted, Hyoga falls unconscious. Alberich reveals that his ancestor had fought Shiryu's master while he was still young. Just then, Roshi remembers that about 200 years ago, he fought against Alberich's ancestor and was able to see through the Nature Unity by becoming one with nature. In the end, Roshi was the victor. Now, since the Amethyst Shield is useless against the Dragon Shield, Shiryu has to face Alberich's Nature Unity, just as his master did long ago.
90	"Don't Look Back, Seiya! Cosmo of the Rising Dragon"; Transliteration: "Furimukuna Seiya! Shoryū no Kosumo" (Japanese: ふり向くな星矢! 昇龍のコスモ)	5.3	August 20, 1988
As Shiryu struggles with the Nature Unity, Roshi speaks to him, telling him to remain motionless and become one with nature. The spirits then release Shiryu. Unfortunately, since Shiryu starts moving again after being provoked by Alberich, the spirits attack him again, so he becomes one with nature again. However, Alberich does whatever he can to distract Shiryu's concentration. Alberich remembers that his family was left with the task of protecting the Odin representative on Earth, but since Hilda uncovered the God Robes, the Odin Sapphires were uncovered as well. He then reveals to Shiryu his plan for world domination. Angry that Alberich is willing to betray his comrades, Shiryu swears to save Hilda, Athena and Asgard. As he struggles against Alberich, Shiryu decides to remove his Cloth and shield in order to counterattack, since he has seen through the Amethyst Shield long ago. Risking his life, Shiryu kills Alberich with his Rising Dragon. Due to Alberich's death, the Amethyst Shields disintegrate, freeing Marin and Seiya. Shiryu and Marin, while trying to recover their strength, have Seiya and Hyoga continue to the Valhalla Palace, with four Odin Sapphires in hand. Before Seiya leaves however, Marin warns him to be careful when facing Syd. With five God Warriors defeated, Mizar Syd volunteers to defeat the Saints, and Shun is the first to arrive at the Valhalla Palace.
91	"Burn Up, Shun! Mystery Hidden in the Dark Fangs"; Transliteration: "Moe yo Shun! Kuroi kiba ni kakusatera nazo" (Japanese: 燃えよ瞬! 黒い牙に隠された謎)	4.8	August 27, 1988
Hilda is very confident is Syd's victory, and while Shun enters the palace, Syd appears before him, remembering their last encounter. Seiya and Hyoga arrive, but just as Seiya challenges Syd again, Shun has him and Hyoga go forward while he fights the God Warrior by himself, promising to catch up later. While both of them run past Syd, a mysterious figure sees them. Shun attacks with his Nebula Chain, but is useless against Syd's cold air. Outside, Shaina arrives and finds Marin. She then tells Shaina about how Aldebaran was defeated. He survived, but revealed to Marin what happened in the battle. Aldebaran and Syd were evenly matched, but he felt a powerful attack from behind, which defeated him. Marin went to Asgard to warn Seiya, but encountered Kiki and Freya. Freya revealed that the Mizar God Warrior has a deadly shadow, because Zeta has twin stars, Mizar and Alcor. She then sends Shaina to find Seiya and warn him about Syd. Shun does his best to strike back, since the Gold Saints revived his Cloth and chains. As Seiya and Hyoga go farther into the palace to find Hilda, someone blocks their past and they are taken down by a strong current of cold air. Shun is taken down after receiving Syd's Viking Tiger Claw, and the same mysterious figure from before is observing the battle.
92	"Swirl! Shun's Ultimate Nebula Storm"; Transliteration: "Uzumake! Shun kyūkyoku no Nebyura Sutoomu" (Japanese: うずまけ! 瞬 究極の星雲嵐)	4.7	September 3, 1988
As Shun gets up, Syd reveals Seiya and Hyoga will die soon due to the cold air in the palace. Shun struggles to defeat Syd in order to rescue his friends, but his chains are ineffective. Syd unleashes his ultimate technique, Blue Impulse, against Shun, tossing him in the air and crashing to the ground. Meanwhile, Shaina is on her way to the Valhalla Palace. As Shun is out cold, Ikki speaks to him, urging him not to abandon his friends or Athena and reminding him of when he unleashed his true power in the Battle of the 12 Houses. Shun also remembers the Gold Saints' sacrifice and removes his Cloth and chains to unleash the Nebula Stream. The stream opens up a hole in the roof, letting all the cold air out. Syd attacks with his Blue Impulse, but Shun awakens his Seventh Sense and counters with the Nebula Storm, killing Syd. However, while Shun attacked, someone tried to attack him, and Shaina took the blow instead. Shun retrieves the Odin Sapphire and Shaina tells him to go. The mysterious man emerges from the shadows, stopping Shun. The man who attacked Shun is revealed to be the God Warrior, Alcor Bud, Syd's shadow. He also revealed that he was the one who defeated Taurus Aldebaran and attacked him from behind. Bud demands Syd and Mime's Odin Sapphires, so Shaina stands up to face him. Siegfried is surprised about Syd's shadow, but Hilda knew this whole time. Shaina is no match for Bud and is quickly defeated. Bud unleashes his Shadow Viking Tiger Claw and almost defeats both Shun and Shaina, but Ikki arrives in time to save them.
93	"Bud! The Fateful Twin Stars"; Transliteration: "Bado! Shukumei no futagosei" (Japanese: バド! 宿命の双子星)	4.7	September 10, 1988
Ikki arrives after his battle with Mime, determined not to abandon his brother. Bud, angered at the fraternal bond between Shun and Ikki, begins to attack, saying that compassion is useless. Ikki miraculously blocks Bud's lightspeed attack before they clash, whereupon Bud's helmet is knocked off, and his face is exactly like Syd's. Bud reveals that Syd is his younger twin brother. Ikki confronts him about not helping his brother, and Bud responds that if Syd dies, he will become the true God Warrior of Zeta, and no longer be a shadow. Ikki attacks, but Bud easily avoids his technique, because he was observing his battle with Mime. Ikki goes down and Bud keeps attacking him, while Shun struggles to help his brother. While fighting, Bud reveals his past that on the day he and Syd were born, his parents had to pick one to keep, because in Asgard, twins were hated. It was believed that twins would destroy a family. Syd and Bud's father reluctantly abandoned the infant Bud in a forest, where a villager found him and raised him, while Syd was lucky enough to stay with his family. Years later, while hunting a bunny, Bud encountered his brother Syd without realizing it, until he noticed that they both had the same family daggers. As Syd left with his family, Bud put it all together and realized who Syd was. Enraged, Bud decided he would be superior to Syd. Later on, he was chosen as a God Warrior, but was still Syd's shadow. Hilda tells Bud that he must stay hidden, but if Syd dies, Bud would become the God Warrior of Zeta. Ikki, feeling sorry for Bud, gets up, and for his brother's sake, swears to win the battle.
94	"Bond of Brotherhood! O Syd, Sleep with Your Ancestors"; Transliteration: "Kyōdai no kizuna! Shido yo sokoku ni nemure" (Japanese: 兄弟の絆! シドよ祖国に眠れ)	5.0	September 17, 1988
It seems Ikki is no match for Bud. Shun and Ikki try to attack together, but are both knocked down by Bud. Ikki then uses his Phoenix Illusion against Bud. In his mind, Bud defeats Syd, but for some reason, he can't give him the death blow. Ikki confronts Bud about trying to help out Syd during his battle with Shun, even though he claimed he wanted Syd dead. Ikki and Bud clash again, with Ikki coming out on top after awakening his Seventh Sense. Suddenly, Syd sneaks up on Ikki and holds him so that Bud can defeat him. Even though Bud is concerned, Syd tells him he's dying anyway so he doesn't need to worry. Ikki asks Syd if he knew about his brother all along. Syd confirms this by saying that he and their parents never stopped caring about him. Syd was also willing for his brother to be a God Warrior. Ikki tells Bud that he will not stop Bud's attack, but something holds him back. Syd dies at that very moment, and Bud realizes what was holding him back, was the love he had for his brother. Ikki explains that even though brothers can sometimes hate or kill one other, they never forget when they cared about each other. Bud leaves, with Syd in his arms, believing in the world Ikki fights for, a world where brothers who are separated, can reunite and live happily. Earlier, Hyoga used all of his power to make a path for Seiya to continue. Seiya gets up and Hyoga tells him to keep going. Shun and Ikki move forward, to fight the last God Warrior. Bud heads out into the blizzard with his brother, hoping they will be reborn in a home with no conflict.
95	"Noble Hero! The Legendary Knight Reborn"; Transliteration: "Kedakaki yūsha! Yomigaeru densetsu no kishi" (Japanese: 気高き勇者! 甦える伝説の騎士)	5.2	October 15, 1988
Kiki tries to stop Freya from going to Saori's side, who is getting weaker by the minute. She realizes that even though Siegfried is the last God Warrior, Siegfried is reincarnated from a warrior with the same name, who became immortal after defeating a dragon and bathing in its blood. Shun and Ikki take Hyoga with them further into the palace. Seiya reaches the Odin statue, but Dubhe Siegfried stands in his way, not willing to show any mercy. Siegfried easily dodges Seiya's attacks and defeats him with his Odin Sword technique. Hyoga, Shun and Ikki arrive while Kiki and Freya watch Saori getting weaker by the minute. Meanwhile, in the forest, Shiryu gets up to join his friends. Ikki faces Siegfried by himself, but is no match for him. Hyoga and Shun are also defeated. Siegfried mourns his friend Hägen and remembers that he must always protect Hilda and Asgard. Seiya gets up, ready to fight the God Warrior again. Siegfried starts to have doubts about why he's fighting due to Seiya telling him about Hilda being possessed. Just then, as Shaina and Shiryu arrive, Siegfried unleashes his most powerful attack, Dragon Bravest Blizzard, and as Shaina goes to protect Seiya, they both take the hit.
96	"Dragon Against Dragon! A Chance of Victory in a 100,000th of a Second"; Transliteration: "Ryū tai ryū! Jyūmanbun no ichiro no shōki" (Japanese: 龍対龍! 十万分の一秒の勝機)	5.3	October 22, 1988
Shiryu faces Siegfried on his own, despite not wearing his Dragon Cloth. No matter what technique Shiryu uses, Siegfried is unscathed, making him wonder if he's really immortal, just like the legend. Back at the caps, Saori can't hold on anymore. Shiryu is struck by the Odin Sword technique and thinks about using the Final Dragon, like he did on Shura. He holds on to Siegfried and prepares the forbidden technique. Just then, Shura's spirit talks to Shiryu and tells him not to do it, otherwise not only will he not protect Athena, the Odin Sapphire would be destroyed as well. Siegfried gets loose and uses the Dragon Bravest Blizzard on Shiryu. He then remembers Roshi's lesson on a double-edge technique, and its weak point, which can not only hurt the opponent, but hurt the one who uses it. Shiryu tells Seiya to watch carefully and he burns his Cosmo to strike Siegfried at his weak point, his heart, just like Shiryu's weak point when Seiya first fought him. Siegfried from the legend also had the same weak point. After killing the dragon, Siegfried became immortal after bathing in its blood. However, a leaf fell on his back, just behind his heart. Later that day, he was hit on that spot by a spear, thrown by someone jealous of him. He died due to his weak point. Shiryu accomplished what he needed to do in order to show Seiya Siegfried's weak point, and faints. Seiya gets up for his friends to fight once more. Hilda waits by her throne, and is visited by someone working for the being who gave her the Nibelung Ring. Seiya has to strike Siegfried's heart at a 100,000th of a second in order to win.
97	"Siren! Beautiful Melody of Death"; Transliteration: "Seirēn! Utsukushiki shi no shirabe" (Japanese: 海魔女! 美しき死の調べ)	5.6	October 29, 1988
Both warriors use their techniques, but Seiya is overpowered and falls to the ground, yet he was able to land several hits on Siegfried's heart. Saori, Shiryu and his friends deposit their Cosmo into Seiya, making Siegfried doubt is Hilda is right, or if Athena is true justice. Hilda suddenly arrives and attempts to finish off Seiya, but Siegfried stops her to confirm his doubts. They attack again, with Seiya's Meteors pushing back Siegfried's Dragon Bravest Blizzard and attacking his heart. Seiya has finally won and goes to retrieve the Sapphire. But a man, playing a flute arrives and introduces himself as a Mariner General serving the God of the Sea Poseidon, Siren Sorrento. He has come from the Sanctuary of the Sea, under Poseidon's orders to take Hilda with him. Sorrento reveals that Poseidon took control of Hilda with the Nibelung Ring, in order to control the world ruled by Athena and kill her. Seiya tries to stop Sorrento, but his music is affecting his mind, leaving him vulnerable for an attack. Siegfried, now realizing the truth and Seiya being right, he hands over the final Odin Sapphire to him. He then goes to fight Sorrento, using the last of his strength. Sorrento plays his flute, with his Dead End Symphony, which is similar to the Siren of Greek Mythology that lures sailors with its music to devour them. Siegfried covers his ears and destroys his eardrums to stop hearing the music, but its useless since it goes directly to the brain. Even though Siegfried is attacked, he still goes to fight Sorrento and holds onto him. Using his last bit of strength, Siegfried takes Sorrento, rising to the sky, sacrificing himself to kill the General. He entrusts Asgard and Hilda to Seiya, who swears his death will not be in vain. With all seven Odin Sapphires in hand, Seiya must now face Hilda in order to save Athena.
98	"Appearance of a Miracle! Odin Robe"; Transliteration: "Kiseki no shutsugen! Ōdīn Rōbu" (Japanese: 奇跡の出現! オーディーンローブ)	5.9	November 5, 1988
With her evil power, Hilda tries to kill Seiya. Shiryu, Hyoga, Shun and Ikki struggle to help their friend. Saori's Cosmos won't last much longer. Seiya fights back, but can't kill Hilda, otherwise Asgard and the world would be lost. Hilda attacks and Seiya falls down a cliff. As Seiya is about to give up, Saga's spirit calls out to him, reminding him of their battle and how he awakened the Seventh Sense to defeat him and save Athena. Saga also reminds Seiya that he will win as long as he has hope, entrusting him with Athena. Seiya climbs back up and heads for Odin's statue. Hilda attacks again, but Hyoga and the others use themselves as shields to protect Seiya. With his friends defeated, Seiya reaches the statue, but doesn't receive a response. Hilda attacks Seiya again, believing she has won. The Odin Sapphires suddenly rise up and place themselves on Odin's crown. Seiya is miraculously saved and the legendary Odin Robe appears, complete with the legendary sword Balmung. The Pegasus Cloth comes off his body to make room for the Odin Robe. Hilda attacks with the Nibelung Ring, but as Seiya is about to deal the death blow, he stops. She is innocent and under Poseidon's control, so he can't kill her. Hilda takes the opportunity to attack and Seiya is down. Odin suddenly speaks to Seiya through his Cosmos and tells him to move forward and protect Asgard. With newfound strength and belief, Seiya strikes Hilda with the Balmung sword.
99	"Athena! Eternal, Noble Prayer"; Transliteration: "Atena yo! Kedakaki eien no inori" (Japanese: アテナよ! 気高き永遠の祈り)	6.4	November 12, 1988
Seiya is victorious and the Nibelung Ring is finally destroyed. The Odin Robe removes itself from Seiya's body, completing its mission. However, Hilda is down, and bleeding. Seiya fears he has killed her, and Saori is down as well, exhausted from using all of her Cosmo. Asgard begins to crumble and the flood seems imminent. As the flood continues, the corpses of the God Warriors (including Bud, who succumbed to his wounds) are shown. Seiya's friends regain consciousness and so does Hilda. She then takes the Balmung sword and prays for everything to be returned to normal, while Seiya, Shaina, Marin and their friends head towards Athena. Freya is able to feel her sister's Cosmos as she prays. Hilda begs forgiveness, as she was able to see how Athena and her Saints suffered and how her God Warriors died while under Poseidon's control and couldn't do anything to stop it. The flooding stops and Saori's Cosmo returns to her, waking up, much to everyone's relief. Hilda comes down to apologize to everyone and reunites with her sister Freya. Saori asks her to be strong and learn from her mistakes in order to protect Asgard. Things seem to be back to normal, but a tidal wave hits everyone. When they wake up, they see Saori is missing. Saori is unconscious, in the arms of Poseidon.

=== Season 6 (1988–89) ===
No.	Title	Rating	Original release date
100	"The Emperor of the Seas, Poseidon! Another Holy War"; Transliteration: "Kaiō Poseidon! Seisen Futatabi" (Japanese: 海皇ポセイドン! 聖戦ふたたび)	6.5	November 19, 1988
There is pouring rain and floods in all parts of the globe. Tatsumi, Jabu and the other Bronze Saints are aware of the panic around the world and wonder what is happening. In Asgard, Seiya and Shun return to Hilda and Freya, with no trace of Saori's whereabouts, but they do believe Poseidon has taken her to the underwater Sanctuary. Saori awakens and encounters Poseidon, but she recognises him as Julian Solo. She first met him during his 16th birthday party. Julian Solo's family is one of the wealthiest sea merchants in the world and he is the heir. When he met Saori, he proposed marriage to her, but she respectfully declined as sorry. Julian was chosen as Poseidon's reincarnation and vessel. Poseidon, thinking that humanity will destroy the planet, tells her that the rain will continue for 30 days, and the water will remain for 150 days, killing all of humanity, but spared Saori, since he is still in love with her. He offer Saori the chance to rule beside him, but once again she rejects him. Saori is willing to sacrifice herself, and hopes her Saints will arrive to crush Poseidon's ambition. Back in Asgard, Hilda and Freya discover ancient texts that reveal a path to Poseidon's Sanctuary. The path is a giant whirlpool, and Seiya and Shun are sucked in. They arrive at the underwater Sanctuary, and there's no water since the water is held up above them. Suddenly, Mermaid Thetis, a Mariner working for Poseidon appears. Seiya and Shun chase after her, trying to see if she knows where Saori is. Thetis tries to trap them using her Coral Trap to encase them in coral, but Seiya destroys it with Pegasus Fist and later Pegasus Meteor Fist. Just then, the Mariner General, Sea Dragon, appears and easily defeats the Saints with one strike.
101	"Smash! Mammoth Pillars of the Seven Seas"; Transliteration: "Uchikudake! Nanatsu no Umi no Manmosu Pirā" (Japanese: 打ち砕け! 七つの海の巨大柱)	6.8	November 26, 1988
Seiya and Shun recover and defeat the Mariners who have arrived. Meanwhile, Poseidon takes Saori to a place where she will give humanity a chance to live, by sacrificing her life. He explains that the underwater Sanctuary has Mammoth Pillars that hold up the seven seas: the North Pacific, South Pacific, North Atlantic, South Atlantic, Indian, Arctic, and Antarctic Oceans. The Mammoth Pillar holding up the sea in its entirety is the Main breadwinner. If it is destroyed, the underwater Sanctuary will be no more. The water that is raining down on the Earth, now falls upon Saori while locked inside the Main Breadwinner, flooding the room inside, drowning her, giving humanity a chance. Also, the seven Mammoth Pillars are being protected by the Mariner Generals, Poseidon's high ranking warriors said to be as powerful as the Gold Saints. Sea Dragon leaves and Thetis tells Seiya and Shun about Saori and the Mammoth Pillars. Saori will die when the room inside the Main Breadwinner is filled with water. The only way to destroy the Main Breadwinner is to destroy the other seven Mammoth Pillars and defeating the seven Mariner Generals. With their mission clear, Seiya and Shun head for the Pacific Oceans. At Lushan, Kiki takes Shiryu back to Asgard to reach Poseidon's Sanctuary. Even though Chunli is sad about Shiryu leaving, Roshi explains that it is his and the Saints' destiny to save the world. After defeating more Mariners, Seiya reaches the North Pacific Mammoth Pillar. He launches a Pegasus Comet Fist to destroy the Pillar, but it's blocked by the Mariner General, Seahorse Baian. Hyoga returns to Asgard and dives into the whirlpool towards Poseidon's Sanctuary. Seiya's Pegasus Meteor Fist is blocked by an invisible wall created by Baian. He is then sent flying by Baian's God Breath.
102	"Mysterious Shine! Golden Bronze Cloths"; Transliteration: "Shinpi no kagayaki! Kiiro no Buronzu Kurosu" (Japanese: 神秘の輝き! 金色の青銅聖衣)	6.7	December 3, 1988
Seiya was attacked twice by Baian's God Breath, and is still able to stand. Baian uses his most powerful attack, Rising Billows, which sends Seiya all the way to the surface of the Pacific Ocean. Shiryu and Kiki arrive in Asgard and dive into the whirlpool. Seiya was able to return to the battlefield, determined to win. As he attacks with his Meteors again, Seiya is able to break through Baian's defensive wall. Shun arrives at the South Pacific Mammoth Pillar and sees a mysterious woman, but she transforms into a demon. It attacks, but Shun is able to defend himself with the Roling Defense. Being taunted by the guardian of the Pillar, Shun is confronted by the Mariner General, Scylla Io. Back at the North Pacific Pillar, Seiya's Pegasus Cloth started to shine like a Gold Cloth for a moment. Seiya explains that it was the Gold Saints' blood, which revived the Original Bronze Cloth, that turned it Golden Bronze Cloth. Grateful for what the Gold Saints gave him, Seiya attacks again. Meanwhile, Thetis stands in Shiryu's way, but Kiki distracts her with his telekinesis while Shiryu leaves, unfortunately he is no match for the mermaid. Baian is confused as to why Seiya's attacks reached him, but Seiya explains that he was able to attack him because Lizard Misty, the first Silver Saint he ever fought, used a similar defensive wall and saw through it. Baian's Seahorse Scales were cracked due to Seiya's Meteors. Baian attacks again, but his techniques are now useless against him. Seiya burns his Cosmo to the Seventh Sense and his Pegasus Cloth turns gold again. With a mighty Pegasus Comet Fist, Seiya finally kills Baian. Shiryu and Hyoga arrive and Seiya explains the situation to them. They then head off to different pillars while Seiya stays behind to destroy the North Pacific Mammoth Pillar.
103	"Watch Out, Shun! Dreadful Fangs of the Demon Beast"; Transliteration: "Ayaushi Shun! Osorubeki majū no kiba" (Japanese: 危うし瞬! 恐るべき魔獣の牙)	6.5	December 10, 1988
With his dying breath, Baian tells Seiya he will never be able to destroy the pillar. Seiya's Pegasus Comet Fist and Pegasus Meteor Fist are useless and fail to even make a scratch. Meanwhile, Kiki is saved by Ophiucius Shaina who brought the Libra Gold Cloth with her, under Roshi's orders. Seiya plans on destroying the pillar using his own body, but Kiki stops him and brings the Gold Cloth to him. Meanwhile, Shaina stayed behind to fight Thetis. The Golden Shield flies to Seiya's hands, and he uses it to finally destroy the North Pacific Mammoth Pillar with a mighty throw. As the pillar is destroyed, the Sanctuary shakes and it appears as though the sea is coming down. The Saints and Thetis sense the pillar is destroyed as well. Hyoga and Shiryu split up to go to different pillars. Seiya tells Kiki to find Shun and give him the Libra Cloth. Meanwhile, back at the South Pacific Ocean, Shun remembers the legend of Scylla, which turns into six horrible beasts (eagle, wolf, queen bee, serpent, bat and bear) and when a ship sailed near its lair, six sailors would meet their doom. Io starts his assault with his first attack, Eagle Clutch and breaks Shun's defense. Then, he uses Wolf's Fang, Queen Bee's Stinger, and Serpent Strangler, which severely injure Shun. Next is Vampire Inhale, making Shun lose much blood. Finally, Io unleashes the strongest attack, Grizzly Slap. However, he didn't attack full force in order for Shun to choose the attack that will kill him. As Io uses Queen's Bee Stinger, Shun counters with his chain turning into a Spider Net, allowing him to destroy the queen bee.
104	"Death of the Demon Beast! Indestructible Golden Chains"; Transliteration: "Majū shisubeshi! Fumetsu no Gōrudo Chēn" (Japanese: 魔獣死すべし! 不滅の黄金鎖)	6.3	December 17, 1988
Io attacks with Eagle Clutch, but Shun counters with a Casting Net and destroys the eagle. Shun doesn't want to fight, but Io continues with Serpent Strangler. Shun finishes it off with Spiral Duct. Poseidon talks to Saori about the night they met. Julian went to Cape Sounion and found Poseidon's Trident. Thetis appeared and told him Poseidon reincarnated in him and took him to Poseidon's Sanctuary to rule. Poseidon's Scales covered Julian and has ruled the oceans since that day, willing to destroy humanity for contaminating the planet the gods bestowed upon them. However, Saori still has faith in her Saints. Io attacks with Vampire Inhale, but Shun counters with Boomerang Shot. Io continues with his Wolf's Fang, so Shun destroys it with Wild Trap. Finally, Io uses Grizzly Slap, but Shun finishes it with Great Capture, breaking the Scylla Scale. Shun now focuses on destroying the South Pacific Mammoth Pillar, but it doesn't work. Io gets free and attacks with his Big Tornado. Shiryu reaches the Indian Ocean Mammoth Pillar and faces Chrysaor Krishna and his Golden Lance. Shun recovers and keeps trying to destroy the pillar, much to Io's shock. As Io prepares to kill Shun, he awakens his Seventh Sense, splits the Big Tornado and captures Io again. This time, however, Shun's Andromeda Cloth turns gold.
105	"Excalibur! In the right arm lies Shura's Soul"; Transliteration: "Ekusukaribā! Migiude ni yadoru Shura no Tamashii" (Japanese: 聖剣! 右腕に宿るシュラの魂)	6.7	December 24, 1988
Shun realizes the Gold Saints' blood caused the miracle, but Io assures the pillar will never be destroyed, not even the Gold Saints can do it. Shun decides to sacrifice his life to try to destroy the pillar. While Seiya and Hyoga try to find the next pillars, Kiki gets to Shun in time and Libra's Twin Rod flies to Shun's hand. Shun destroys the Mammoth Pillar, but Io sacrifices himself to save it, but to no avail. The South Pacific Mammoth Pillar is destroyed. As Io dies, he tells Shun that he must not have compassion for the enemy, or he will lose his life as well. Shiryu continues his battle with Chrysaor Krishna at the Indian Ocean Mammoth Pillar, struggling to dodge the Golden Lance. Shiryu challenges Krishna's Lance with his own Dragon Shield. Unfortunately, the Lance goes through the shield and Shiryu's body. Shiryu keeps the Lance in his body in an attempt to break it, but it doesn't work. When hope seems lost, Capricorn Shura's spirit talks to Shiryu and reveals something when he saved his life. Shura gave power to Shiryu's right arm, allowing him to use the legendary sword, Excalibur. Shiryu gets up and faces Krishna again. Both weapons clash, but the shield stops the lance. Shiryu's shield and Dragon Cloth turn gold and Shiryu tries to use Excalibur, but it doesn't work. Krishna believes Shiryu depends too much on his Cloth, so he removes it, risking his life to awaken Excalibur. Finally, Shiryu corners Krishna and cuts the Golden Lance with Excalibur, along with the Chrysaor Scales. Shiryu asks Krishna to stand down, but he suddenly levitates in the air, unleashing a more powerful Cosmo.
106	"Cruel Dream! Reencounter Reeking of Death"; Transliteration: "Yume muzan! Saikai wa shi no nioi" (Japanese: 夢無残! 再会は死の匂い)	6.9	January 14, 1989
Krishna's Cosmo is keeping Shiryu from reaching the pillar. Not even the Rising Dragon can break through it. Krishna explains that his Cosmo, known as Chakra, is formed by seven vital points. Unless Shiryu destroys those points, the barrier won't be broken. Krishna then uses his Maha Roshini, which leaves Shiryu blind. Shiryu burns his Cosmo to the Seventh Sense and sees the seven vital points. He then uses Excalibur to destroy the points, along with Krishna. Hyoga reaches the Antarctic Ocean Mammoth Pillar, but surprisingly, Aquarius Camus is waiting for him. Hyoga attacks him, knowing full well Camus died in the Battle of the 12 Houses. Camus blocks the attack, trying to prove he is who he is. He then uses Aurora Execution and Hyoga finally believes his grandmaster is alive. Kiki arrives at the Indian Ocean Mammoth Pillar. Meanwhile, Seiya also arrives at the Antarctic Pillar, and Marin is there, telling him to come back with him, which he finds strange, since she doesn't express her emotions. Marin reveals she is Seiya's sister, Seika and removes her mask to reveal the truth. She hugs him and Seiya hugs back, overjoyed to finally find his sister, but a sinister shadow appears. Shiryu uses the Libra Sword to destroy the Indian Ocean Pillar. Shun arrives at the Antarctic Pillar, and finds Seiya and Hyoga defeated, with one blow. Suddenly Ikki appears behind him and attacks him.
107	"Hunter of Hearts! Heartless Lymnades"; Transliteration: "Kokoro no karyūdo! Ryumunadesu mujō" (Japanese: 心の狩人! リュムナデス無情)	7.0	January 21, 1989
Shun counters Ikki and wonders why he's attacking him. Ikki suddenly transforms and reveals his true identity, the Mariner General, Lymnades Caça. His ability is to read his enemies' minds and transform into someone they care about in order to kill them. Camus and Marin were also Caça's disguises and defeated Hyoga and Seiya with one blow after deceiving them. An angry Shun attacks Caça for hurting his friends and deceiving their hearts. Caça is captured by the Nebula Chain, but he then transforms into Ikki again, since he knows Shun won't attack him. His theory is proven correct as Shun stops his chains from attacking. Caça changes back and strikes Shun with his Salamander Shock, but senses a powerful Cosmos heading towards him. Meanwhile, Shiryu tells Kiki to continue with the Libra Cloth. As Caça prepares to finish Shun, the powerful Cosmos strikes him, revealing to come from the real Phoenix Ikki. Caça is struck by the Phoenix Devil Illusion and shows Ikki turning into Caça, and him refusing to fight himself. Taking revenge for his defeated friends and brother, Ikki unleashes multiple attacks on Caça. After blocking the Salamander Shock, Ikki launches his Flying Phoenix and takes out Caça. The General then transforms into Shun, hoping to defeat Ikki. Not falling for the deception, Ikki strikes Caça in the heart, dealing him the death blow. Before dying however, he read Ikki's mind and encounters his memory of Ikki's late lover, Esmeralda. She then kills Ikki, but is happy to be with her forever. However, this is what Caça would have done, if he found out about Esmeralda earlier. Kiki makes it to the Antarctic Pillar. Ikki stops the bleeding from his friends' wounds and uses the Libra Spear to destroy the Antarctic Ocean Mammoth Pillar. Ikki remembers about how strong love can make a person. He then decides to head for Poseidon's Temple, and leaves his friends behind. He also tells Kiki that if they live or die, is up to the strength of their Cosmo.
108	"Isaac! A Cold-Hearted Man"; Transliteration: "Aizakku! Kōri no kokoro wo motsu otoko" (Japanese: アイザック! 氷の心を持つ男)	6.7	February 11, 1989
Hyoga comes to, tells Ikki he was weak because of his emotions and tells him to continue. Hyoga must control his emotions and be strong during battle, like Camus taught him. He then goes to the Arctic Ocean Mammoth Pillar. Ikki heads to Poseidon's Temple, hoping his friends will remain strong and focus on saving Athena. Hyoga arrives at the pillar and senses a familiar cold air. A Mariner General greets him, and he is revealed to be Issac, Hyoga's training partner when he trained with Crystal. Now the Mariner General Kraken Issac, he attacks Hyoga, leaving him confused because Issac used to fight for justice and wonders why he has changed. As children, Issac and Hyoga were close friends and grew strong together as the years went by under Crystal's training. Issac's dream was to become a powerful Saint and fight for justice to protect the Earth. He thought Hyoga's goal was the same. In the present, Hyoga noticed Issac's left eye is nothing but a scar now. Hyoga, sorry for Issac's pain, allows him to destroy one of his eyes as payment. Issac, however, only hurt his eyelid. He then reminds Hyoga of the Kraken legend. The Kraken used to devour ships in one fell swoop, but only attacked people with evil intentions. Issac wanted to have the Kraken's cruelty to defeat evil and fight for peace. One day, Issac found out the real reason why Hyoga wanted to be a Saint, to be able to see his mother in the sunken ship. Angered and disappointed, Issac attacks Hyoga, but at the same time, shows him how to break the ice caps. He also warned Hyoga that if he swims to the bottom, a strong current would trap him, and he would never be seen again. Hyoga finally broke the ice cap, and swims, but is caught in the current. Issac swims down to rescue his friend, who is unconscious. Suddenly, the current traps both of them. Issac's eye was wounded by a stalagtite and tries to break a hole in the ice cap to save Hyoga. He succeeds in saving Hyoga, but Issac is dragged across the ocean, leading him to Poseidon's Sanctuary. Issac found out overtime that Hyoga became the Cygnus Bronze Saint, fought against the Sanctuary and killed his masters, Crystal and Aquarius Camus. That's when Issac decided to become a Mariner General. He then attacks his former friend with his Aurora Borealis.
109	"Hang in There Kiki! A Sorrowful Death Battle"; Transliteration: "Ganbare Kiki! Kanashiki shitō" (Japanese: がんばれ貴鬼! 哀しき死闘)	6.6	February 18, 1989
Shun recovers and tells Kiki to find Hyoga while he goes to the next pillar. Hyoga gets up and tries to tell Issac he's wrong, but Issac insults his former masters, that they weren't strong enough to protect the world. He then attacks Hyoga again, knocking him out. Just then, Kiki arrives, and Issac attacks him to take the Libra Cloth and stop the pillars' destruction. Kiki refuses to let the box go while Issac stomps him mercilessly. Kiki is risking himself, just like his friends are, so he can be a Saint one day. Hyoga gets up and lets Kiki rest until Issac is defeated. Hyoga burns his Cosmos to the Seventh Sense and attacks Issac with Diamond Dust. As Issac recovers, he sees Crystal's and Camus' images behind Hyoga, giving him power. Issac attacks again, but Hyoga blocks it, with the Cygnus Cloth turning gold. He tries to convince Issac again to stop what he's doing. In Athena's Sanctuary, Mu and Aiolia sense what is happening. Aiolia wants to help the Bronze Saints, but Mu stops him because of Roshi's orders to remain in the Sanctuary. Issac prepares one more Aurora Borealis, but Hyoga counters with the Aurora Execution, defeating Issac. He is proud that Hyoga finally set aside his feelings. Hyoga uses the Golden Libra Tonfa to destroy the Arctic Ocean Mammoth Pillar. Before dying, Issac warns Hyoga about the man who started this horrible battle. Meanwhile, Ikki continues toward Poseidon's Temple. However, Sea Dragon suddenly stands in his way.
110	"Listen! The Beautiful Singing of Athena"; Transliteration: "Kike! Utsukushiki Atena no utagoe" (Japanese: 聞け! 美しきアテナの歌声)	6.9	February 25, 1989
Sea Dragon approaches Ikki, but he has sensed this Cosmos before. He then attacks Ikki with a Galaxian Explosion, destroying his helmet. Ikki demands Sea Dragon to reveal who he is. He removes his helmet, and he reveals himself to be Gemini Saga's twin brother, Gemini Kanon, who is pure evil. Kanon sends Ikki to another dimension, using his Golden Triangle, which resembles the Bermuda Triangle. He then claims he will rule both the Earth and the sea. Seiya recovers, sensing Saori's weakened Cosmos. Shaina is still fighting Thetis and is able to defeat her with her Thunder Claw. As she leaves, Thetis warns her about fighting Poseidon, who is now a god. Shaina arrives at the Temple, remembering Juilan Solo is a rich merchant and never had any training. But he exposes a powerful Cosmo, just as strong as Athena's. Shaina attacks, but Poseidon immobilizes and defeats her. Seiya senses Shaina's Cosmos and heads to the Temple. Shiryu recovers and heads for the Temple as well. Kanon claims the Generals dying are according to his plan, but he encounters Sorrento, who has survived the battle against Siegfried in Asgard. As they talk, Sorrento doubts if Poseidon really started this battle and demands to know Kanon's identity and if he revived Poseidon. They then sense a powerful Cosmos and return to their pillars. Shun arrives at the South Atlantic Mammoth Pillar and is shocked to see Sorrento. Back in his battle with Siegfried, Sorrento got loose and escaped his grasp, meaning Siegfried's sacrifice was in vain. Shun is attacked by Sorrento's Dead End Symphony, but is saved when they hear Athena singing from the Main Breadwinner.
111	"Friends! When we Die, It'll be Together"; Transliteration: "Tomo yo! Shi no toki wa issho da" (Japanese: 友よ! 死ぬ時は一緒だ)	7.2	March 11, 1989
Saori's singing is heard throughout the underwater Sanctuary. Seiya arrives at the Temple and sees Shaina unconscious. He then encounters Poseidon and finds out that the Main Breadwinner is almost full of water. Seiya attacks, but his attacks come back to him. Poseidon then destroys the Pegasus Cloth and is about to finish off Seiya, but Shiryu arrives in time to protect him. At the Sanctuary, Milo, Shaka, and Aldebaran gather around Mu and Aiolia, with Milo wanting to help the Bronze Saints. Shiryu attacks Poseidon, but to no avail. Hyoga also arrives, saying if they die, they'll do it together. Poseidon strikes all three Saints, destroying the Dragon and Cygnus Cloths in the process. Saori sings again, still alive and struggling to save the Earth. Seiya gets up again, ready to fight. Mu stops Aiolia from trying to leave again, and as they decide how to act, a Cosmo emerges from the House of Sagittarius and heads towards Poseidon's Sanctuary. Aiolos' spirit sent the Sagittarius Gold Cloth, covering Seiya. Meanwhile, Shun struggles against Sorrento, but can't stop the Dead End Symphony. Suddenly, Shun burns his Cosmo and unleashes the Nebula Stream, stopping Sorrento's movements. Shun pleads Sorrento to surrender, saying that he isn't an evil person, especially since he can play a beautiful melody and possesses a noble spirit. Sorrento is about to play his Dead End Climax, but is defeated by Shun's Seventh Sense-empowered Nebula Storm.
112	"Two Souls! The Mystery of Poseidon's Resurrection"; Transliteration: "Futatsu no tamashii! Poseidon fukkatsu no nazo" (Japanese: ふたつの魂! 海皇復活の謎)	7.0	March 18, 1989
Kiki arrives to the South Atlantic pillar and hands Shun a weapon to destroy the pillar. Sagittarius Seiya attacks again, but Poseidon sends his attacks back to him. Meanwhile, at the North Atlantic Mammoth Pillar, Ikki comes back and confronts Kanon, saying that Saga was stronger than his brother. After blocking the Galaxian Explosion, Ikki uses the Phoenix Illusion on Kanon and having him reveal his secret. Thirteen years ago, Kanon tried to convince his brother, Saga, to kill Athena, who was a baby at the time, and to kill the Pope who chose Aiolos as his successor. Saga then locked his brother in the prison at Cape Sounion, where Athena locked her enemies from ancient wars, until his evil heart would be purified. Kanon then assures Saga that his heart is just as evil, and at that moment, the evil inside Saga awakens (which would begin Saga's reign of terror in the Sanctuary Chapter). Saga leaves his brother, with Kanon swearing to kill his brother and Athena. During his time in the prison, Kanon almost died many times, but a gentle Cosmo saved his life every time. One day, Kanon found Poseidon's Trident sealed by Athena, in the prison. When he removed the seal, Kanon was dragged to Poseidon's Sanctuary. When he entered the temple, he accidentally freed Poseidon's soul and using the name Sea Dragon, informed him of Athena reincarnating on Earth. Poseidon told Kanon that whenever he revives, he takes over the body of a member of the Solo family. In this case, the member in the Solo family is three-year-old Julian. Since Athena can't do anything as a baby, Poseidon slept in Julian's body and told Kanon to wake him up in thirteen years, when the Mariners have gathered. As Poseidon left, Kanon wore the Sea Dragon Scales, swearing to manipulate Julian and the Mariner Generals, rule both the Earth and the sea, also to keep Poseidon asleep forever. Now that Ikki knows the truth, Kanon prepares to finish him off. Meanwhile, at Poseidon's temple, Seiya gets up again and prepares to fire a Sagittarius Golden Arrow at the God of the Sea.
113	"Shoot Poseidon! The Golden Arrow"; Transliteration: "Poseidon wo ute! Ōgon no ishi" (Japanese: 海皇を射て! 黄金の一矢)	7.4	March 25, 1989
Seiya fires the arrow, but Poseidon controls it, firing it at Seiya's heart. Miraculously, he survives, thanks to the Gold Cloth. Seiya fires again, and Poseidon controls the arrow, but Shaina protects Seiya, and the arrow hits her back. She tells Seiya that she loves him and that he is their last hope and that he must not die. At the Sanctuary, a beam of light shoots from the House of Aquarius, heading for Poseidon's temple. Shaina extracts the arrow from her back and hands it to Seiya, saying she will protect him, no matter what, and to fire as many times as necessary. Poseidon controls the arrow again, but Seiya shields Shaina instead. Shiryu instead takes the hit, protecting them both. Hyoga gets up, and both him and Shiryu decide to be Seiya's shields. Shun arrives as well, telling him to keep firing. Only this time, Shiryu and the others will deposit their Cosmo in the arrow. Seiya fires the arrow one last time, hoping it doesn't return this time. Unable to control the arrow, Poseidon is struck by it, knocking his crown off his head, and not only does he start bleeding, but his powerful Cosmo disappears. Seiya and his friends run past him, heading for the Main Breadwinner. Unfortunately, Poseidon fully awakens, unleashing a powerful Cosmos. Back at the North Atlantic Mammoth Pillar, Ikki and Kanon sense Poseidon waking up. Sorrento and Kiki arrive, handing Ikki the Golden Libra Shield, much to Kanon's surprise. Sorrento, knowing Kanon started the battle, lets Ikki destroy the final pillar. Meanwhile, Poseidon fully awakens from his slumber before he attacks Seiya and his friends. Hyoga gets up to protect Seiya, and then, Camus' spirit sends Hyoga the Aquarius Gold Cloth to cover him. He then uses Aurora Execution to try to stop Poseidon's attack. Just as the attack is about to fail, Shiryu blocks it with the Libra Shield and wears the Libra Cloth. Now, Sagittarius Seiya, Aquarius Hyoga and Libra Shiryu, clad in Gold Cloths, are ready for a final showdown with Poseidon.
114	"Shine, Stars of Friendship! The Eternal Legend of the Young Men"; Transliteration: "Kagayake yūjō no hoshi yo! Eien no shōnen densetsu" (Japanese: 輝け友情の星よ! 永遠の少年伝説)	7.9	April 1, 1989
Seiya, Hyoga and Shiryu combine their techniques and Cosmo, knocking down Poseidon. Shiryu tries to destroy the Main Breadwinner with the Golden Shield, but it flies back to him, with the pillar unscathed. Meanwhile, Ikki is mercilessly attacked by Kanon, angry that his ambitions are crushed. Sorrento tries to kill Kanon with his melody, but Ikki asks to talk to Kanon, about the one thing used to seal Poseidon's soul: Athena's urn. Seiya and his friends are unable to destroy the pillar with Libra's weapons. Seiya asks his friends to launch his body with their techniques in order to destroy the pillar that way. Shun gets up, preparing to fight. Ikki reveals to Kanon that the Cosmo that saved his life many times in Cape Sounion, belonged to Athena. Finding it hard to believe, since Athena was a baby at the time, Kanon reveals the location of Athena's urn, inside the Main Breadwinner. Ikki leaves for the temple, saying Kanon is not worth fighting. Sorrento, sensing Athena's compassion for humanity, takes his leave, also saying Kanon isn't worth the effort. Poseidon awakens again, but Ikki holds him long enough for Seiya to destroy the pillar and recover Athena's urn. Shiryu and Hyoga launch their Rising Dragon and Aurora Thunder Attack, sending Seiya flying towards the pillar. Poseidon gets rid of Ikki and attacks him, Shun, Shiryu and Hyoga. The four Saints burn their Cosmos, covering Seiya and he is able to make a miracle occur. The Main Breadwinner falls apart and it is finally destroyed. Seiya emerges from the rubble, with Saori in his arms. The ocean comes down hard on Poseidon's Sanctuary, starting to flood it. Saori awakens, with her urn, telling Poseidon to surrender. Poseidon throws his trident to her, but Seiya protects her. Poseidon launches multiple attacks at Saori, but her love for her Saints and humanity cause Seiya and his friends to burn their Cosmos, protecting her and surpassing Poseidon's strength. Then, the God of the Sea's soul is dragged to the urn and sealed once again. With Poseidon's Cosmo extinguished, Athena and her Saints have won the battle. Kiki and Shaina reunite with their friends. Saori then teleports them back to the surface. The floods and rains have seized. Tatsumi, Jabu, Ban, Ichi, Nachi, Geki, Hilda, Freya, Aiolia, Milo, Shaka, Aldebaran, Mu, Marin, Chunli, and Roshi look up at the sun filled sky, happy that the world is saved. Julian lies unconscious on the surface with Thetis, now a real mermaid, swimming away. Seiya, Shiryu, Hyoga, Shun, Ikki, Kiki and Shaina are gathered with Saori. She swears that when evil threatens the Earth and no matter what difficulties they face, she and her Saints will continue to protect and love the world they live in.

== The Hades Chapter ==
The first thirteen episodes of the OVA series corresponding to the "Hades saga" of the manga were broadcast on Animax (a Japanese pay-per-view channel) from November 2002 to April 2003, and then released on DVD during the year 2003. These thirteen episodes, named Hades: Chapter Sanctuary (冥王ハーデス十二宮編, Meiō Hādesu Jyūnikyū Hen), were directed by Shigeyasu Yamauchi, still with character designs by Shingo Araki and Michi Himeno, while the scripts were adapted from the manga by Michiko Yokote. The soundtrack was entirely taken from Yokoyama's work on the previous TV series.

Two years after the first chapter of the "Hades saga", a second chapter was produced in 2005, continuing the adaptation of the manga into anime. This second chapter was named Hades: Chapter Inferno Part 1 (冥王ハーデス冥界編 前章, Meiō Hādesu Meikai Hen Zenshō) and consisted of six episodes. Toei Animation released the first two OVAs on the same Animax channel, on December 17, 2005, followed by the next two on January 21, 2006. The last pair were released on February 18, 2006. Shortly after their TV broadcasting, the episodes were released on DVD in 2006. This chapter was directed by Tomoharu Katsumata, again with character designs by Shingo Araki and Michi Himeno. The scripts were done by Yosuke Kuroda and the soundtrack, by Yokoyama, included tracks from the TV series of 1986 and two new tracks.

Several of the original voice actors reprised their roles in the Sanctuary chapter, but starting with the Inferno chapter, many of them were replaced by new voice actors. For example, Masakazu Morita replaced Toru Furuya as the voice of Pegasus Seiya, Yūta Kasuya replaced Ryo Horikawa as the voice of Andromeda Shun, Hiroaki Miura replaced Koichi Hashimoto as the voice of Cygnus Hyōga, Katsuyuki Konishi replaced Hideyuki Hori as Phoenix Ikki, Takahiro Sakurai replaced Hirotaka Suzuoki as the voice of Dragon Shiryū and Fumiko Orikasa replaced Keiko Han as the voice of Saori Kido/Athena. Hideyuki Tanaka, however, reprised his role as the narrator.

On July 4, 2006, the newly published fifteenth volume of the Saint Seiya Japan Complete Version manga brought the news that production of Hades: Chapter Inferno Part 2 (冥王ハーデス冥界編 後章, Meiō Hādesu Meikai Hen Kōshō) had begun. Toei Animation officially announced the news on its website on July 18, 2006. Hades: Chapter Inferno Part 2, which consisted of six episodes, was released on Japan's SKY PerfecTV!. The first two episodes were available from December 15, 2006, to January 4, 2007; the third and fourth episodes from January 19, 2007, to February 1, 2007; and the last two from February 16, 2007, to March 1, 2007.

The final chapter of the OVA series, Hades: Chapter Elysion (冥王ハーデス エリシオン編, Meiō Hādesu Erishion Hen), was released on March 7 (episodes 26 and 27), May 2 (28 and 29), and August 1, 2008 (30 and 31).

=== Chapter 1: Sanctuary (2002–03) ===
No. overall	No. in season	Title	Original release date
115	1	"The Start of a New Holy War"; Transliteration: "Aratanaru Seisen no hajimari" (Japanese: 新たなる聖戦のはじまり)	November 9, 2002
It has been 243 years since the previous Holy War between Athena and Hades, God of the Underworld. On a tower that Roshi has been observing, the seal Athena placed ages ago has lost its effect. The spirits of the 108 Specters, Hades' soldiers, are now free. At the Sanctuary, Nachi, Ichi and Shaina notice that graves from the Saints' graveryard have been disturbed, with the bodies coming out from the inside. At the House of Aries, a shadowy figure approaches Mu, who seems familiar to him. He orders Mu to bring him Athena's head in 12 hours. When he refuses, two more figures appear. Two Gold Saints who died in the Battle of the 12 Houses, Cancer Deathmask and Pisces Aphrodite. Since they sold their souls to Hades, he offered them new lives, bodies, and Surplices, armors from the Underworld, resembling their Gold Cloths. Now Hades' Specters, they attack, but Mu is able to block and reflect their techniques with his Crystal Wall. The figure destroys the Crystal Wall and has Deathmask and Aphrodite go and kill Athena. Mu blocks their path and is struck by Deathmask. Suddenly, Seiya comes to Mu's rescue, but is shocked to see the dead Gold Saints alive again. Mu explains that Hades is Athena's true enemy and wants to destroy her to rule the Earth. The true reason the Gold Saints revived in this era, is in order to defeat Hades and his army. Mu also tells him that under Saori's orders, Seiya and his friends are no longer welcome in the Sanctuary, and are to be killed if they disobey. In disbelief, Seiya wears his Pegasus Cloth, even though it's damaged, and battles Deathmask, easily overpowering him with his Pegasus Meteor Fist. However, Mu strikes Seiya from the back, and as Deathmask moves in for the kill, Mu tosses him aside and seemingly destroys Seiya with his Starlight Extinction.
116	2	"The Three Sorrowful Ones"; Transliteration: "Dōkoku no sannin" (Japanese: 慟哭の三人)	November 9, 2002
The shadowy figure deduce that Mu teleported Seiya instead of destroying him. Mu blocks Deathmask and Aphrodite's paths once more and defeats them with Starlight Extinction. At Lushan's Waterfalls, Roshi tells Chunli he is leaving and might never come back, telling her to not let Shiryu leave her side and wishing Seiya and the others would live peacefully as normal teenagers after fighting for so long. As Roshi leaves, three shadowy figures approach Chunli. Deathmask and Aphrodite have been vanquished, but three more figures approach Mu. Shaina orders Nachi and Ichi to set fire to the remaining graves, while Jabu discovers that three more Gold Saints were revived. At Lushan, the figures ask Chunli for the whereabouts of Shiryu and Roshi, but Shiryu, still blind, comes to her rescue. The figures reveal themselves as the former Silver Saints Perseus Argol, Auriga Capella, and Cerberus Dante, who were revived thanks to Hades' power. After receiving the Silver Saints' attacks, Shiryu easily kills them with his Rising Dragon. The figures surrounding Mu reveal themselves as the Gold Saints Capricorn Shura, Hyoga's grandmaster Aquarius Camus, and Gemini Saga, also revived by Hades and after Athena's head. Even though he received Camus and Shura's attacks, Mu stands strong. But all three Specters attack Mu at once. However, he is able to sense that their souls are crying tears of blood. The first figure immobilizes Mu so Saga, Shura and Camus can go through the House of Aries to get Athena's head. Chunli was unable to stop Shiryu and he heads for the Sanctuary. Roshi arrives and ignites the flames on the fire clock. He has the figure reveal himself, the previous Pope killed by Saga and Mu's master, Aries Shion. Roshi, whose real name is Dohko, is surprised to see his friend and fellow survivor of the previous Holy War, with his 18-year-old body, when he is supposed to be 261 years old, like him. Roshi frees Mu from Shion's telekinesis and tells him to join Aiolia and the other Gold Saints to save Athena while he fights his old friend.
117	3	"Squirming Shadows"; Transliteration: "Ugomekumono no kage" (Japanese: 蠢く者の影)	December 26, 2002
At Hades' castle, Wyvern Rhadamanthys, one of the three judges of the Underworld, begs Pandora, a beautiful girl and Hades' representative, to give him permission to go to the Sanctuary, but she refuses, and says the revived Gold Saints will handle the mission of killing Athena. Mu heads for the House of Taurus to find Aldebaran. Shun awakens after he keeps having dreams of a girl who resembles Pandora. Sensing something is wrong, he heads towards the Sanctuary. Tatsumi, under Saori's orders too, tries to keep Shun from leaving, but to no avail. Mu finds Aldebaran, but the Taurus Saint has died, and only his Gold Cloth and a small trace of his Cosmos remain. The one responsible emerges from the shadows, a Specter, Deep Niobe, who was sent by Rhadamanthys. Deathmask and Aphrodite invade Hades' Castle, hoping to see the god, but Rhadamanthys sends them to the Land of Death. Rhadamanthys appears before them and tosses them into Yomutsu Hirasaka. Niobe uses his Deep Fragrance, which killed Aldebaran, against Mu, but the Crystal Wall blocked it. Mu claims that Niobe has already died, due to Aldebaran's Great horn, only it was delayed. As Mu leaves, Niobe's body is crushed. Aldebaran's Cosmos was able to save Mu, and he claims his death was not in vain. Shun heads for a ship that will take him to Greece, but is attacked by Canis Major Sirius, Heracles Alghetti, and Musca Dio, who have revived. Shun, with his Damaged Andromeda Cloth, kills all three Silver Saints with his Nebula Chain. Mu heads for the House of Gemini, but is surprised to sense two powerful Cosmos coming from it. Saga tells Camus and Shura to keep going, while he fights the new guardian of the House.
118	4	"Expiation of the Demigod"; Transliteration: "Hanshin no shokuzai" (Japanese: 半神の贖罪)	December 26, 2002
Scorpio Milo arrives at Athena's Temple, sensing an enemy, but Saori assures him that the person is an ally, and is protecting the House of Gemini. Saga recognises the new guardian, remembering all of his atrocities, his twin brother Kanon, who survived the battle of Poseidon and now wearing the Gemini Gold Cloth. In Siberia, Hyoga decides to never see his mother again, even though he will never forget her. He remembers Camus' teachings and the influence he had on his life. Suddenly, three figures approach him. Kanon says that Athena has cleansed the evil in his heart and has forgiven him. He also says that he will fight for justice from now on. Even though Shura and Camus went ahead, they are caught in the Gemini Labyrinth. Saga attacks, but the Gemini Cloth is empty. He then fires a huge blast of energy, all the way to the Pope's chambers, striking the real Kanon. Milo appears, and believing Kanon is still a threat, orders him to leave, acknowledging the remaining Saints will never forgive him for all he's done. Kanon refuses, saying he fights for Athena. Milo retaliates with his Scarlet Needles, one after another. Meanwhile in Siberia, the Silver Saints Lizard Misty, Whale Moses and Centaurus Babel, revived by Hades, fight Hyoga and are quickly defeated by his Aurora Thunder Attack, with Babel asking him to save Athena. Kanon refuses to fight, and is willing to receive all of the Scarlet Needles, since Saori has forgiven him. Saori asks Milo to stop what he's doing, but he won't because of the evil Kanon has done. Kanon received 14 Scarlet Needles and begins to bleed profusely. Milo uses Antares, the final needle. Milo takes his leave to the House of Scorpio, but before leaving, he admits that Kanon is now their ally, and instead of using Antares, he stopped the bleeding. The Scarlet Needles were a test to see if Kanon was telling the truth. With the illusions gone, Shura, Camus and Saga emerge from the House of Gemini. Saga, with tears of joy, hoping that his brother really became a guardian of justice, heads with his friends to the House of Cancer.
119	5	"Transient Reencounter"; Transliteration: "Karisome no saikai" (Japanese: かりそめの再会)	January 11, 2003
As they approach the House of Cancer, Saga, Shura and Camus can sense the presence of death, and end up in the Land of Death. Suddenly, zombies start attacking them. Shiryu finally arrives at the Sanctuary, but is attacked by someone. Saga defeats the zombies and stops the illusion with his Galaxian Explosion. Shura senses someone following them, but Saga said they will take care of them later. At the same time, Ikki, with his no damaged Phoenix Cloth, appears before Shiryu, telling him to leave as they aren't allowed here, and that he's only here to observe the battle. Angered, Shiryu attacks Ikki, saying he's fighting for Athena and his friends. Ikki then points Shiryu to Seiya's direction before leaving. Shion and Dohko talk, revealing that they were the only survivors of the previous Holy War. Shiryu finds Seiya, alive, at the colisseum, due to Mu's teleportation. Even though Seiya is angry at Ikki for not joining them now, Shiryu reminds Seiya that he is their friend and comrade, and that he may be needed in this battle. Both friends head to the 12 Houses, reminiscing about the past when they last ran up those stairs to save Athena. Meanwhile, Saga and his friends are still trying to break through the House of Cancer, sensing a powerful Cosmos, belonging to Virgo Shaka, who was using an illusion to distract them for 12 hours. Saga realizes he must kill Shaka to stop the illusion and fires a powerful blast to the House of Virgo. However, Shaka protected himself with a barrier, and counters with a blast of energy, just as powerful to the House of Cancer. Shion tries to leave, sensing the attacks, but Dohko stops him, ready to settle the score.
120	6	"The Warrior from Ancient Times"; Transliteration: "Inishie no tōshi" (Japanese: 古の闘士)	January 11, 2003
Shion and Dohko's power clashes, but it seems Shion has the upper hand, due to Dohko's current appearance. Feeling this, Shiryu tells Seiya to go ahead while he goes to help his master. Dohko orders Shiryu to leave and attacks Shion with the One Hundred Dragons. Hyoga and Shun arrive at the Sanctuary, but Shaina stands in their way. Dohko's dragons are no match for Shion who counters with his ultimate attack, Stardust Revolution. Shiryu wears his Damaged Dragon Cloth and attacks Shion. Shun understands why Saori gave the order, but he realizes they must protect her no matter what. Shaina prepares to battle Hyoga once he starts burning his Cosmo. At the House of Aries, Shion blocks the Rising Dragon, but Dohko gets up and asks Shiryu to leave. However, Shiryu can't leave, knowing his master is fighting alone. Dohko agrees to let him stay, promising to apologize to Athena later. Hyoga prepares to attack, but Shaina turns her back and allows them to move forward. Shion attacks, but the Libra Gold Cloth saves Dohko and Shiryu. Suddenly, Dohko burns his Cosmos, and reveals something amazing. His body starts to crack like a shell, and a younger body emerges from the old one. The young Libra Dohko has returned. He reveals that Athena gave him the gift of Misopethamenos, which allowed him to stay young, meaning, since 243 years passed, for Dohko, it was only 243 days. Dohko tells Shiryu to follow Mu and defeat the Specters that came to the Sanctuary. Dohko dons his Cloth after 243 years and prepares for battle. Shion and Dohko clash with their ultimate techniques, Stardust Revolution and the One Hundred Dragons. Shiryu is sent flying due to the impact. Seiya, Mu, Hyoga, Shun and Shiryu sense both Shion and Dohko's Cosmos have disappeared.
121	7	"The Herd of Black Cloaks"; Transliteration: "Kuroki koromo no mure" (Japanese: 黒き衣の群れ)	February 8, 2003
Mu arrives at the House of Cancer, destroyed by Shaka's attack. He is then bound by psychokinesis, and a group of Specters make themselves known, searching for Saga, Camus and Shura. Cyclops Giganto tries to attack Mu, but Seiya arrives in time to save him, asking Mu to let him and his friends participate in the battle. Giganto avoids his Meteors and strikes multiple blows. Then, a strange, slimy creature, who used the psychokinesis, named Papillon Mew tells Giganto and the other Specters to head for the House of Leo. Shiryu encounters Hyoga and Shun, wanting to know where his master is, but there was no trace left, so they continue on their way. Mu is freed from the psychokinesis, because Mew wants to fight him. Mew attacks with Ugly Eruption, but Mu counters with Crystal Wall and Stardust Revolution. Mew then turns into a huge insect and uses Silky Thread to bind Mu and Seiya. Shiryu, Hyoga and Shun pass the House of Cancer, not realizing their friends were trapped close by. Mu and Seiya emerged from the cocoons and find another one above them, with Mew inside. He then emerges in his ultimate form and attacks Seiya with his psychokinesis, but the voice of his friends allow him to break free, much to Mew's shock as not even Mu could do that. Mu then tells him to go to the House of Leo, while he fights Mew. Mu dodges Mew's Fairy Thronging and traps the fairies and him with Crystal Net. Mew is then killed by the Starlight Extinction. After defeating his opponent, Mu heads for the House of Leo.
122	8	"The Moment of Vacillation"; Transliteration: "Shunjun no toki" (Japanese: 逡巡の刻)	February 8, 2003
Seiya meets up with his friends and they head to the House of Leo. Meanwhile, Giganto and his group of Specters encounter Aiolia at the House of Leo, still searching for Saga and the others, since they were suspicious of them. Five Specters try to get through the House, but Aiolia quickly eliminates them with his Lightning Plasma. Another Specter, Worm Raimi, appears. Seiya and his friends encounter three dead Specters, without their Surplices. One was frozen to death, one was slashed in the back, and the last one had major burn marks. They continue towards the House of Leo. Raimi tells the other Specters to go to the next House and digs a hole underground. Aiolia senses familiar Cosmos within the Specters. Suddenly, he is bound by Raimi's tentacles, but frees himself and drags Raimi above ground. Aiolia attacks but the Specter goes underground and reemerges. However, Aiolia finishes him off with a Lightning Bolt. The four Bronze Saints arrive and tell Aiolia about the dead Specters. Giganto and the other Specters arrive at the House of Virgo and find it in shambles. Shaka appears before them and blocks their attacks with his barrier. He then pulls out a rosary with 108 beads, the same number as Hades' Specters. When a bead turns black, it means a Specter has died. So far, 11 Specters have died, but Giganto is confused, there should only be 8 dead. Shaka attacks the Specters, but three of them stop the attack and use Diamond Dust, Excalibur and Galaxian Explosion. Shaka barely blocks the techniques. Knowing who the three Specters are, Shaka removes the Surplices to reveal Saga, Camus and Shura. Aiolia tells Seiya and the other Saints that Shaka is willing to sacrifice himself.
123	9	"At the End of Pride"; Transliteration: "Kyōji no hate" (Japanese: 矜持の果て)	March 8, 2003
Shaka questions Saga about his true intentions, and they tell him that they are going to kill Athena, so he lets the three of them go to the next House. Shaka then kills the remaining Specters, even though they believe Hades will grant them eternal life, but Shaka proves them wrong. He then stops Saga and the others to try to get the real truth out of them, now that they aren't being followed. However, they still plan on killing Athena. Shaka leads the three former Saints to a garden known as the Twin Sala, also known as Buddha's final resting place. Shaka fights all three of his former friends at once and seems to have the upper hand, but can't keep up for long. He then uses his most powerful technique, Heaven's Treasure to eliminate his enemies' five senses. Unless of course, they use a technique forbidden by Athena since ancient times, the Athena Exclamation. The technique can be used by three Gold Saints, and has the same power as the Big Bang that created the Universe. As they lose their senses, Saga and the others ponder about using the technique, facing eternal shame. Saga convinces them otherwise and reminds them why they allied themselves with Hades. Seiya, Aiolia and the other Saints arrive at the House of Virgo, but Mu blocks the door of the Twin Sala, telling them Shaka wants to die. Shaka is about to eliminate the final senses, but Saga, Shura and Camus use the Athena Exclamation to kill him. While receiving the technique, Shaka remembers Buddha's teachings, while Athena and the other Saints sense and mourn his death.
124	10	"The Golden Clash"; Transliteration: "Konjiki no gekitotsu" (Japanese: 金色の激突)	March 8, 2003
Saga, Shura and Camus only have one of their senses each, but Shaka has survived somehow. He sits under the Twin Gala and writes a message with his blood on flower petals, then the wind blows them towards Athena. Saga and the others realized that Shaka's spirit had come back, just to write his message. After mourning Shaka's death, Saga and the others encounter the Saints, but Aiolia attacks all three, wanting to avenge Shaka. However, Saga blocks his Lightning Plasma. With only four hours left, the former Saints are willing to see Athena no matter what. Meanwhile, Saori receives the flower petals with Shaka's message. The message read Arayashiki, and Saori understands the meaning behind Shaka's death. Milo arrives at the House of Virgo, attacking Saga and the others, but Saga counters with Galaxian Explosion. Saga, Camus and Shura get into position for the Athena Exclamation. Mu, Milo and Aiolia also get into position to use the same technique, despite the protests of Seiya and his friends. If two Athena Exclamations clash, their destructive power will increase to infinity, destroying the entire Sanctuary. As the Gold Saints entrust the Bronze Saints with Athena, the Athena Exclamations are unleashed at the same time.
125	11	"Shaking Sanctuary"; Transliteration: "Shinkan no Sankuchuari" (Japanese: 震撼の聖域)	April 12, 2003
The clash of the forbidden techniques is felt throughout the entire Sanctuary and are evenly matched, increasing their destructive force. Suddenly, Seiya, Shiryu, Hyoga and Shun burn their Cosmos to push back the techniques towards Saga and his group. Then they surround the exclamations in order to stop them. The four Bronze Saints awaken their Seventh Sense, their Damaged Cloths turn Golden Bronze Cloths, and they unleash their techniques, forcing the exclamations into the sky where they explode. However, Seiya and his friends are caught in the disaster as the House of Virgo crumbles from the impact. At her Temple, Saori has Kanon retrieve something from the Pope's chambers, left by Saga 13 years ago. Mu, Aiolia and Milo emerge from the rubble, wondering where the Bronze Saints are. Saga, Camus and Shura also emerge from the wreckage. Saori has the Gold Saints bring Saga and his group to her Temple. Seiya and his friends awaken, having survived the commotion. They head for Athena's Temple as well. Once Saga and the others arrive, Kanon hands him a chest, with a golden dagger inside. Thirteen years ago, Saga, disguised as the Pope, tried to kill Athena with the same dagger as a baby. Saori tells Saga to kill her with the dagger, to free them from their suffering. Seiya and his friends arrive, but are too late as Saori kills herself. Back at Hades' Castle, Wyvern Rhadamanthys is informed about Athena's death, and is punished by Pandora for sending Specters to their deaths. Seiya and his friends mourn Saori's death, but Shion arrives, saying the real battle will soon begin. The four Saints attack at the same time, but Shion tosses them aside and is about to explain the whole truth, and the reason behind Athena's and Shaka's deaths.
126	12	"The Cloth of Athena"; Transliteration: "Atena no Kurosu" (Japanese: 女神の聖衣)	April 12, 2003
Shion reveals that the Gold and Silver Saints revived by Hades never betrayed Athena and would never hurt her. He also shows the Bronze Saints the reason why they went through all this trouble. He uses Saori's blood and it flies towards Athena's statue. It begins to glow and then shrinks down to a tiny version of itself. Shion explains that the statue is really the Athena Cloth, which needs her blood to awaken. Shion was the only one who knew the secret. If Saori plans to win against Hades, she needs her Cloth. In the Underworld, Hades came to Shion and the other Saints, revived them and offered them a deal: if they killed Athena in 12 hours, they would be granted eternal life. They pretended to accept the deal, to enter the Sanctuary and get her blood for her Cloth, so Athena would defeat Hades. Shion gives the Bronze Saints the following order: go to Hades' Castle and destroy him. At Hades' Castle, Saga and his group take Saori's body covered in a sheet to Pandora, but the sheet is revealed to be empty, and they are there to find Hades and kill him. Shion's 12 hours are almost up and will return to the Underworld soon. He gives the Saints Athena's blood to revive their heavily damaged Bronze Cloths. Now, with their Final Bronze Cloths, Shion entrusts Seiya and his friends with Athena's Cloth to make sure Saori receives it. Aiolia, Mu and Milo arrive at Hades' Castle and face Rhadamanthys, but for some reason, they can't defeat him, and the Specter picks them apart, with no effort at all. Shura is about to cut Pandora, Camus freezes a Specter, Frog Zeros, and Saga asks Pandora to take them to Hades. But they are weakened, because their 12 hours are almost up. Pandora demands to know where Athena is, and Saga tells her that she is in the Underworld. Pandora realizes that Saori plans to fight Hades. Rhadamanthys is about to toss Aiolia into the Underworld, but Shun's chain rescues him. The four Bronze Saints have finally arrived.
127	13	"The Morning of Determination"; Transliteration: "Ketsui no asa" (Japanese: 決意の朝)	April 12, 2003
Aiolia, Mu and Milo sacrifice themselves, stalling Rhadamanthys, allowing the Bronze Saints to find the room where Saga and his group is. The Gold Saints are tossed into the Underworld, presumably losing their lives. Saga and the others' 12 hours are up and the Bronze Saints mourn their deaths after receiving some timely advice before disappearing. Hyoga kills Zeros, because he was stomping Camus, with the Aurora Execution. Just as they spot Pandora, who is going to the Underworld, and try to go after her, Rhadamanthys appears and gains the upper hand on the Bronze Saints. Seiya gets up again, struggling to attack Rhadamanthys. As the Specter is about to toss Seiya down to the Underworld, Shiryu, Hyoga and Shun attack at the same time, but he knocks them down again with his Greatest Caution technique. The Bronze Saints struggle to get up, remembering the words of the Gold Saints and fight back. Rhadamanthys attacks again and Seiya faces him once more. With his Pegasus Comet Fist, Seiya is able to damage his Surplice. Seiya's Final Cloth turns gold and he and Rhadamanthys fall down into the Underworld. As the sunrise gets closer, Dohko and Shion contemplate the fact that the Bronze Saints are fighting again. Shaka's message was actually a way to reach the Underworld, alive, which is where he and Saori are right now. Shion, confident that the Bronze Saints will awaken the Eighth Sense, based on the miracles they have achieved in the past, says goodbye to his old friend Dohko and disappears. He and Kanon head towards Hades' Castle. Shiryu, Hyoga and Shun burn their Cosmos, hoping to reach the Underworld alive. Seiya heads to the Underworld, hoping to reach Saori as he shouts Saori's name.

=== Chapter 2: Inferno (2005–07) ===
Part 1

No. overall	No. in season	Title	Original release date
128	14	"Cross Over! The Acheron River"; Transliteration: "Watare! Akerōn no kawa" (Japanese: 渡れ！アケローンの河)	December 17, 2005
Shiryu, Hyoga and Shun are about to jump into the hole leading to the Underworld, but Dohko stops them, warning them that only Specters will be able to reach that world alive. He also tells them that they must reach Arayashiki, known as the Eighth Sense. Shaka and Athena had reached this sense by being as close to death as possible, to reach the Underworld alive. Dohko and the Bronze Saints, thanks to their previous battles, awaken the Eighth Sense, and land in the Underworld. Seiya has made it as well, reaching the Eighth Sense beforehand and encounters Shun. Now they must find Saori and give her Cloth to her. Seiya and Shun reach the Acheron River, and see dead people who lived their lives in apathy and aren't allowed to cross the river. A boat comes with a Specter, Acheron Charon, who guides dead people across the river. He begins to fight the Saints, but offers them a ride in exchange for money. Shun offers Charon a golden pendant, something he has had since he was a baby. Even though Charon says it isn't enough, he gives them a ride. At the halfway point, Charon knocks Seiya off the boat where he is being dragged to the bottom by dead people who tried to swim across. Shun saves Seiya and he attacks, breaking through Charon's Rolling Oar defense. The Specter falls into the water, asking for help since only he knows the way to the other side. Shun helps him, but Charon attacks Seiya with Eddying Current Crusher. He then attacks Shun, but looks at his pure eyes, being aware of his pure heart and stops the attack, thinking he might end up in Elysium, a paradise for people chosen by the Gods. Thankful to Shun, Charon returns him his pendant and agrees to take him and Seiya to the other side, on the condition they settle the score. Charon explains the contents of the Underworld, consisting of 8 prisons, 3 valleys, 10 pits, and 4 spheres. Seiya and Charon continue their battle. Since Seiya has seen both of Charon's techniques, he is victorious, killing the Specter with his Pegasus Meteor Fist. Hyoga, Shiryu, Dohko and Kanon have also made it to the Underworld, but are in different parts of it. Seiya and Shun reach the First Prison, the Palace of Justice.
129	15	"The Tribunal Of Silence"; Transliteration: "Shizuka naru hōtei" (Japanese: 静かなる法廷)	December 17, 2005
Seiya and Shun reach the First Prison and encounter Markino, a skeleton that leads them to Balrog Rene, who judges the dead and sends them to their appropriate hell. Markino is then killed by Rene, using his Fire Whip, because of him not being quiet. Rene proceeds by showing Seiya his past crimes during his life with Reincarnation. Seiya is shown childhood memories, and the opponents he has defeated. He then tries to explain his actions, but Rene ignores him and sends him to the First Valley of the Sixth Prison, where people who have used violence against others in their lives boil in a lake of boiling blood. Shun rescues him, however Rene notices something strange about Shun. Shun tries to justify the actions of humanity, but is sliced to pieces with the Fire Whip. Rene is then scolded by Hades for cutting his body. In panic, he searches for the body, but Rhadamanthys appears, pointing out it was an illusion. Seiya and Shun are fine, wondering what happened. Rene discovers who made the illusion, Gemini Kanon, who wanted Rene to lead him to Hades. Kanon then destroys Rene with no difficulty and confronts Rhadamanthys about why he defeated Aiolia, Mu and Milo so easily, because of a barrier at Hades' Castle that lowered their strength to 1/10. Seiya and Shun arrive, but Kanon attacks them, reminding Shun to stop being sentimental, in order to save the innocent. He then tells them to go find Athena. Rhadamanthys attacks Kanon, but he counters with the Imperial Satanic Illusion to control him and kill Hades. He is interrupted by Specters who tell Rhadamanthys that Pandora wants to see him. As the Judge leaves, Kanon destroys the lower Specters with Galaxian Explosion.
130	16	"Legendary Saint Orphée"; Transliteration: "Densetsu no Seinto, Orufe" (Japanese: 伝説の聖闘士オルフェ)	January 21, 2006
Seiya and Shun reach the Second Prison and encounter Cerberus, the three-headed Watchdog of Hell. Sphinx Pharaoh, guardian of the Second Prison, feeds dead people who were greedy, to Cerberus. The beast tries to eat Seiya, but is defeated by both him and Shun. Suddenly, Lyra Orphée, a legendary Silver Saint just as powerful as the Gold Saints, appears. Pharaoh says that Orphée came to the Underworld willingly and serves Hades. Pharaoh uses Balance of Curse with his harp, about to tear out Seiya's heart. But Orphée plays his lyre and attacks with Stringer Nocturne, defeating the Bronze Saints. He then goes to a garden, visiting his beloved Eurydice, confined to a rock. Seiya and Shun, who survived the attack, arrive in the same garden and encounter Eurydice. She asks them to please help Orphée. She explains that back on Earth, Orphée and Eurydice lived as a couple, in love with each other. However, she was killed when she was bitten by a poisonous snake. Heartbroken, Orphée went to the Underworld, pleading with Hades to revive Eurydice's soul back to Earth, playing his lyre. Pandora lets him know that his request was granted, but on one condition: both must not look back, not even once, until they reached the surface. Wanting to keep Orphée in the Underworld to play his lyre for Hades, Pandora has Pharaoh trick Orphée with a mirror, reflecting a light resembling the sun's light. Orphée turned around, but Eurydice's lower body was confined to a rock. He decided to stay with her since then. Eurydice asks Seiya and Shun to take him back to Earth. Orphée ignores Seiya's request for help to defeat Hades, but Pharaoh appears, taking the Athena Cloth. After learning that Pharaoh reveals he is the reason Eurydice is bound to remain in the Underworld, Orphée prepares to fight Pharaoh.
131	17	"Orphée, The Sad Requiem"; Transliteration: "Orufe, kanashiki chinkonka" (Japanese: オルフェ 悲しき鎮魂歌)	January 21, 2006
Orphée plays his lyre, causing Pharaoh to drop the Athena Cloth and allowing Seiya to recover it. Pharaoh plays his harp, and one of Orphée's strings breaks. Pharaoh hates Orphée because he replaced him, entertaining Hades and Pandora with his harp. He then prepares his Balance of Curse, but it backfires. Orphée kills Pharaoh while holding the broken string with his teeth, and uses Stringer Nocturne. Realizing his mistake, Orphée says goodbye to Eurydice and takes Seiya and Shun to a secret passage, leading them to Hades' Palace in the Eighth Prison, Giudecca. Meanwhile, Shiryu, Hyoga and Kanon arrive in the Third Prison, were the dead move giant rocks, equivalent of their greed and desires. They encounter the prison's guardian, Golem Rock, but Shiryu, who is able to see again, easily kills him with a perfect Rising Dragon. Another Specter, Troll Ivan, is also easily killed by Hyoga's Diamond Dust before he gets the chance to properly introduce himself. Orphée arrives in Giudecca, with a trunk (where Seiya and Shun are hidden). Pandora opens it and it's filled with flowers, with Orphée wanting to give them to Hades. Not trusting him, Pandora thrusts the flowers with her spear, trying to see if there is anyone in there. Just then, Garuda Aiacos, Wyvern Rhadamanthys and Griffin Minos, the three Judges of the Underworld, arrive in Giudecca.
132	18	"Hades! A Surprising Possession"; Transliteration: "Hādesu! Kyōgaku no hyōi" (Japanese: ハーデス！驚愕の憑依)	February 18, 2006
Orphée plays his Death Trip Serenade, making Pandora and the three Judges fall asleep. Before he can attack Hades, Rhadamanthys strikes Orphée, knowing he would betray them. Seiya and Shun emerged from the trunk unscathed and attack the Judge. Hades appears, wearing Shun's pendant, and Hades's face looks exactly like Shun's. Orphée attacks with Stringer Fine, with Hades seemingly destroyed, but it is revealed to be a fake body. Rhadamanthys strikes Orphée's heart, ordering him to awake the other Judges and Pandora. Orphée, dying, tells Seiya to attack them both while he holds Rhadamanthys. Seiya awakens his Eight Sense and attacks with his Pegasus Meteor Fist. As Orphée dies, he entrusts the Bronze Saints with Athena. Rhadamanthys survives the attack, but Shun begins to act like Hades and his hair turns red. Seiya tries to snap him out of it, but Hades has taken over his body. Rhadamanthys attacks Seiya, defeating him. Both Seiya and Orphée's bodies are taken to the frozen hell in the Eighth Prison, Cocytus, where the dead who have committed crimes against the gods, are buried up to their heads. Pandora and the Judges awaken, and Hades sits on his throne. The Judges find it hard to believe the God of the Underworld used to be a Saint. Hyoga, Shiryu and Kanon arrive at a swamp in the Fourth Prison, guarded by Lycaon Phlegyas. Hyoga and Shiryu are defeated by him, but Kanon kills Phlegyas with his Galaxian Explosion. He takes the raft and the unconscious Saints with him to the Fifth Prison. At the Eighth Prison, Pandora tends to Hades' wounds from her spear, trying to find them in the trunk. She then calls him her younger brother.
133	19	"Violent Battle! The Road to Giudecca"; Transliteration: "Gekitō! Jyudekka e no michi" (Japanese: 激闘！ジュデッカへの道)	February 18, 2006
Shiryu and Hyoga recover as they reach the Fifth Prison, where the dead are forever burning. They encounter Kanon as he kills a giant Specter. Rhadamanthys arrives and tells the Saints about Seiya's defeat and Shun becoming Hades. Kanon tells Hyoga and Shiryu to continue while he fights Rhadamanthys and gains the upper hand. Suddenly, Aiacos and Minos come to kill Kanon and attack with their Galactica Illusion and Cosmic Marionattion, respectively. However, the strings from the Cosmic Marionattion are suddenly cut, releasing Kanon. Just then, with his Final Bronze Cloth and his reached Eighth Sense, Phoenix Ikki arrives. Kanon tells him that Shun is Hades, but Ikki doesn't believe it. When Ikki hears Pandora's name, though, he remembers that when he and Shun were children, Pandora, as a child, tried to take Shun from him, saying his body belongs to Hades. He hadn't seen her for years after that. Ikki is distracted and gets attacked by Aiacos. He then gets up, in tears, realizing Shun is going to sacrifice himself. After accepting his challenge, Aiacos sends Ikki flying with his Garuda Flap twice. On the second time, however, Ikki manages to knock down Aiacos. Back on Earth, Eagle Marin encounters a mysterious, but familiar young girl.

Part 2

No. overall	No. in season	Title	Original release date
134	20	"God's Punishment! Greatest Eclipse"; Transliteration: "Shinbatsu! Gureitesuto Ekurippusu" (Japanese: 神罰! グレイテスト·エクリップス)	December 15, 2006
Aiacos recovers and attacks Ikki with Galactica Illusion. At Giudecca, Hades and Pandora sense Ikki's powerful Cosmos. He asks Pandora to bring him before his throne. Ikki gets up and uses the Phoenix Illusion, with Aiacos seeing his own death in his head. Aiacos is then finally killed by Ikki's Flying Phoenix. Shortly after his victory and before he is able to challenge the two remaining Judges, Ikki is surrounded by a strange light and disappears. Pandora teleports Ikki to Giudecca. He is surprised to see his brother as Hades. Pandora reminds Ikki of when they first met, when he almost lost his life protecting his baby brother. Pandora, holding what looked like the Universe in a mantle, tried approaching the baby Shun, but a powerful Cosmo kept her at bay. Not willing to risk Shun's body, Pandora gives Shun the pendant seen earlier, and takes her leave. In the present, Ikki finally remembers everything. The pendant, which reads "Yours Ever", was from Hades, who chose Shun to be his vessel. Ikki destroys the pendant and knocks Pandora out of the way. He goes to his brother and tries to snap him out of it. Hades pushes Ikki back and reveals his plan, the Grand Eclipse. His plan is to align all the planets in the Solar System, blocking the Sun from the Earth. This eternal eclipse will cause Earth to undergo a new Ice Age, becoming a world of death. Ikki attacks Hades numerous times with a strengthened Cosmo which destroys most of the throne room, but his attacks are easily returned by the God. Suddenly, Hades begins strangling himself. Shun's spirit appears behind Hades and tells Ikki to destroy Hades once and for all.
135	21	"Ikki! Sorrowful Punch"; Transliteration: "Ikki! Dokoku no ken" (Japanese: 一輝! 慟哭の拳)	December 15, 2006
Ikki realizes that Shun allowed Hades to enter his body, to have the chance and sacrifice himself, like his constellation of Andromeda, to end the battle. Pandora tries to stop Ikki, but the Nebula Chain surrounds Ikki to protect him, giving him the opportunity to strike. Shun tells his brother not to worry, and that he is happy giving up his life if it means saving others. All the Saints in the Underworld sense Ikki's Cosmo. Ikki pierces Shun's chest and extracts Hades' soul from his body, destroying it. Suddenly, Hades' real soul emerges from Shun's chest, but it was all a dream in Seiya's head. In reality, Ikki had actually stopped his attack, injuring his fist in the process. Then Hades' hair turns from red to black, meaning he now has complete control over Shun's body. He then defeats Ikki with no effort. Pandora orders Harpy Valentine to bury Ikki at Cocytos and leaves Hades to be alone. Just then, Shaka appears, ready to kill Hades. Valentine buries Ikki in Cocytos, filled with Saints who lost their lives in the previous Holy Wars. Seiya discovers Aiolia, Mu and Milo are also buried here. He then asks Valentine to release him, informing him that he has Athena's Cloth. Valentine releases Seiya and is able to dodge his attacks. Seiya is knocked down and gets up again, but Valentine strikes back with his "Greed the Life" technique. Shaka prepares to strike, but Saori arrives.
136	22	"Athena! Offer your Life"; Transliteration: "Atena! Sono inochi o kakete" (Japanese: 女神! その命をかけて)	January 19, 2007
Seiya still struggles against Valentine, who attacks him again. The Specter tries to retrieve Athena's Cloth, but Seiya keeps him from taking it. Athena's Cosmo awaken Seiya and he stands to fight again. Meanwhile, Saori begs on her knees and asks Hades to stop the Grand Eclipse, but he refuses, yet Saori is willing to give up her life. Hades gives Shaka Pandora's trident, and orders him to kill Athena. But Shaka throws it at Hades, although Saori stops the trident. Hades points the trident at Shaka, but she stands in his way. Seiya and Valentine charge at each other, Seiya killing the Specter with his powerful Pegasus Meteor Fist. Saori stops the trident, and bleeds. She burns her Cosmos and as the blood touches Hades and hurts him, his hair color is changing back to red and then to green. Hades' soul escapes Shun's body and charges at her. Saori strikes him with the trident, stained with her blood. However, Hades attacks her and both gods disappear. Shiryu and Hyoga kill multiple Specters on their way to the Eighth Prison and sense Athena's Cosmo disappearing. Pandora, Kanon, Rhadamanthys, Minos, Dohko and Seiya also sense Hades' and Athena's Cosmos disappearing as Seiya lose the hope and shouts Saori's name before releasing the Athena Cloth.
137	23	"Desperation! The Wailing Wall"; Transliteration: "Zetsubō! Nageki no Kabe" (Japanese: 絶望! 嘆きの壁)	January 19, 2007
With words of encouragement from Marin, Seiya gets up and heads towards Giudecca with Athena's Cloth in his hand. He finds Shun back to normal and both go deeper into Hades' Temple. Back on Earth, Jabu, Ichi and Nachi see the eclipse, but are confident Seiya and his friends will return. At the orphanage, Seiya's childhood friend Miho and her students also see the eclipse. Seiya and Shun reach the Wailing Wall, which covers the path to the Elysium Fields. Shaka is there and tries to break through, but it is impossible, for only gods can go through it. Saori and Hades are on the other side of the wall. Shaka deduces that Hades' real body is located in the Elysium Fields. Just then, Athena's Cosmo burns throughout the Underworld. Some Specters reach Cocytos and find Valentine's corpse. Just then, Athena's Cosmo revives Aiolia, Mu and Milo. They quickly kill the Specters and as they head for Giudecca, they realize Ikki is gone. Shaka stops Seiya from wasting his energy, trying to break the wall and remembers that the only thing that can destroy the wall is sunlight. Shaka then expands his Cosmo in order to try to make sunlight. Dohko stops him from trying to sacrifice himself. Aiolia, Mu and Milo arrive as well. Mu shows Shaka that most of the beads from the rosary have changed, meaning most of the Specters have died. When all seems lost, Dohko knows how to bring sunlight to the Underworld. He reminds his fellow Gold Saints that their constellations and Cloths surround the Sun in the Ecliptic and have stored sunlight within them. Dohko then distributes his Libra weapons among the Gold Saints in order to destroy the Wailing Wall. Meanwhile, Marin has brought the mysterious and familiar girl with her towards the Sanctuary.
138	24	"Reunion! The Gold Cloths!"; Transliteration: "Shūketsu! Gōrudo Kurosu" (Japanese: 集結! 黄金聖衣)	February 6, 2007
The five Gold Saints burn their Cosmos and toss the weapons into the Wailing Wall, but are ineffective and come back to them. Shaina gathers with Jabu and the other Bronze Saints. Marin and Kiki arrive as well, deducing that chaos is occurring around the world, due to the Grand Eclipse. Seiya takes one of the weapons and attempt to destroy the Wailing Wall, like he did with the Main Breadwinner in Poseidon's Sanctuary, risking his life. Out of nowhere, a light appears. At the Sanctuary, lights coming from the Houses of Taurus, Cancer, Sagittarius, Capricorn, Aquarius and Pisces head towards the Underworld. Hyoga and Shiryu have made it through the last Prison and notice the lights headed toward Giudecca. The lights are the souls of the deceased Gold Saints and their Gold Cloths. All Gold Cloths have gathered in the Underworld, resonating with one another. Kanon removes his Gemini Cloth, sending it to Giudecca, and fights Rhadamanthys again, however, he seems to be at a disadvantage. Kanon takes a hold of Rhadamanthys and as they rise farther into the sky, he uses a final Galaxian Explosion, destroying them both. He then bids farewell to Athena and his brother, Saga. Hyoga and Shiryu make it to the Wailing Wall and see all 12 Gold Cloths in one place. Suddenly, the empty Gold Cloths come apart and begin to take shape.
139	25	"Farewell! Gold Saints!"; Transliteration: "Saraba! Ōgon no Seinto" (Japanese: さらば! 黄金の聖闘士)	February 6, 2007
Right before everyone's eyes, Aldebaran, Saga, Deathmask, Aiolos, Shura, Camus and Aphrodite came back to life. Friends and comrades happily reunite (Aiolos with Aiolia; Camus with Hyoga; Shura with Shiryu; Aldebaran with Seiya; Deathmask and Aphrodite with Mu; also, Kanon's soul unites with Saga), but the reunion is shortlived. Aiolos pulls out an arrow, preparing to fire it at the wall. Aiolia says goodbye and warns the Bronze Saints to leave. Dohko says all 12 Gold Saints will focus their Cosmos to Aiolos' arrow in order to destroy the wall, but it will cause an explosion so intense, that the Gold Saints will lose their lives. He explains that no human can reach the Elysium Fields, but the Bronze Saints can since their Cloths are bathed in Athena's blood. Dohko says that Hades cares about his body and keeps it sealed in Elysium, which is why he possesses a human whenever he revives. Finally, he orders them to destroy Hades' body, which will end the Holy Wars between Athena and Hades, forever. The 12 Gold Saints bid a heartbreaking farewell to the four Bronze Saints. Seiya and his friends, with tears in their eyes, bid farewell to the brave soldiers who taught them so much and escape. Dohko reminds Shiryu that Chunli prays for him and Shura reminds him of their battle and to remain strong. Camus reminds Hyoga of their battle and assures him he can win. Aphrodite also reminds Shun of their battle and believes he will make a miracle. Minos confronts the Bronze Saints and easily blocks their attacks. The 12 Gold Saints entrust the Earth, Athena and the future to the Bronze Saints as Aiolos fires the arrow, and causes a monstrous explosion, destroying the Wailing Wall. Minos is caught in the blast, seemingly defeated. Seiya and his friends rush back inside, seeing the Gold Saints have opened a path through the wall. But the Gold Saints have died, only the 12 Gold Cloths remained. Their spirits bid farewell to the Bronze Saints, reminding them to stay strong, fight for justice and never lose hope. Having mourned the Gold Saints' sacrifices, Seiya and his friends head towards the Elysium Fields to hand Athena her Cloth, destroy Hades and stop the Grand Eclipse. Saori is then shown trapped in a giant urn, turning red at the bottom. Ikki, who manages to escape from Cocytos, also heads towards the Elysium Fields, with Pandora watching him, remembering her childhood.

=== Chapter 3: Elysium (2008) ===
No. overall	No. in season	Title	Original release date
140	26	"The Deadly Battle to Elysium"; Transliteration: "Erishion e no shitō" (Japanese: エリシオンへの死闘)	March 7, 2008
The Bronze Saints head to the Elysium Fields, but Shiryu stays behind, sensing the presence of Specters. Three of them appear, Alraune Queen, Minotauros Gordon and Basilisk Sylphid. Shiryu fights them all at once, unleashing the force of Excalibur. Seiya, Hyoga and Shun reach the other side of the Wailing Wall, but find an inter-dimensional path of time and space. At the end of the path is a shining light, leading to the Elysium Fields. Minos, having survived the blast, catches up to them, with Hyoga staying behind to fight him. Hyoga makes an ice barrier while Seiya and Shun go forward. Minos breaks the barrier and uses Cosmic Marionation on Hyoga. Seiya is being dragged by the pressure of time and space, but then his Final Cloth grows wings, due to Athena's blood. He rescues Shun and both head to the Elysium Fields. Hyoga freezes the threads of the Marionation, immobilizing Minos and attacks with Aurora Execution. Minos barely survives and traps Hyoga with a remaining thread, but he is suddenly destroyed due to the dimensional pressure, proving only gods can walk the path. Hyoga and the others were spared because of their Final Cloths bathed in Athena's blood. Shiryu holds his own against the three Specters, taking their attacks head on and still fighting. He challenges all three to attack him at once and kill them with his master's technique, The One Hundred Dragons. With the pressure of the techniques, Shiryu flies all the way to the inter-dimensional path, where Hyoga is waiting for him. Sylphid somehow survived and goes after Shiryu but he is also destroyed by the pressure. With his Cygnus Wings, Hyoga takes Shiryu to the Elysium Fields. Meanwhile, Seiya has successfully made it and wakes up in a utopian paradise.
141	27	"Gods of Death and Sleep"; Transliteration: "Shi to Nemuri no kamigami" (Japanese: 死と眠りの神々)	March 7, 2008
Ikki is about to follow his friends, but Pandora warns him that if he enters the path, he will be destroyed, since his Final Cloth is not bathed in Athena's blood. The six final Specters follow them. Pandora hugs Ikki's back explains that 13 years ago, she lived a peaceful life in Heinstein Castle, before it became Hades' Castle. She lived with her parents, servants and many pets. One day, she found an old shed, locked for 200 years. Curious, she went inside, and found a box with Athena's seal. She opened it, releasing two deities, Thanatos and Hypnos, Gods of Death and Sleep and twin brothers. They tell Pandora that her mother will give birth to Hades' soul and order her to take care of it, giving her the power to control the Specters and promising her eternal life. When Hades' reincarnation arrived, everyone except Pandora died in the castle. That was also the reason she went after Shun long ago. After meeting Ikki and the Saints, she realized what Hades promised was a lie and decides to help him, by giving him a necklace that will let him travel to the Elysium Fields safely. Pandora then mysteriously dies, for betraying Hades, but not before warning Ikki of Thanatos and Hypnos, gods and Hades' most loyal servants. The six Specters appear and they are killed by Ikki. With their deaths, all 108 Specters have died. Ikki places Shaka's rosary on Pandora's body, promising to avenge her. With his Phoenix Wings, Ikki heads to the Elysium Fields. Nymphs warn Thanatos of a "demon" who entered the fields. The god investigates, meeting Seiya, who tells him Saori died. Hypnos, Thanatos' twin brother, appears, and reveals that Thanatos killed Pandora for helping Ikki. However, Hypnos has not killed Saori. Saori is in an urn, located outside a tower where Hades' body is located. Hypnos put her in a deep sleep, and the urn absorbs the blood of its victim. When the urn turns completely red, Saori will die. Seiya rushes to her rescue and Thanatos tries to stop him, but Seiya dodges the attack and counters while running towards Saori. Thanatos finally hits Seiya, destroying his Pegasus Wings. Meanwhile, Shaina, reunited with Marin, Jabu, Ichi, Ban, Geki, Nachi and Kiki, asks Marin where she was. Kiki then brings the mysterious girl and familiar from before. Marin reveals the girl's true identity: Seiya's long-lost older sister, Seika. Seiya hears his sister's voice, and gets up again, attacking Thanatos with his Pegasus Comet Fist.
142	28	"Gold Reinforcements"; Transliteration: "Ōgon no engun" (Japanese: 黄金の援軍)	May 2, 2008
Shaina tries talking to Seika, but she has amnesia. She lived all this time in a small village near the Sanctuary. Six years ago, when Seiya came to the Sanctuary, Seika also traveled to Greece, hoping to find her brother, but fell off a cliff, and almost died. An elderly villager found her and rescued her, but she lost her memories since then. Marin knows how Seika felt, because she was also searching for her younger brother. Thanatos recovers from Seiya's attack, but notices blood stains on himself. Angered that he was wounded by a human, he mercilessly attacks Seiya, but then decides to kill Seika from afar as revenge. Shaina and everyone else notice Seika is in pain. Thanatos shows him a manifested image, showing Seiya his sister Seika, telling him he is killing her. Kiki senses a powerful Cosmo about to attack Seika, and he stands in the way of the blast. Kiki senses another blast, and Marin takes the blow this time. Thanatos speaks to them, saying he will kill Seika. A third blast comes, and Shaina takes the hit. Jabu and everyone else burn their Cosmos, surrounding Seika, protecting her, telling Seiya to keep fighting, for they will keep his sister safe. They form a barrier, but Thanatos' blast breaks the barrier, injuring them. Seiya tries using the Pegasus Rolling Crash as his most powerful move, but it is useless against the evil god. Shun comes to Seiya's rescue, but Thanatos attacks him as well, destroying the Rolling Defense. Shiryu and Hyoga arrive, but their attacks are useless. Ikki finally arrives. Although he manages to break Thanatos' helmet, Ikki is also no match for Thanatos and suffers his Terrible Providence. However, Thanatos feels a strong vibration, coming from the 12 Gold Cloths. The five Bronze Saints get up again, but the Terrible Providence destroys all five of the Final Bronze Cloths. Suddenly, five Gold Cloths travel through the dimensions, arriving at the Elysium Fields. Now, Sagittarius Seiya, Libra Shiryu, Aquarius Hyoga, Virgo Shun and Leo Ikki prepare to fight Thanatos.
143	29	"Legendary God Cloths"; Transliteration: "Densetsu no Goddo Kurosu" (Japanese: 伝説の神聖衣)	May 2, 2008
Aiolos, Dohko, Camus, Shaka and Aiolia's spirits sent their Gold Cloths to help the Bronze Saints. Thanatos deduces that Poseidon sent the Cloths to the Elysium Fields. Back on Earth, Sorrento, who is travelling with Julian Solo, senses Poseidon in Julian's body. He tells Sorrento that he has sent the Gold Cloths, though still sealed, in order to help the Bronze Saints and also deduces the Grand Eclipse is launched by Hades, attempting to rule the Earth. Julian comes back to his senses and Poseidon returns to his eternal sleep. Seiya and his friends launch their signature moves against Thanatos at the same time, but they are ineffective, as the evil god destroys the Gold Cloths. Seiya begins to lose hope, but Saori speaks to him, urging him not to give up, since they are still alive. Marin, Shaina, Jabu and the others give him words of encouragement, and as Seiya yells out her name, Seika recovers her memory, screaming out her brother's name. Seiya recovers, burning his Cosmo, and amazingly, his destroyed Pegasus Bronze Cloth transforms and covers him, revealing a new Pegasus Cloth. Hypnos appears, revealing it is a God Cloth, a legendary armor capable of rivaling the armors worn by the Olympian Gods. Seiya recovers Athena's Cloth, taken by Thanatos, but as he attacks, Seiya blocks the technique and counters with True Pegasus Meteor Fist, destroying Thanatos' Cloth. Thanatos attacks again, but is finally killed by the True Pegasus Comet Fist. Seiya heads for Hades' Tower to save Saori.
144	30	"Awakening from Myth"; Transliteration: "Shinwa yori no kakusei" (Japanese: 神話よりの覚醒)	August 1, 2008
Hypnos stands in Seiya's way, but is unable to stop him and Seiya continues towards the tower. Ikki fights Hypnos but is tossed aside. Shun stops Hypnos with his Nebula Chain, as it changes into the Andromeda God Cloth covering his body. Ikki takes the chance to go and help Seiya. Hypnos uses Eternal Drowsiness to lull Shun into a deep sleep. Before Hypnos can kill Shun, Hyoga and Shiryu also awaken their Cygnus and Dragon God Cloths. Seiya finally arrives at Hades' Temple and finds Saori, with the urn almost completely red. Seiya tries attacking the urn, but Hades' soul appears, telling him to give up and that his attacks will come back to him if he launches them. Hypnos tries to make Hyoga and Shiryu fall asleep, but they avoid it, and team up to destroy the God of Sleep, allowing Shun to wake up. Ikki arrives to help Seiya, but after he is attacked, he is exposed to Athena's blood, which awakens the Phoenix God Cloth. Both Saints attack the urn, but are unable to break it. Ikki notices Hades' soul surrounding the Tower, deducing that Hades' body is located there. As Hypnos dies, he warns the Saints to stop Hades from entering his body, otherwise the world will come to ruin. Before Seiya and Ikki reach the body, it's too late. Hades' soul enters his own body, and the God of the Underworld resurrects, setting his sights on Athena, trapped in the urn. After easily repelling Seiya's and Ikki's charge, Hades then unsheathes his sword.
145	31	"To a World Overflowing with Light"; Transliteration: "Hikari afureru sekai e" (Japanese: 光あふれる世界へ)	August 1, 2008
Hades tries to slash Athena, but Ikki gets in the way, getting injured in the process. Believing humans will ruin the Earth further, Hades swears to destroy humanity. Shiryu, Hyoga and Shun arrive and all five God Saints combine their true signature moves, but it's useless as they are pushed back, yet Hades is injured. Hades is shocked because Seiya resembles first Pegasus Saint that injured him during the previous Holy War and learns that Seiya is the first Pegasus Saint's incarnation. Hades attacks and shows the God Saints the Grand Eclipse is near completion. Everyone thinks hope is all about to lost, but Seika senses that her younger brother and his friends won't lose so easily. Suddenly, Seiya and the God Saints are protected by energy spheres, made by Saori, allowing them to return to Earth. Saori awakens, recovering her blood. Seiya hands Athena her Cloth, and once she dons it, she breaks the urn and prepares for the final battle against Hades. Both gods question each other's opinions on humanity, with Saori siding with the humans. Hades moves in for the kill, but Seiya breaks free from the sphere and launches his True Pegasus Meteor Fist, injuring Hades further. However, Hades' sword pierces Seiya's chest, leaving him apparently dead in Saori's arms, and his Cosmo is disappearing. Saori, Shiryu and the others mourn their friend's death, but Saori questions Hades if he knows what love is, saying how strong it can be. Shiryu and the others come back from the spheres, burning their Cosmos uniting them with Athena's. Saori's scepter pierces Hades' body, killing him. As the Underworld, Hades' Temple and the Elysium Fields crumble, the Grand Eclipse has been extinguished, with the sun shining again upon the world and its inhabitants. Miho, Chunli, Julian and Sorrento look up at the sky with joy. Jabu, Ban, Ichi, Nachi, Geki, Marin, Shaina, Kiki and Seika are anxious to see Seiya again. Shiryu, Hyoga, Shun and Ikki carry Seiya's dead body and return with Saori to a world filled with light, as the Holy War between Athena and Hades has ended, forever.
