= Saint Seiya: Brave Soldiers =

2013 video game

- Developer: Dimps
- Publisher: Bandai Namco Entertainment
- Series: Saint Seiya
- Platform: PlayStation 3
- Release: JP: October 17, 2013; AU: November 21, 2013; EU: November 22, 2013; NA: November 26, 2013; Soldiers' Soul; PS3, PS4: AU: September 24, 2015 (PS4); JP: September 25, 2015; PAL: September 25, 2015; NA: October 6, 2015; Windows
- Genre: Fighting
- Modes: Single-player, multiplayer

Saint Seiya: Brave Soldiers (Note: Japanese: 聖闘士星矢(セイントセイヤ) ブレイブ・ソルジャーズ, Hepburn: Seinto Seiya Bureibu Sorujāzu) is a 2013 fighting video game developed by Dimps and published by Bandai Namco Entertainment for the PlayStation 3. It features characters and the story of Masami Kurumada's manga series Saint Seiya. It is the first Saint Seiya game to be released in North America.

An updated version, Saint Seiya: Soldiers' Soul (Note: Japanese: 聖闘士星矢(セイントセイヤ) ソルジャーズ・ソウル, Hepburn: Seinto Seiya Sorujāzu Sōru), was announced on April 12, 2015 and released on September 25 in Japan and Europe and worldwide on October 6 for the PlayStation 3 and PlayStation 4, with a Windows version launching in November the same year.

== Gameplay ==
Brave Soldiers is a fighting game featuring over 50 characters from the Saint Seiya manga. The super gauge in the game is referred to as the Cosmo Gauge (小宇宙ゲージ, Kosumo Gēji), which characters use to perform their finishing attacks, Burst Dash (バーストダッシュ, Bāsuto Dasshu), Burst Attack (バースト攻撃, Bāsuto Kōgeki), Seven Senses Awakening (セブンセンシズ覚醒, Sebun Senshizu Kakusei), and their special Big Bang Attacks (ビッグバンアタック, Bigu Ban Atakku). A character's strength can be increased through the use of an Orb (オーブ, Ōbu). The Saint Chronicle (セイントクロニクル, Seinto Kuronikuru) game mode has the player progress through battles based on the three main arcs of the original manga: the Sanctuary arc, the Poseidon arc, and the Hades arc. Also in the game is the Galaxian Wars (ギャラクシアンウォーズ, Gyarakushian Wōzu) mode, a tournament mode.

== Playable characters ==
Many of the playable characters have multiple forms that are separate playable characters, each with unique move sets and Big Bang Attacks. The God Warriors and Polaris Hilda are added in Soldiers' Soul.

Bronze Saints

- Pegasus Seiya (CV: Masakazu Morita)
  - Original Bronze Cloth
  - New Bronze Cloth
  - Gold New Bronze Cloth (DLC)
  - Final Bronze Cloth
  - Sagittarius Seiya
  - Odin Seiya (DLC)
  - God Cloth
  - New Bronze Cloth Original Color Edition (Exclusive Seiya Edition DLC)
  - Training Wear (DLC)
  - Plain Clothes (DLC)
  - Final Bronze Cloth Original Color Edition (DLC)
  - God Cloth Original Color Edition (DLC)
- Dragon Shiryū (CV: Takahiro Sakurai)
  - Original Bronze Cloth
  - No Cloth
  - New Bronze Cloth
  - Gold New Bronze Cloth (DLC)
  - Final Bronze Cloth
  - Libra Shiryū
  - Plain Clothes (DLC)
  - Final Bronze Cloth Original Color Edition (DLC)
- Cygnus Hyoga (CV: Hiroaki Miura)
  - Original Bronze Cloth
  - New Bronze Cloth
  - Gold New Bronze Cloth (DLC)
  - Final Bronze Cloth
  - Aquarius Hyoga
  - Plain Clothes (DLC)
  - Final Bronze Cloth Original Color Edition (DLC)
- Andromeda Shun (CV: Yuuta Kasuya)
  - Original Bronze Cloth
  - New Bronze Cloth
  - Gold New Bronze Cloth (DLC)
  - Final Bronze Cloth
  - Virgo Shun (DLC)
  - Plain Clothes (DLC)
  - Final Bronze Cloth Original Color Edition (DLC)
- Phoenix Ikki (CV: Katsuyuki Konishi)
  - Original Bronze Cloth
  - New Bronze Cloth
  - Gold New Bronze Cloth (DLC)
  - Final Bronze Cloth
  - Leo Ikki (DLC)
  - Plain Clothes (DLC)
  - Final Bronze Cloth Original Color Edition (DLC)
- Unicorn Jabu (CV: Hideo Ishikawa)
- Hydra Ichi (CV: Masaya Onosaka)

Silver Saints

- Eagle Marin (CV: Fumiko Inoue)
  - Training Wear (DLC)
- Ophiuchus Shaina (CV: Yuka Komatsu)
  - Training Wear (DLC)
- Lyra Orphée (CV: Hiroshi Kamiya)

Gold Saints

- Aries Mu (CV: Takumi Yamazaki)
  - Plain Clothes (DLC)
- Taurus Aldebaran (CV: Tesshō Genda)
- Gemini ???/Gemini Saga (CV: Ryōtarō Okiayu)
- Gemini Kanon (CV: Ryōtarō Okiayu)
- Cancer Deathmask (CV: Ryōichi Tanaka)
- Leo Aiolia (CV: Hideyuki Tanaka)
  - Training Wear (DLC)
- Virgo Shaka (CV: Yūji Mitsuya)
- Libra Dohko (CV: Kenyu Horiuchi)
- Scorpio Milo (CV: Toshihiko Seki)
- Sagittarius Aiolos (CV: Yusaku Yara)
  - Training Wear (DLC)
- Capricorn Shura (CV: Takeshi Kusao)
  - Gold Cloth Original Color Edition (DLC)
- Aquarius Camus (CV: Nobutoshi Kanna)
  - Plain Clothes (DLC)
- Pisces Aphrodite (CV: Keiichi Nanba)
- Former Aries Shion (CV: Nobuo Tobita) (Pre-order DLC)

Mariners

- Sea Horse Baian (CV: Sho Hayami)
- Siren Sorrento (CV: Yoku Shioya)
- Chrysaor Krishna (CV: Masaharu Sato)
- Scylla Io (CV: Issei Futamata)
- Lyumnades Caça (CV: Keaton Yamada)
- Kraken Isaac (CV: Ryusei Nakao)
- Sea Dragon Kanon (CV: Ryōtarō Okiayu)
  - Plain Clothes (DLC)

Specters

- Aries Shion (Surplice) (CV: Nobuo Tobita)
- Gemini Saga (Surplice) (CV: Ryōtarō Okiayu)
- Cancer Deathmask (Surplice) (CV: Ryōichi Tanaka)
- Capricorn Shura (Surplice) (CV: Takeshi Kusao)
- Aquarius Camus (Surplice) (CV: Nobutoshi Kanna)
- Pisces Aphrodite (Surplice) (CV: Keiichi Nanba)
- Wyvern Rhadamanthys (CV: Takehito Koyasu)
- Garuda Aiacos (CV: Shin-ichiro Miki)
- Griffon Minos (CV: Kōichi Tōchika)

Gods

- Poseidon (CV: Keiichi Nanba)
  - Tuxedo (DLC)
- Hades (CV: Akio Ōtsuka)
- Thanatos (CV: Toshio Furukawa)
- Hypnos (CV: Issei Futamata)

== Reception ==
Reception

Aggregate score
Aggregator	Score		
Aggregator	PC	PS3	PS4
Metacritic	N/A	55/100	59/100

Review scores
Publication	Score		
Publication	PC	PS3	PS4
Destructoid	N/A	6/10	N/A
Eurogamer	N/A	N/A	7/10
Famitsu	N/A	30/40	30/40
GameRevolution	N/A	3/5	N/A
GameSpot	N/A	6/10	N/A
GameZone	N/A	0.5/10	N/A
IGN	6/10	5.5/10	7/10
PlayStation Official Magazine – UK	N/A	4/10	N/A
PlayStation Universe	N/A	N/A	5.5/10

The game received "mixed" reviews according to the review aggregation website Metacritic. In Japan, Famitsu gave it a score of two eights and two sevens for a total of 30 out of 40.

Grant E. Gaines of Hardcore Gamer said that "while the single player offers a decent experience, the dumb AI and simple mechanics will limit your fun." Adam Ma of Gaming Union praised the game for its emulation of the anime series. However, he also highlighted that this same quality was also its main weakness: "Brave Soldiers is not a game designed to be balanced, but rather a game designed to emulate the show with the greatest accuracy possible."

Soldiers' Soul received mixed reviews from critics, albeit more positive than its predecessor. It has an aggregated score of 59/100 on Metacritic. Popular Japanese video game magazine Famitsu gave the game an overall score of 30/40.

Eurogamer Italy gave the game a score of 7/10, stating that "Saint Seiya: Soldiers' Soul is the classic more of the same, with a bunch of new characters and items added to the contents of the previous game. The combat system is fun and entertaining, but the lack of any kind of balance between the fighters can ruin the overall experience."

IGN Spain also gave it a 7/10, saying that "Dimps hasn't delivered once again. They could have made much more out of the universe of Saint Seiya."

PlayStation Universe gave a lower score of 5.5/10, describing the game as "A simplistic yet visually attractive take on anime that’s been around longer than most of the people reading this, Saint Seiya: Soldiers' Soul is a decent prospect for newcomers to the role-playing genre but ultimately holds far less appeal for long-time scrapping veterans who want a little more depth from their digital brawlers."
