= Saint Seiya: Gigantomachia =

Japanese light novel series

- First chapter cover

聖闘士星矢 ギガントマキア (Seinto Seiya Gigantomakia)
- Created by: Masami Kurumada
- Novel series
- Written by: Tatsuya Hamazaki
- Illustrated by: Shingo Araki
- Published by: Shueisha
- Imprint: Jump J-Books
- Original run: August 23, 2002 – December 16, 2002
- Volumes: 2

Saint Seiya: Gigantomachia (Japanese: 聖闘士星矢 ギガントマキア, Hepburn: Seinto Seiya: Gigantomakia) is a Japanese novel series written by Tatsuya Hamazaki and illustrated by Shingo Araki. It is a spin-off to the Saint Seiya manga series by Masami Kurumada. Two novels were released by Shueisha, under their Jump J-Books light novel imprint, in August and December 2002.

== Plot ==
In the early days of mythology, the goddess Athena, with the support of her Saints, waged countless wars to protect love and justice in the world, and in one of these battles they faced fearsome adversaries known as Gigas, who followed to the god Typhon. At the end of that terrible war, Typhon and the Gigas were finally defeated and sealed under Mount Etna in Sicily.

The Giants have returned with a single goal, to spread blood and death, making it known to their ancient enemy, Athena. These ancient beings wear a solid cloth called Adamas (which is usually as solid and hard as diamond itself) and to achieve their plans they first need to resurrect Typhon, their king.

The Sicily Island is a place where one of the hundred sons of Mitsumasa Kido was sent to train years ago, destined like his stepbrothers to become a Saint. A young man was called Mei, who stayed longer than expected in his training place, and the cloth of Coma that he's wearing doesn't belong to any of the ranks of Athena's army (bronze, silver or gold).

== Characters ==
=== Athena Army ===
- Saori Kido (Athena)

Bronze Saints

- Pegasus Seiya (天馬星座ペガサスの星矢, Pegasasu no Seiya)
- Cygnus Hyoga (白鳥星座の氷河, Kigunasu no Hyōga)
- Dragon Shiryu (龍星座ドラゴンの紫龍, Doragon no Shiryū)
- Andromeda Shun (アンドロメダ星座の瞬, Andoromeda no Shun)
- Phoenix Ikki (鳳凰星座の一輝, Phoenix no Ikki)
- Sextans Yulij (六分儀座(セクスタンス)のユーリ, Sekusutansu no Yūri)

Silver Saints

- Altar Nicole (祭壇星座(アルター)のニコル, Arutā no Nikoru)

Other

- Coma Mei (髪の毛座の盟, Kōma no Mei)

=== Gigas Army ===
- Typhon (テュポーン, Tyupōn)
- Agrios (アグリオス, Aguriosu)
- Enkelados (エンケラドス, Enkeradosu)
- Pallas (パラス, Parasu)
- Thoas (トアス, Toasu)

Other

- Chimera (キマイラ, Kimaira)
- Orthrus (オルトロス, Orutorosu)
- Ladon (ラードーン, Rādōn)

== Volume list ==
No.	Japanese release date	Japanese ISBN
1	August 23, 2002	4-08-703119-5
1. "Orestes" (オレステース, "Oresutēsu"); 2. "Athena Saints" (アテナの聖闘士, "Atena no Seinto"); 3. "Sicily" (シチリア, "Shichiria"); 4. "Resurrection" (復活, "Fukkatsu"); 5. "Intermediate" (中級, "Chūkyū")
2	December 16, 2002	978-4087031232
1. "Echidna" (エキドナ, "Ekidona"); 2. "Coma" (かみ, "Kami"); 3. "Blood" (血, "Chi"); 4. "Chronos" (クロノス, "Kuronosu"); 5. "Deus Ex Machina" (デウスエクスマキナ, "Deusuekusumakina")
