= Saint Seiya: Saintia Shō =

Japanese manga series

- Saintia Shō
- First tankōbon volume cover, featuring Equuleus Shō

聖闘士星矢(セイントセイヤ) セインティア翔(ショウ) (Seinto Seiya Seintia Shō)
- Genre: Magical girl; Science fiction
- Created by: Masami Kurumada
- Manga
- Written by: Chimaki Kuori
- Published by: Akita Shoten
- English publisher: NA: Seven Seas Entertainment
- Imprint: Champion Red Comics
- Magazine: Champion Red
- Original run: August 19, 2013 – July 19, 2021
- Volumes: 16
- Original net animation
- Directed by: Masato Tamagawa
- Produced by: Kaori Ami
- Written by: Ikuko Takahashi
- Music by: Toshihiko Sahashi
- Studio: Gonzo (Note: Animation studio); Toei Company (Note: Production company)
- Licensed by: Crunchyroll
- Released: December 10, 2018 – February 18, 2019
- Episodes: 10
- Manga

Memories
- Written by: Chimaki Kuori
- Published by: Akita Shoten
- Imprint: Champion Red Comics
- Magazine: Champion Red
- Original run: July 19, 2022 – March 19, 2026
- Volumes: 2

Saint Seiya: Saintia Shō (Japanese: 聖闘士星矢(セイントセイヤ) セインティア翔(ショウ), Hepburn: Seinto Seiya Seintia Shō), also known simply as Saintia Shō (セインティア翔), is a Japanese manga series written and illustrated by Chimaki Kuori. It is a spin-off of the manga series Saint Seiya by Masami Kurumada. Saintia Shō was serialized in Akita Shoten's Champion Red magazine from August 2013 to July 2021, with its chapters collected in sixteen tankōbon released.

A 10-episode original net animation produced by Toei Company and animated by Gonzo was broadcast from December 2018 to February 2019.

In North America, manga publisher Seven Seas Entertainment licensed the manga for an English-language release in 2017.

== Premise ==
Set during the events of Saint Seiya, Saint Seiya: Saintia Shō follows the traditional central plot common to Kurumada's original work and its derivative works: Athena, the Greek goddess of justice and heroic endeavor, returns when evil consumes Earth, and battles antagonistic deities, the agents of evil, with the assistance of her army of warriors known as Saints, protected by their Cloths, battle armors that represent their guardian constellations. The main character in the series is a young female Saint named Shō, who protects Athena and her Sanctuary from the attack of Goddess of Discord, Eris. The series introduces a new class of female Saints, which are known as Saintia (聖闘少女(セインティア), Seintia; kanji for "Holy Fighting Girls", also romanized as Saint-ia), Athena's personal maidens.

== Characters ==
The series introduces new characters and features many from Kurumada's original manga and Saint Seiya: Next Dimension. Voice actors are provided when the character appeared in an accompanying drama CD series.

=== Saintia ===
Equuleus Shō (子馬座(エクレウス)の翔, Ekureusu no Shō)
Voiced by: Aina Suzuki
One of the Saintia of Okinawan origin, Athena's personal bodyguard Saints, who wears the Equuleus Bronze Cloth. As she has mastered her Cosmo, she is able to channel it in a powerful and fast attack, the Equuleus Meteor Punch (エクレウス流星拳, Ekureusu Ryūsei-ken). Her real name is Shōko (翔子) and she is later revealed to be the daughter of Olivia, the leader of Saintia.
Equuleus Kyōko (子馬座(エクレウス)の響子, Ekureusu no Kyōko)
Voiced by: Mao Ichimichi
Shōko's elder sister and previous Equuleus Saintia. She also mastered the Equuleus Meteor Punches. Like her sister, she is the daughter of Olivia.
Dolphin Mii (いるか座(ドルフィン)の美衣, Dorufin no Mii)
Voiced by: Megumi Nakajima
Saori's personal secretary from Belgium, who is a Saintia wearing the Delphinus Bronze Cloth. Her true name is Alicia Benethol (アリシア・ベネトール, Arishia Benetōru).
Ursa Minor Xiaoling (小熊座(ウルサミノル)のシャオリン, Urusaminoru no Shaorin)
Voiced by: Suzuko Mimori
A Singaporean Saintia who wears the Ursa Minor Bronze Cloth. Her real name is Xing Xiaoling (星(シン) 暁鈴(シャオリン), Shin Shaorin; pinyin: Xīng Xiǎolíng).
Corona Borealis Katia (冠座(ノーザンクラウン)のカティア, Nōzan Kuraun no Katia)
Voiced by: Yukiko Morishita
A long-haired Ukrainian Saintia who wears the Corona Borealis Bronze Cloth. After having been poisoned by Eris in the past, she has begun working directly with the Pope against Saori's wishes.
Cassiopeia Erda (カシオペア座のエルダ, Kashiopea-za no Eruda)
Voiced by: Ayana Taketatsu
A short-haired Chilean Saintia wearing the Cassiopeia Bronze Cloth who wishes to one day become a Gold Saint.

=== Athena's circle ===
Saori Kido (城戸 沙織, Kido Saori)
Voiced by: Inori Minase
The head of the Graude Foundation and current incarnation of Athena (アテナ, Atena), Greek goddess of justice, wisdom, and heroic endeavour, who always reincarnates when evil consumes Earth. She has stopped the ambitions of evil deities since the ages of myth, assisted by her Saints. Although she's received elite education since her childhood, however, she's still in her teens. As such, she attends at the Meteros Academy in formality, and also serves as its student council president.
Mitsumasa Kido (城戸 光政, Kido Mitsumasa)
Saori's adopted grandfather.
Tatsumi (辰巳)
Voiced by: Hisao Egawa
Saori's butler.

=== Bronze Saints ===
Unicorn Jabu, Pegasus Seiya, Dragon Shiryū, Andromeda Shun, Cygnus Hyōga, Phoenix Ikki, Lionet Ban, Wolf Nachi, Bear Geki, and Hydra Ichi appear in Saint Seiya: Saintia Shō.

=== Silver Saints ===
Scutum Juan (楯座(スキュータ)のユアン, Sukyūtamu no Yuan)
The Scutum Silver Saint.
Southern Cross Georg (南十字座(サザンクロス)のゲオルク, Sazan Kurosu no Georuku)
The Crux Silver Saint.
Pavo Mayura (孔雀座(パーヴォ)のマユラ, Pavo no Mayura)
Voiced by: Rina Satō
The Pavo Silver Saint, injured during the revolt in Athena's sanctuary, thirteen years earlier and unable to walk. She agrees to train Sho to become a Saint, and aids the Saintias at various times in the story.
Crateris Aisone (杯座(クラテリス)のアイソン, Crateris no Aison)
The Crater Silver Saint, saved Mayura after she was attacked by Capricorn Shura. He returns as a Dryad.

Canis Major Sirius, Hound Asterion, Sagitta Ptolemy, Eagle Marin, and Ophiuchus Shaina also appear in Saint Seiya: Saintia Shō.

=== Gold Saints ===
Scorpio Milo (蠍座(スコーピオン)のミロ, Sukōpion no Miro)
Voiced by: Takahiro Sakurai; Toshihiko Seki
One of the twelve Gold Saints of Athena, virtuous and prideful. He saved Shōko's life in the past.
Leo Aiolia (獅子座(レオ)のアイオリア, Reo no Aioria)
Voiced by: Yūichirō Umehara; Hideyuki Tanaka
Regarded as the pride of Sanctuary along Scorpio Milo, the Leo Gold Saint, whose heart burns with loyalty towards Athena.
Gemini Saga (双子座(ジェミニ)のサガ, Gemini no Saga)
Voiced by: Ryotaro Okiayu
The Gemini Gold Saint who conspired to take over Sanctuary. He somehow saved Katya's life and appears impersonating the true Pope of Sanctuary.

Sagittarius Aiolos, Pisces Aphrodite, Cancer Deathmask, Capricorn Shura, Aquarius Camus, Aries Mu, Taurus Aldebaran, and Virgo Shaka also appear in Saint Seiya: Saintia Shō.

=== Antagonists ===
Eris (エリス, Erisu)
Voiced by: Yū Kobayashi
The evil goddess of discord, mortal enemy of Athena since the ages of myth. Her warriors are known as Dryads (邪精霊（ドリアード）, Doriādo; "Evil Spirits") who wear armor known as Leaves (邪霊衣（リーフ）, Rīfu; "Evil Spirit Mantle"). Eris's forces also contain dead Saints called Ghosts (邪霊士（ゴースト）, Gōsuto; "Evil Spirit Warrior"), brought back to life with an Evil Seed (イヴィル・シード, Iviru Shīdo) from the tree Uterus (争いの大樹（ウテルス）, Uterusu).
Toki (斗樹)
One of the hundreds of orphans who had been sent across the world to become a Saint, only to be tainted by Eris and become a Ghost. He was one of Jabu's friends as a child.
Orion Rigel (オリオン座のリゲル, Orion-za no Rigeru)
The fallen Orion Silver Saint.

=== Dryads ===
Dryads (邪精霊)
Warriors protecting Eris. They are generally humans who have died but offered their souls to Eris and given a second life.
Ruin Atë (破滅(ルイン)のアテ, Ruin no Ate)
Voiced by: Rika Tachibana
The leader of the Dryads.
Malice Emoni (悪意(マリス)のエモニ, Marisu no Emoni)
Voiced by: Marika Kōno
A young woman in Gothic Lolita dress who carries around a teddy bear named "Mick" (ミック, Mikku) who she talks to.
Murder Phonos (殺戮(マーダー)のフォノス, Mādā no Fonosu)
Voiced by: Kenji Nojima
The only male Dryad.
Attack: Despair Bite
Harmonia (エデンの魔女 ハルモニア, Eden no Majo Harumania)
Harmonia is a guide & prevents intruders from entering the Garden of Eden
Attack: Breath of Paradise - an attack that turns the opponent into flowers and become a part of Garden of Eden

=== Support characters ===
Mirai (ミライ) and Cinato (シナト, Shinato)
Voiced by: Aki Kanada, Akeno Watanabe
Young disciples of Mayura.
Lumi (ルミ, Rumi)
Voiced by: Ayaka Ōhashi
Shoko's best friend.

== Media ==
=== Manga ===
Saint Seiya: Saintia Shō is written and illustrated by Chimaki Kuori. Kuori is known by her work on the manga adaptation of the Gundam SEED anime and in the Kimi no Kaeru Bashō manga series. Saintia Shō started its serialization in Akita Shoten's Champion Red magazine on August 19, 2013.

North American manga publisher Seven Seas Entertainment licensed the manga in 2017.

On July 19, 2022, a side-story spin-off manga by Kuori began serialization in Champion Red.

==== Volumes ====
No.	Original release date	Original ISBN	English release date	English ISBN
1	December 6, 2013	978-4-253-23593-8	February 20, 2018	978-1-626927-52-0
1. Prologue (プロローグ, Purorōgu); 2. Shōko and Kyōko (翔子と響子, Shōko to Kyōko); 3. The Saintia of Athena (女神（アテナ）の聖闘少女（セインティア）, Atena no Seintia); 4. Evil Ghost Ate (邪精霊アテ, Jaseirei Ate); 5. Destiny (宿命, Shukumei)
2	June 20, 2014	978-4-253-23594-5	May 22, 2018	978-1-626927-91-9
5. The Decisions of Either (それぞれの決意, Sorezore no Ketsui); 6. Evil Seed (邪悪なる種子, Ja'akunaru Shushi); 7. Virtue and Vice (正と邪, Masa to Ja); 8. Reunion (再会, Saikai)
3	October 20, 2014	978-4-253-23595-2	October 21, 2018	978-1-626928-63-3
9. A Heart That Not Give Up (あきらめない心, Akiramenai Kokoro); 10. The Golden Warrior (黄金の戦士, Ōgon no Senshi); 11. Traitorous Star (裏切りの星, Uragiri no Hoshi); 12. Conclusion (決着, Kecchaku)
4	February 20, 2015	978-4-253-23596-9	November 27, 2018	978-1-626929-46-3
13. Galaxian Wars (銀河戦争, Gyarakushian Wōzu); 14. Like the Pegasus (ペガサスのように, Pegasasu no Yōni); 15. Katja (カティア, Katia); 16. Aphrodite (アフロディーテ, Afurodīte)
5	May 20, 2015	978-4-253-23597-6	February 19, 2019	978-1-626929-93-7
17. Good and Evil (善と悪, Zen to Aku); 18. The Wriggling Shadow --> (蠢く影, Ugomeku Kage); 19. Eve of the Decisive Battle (決戦前夜, Kessen Zen'ya); 20. A Heart that Goes Towards (向かう心, Mukau Kokoro); 21. Deadly Battle of the Twelve Palaces (十二宮の死闘, Jūnikyū no Shitō)
6	October 20, 2015	978-4-253-23598-3	May 21, 2019	978-1-642750-83-6
22. Eris Reborn (復活のエリス, Fukkatsu no Erisu); 23. Temple of the Wicked Tree (邪樹の神殿, Jaju no Shinden); 24. Garden of Evil (悪意の庭, Aku no Niwa); 25. Oath (誓い, Chikai); 26. Protectors (護り人たち, Mamori Hito-tachi)
7	March 18, 2016	978-4-253-23599-0	August 6, 2019	978-1-642751-24-6
27. The Golden Apple (黄金の林檎, Ōgon no Ringo); 28. Spellbinding (呪縛, Jubaku); 29. Incursion (突入, Totsunyū); 30. Conflicted Feelings (相克の想い, Sōkoku no Omoi)
8	June 8, 2016	978-4-253-23600-3	November 5, 2019	978-1-642757-27-9
31. Whirlpool of Conflict (争いの渦, Arasoi no Uzu); 32. Chance Encounter (邂逅, Kaigō); 33. On the Star-Raining Hill (星降る丘にて, Hoshifuru Oka nite); 34. Temple of the Moon (月の神殿, Tsuki no Shinden)
9	December 20, 2016	978-4-253-23601-0	March 17, 2020	978-1-64505-223-4
35. Sprout (萌芽, Hōga); 36. Enemy (仇敵, Kyūteki); 37. To Sanctuary (聖域にて, Sankuchuari Nite); 38. Obsession (執心, Shūshin); 39. Inside the Ancient Forest (古の森の奥, Ko no Mori no Oku); 40. Special Star (特別な星, Tokubetsuna Hoshi)
10	August 18, 2017	978-4-253-23602-7	May 5, 2020	978-1-64505-458-0
41. Comet Repulse (彗星レパルス, Suisei Revurusu); 42. Invasion (侵攻, Shinkō); 43. Captured Goddess (囚われの女神, Toraware no megami); 44. The Saintia's Duty (聖闘少女のつとめ, Saintia no tsutome); 45. Karma (因縁, In'nen); 46. Celestial Eden (天上のエデン, Tenjō no Eden) (Note: Originally titled "Tatakai no butai e" (闘いの舞台へ; lit. "To the battle stage") in Champion Red.)
11	February 20, 2018	978-4-253-23881-6	August 4, 2020	978-1-64505-524-2
47. Bottom of the Abyss (奈落の底, Naraku no soko); 48. Challenge (挑戦, Chōsen); 49. Flames of Justice (正義の炎, Seigi no honō) (Note: Originally titled "Nikushimi" (憎しみ; lit. "Hatred") in Champion Red.); 50. Voice of Destruction (滅びの声, Horobi no koe); 51. Antithesis (抗うもの, Aragau mono); 52. Golden Soul (黄金の魂, Kogane no tamashī)
12	December 20, 2018	978-4-253-23882-3	February 9, 2021	978-1-64505-813-7
53. Fallen from Heaven (天より降るもの, Ten yori furu mono); 54. Invitation into Despair (絶望への誘い, Zetsubō e no sasoi); 55. Loser's Game (敗者のゲーム, Haisha no gēmu); 56. Oblivion (忘却, Bōkyaku); 57. Scar (傷跡, Kizuato); 58. Sorrowful Resolve (悲しき決意, Kanashiki ketsui); 59. Thawing (雪解け, Yukidoke)
13	August 20, 2019	978-4-253-23883-0	May 25, 2021	978-1-64827-084-0
60. The Price of a Wish (願の代償, Gan no daishō); 61. Longing (渇望, Katsubō); 62. First Star (一番星, Ichiban hoshi); 63. Wish Poison (願いの毒, Negai no doku); 64. Flower Arrangement (徒花, Adabana); 65. Guide to Ruin (破滅への導き, Hametsu e no michibiki)
14	September 17, 2020	978-4-253-23884-7	September 7, 2021 (digital); September 14, 2021 (physical)	978-1-64827-292-9
66. Wings of Hope (希望の翼, Kibō no tsubasa); 67. Negai no ryūsei (願いの流星); 68. Tōsō no ha (闘争の刃); 69. Orenai kokoro (折れない心); 70. Chikai no hana (誓いの花); 71. Atena no kokoro (アテナの心); 72. Mezame (目覚め)
15	April 20, 2021	978-4-253-23885-4	September 27, 2022 (digital); January 10, 2023 (physical)	978-1-63858-282-3
73. Rakuen no majo (楽園の魔女); 74. Yadoru honō (宿る炎); 75. Tatakai no kyōdai (戦いの兄妹); 76. Senjin kakusei (戦神覚醒); 77. Game over (ゲームオーバー, Gēmu Ōbā); 78. Ketsui no ya (決意の矢); 79. Bohyō (墓標); 80. Yami no fuka (闇の深); 81. Seinto no seigi (聖闘士の正義)
16	January 20, 2022	978-4-253-23886-1	January 17, 2023	978-1-63858-665-4
82. Yobigoe (呼び声); 83. Dai shūketsu!? (大集結!!); 84. Kanojo no negai (彼女の願い); 85. Yorisou kokoro (寄り添う心); 86. Shinji au chikara (信じあう力)

=== Anime ===
An original net animation has been announced. The series began airing on December 10, 2018, and ended on February 18, 2019. The series was produced by Toei Company with animation services done by Gonzo and directed by Masato Tamagawa, with Ikuko Takahashi handling series composition. Keiichi Ishikawa and Ayana Hishino were the series' character designers, while Toshihiko Sahashi has composed the series' music. The opening theme song is "The Beautiful Brave", performed by Aina Suzuki, Mao Ichimichi, Inori Minase, and Megumi Nakajima. The series is simulcast by Crunchyroll.

No.	Title	Original release date
1	"The Fated Sisters! Shoko and Kyoko"; Transliteration: "Shukumei no Shimai! Shōko to Kyōko" (Japanese: 宿命の姉妹！翔子と響子)	December 10, 2018
2	"Individual Decisions! The Goddess and Saintias"; Transliteration: "Sorezore no Ketsui! Megami to Seintia" (Japanese: それぞれの決意！女神と聖闘少女(セインティア))	December 17, 2018
3	"Blooming in Darkness! The Dryads of Eris"; Transliteration: "Yami ni Saku! Erisu no Doriādo-tachi" (Japanese: 闇に咲く！エリスの邪精霊(ドリアード)たち)	December 24, 2018
4	"The Reunion of Sorrow! The Bond of the Separated Sisters"; Transliteration: "Kanashimi no Saikai! Hedatareta Shimai no Kizuna" (Japanese: 哀しみの再会！隔たれた姉妹の絆)	January 7, 2019
5	"Fly! Like Pegasus"; Transliteration: "Tobe! Pegasasu no Yō ni" (Japanese: 翔べ！ペガサスのように)	January 14, 2019
6	"Colliding Souls! Saori vs. Grand Master"; Transliteration: "Semegiau Tamashī! Saori tai Kyōkō" (Japanese: せめぎ合う魂！沙織vs.教皇)	January 21, 2019
7	"The Battle of the Twelve Temples! The Allurement of the Terrifying Ghosts"; Transliteration: "Jūnikyū no Shitō! Osorubeki Jarei no Genwaku" (Japanese: 十二宮の死闘！恐るべき邪霊の幻惑)	January 28, 2019
8	"A Clash of Nightmares! The Fists of Leo Flares Up"; Transliteration: "Akumu no Gekitotsu! Moeagaru Shishi no Ken" (Japanese: 悪夢の激突！燃えあがる獅子の拳(けん))	February 4, 2019
9	"A Spiral of Conflict! The Golden Apple and Orion's Devotion"; Transliteration: "Arasoi no Uzu! Ōgon no Ringo to Orion no Kenshin" (Japanese: 争いの渦！黄金の林檎とオリオンの献身)	February 11, 2019
10	"Shine Saintias! At the End of a Noble Prayer!"; Transliteration: "Kagayake Shōjo-tachi yo! Kedakaki Inori no Hate ni" (Japanese: 輝け少女たちよ！気高き祈りの果てに)	February 18, 2019
