= Jesús Barrero =

Mexican actor (1957–2016)

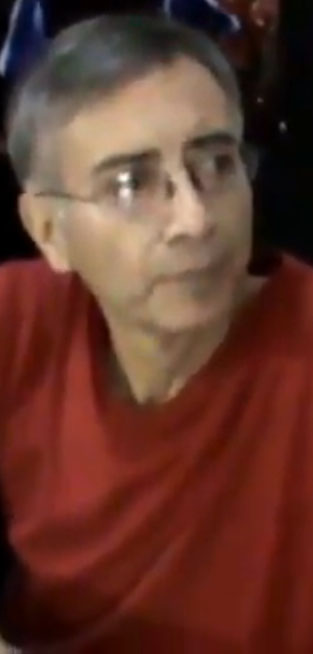
- Born: José de Jesús Barrero Andrade; July 26, 1957; Mexico City, Mexico
- Died: February 16, 2016 (aged 58); Mexico City, Mexico
- Occupation: Actor
- Years active: 1968–2016
- Spouse: Mónica Sierra
- Children: Yectli Barrero Palestino

José de Jesús Barrero Andrade (July 26, 1957 – February 16, 2016), better known by his stage name Jesús Barrero, was a Mexican actor who specialized in dubbing.

== Biography ==
Barrero began his acting career in 1968 at the age of nine playing secondary roles in theater and voice-over work. He made his debut in a leading role four years later with the Latin American Spanish dub of the PBS series Big Blue Marble. Barrero was best known for his roles as the voice of Pegasus Seiya in Saint Seiya, Rick Hunter and Scott Bernard in Robotech, Koji Kabuto in Mazinger Z, Kuzco in The Emperor's New Groove, Jason Lee Scott in Mighty Morphin Power Rangers, Koji Minamoto in Digimon Frontier, Rex in the Toy Story series, Luke Skywalker in the Star Wars saga, and Yoichi Hiruma in Eyeshield 21.

Barrero was diagnosed with lung cancer in March 2015, and died from the disease on February 17, 2016, at the age of 58. His last film role was in Star Wars: The Force Awakens as the voice of Luke Skywalker.

== Filmography ==
=== Animation ===
List of voice performances in animation
Year	Film	Role
1979	Captain Future	Grag
1982	Mazinger Z	Kouji Kabuto
1984	Thomas the Tank Engine and Friends	Harold The Helicopter
1984	Macross	Rick Yamada (one episode)
1985	Robotech: The New Generation	Scott Bernard
1985	Robotech	Rick Hunter
1991-1992	Yo Yogi!	Huckleberry Hound
1993-1995	Mighty Morphin Power Rangers	Jason Lee Scott
1995-2006	Saint Seiya	Pegasus Seiya
1995-1999	Timon and Pumbaa	Banzai
1996-1998	Sailor Moon	Kelvin Taylor and Andrew
2001-2003	House of Mouse	Kuzco and Banzai
2001-2002	Digimon Tamers	Impmon/Beelzemon
2002-2003	Digimon Frontier	Kouji Minamoto
2005-2008	Eyeshield 21	Yoichi Hiruma
2006-2008	The Emperor's New School	Kuzco
2012	Saint Seiya Omega	Pegasus Seiya

=== Feature films ===
List of voice performances in feature films
Year	Title	Role
1970	Santa Claus Is Comin' to Town	Kris Kringle/Santa Claus
1976	Carrie	Billy Nolan
1978	M*A*S*H	Duke Forrest
1979	Alien	Kane
1979	The Rose	Huston Dyer
1981	Omen III: The Final Conflict	Brother Simeon
1981	The Evil Dead	Ash
1981	Friday the 13th Part II	Jeffrey
1984	A Nightmare on Elm Street	Glenn Iantz
1984	Ghostbusters	Louis Tully
1984	Splash	Jerry
1984	The Terminator	Matt Buchanan
1984	The NeverEnding Story	Atreyu
1985	Legend	Ogro
1985	Codename: Robotech	Lynn Kyle
1985	The Breakfast Club	John Bender
1985	Stand by Me	Chris Chambers
1986	The Money Pit	Walter Fielding, Jr.
1987	Evil Dead II	Ash
1988	Rocket Gibraltar	Kane Rockwell
1989	Ghostbusters II	Louis Tully
1989	Turner & Hooch	Detective Scott Turner
1990	Pretty Woman	David Morse
1990	The NeverEnding Story II: The Next Chapter	Atreyu
1991	Rock-A-Doodle	Stuey
1992	Army of Darkness	Ash
1992	FernGully: The Last Rainforest	Pips
1994	Lily C.A.T.	Hiro Takagi
1994	The Next Karate Kid	Eric McGowen
1994	The Lion King	Banzai
1994	Street Fighter II: The Animated Movie	Ryu Hoshi
1995	Akira	Eiichi Watanabe
1995	Toy Story	Rex
1996	Sleepers	Lorenzo Shakes
1998	FernGully 2: The Magical Rescue	Pips
1998	Mulan	Chien-Po
1998	Quest for Camelot	Garret
1998	A Bug's Life	Flik
1999	Toy Story 2	Rex
2000	An Extremely Goofy Movie	Bradley Cremanata III
2000	The Emperor's New Groove	Kuzco
2001	Shrek	The Gingerbread Man
2001	Osmosis Jones	Osmosis Jones
2001	The Fast and the Furious	Brian O'Conner
2001	Harry Potter and the Philosopher's Stone	Professor Quirinus Quirrell
2001	Mickey's Magical Christmas: Snowed in at the House of Mouse	Kuzco
2001	Monsters, Inc.	Rex
2002	Mickey's House of Villains	Banzai
2002	Treasure Planet	BEN
2004	Home on the Range	Buck
2004	Shrek 2	The Gingerbread Man
2004	The Lion King 1½	Banzai
2005	Kronk's New Groove	Kuzco
2006	Happy Feet	Lombardo
2006	The Santa Clause 3: The Escape Clause	Jack Frost
2007	Meet the Robinsons	Frankie the Frog
2007	Shrek the Third	The Gingerbread Man
2007	Shrek the Halls	The Gingerbread Man
2010	Shrek Forever After	The Gingerbread Man
2010	Toy Story 3	Rex
2010	The Expendables	Lee Christmas
2012	The Expendables 2	Lee Christmas
2015	Star Wars: The Force Awakens	Luke Skywalker
