= Hyoga =

Hyoga may refer to:

- Cygnus Hyoga, a character in the manga series Saint Seiya
- Hyoga Akatsuki, a character in Dr. Stone manga series
