= Kenji Akabane =

Japanese voice actor (born 1984)

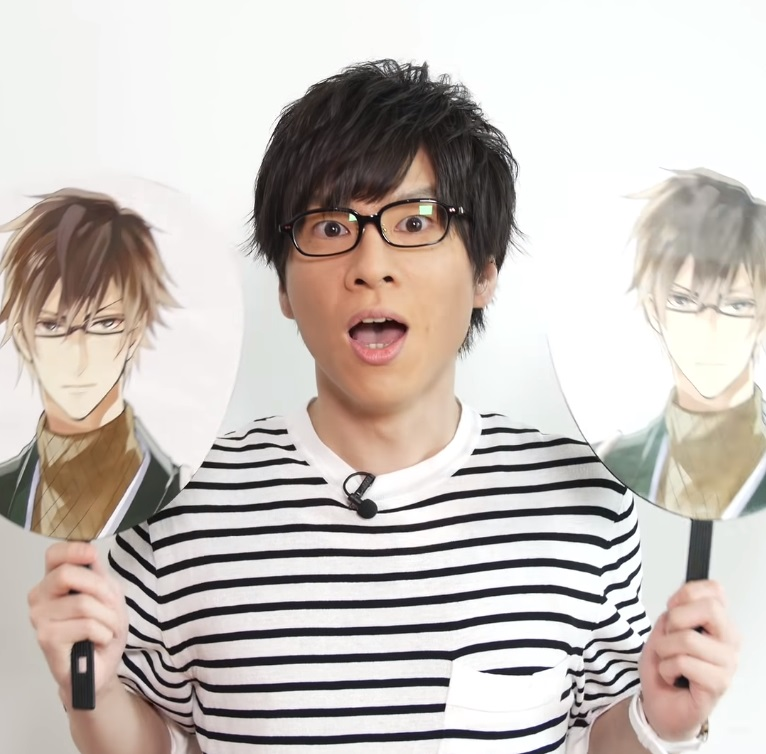
- Born: October 31, 1984 (age 41); Chiba, Japan
- Occupation: Voice actor
- Years active: 2008–present
- Agent: Aoni Production

Kenji Akabane (赤羽根 健治, Akabane Kenji; born October 31, 1984) is a Japanese voice actor. His first starring role was as Kouji Kabuto in Shin Mazinger Shougeki! Z Hen and he also went on to portray the Producer in the anime adaptation of The Idolmaster video game series. In 2014, he provided the voice of Dragon Shiryū in the film Saint Seiya: Legend of Sanctuary, a role he said was "cool" and "serious".

== Roles ==
=== Anime television series ===
2009

- Eden of the East (AKX20000)
- Shin Mazinger Shougeki! Z Hen (Koji Kabuto)
- Taishō Baseball Girls (Izawa)

2010

- One Piece (Reuder)

2011

- Bakugan: Gundalian Invaders (Koji Beetle)
- The Idolmaster (Producer)

2012

- Brave 10 (Niko)
- Magi: The Labyrinth of Magic (M Nando)
- Senki Zesshō Symphogear (Sakuya Fujitaka)
- Sword Art Online (Tetsuo)

2013

- Cardfight!! Vanguard (Kenji Mitsusada)
- Meganebu! (Akira Souma)
- Senki Zesshō Symphogear G (Sakuya Fujitaka)
- Space Battleship Yamato 2199 (Yasuo Nanbu)

2014

- Atelier Escha & Logy: Alchemists of the Dusk Sky (Awin Sidelet)
- Terra Formars (Ivan Perepelkin)

2015

- Anti-Magic Academy: The 35th Test Platoon (Kyouya Kirigaya)
- Chaos Dragon (Fugaku)
- Punch Line (Ryuuto Teraoka)
- Senki Zesshō Symphogear GX (Sakuya Fujitaka)
- Triage X (Arashi Mikami)

2016

- Hybrid x Heart Magias Academy Ataraxia (Kizuna Hida)
- Three Leaves, Three Colors (Mitsugu Yamaji)
- Bloodivores (Mi Liu)

2017

- Kado: The Right Answer (Shūhei Asano)
- Senki Zesshō Symphogear AXZ (Sakuya Fujitaka)
- My First Girlfriend Is a Gal (Keigo Ishida)
- Chronos Ruler (Blaze)
- Ikemen Sengoku: Toki o Kakeru ga Koi wa Hajimaranai (Sarutobi Sasuke)
- King's Game The Animation (Hideki Toyoda)

2019

- Senki Zesshō Symphogear XV (Sakuya Fujitaka)

2020

- Sakura Wars: The Animation (Valery Kaminski)
- Uzaki-chan Wants to Hang Out! (Shinichi Sakurai)
- Yatogame-chan Kansatsu Nikki 2 Satsume (Teppei)
- Boruto: Naruto Next Generations (Yoruga)

2021

- World Trigger Season 2 (Rokurō Wakamura)
- Yatogame-chan Kansatsu Nikki 3 Satsume (Teppei)
- The World's Finest Assassin Gets Reincarnated in Another World as an Aristocrat (Lugh)
- Komi Can't Communicate (Shigeo Chiarai)

2022

- Don't Hurt Me, My Healer! (Orc)
- Uzaki-chan Wants to Hang Out! ω (Shinichi Sakurai)

2023

- Summoned to Another World for a Second Time (Brad)
- Sylvanian Families Freya no Go for Dream! (Frasier Chocolate)
- The Idolmaster Million Live! (Chief Producer)
- The Apothecary Diaries (Lihaku)

2026

- A Livid Lady's Guide to Getting Even (Robert Ati)

=== Film ===
- Saint Seiya: Legend of Sanctuary (2014) (Dragon Shiryū)
- Cencoroll Connect (2019) (Gotōda)
- Toku Touken Ranbu: Hanamaru ~Setsugetsuka~ (2022) (Minamoto Kiyomaro)

=== OVA ===
- Valkyria Chronicles III (2011)

=== Video games ===
- Unchained Blades (2011) (Níðhöggr)
- Atelier Escha & Logy: Alchemists of the Dusk Sky (2013) (Awin Sidelet)
- JoJo's Bizarre Adventure: All Star Battle (2013) (Guido Mista)
- JoJo's Bizarre Adventure: Eyes of Heaven (2015) (Guido Mista)
- Yume Oukoku to Nemureru no 100 nin no ouji-sama (2015) (Lid)
- Fate/Grand Order (2015) (Kadoc Zemlupus, Watanabe no Tsuna)
- Ikémen Sengoku (2017) (Sarutobi Sasuke)
- Dragon Ball Legends (2018) (Shallot)
- Caligula Overdose (2018) (Biwasaka Eiji)
- Café Enchanté (2019) (Misyr Rex)
- World's End Club (2020) (Aniki)
- Live A Live (2022) (Akira)
- The Apothecary Diaries: The False Imperial Brother (2027) (Lihaku)

=== Tokusatsu ===
2009

- Kamen Rider × Kamen Rider W & Decade: Movie War 2010 (Skyrider, Kamen Rider Faiz)

2018

- Uchu Sentai Kyuranger vs. Space Squad (Touma Amaki/Jiraiya)

2020

- Mashin Sentai Kiramager (Mashin Mach voice)

=== Dubbing ===
- 2:37 (Theo (Xavier Samuel))
- Easy A ("Woodchuck" Todd (Penn Badgley))
