= Saint Seiya: Legend of Sanctuary =

- Theatrical release poster
- Directed by: Keiichi Sato
- Screenplay by: Tomohiro Suzuki
- Based on: Saint Seiya by Masami Kurumada
- Produced by: Yosuke Asama
- Starring: Kaito Ishikawa; Ayaka Sasaki; Kenshō Ono; Kenji Akabane; Nobuhiko Okamoto; Kenji Nojima
- Edited by: Keiichi Sato
- Music by: Yoshihiro Ike
- Production company: Toei Animation
- Distributed by: Toei Company, Ltd.
- Release dates: June 11, 2014 (Annecy); June 21, 2014 (Japan)
- Running time: 93 minutes
- Country: Japan
- Language: Japanese
- Box office: $19.7 million

Saint Seiya: Legend of Sanctuary (聖闘士星矢(セイントセイヤ) レジェンド・オブ・サンクチュアリ, Seinto Seiya Rejendo Obu Sankuchuari), is a 2014 Japanese CGI animated fantasy martial arts action film produced by Toei Animation, directed by Keiichi Sato and written by Tomohiro Suzuki. It is based on the manga Saint Seiya by Masami Kurumada. It is the sixth film based on the series. Legend of Sanctuary was released in Japan on June 21, 2014, after premiering at the Annecy International Animation Film Festival on June 11, 2014. It stars the voice talents of Kaito Ishikawa, Ayaka Sasaki, Kenshō Ono, Kenji Akabane, Nobuhiko Okamoto, and Kenji Nojima in the leading roles, and the executive producer is Masami Kurumada. The plot focuses on five young warriors known as the Bronze Saints who take on the mission of protecting Saori Kido, the reincarnation of the goddess Athena from enemies in the Sanctuary.

The film was first revealed in February 2012 by Toei Animation, and the first teaser was released on January 1, 2014. The team in charge of making the film had discussions with Kurumada to execute major changes in the characters that would be well received by modern audiences. The music of the film was composed by Yoshihiro Ike and features the theme song "Hero" by Yoshiki. At the box office, the movie grossed over $19.7 million worldwide as of March 2016.

== Plot ==
The film begins with Sagittarius Gold Saint Aiolos (Toshiyuki Morikawa) being chased by two fellow Gold Saints, Capricorn Shura (Shinji Kawada) and Gemini Saga (Kōichi Yamadera). They were sent by the Pope of Sanctuary in order to kill him for treason. Aiolos was struck down, and Saga died during the struggle. Meanwhile, in the Himalayas, Mitsumasa Kido and his butler Tatsumi explore an icy cavern. As he goes ahead, Mitsumasa discovers a baby girl and a heavily wounded Aiolos, barely clinging to life. With his last Cosmo, Aiolos shows Mitsumasa that the Pope branded Aiolos a traitor and he escaped with the baby in order to save her. The baby is the reincarnation of the goddess Athena. He also explains that in sixteen years, brave young men known as Saints will arise to protect her. Aiolos then succumbs to his wounds, leaving the Sagittarius Gold Cloth behind.

Sixteen years later, Saori Kido (Ayaka Sasaki), a beautiful young girl troubled by her mysterious powers, is being chauffeured by Tatsumi. He explains that Mitsumasa, Saori's late adoptive grandfather, kept her safe all these years and learns she is the reincarnation of the Goddess Athena and the existence of the Saints. However, they are suddenly attacked by Saints. Saori is saved by the Pegasus Bronze Saint Seiya (Kaito Ishikawa) from an assassin sent to kill her. Seiya's friends and fellow Bronze Saints Cygnus Hyōga (Kenshō Ono), Dragon Shiryū (Kenji Akabane), Andromeda Shun (Nobuhiko Okamoto), also arrive to rescue her as her protectors.

That night at the Kido Mansion, the Leo Gold Saint Aiolia (Gō Inoue), arrives to retrieve his brother's Sagittarius Cloth and kill Saori as a fake Athena. After the Bronze Saints are defeated, Tatsumi hands over the Sagittarius Cloth, but not before Saori displays her Cosmo. With newfound doubt, Aiolia leaves, asking Saori to come to Sanctuary to prove she is Athena. Upon learning of her destination from Seiya and his friends, she agrees to wage war against its Pope and travel to the Sanctuary. Before they can leave however, the Sagitta Silver Saint shoots an arrow at Saori before running away, pursued by Shiryu. However, he is ambushed and burned alive by Shun's older brother loner Phoenix Bronze Saint Ikki (Kenji Nojima) before he can report back to the Pope.

Seiya, alongside his friends arrive at the Sanctuary, heading straight towards the Aries Palace where they encounter Aries Mu (Mitsuru Miyamoto). After a brief misunderstanding, Mu allows them passage through the Palace. At the Taurus Palace, Seiya defeats Aldebaran (Rikiya Koyama) before the teenagers discover that both Aldebaran and Mu are their allies. They agree to watch over Athena while the Bronze Saints go through the rest of the Palaces.

At the Cancer Palace, Cancer Deathmask (Hiroaki Hirata) teleports Hyoga and Shiryu to the entrance to the Underworld, but Hyoga is rescued by his master, Aquarius Camus (Daisuke Namikawa), and ends up in the Aquarius Temple. There, Hyoga battles his master and is victorious, with Camus' final words being "protect Athena". Meanwhile, Seiya and Shun arrive at the Leo Palace where Aiolia attacks them mercilessly. At the entrance to the Underworld, Deathmask's Gold Cloth abandons him after it discovers his evil nature. Shiryu removes his own Cloth and successfully kills Deathmask. He is then teleported back to the Cancer Palace alongside Hyoga.

As Seiya and Shun struggle against Aiolia, the Virgo Gold Saint Shaka (Mitsuaki Madono) comes to their rescue, stopping Aiolia and allowing the Bronze Saints to continue. Once at the Scorpio Palace, Seiya and Shun are attacked by Scorpio Milo (Masumi Asano), with the battle escalating all the way to the Sagittarius Palace, with Capricorn Shura waiting for them. Back at the Cancer Palace, Saori arrives with Mu and Aldebaran and revives the unconscious Shiryu and Hyoga, even though she is weakened. While Seiya and Shun struggle with Milo and Shura, respectively, Ikki comes to Shun's rescue and engages Shura in his stead, but all three Bronze Saints are defeated. Milo then discovers Aiolos' testament, entrusting the Bronze Saints with Athena's life.

The surviving Gold Saints, alongside Hyoga, Shiryu, and Saori arrive. Shaka reveals that the Pope put Aioria under an illusion, explaining why he attacked Seiya and Shun at the Leo Temple. Shaka also reveals that the Pope is the real traitor within Sanctuary.

Saori, Shiryu, Hyoga, and Shun join their Cosmo to revive Seiya. Pisces Aphrodite (Takuya Kirimoto) speaks to the Pope about the current situation, but is killed by the Pope. Sanctuary is then attacked by the Pope who reveals himself to be Gemini Saga, who faked his death sixteen years ago. He reveals to the Saints that he tried to kill Athena all those years ago but was stopped by Aiolos. Now he plans to take control of the universe. He brings a giant statue to life and the Gold Saints join forces to destroy it, while Seiya faces Saga alone.

Seiya burns his Cosmo to reach the mythical Seventh Sense and gains the upper hand, but Saga merges himself with another giant statue and prepares to destroy Athena, everyone in Sanctuary and the Earth. Suddenly, the Sagittarius Cloth covers Seiya and he is able to rescue Saori. With Saori in his arms, Sagittarius Seiya confronts Saga one last time and saves her from Saga's curse. He shoots a powerful arrow and destroy Saga, saving Sanctuary and the Earth. Saori, now in control of Sanctuary, addresses all the Saints, thanking Seiya and his friends for rescuing her.

In a post-credits scene, Seiya, Shiryu, Hyoga, and Shun celebrate Saori's sixteenth birthday.

== Cast ==
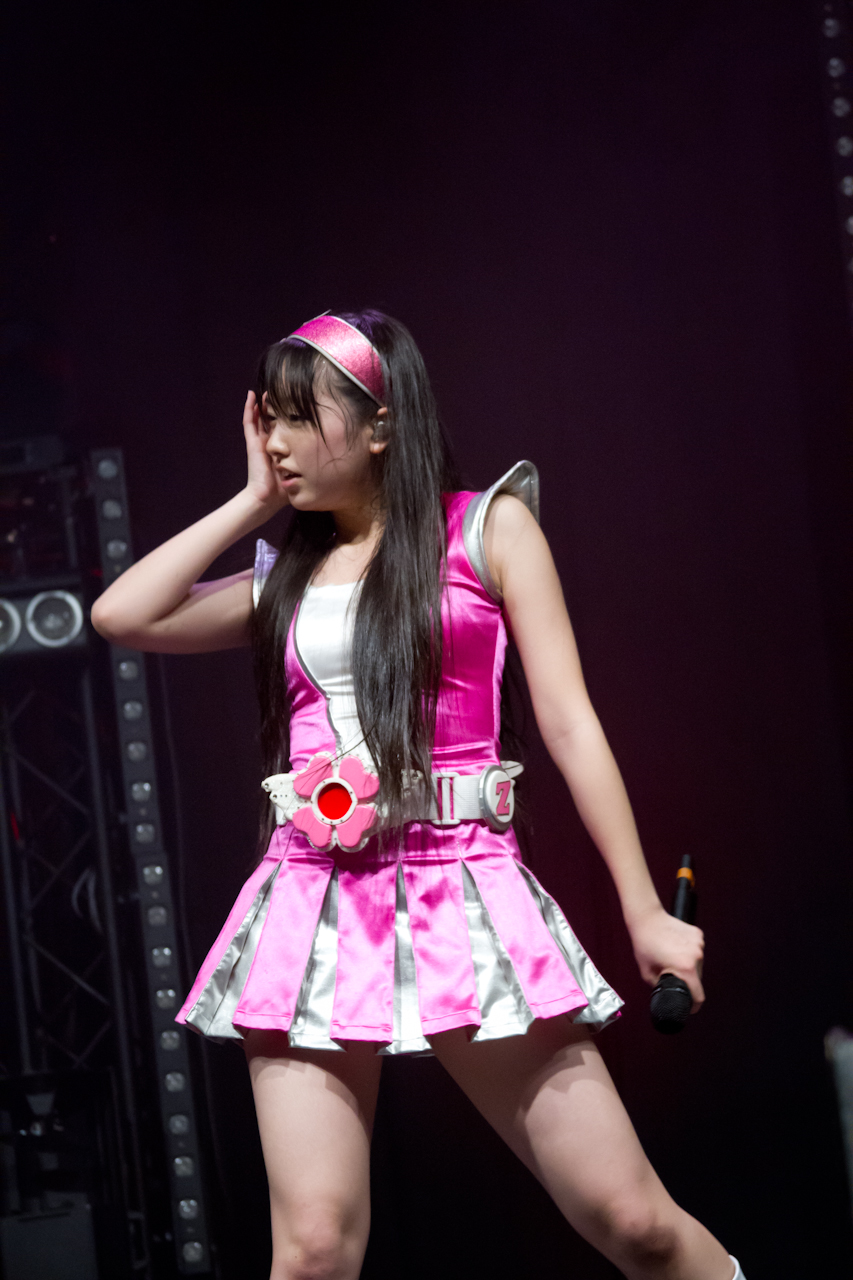
Ayaka Sasaki voices Saori.

The casting is composed of new voice actors with the previous version of Seiya having been voiced by Toru Furuya in Saint Seiya and Saint Seiya Omega and Masakazu Morita in OVAs series.

- Kaito Ishikawa as Pegasus Seiya. A Pegasus Bronze Saint, He is a strong willed young man who keeps to his faith. Ishikawa mentions being happy with the work he was assigned to.
- Ayaka Sasaki as Saori Kido. She is beautiful young woman and the reincarnation of Athena who is tossed about her origins and mission.
- Kenshō Ono as Cygnus Hyōga. Collected and unemotional, he is a passionate Cygnus Bronze Saint.
- Kenji Akabane as Dragon Shiryū. A calm and considerate Dragon Bronze Saint who is willing to risk his life for the others. Akabane considers the character both "cool" and "serious".
- Nobuhiko Okamoto as Andromeda Shun. A gentle and kind Andromeda Bronze Saint who dislikes hurting his enemies. Okamoto noted that he had to express masculinity when delivering lines.
- Kenji Nojima as Phoenix Ikki. A loner Phoenix Bronze Saint and Shun's older brother.
- Mitsuru Miyamoto as Aries Mu. The calm and realistic Aries Gold Saint who dislikes fighting.
- Rikiya Koyama as Taurus Aldebaran. The Taurus Gold Saint who is a straight talker and follows his emotions.
- Kōichi Yamadera as Gemini Saga. The Gemini Gold Saint, a man with a pure heart as well as ambition and pride.
- Hiroaki Hirata as Cancer Deathmask. The Cancer Gold Saint, a sadistic and malevolent man.
- Gō Inoue as Leo Aiolia. The Leo Gold Saint and Aioros's younger brother who is passionate for his duties.
- Mitsuaki Madono as Virgo Shaka. The Virgo Gold Saint, believed to be Buddha's reincarnation, he has deep insight. Madono feels content with the role, having been a big Saint Seiya fan.
- Masumi Asano as Scorpio Milo. The Scorpio Gold Saint, a smart woman and honored to be Saint to Athena. Asano commented she was given freedom in her portrayal of Milo.
- Toshiyuki Morikawa as Sagittarius Aiolos. The late Sagittarius Gold Saint who lost his life after being deemed traitor for taking the baby Athena away out from Sanctuary.
- Shinji Kawada as Capricorn Shura. The Capricorn Gold Saint, an aggressive man who enjoys fighting.
- Daisuke Namikawa as Aquarius Camus. The Aquarius Gold Saint and Cygnus Hyoga's master a man who while appears coldhearted, is kind.
- Takuya Kirimoto as Pisces Aphrodite. The Pisces Gold Saint, a beautiful man who uses the power of the roses to fight. Kirimoto is honored to play the character's role.

== Production ==
Development began on February 17, 2011 (12 years ago). The film is directed by Keiichi Sato and written by Tomohiro Suzuki. According to Sato, the film was developed to fit the modern times. Legend of Sanctuary is Sato's first CGI work, something which he considers a challenge. At some times the CGI Cloths were designed as if the staff was working on a video game whereas in other times they worked as a movie. Besides CGI, the characters were vaguely based on Sato's thoughts. Series creator Masami Kurumada worked as the executive producer of the film. Sato believes that by working with Kurumada they had a benefit, as their work would avoid erasing "the soul of the original manga." Sato also wanted the CGI to be able to give the protagonists facial expressions produced by their personalities.

Several changes were made from the original manga. One of the most challenging parts from the production was deciding which fights should they feature so that they could bring the best visual impact. As a result, some fights from the original series were not used such as Phoenix Ikki against Virgo Shaka which was one of the producer's favorites. The Cloths' boxes were removed in favor of small pieces of metal to generate a better impact. Another major change was the gender of the Scorpion Gold Saint, Milo, who became a female Saint. It first started as a joke but the staff became so interested in that they consulted Kurumada in order to get his approval. The change was made with the staff hoping their version of Milo would be as appealing as original.

In the making of the main cast, it was important for the staff the personality of Pegasus Seiya. Comical scenes were added to the film in order to make him appealing to the audience. Saori Kido's role was expanded in comparison to the original series so that the audience would relate themselves with her. The idea was that her character would develop across the story to become worthy of the name of Athena. On the other hand, certain issues resulted in Gemini Saga lacking his depth from the original series.

== Music ==
The music for the film is being composed by Yoshihiro Ike; the soundtrack score was released on June 18, 2014. Yoshiki of X Japan composed the film's theme song "Hero (Yoshiki Classical Version)", with Katie Fitzgerald performing vocals and Yoshiki performing on piano. Originally, Toei had problems with the music production of the film and contacted Yoshiki to have him write the movie's theme song.

Yoshiki watched the film before producing the song, remarking on its sense of amazing, grand scale; he ultimately decided to write a ballad, saying that the song "carries the hero's motif with a very beautiful melody that strikes the heart with much impact". He debuted the song during the first leg of his Yoshiki Classical World Tour. Yoshiki stated that he felt honored to play this theme as a fan of the original Saint Seiya anime.

== Previews ==
The project was first revealed in February 2012 by Toei Animation. The film was listed as the new "Masami Kurumada Project." The film's title and story were revealed in October 2013, while the first teaser appeared in December 2013 in the film's official website. Its first trailer was shown in March 2014. The website and the trailer had the following quote from Kurumada: "The Seiya legend began here." Following the announcement for the voice cast, the official site for the film was updated with a new poster visual featuring the protagonist Seiya wearing the Gold Cloth of Sagittarius, with the tagline "Burn, Cosmo." In April 2014, Comic Natalie unveiled a new "golden poster" which was displayed in 40 of JR's main railway stations throughout Japan during the Golden Week holiday. Another trailer was released in early June 2014 featuring the theme song "Hero (Yoshiki Classic Version)".

== Release ==
The film premiered in Japan on June 21, 2014. The cast members appeared at a talk event on May 31 in Tokyo, followed by similar events in Nagoya and Osaka on June 1. Another talk was held on June 19, 2014, discussing the film's production process, including character models, animation, and lighting. The film premiered at the Annecy International Animation Film Festival on June 11, 2014. The DVD was released on December 5, 2014.

To promote the movie in Japan, Lotteria restaurants added a special version of their Full Potato menu item that has a container designed to look like a Saint Seiya Cloth Box and includes a headphone jack phone strap of either Pegasus Seiya, Dragon Shiryū, Cygnus Hyōga, Andromeda Shun, or Phoenix Ikki. Customers can also enter a nationwide lottery for a limited edition Sagittarius Seiya strap, a Legend of Sanctuary poster signed by Kaito Ishikawa (voice of Seiya in the film), or a special theatrical pamphlet.

== Reception ==
Hobby Consolas gave the film an 80% score, noticing that while it retains the appeal of original series, its short length might divide viewers.

=== Box office ===
During its debut, the film has grossed ¥82 million in Japan, ranking fifth on Box Office Mojo's chart. In its second week, the film appeared eighth in the box office with ¥38 million (US$370,000). In its third week it fell to 12th earning a total of ¥24 million (US$240,000).

In Latin America, the film grossed more than $8 million from about 2 million ticket sales. In China, the film grossed CN¥37.9 million ($5.7 million) from 1,343,330 ticket sales. The film grossed a total of $19,739,114 worldwide as of March 2016.
