= Saint Seiya =

Japanese manga series

- First tankōbon volume cover, featuring Pegasus Seiya

聖闘士星矢(セイントセイヤ) (Seinto Seiya)
- Genre: Fantasy; Martial arts; Mythological
- Manga
- Written by: Masami Kurumada
- Published by: Shueisha
- English publisher: NA: Viz Media
- Imprint: Jump Comics
- Magazine: Weekly Shōnen Jump; V Jump (last chapter)
- Original run: December 3, 1985 – December 12, 1990
- Volumes: 28
- Manga

Saint Seiya: Rerise of Poseidon
- Written by: Tsunakan Suda
- Published by: Akita Shoten
- Imprint: Champion Red Comics
- Magazine: Champion Red
- Original run: September 16, 2022 – April 17, 2026
- Volumes: 4
- Manga

Saint Mariya
- Written by: Seira Shimotsuki
- Published by: Akita Shoten
- Magazine: Princess
- Original run: January 6, 2025 – present
- Volumes: 3
- Sequel manga
- Saint Seiya: Next Dimension (2006–2024); Saint Seiya: Heaven Chapter (2026–present)
- Spin-off manga
- Saint Seiya: Episode.G; Saint Seiya: The Lost Canvas; Saint Seiya: Saintia Shō; Saint Seiya: Dark Wing
- Anime series
- Saint Seiya (TV series); Saint Seiya: The Hades Chapter (OVA series); Saint Seiya Omega (TV series); Saint Seiya: Soul of Gold (ONA series); Knights of the Zodiac: Saint Seiya (ONA series)
- Films
- Saint Seiya anime films; Knights of the Zodiac
- Others
- Saint Seiya: Gigantomachia (novel series); Saint Seiya: Time Odyssey (French comic series)
- icon

Saint Seiya (Japanese: 聖闘士星矢(セイントセイヤ), Hepburn: Seinto Seiya), also known as Saint Seiya: Knights of the Zodiac or simply Knights of the Zodiac (translated from the French title Les Chevaliers du Zodiaque), is a Japanese manga series written and illustrated by Masami Kurumada. It was serialized in Shueisha's shōnen manga magazine Weekly Shōnen Jump from 1985 to 1990, with its chapters collected in 28 tankōbon volumes. In North America, the manga was licensed for English release by Viz Media.

The story follows five mystical warriors called the Saints who fight wearing sacred sets of armor named "Cloths", the designs of which derive from the various constellations the characters have adopted as their destined guardian symbols. The Saints have sworn to defend the reincarnation of the Olympian goddess Athena in her battle against other gods who want to dominate Earth.

The manga was adapted by Toei Animation into a 114-episode anime television series, broadcast on TV Asahi from 1986 to 1989. The anime series was followed by a 31-episode original video animation (OVA) series, subtitled The Hades Chapter, released from 2002 to 2008. Four animated feature films premiered in Japanese theaters from 1987 to 1989, with a fifth in 2004 and a sixth in 2014. A live-action film adaptation premiered in 2023.

The Saint Seiya manga had over 50 million copies in circulation by 2022, making it one of the best-selling manga series of all time.

A manga sequel by Kurumada, titled Saint Seiya: Next Dimension, was serialized from 2006 to 2024. A third series by Kurumada, Saint Seiya: Heaven Chapter, started in 2026. Several spin-off manga by different authors have also been created.

== Plot ==
Seiya is an orphan sent to Athena's Sanctuary in Greece to obtain a powerful armor known as a "Cloth" (聖衣(クロス), Kurosu; lit. 'Holy Cloth'). He is successful in awakening the inner source of a Saint's power, his "Cosmo" (小宇宙(コスモ), Kosumo; lit. 'Microcosm'), and returns to Japan as the Pegasus Bronze Saint to find his missing sister. The granddaughter of the man who sent him, Saori Kido, promises to locate his sister if he competes in the Galaxian Wars tournament to win the Sagittarius Gold Cloth. The event is disrupted by the vengeful Phoenix Bronze Saint, Ikki, who is defeated by Seiya and the other Bronze Saints: Shun, Shiryū, and Hyōga.

They subsequently learn that Saori is the reincarnation of the goddess Athena and that a corrupt Pope who once tried to assassinate her as an infant now rules the Sanctuary. After Saori is mortally wounded, the Bronze Saints journey to Greece to confront the Pope, battling through twelve temples, each guarded by one of the immensely powerful Gold Saints. Reaching the Pope's temple, Seiya discovers the ruler is actually Saga, the Gemini Gold Saint whose evil personality murdered the true Pope. With aid from his comrades, Seiya defeats Saga, who then commits suicide after his good nature reasserts itself and Athena is healed.

Later, the Ocean God Poseidon reincarnates within Julian Solo and floods the world. Athena and her Bronze Saints travel to his underwater temple to stop him. They discover the conflict is being manipulated by Kanon, Saga's twin brother. After a great battle, Poseidon's awakened spirit is ultimately defeated and his soul sealed away by Athena.

The final conflict begins when Hades, the Underworld God, is freed from his seal. He revives deceased Gold Saints and sends them to attack the Sanctuary. As part of her strategy, Athena sacrifices her life to travel to the Underworld directly, with her Bronze Saints following. There, Hades possesses Shun's body. Athena expels him and is taken to Elysium, where the Bronze Saints, having obtained God Cloths, battle Hades and the twin gods, Hypnos and Thanatos. They succeed in defeating the gods, though Seiya is deadly wounded to death by Hades' sword. Athena and the God Saints return to the living world with his body.

== Production ==
Manga author Masami Kurumada initially planned to create a wrestling-themed manga, preferring individual sports over team-based narratives. Inspired by The Karate Kid (1984), he first conceived a story about a young karateka named Seiya, trained by a karate master and his female assistant, but the idea was rejected by his publisher. Believing traditional martial arts like judo or karate lacked sufficient appeal, Kurumada integrated elements of Greek mythology and constellations for innovation. The core concept of Saint Seiya emerged as a nekketsu (hot-blooded) manga, distinguished by the "fashionable" Saint Cloths. Following the abrupt cancellation of his 1984 series Otoko Zaka, Kurumada sought to incorporate a unique aesthetic, differentiating it from his earlier works featuring plain high school uniforms. Though resembling medieval armor, the Cloths were primarily inspired by Hajime Sorayama's 1983 illustration book Sexy Robot. Beyond aesthetics, the armor also served a practical purpose, shielding characters during explosive combat sequences. Kurumada initially debated the armor's design, even considering Buddhist kasaya, but ultimately settled on the Greek-inspired Saint Cloths. The mythological framework was adapted from his earlier series Ring ni Kakero (1977).

During development, Kurumada initially named the protagonist Rin and titled the manga Ginga no Rin (Rin of the Galaxy). However, he later changed it to Seiya, first using kanji for "Holy Arrow" (to reflect his status as a Saint) before settling on "Star Arrow" to emphasize the celestial theme. The final title, Saint Seiya, was chosen once the Saints' concept solidified. One of Kurumada's earliest ideas was the Pegasus Meteor Fist, designed to evoke a meteor shower, aligning with the constellation motif. Despite a slow start—due to reader unfamiliarity with concepts like Cosmos and Sanctuary—the series gained popularity within six months. The term Cloth (聖衣) was derived from sacred clothing (聖なる衣), reinforcing the mythological foundation.

The God Cloths, introduced in the final arc to defeat Thanatos, were later deemed excessive by Kurumada. The nature of divine protections—such as Athena's Cloth or those of Hades and Poseidon—remained ambiguous. The Hades arc drew inspiration from Dante's Inferno, while the revival of the Gold Saints (as traitors) catered to fan demand. Aries Shion was included to establish his superiority over Cancer Deathmask and Pisces Aphrodite by mentoring Aries Mu. Key twists—such as Hyoga confronting his mentor Camus and Shun becoming Hades' vessel—were improvised, as Kurumada had not pre-planned much of the story.

Seiya's design was modeled after Ryūji Takane, the protagonist of Kurumada's earlier series Ring ni Kakero, reflecting his adherence to Osamu Tezuka's Star System (reusing character archetypes). Each main character was given distinct traits: Shiryū (righteous), Hyoga (composed), Shun (gentle), and Ikki (lone wolf). Despite the focus on the five protagonists, supporting characters often overshadowed them in popularity—a recurring trend in Kurumada's works. Although Saint Seiya concluded with the battle against Hades, Kurumada considered arcs involving Apollo and Artemis, but abandoned the idea due to workload concerns, opting instead to focus on a Ring ni Kakero sequel.

== Media ==
=== Manga ===
Written and illustrated by Masami Kurumada, Saint Seiya debuted in Shueisha's shōnen manga magazine Weekly Shōnen Jump on December 3, 1985. It finished in the magazine's 49th issue of 1990 (cover dated November 19), and the last chapter was published in the first issue of V Jump (released as an extra edition of Weekly Shōnen Jump, cover dated December 12, 1990). Shueisha collected its 110 individual chapters in 28 tankōbon volumes, released from September 10, 1986, to April 10, 1991. Shueisha has also released the series in other editions; 15 aizōban volumes, from November 20, 1995, to January 20, 1997; 15 bunkoban volumes, from January 18 to August 10, 2001; 22 kanzenban volumes, from December 2, 2005, to October 4, 2006. Akita Shoten began republishing the series in a shinsōban edition on June 8, 2021. As of September 6, 2024, thirteen volumes have been released.

In North America, the series was licensed for English release by Viz Media in 2003. Under the title Saint Seiya: Knights of the Zodiac, Viz Media released its 28 volumes from January 21, 2004, to February 2, 2010.

Kurumada started a sequel to Saint Seiya in 2006, titled Saint Seiya: Next Dimension. A prologue chapter was published in Akita Shoten's Weekly Shōnen Champion on April 27, 2006, and the series officially debuted in the magazine on August 23 of the same year. The series finished after 18 years of publication on July 4, 2024.

Kurumada published in Akita Shoten's Champion Red a series of special in-depth chapters of events from the manga; Saint Seiya: Episode Zero, from December 19, 2017, to February 19, 2018. Saint Seiya Origin, from December 19, 2018, to January 19, 2019; and Saint Seiya: Destiny, on December 19, 2018. The three chapters of Episode Zero were included in the first volume of the series' shinsōban edition.

A sequel to Next Dimension, titled Saint Seiya: Heaven Chapter (聖闘士星矢(セイントセイヤ) 天界篇, Seinto Seiya Tenkai-hen), started in Weekly Shōnen Champion on May 14, 2026.

==== Spin-offs ====
A spin-off series by Megumu Okada, titled Saint Seiya Episode.G, was serialized in Akita Shoten's Champion Red from December 19, 2002, to June 19, 2013.

A second spin-off series by Shiori Teshirogi, titled Saint Seiya: The Lost Canvas, was serialized in Weekly Shōnen Champion from August 24, 2006, to April 7, 2011.

A third spin-off series by Chimaki Kuori Saint Seiya: Saintia Shō, was serialized in Champion Red from August 19, 2013, to July 19, 2021.

A fourth spin-off series by Kenji Saito and Shinshu Ueda, titled Saint Seiya: Dark Wing (聖闘士星矢(セイントセイヤ)・冥王異伝 ダークウィング, Seinto Seiya Meiō Iden: Dāku Wingu; lit. 'Saint Seiya: An Alternate Tale of the Underworld Emperor – Dark Wing'), started in Champion Red on December 19, 2020.

A fifth spin-off series by Tsunakan Suda, titled Saint Seiya: Rerise of Poseidon (聖闘士星矢(セイントセイヤ)・海皇再起, Seinto Seiya: Kaiō Saiki; lit. 'Saint Seiya: The Return of the Sea Emperor'), was serialized in Champion Red from September 16, 2022, to April 17, 2026. Its chapters were collected in four volumes, released from October 19, 2023, to June 19, 2026.

A sixth spin-off series by Seira Shimotsuki, titled Saint Mariya (聖闘士真理矢(セイント マリヤ))), started in Akita Shoten's shōjo manga magazine Princess on January 6, 2025. The first volume was released on June 16, 2025. As of June 19, 2026, three volumes have been released.

=== Other print media ===
Three Saint Seiya Anime Special mooks, published by Shueisha under its Jump Gold Selection imprint, were released from July 13, 1988, to April 19, 1989. A databook, titled Saint Seiya Taizen (聖闘士星矢 大全; "Saint Seiya Compendium"), was released by Shueisha on August 17, 2001.

A series of two novels by Tatsuya Hamazaki, Saint Seiya: Gigantomachia, were published by Shueisha under its Jump J-Books imprint. The first novel was released on August 23, 2002, and the second on December 16 of that same year.

Saint Seiya 30 Shūnen Kinen Gashū Seiiki – Sanctuary (聖闘士星矢 30周年記念画集 聖域 ―SANCTUARY―), an art book which contains over 90 illustrations by Masami Kurumada, was launched by Takarajimasha on October 21, 2016.

=== Anime ===
==== Television series ====
A 114-episode anime television series adaptation produced by Toei Animation was broadcast on TV Asahi from October 11, 1986, to April 1, 1989.

==== Films ====
Four animated feature films were released in Japanese theaters from 1987 to 1989. A fifth film, Heaven Chapter – Overture (天界編 序奏, Tenkai Hen Josō), followed in 2004, intended as a prologue to a new story arc set after the manga's conclusion. Initially announced as the start of a new series, creator Masami Kurumada later stated it was planned as part of a trilogy, with Pegasus Seiya eventually facing Zeus and Chronos. Despite the first film's 1987 release, none received an official North American release until Discotek Media acquired the home video rights to the first four films in 2012, releasing them subtitled across two DVDs. On June 21, 2014, the CGI film Legend of Sanctuary was released to celebrate the franchise's 25th anniversary.

==== Original video animations ====
The final story arc of the original manga was adapted into an original video animation (OVA) series subtitled The Hades Chapter (冥王ハーデス編, Meiō Hādesu-hen), released in three parts.

The first part, Sanctuary (十二宮編, Jūnikyū-hen), consists of 13 episodes. It was first broadcast on SKY PerfecTV! from November 9, 2002, to April 12, 2003, and released on seven DVDs by Bandai Visual from January 25 to July 25, 2003.

The second part, Inferno (冥界編, Meikai-hen), consists of 12 episodes and introduced a recast for the main characters. Its first six episodes aired on SKY PerfecTV! from December 17, 2005, to February 18, 2006, and were released on three DVDs by Avex from February 22 to April 26, 2006. The latter six episodes aired on Perfect Choice from December 15, 2006, to February 18, 2007, and were released on three DVDs from January 31 to March 28, 2007.

The final part, Elysion (エリシオン編, Erishion-hen), consists of six episodes. It premiered on Perfect Choice from March 7 to August 1, 2008, and was released on three DVDs from March 28 to August 22, 2008.

==== Original net animations ====
An original net animation (ONA) series titled Saint Seiya: Soul of Gold began streaming in 2015.

Another ONA series, Knights of the Zodiac: Saint Seiya, premiered on Netflix, with six episodes, on July 19, 2019. Another six episodes premiered on January 23, 2020. The second season premiered on Crunchyroll on July 31, 2022.

=== Live-action film ===
In a 2003 interview with the French magazine AnimeLand, author Masami Kurumada revealed that a Hollywood studio had approached him years earlier with a fifteen-minute pilot for a live-action Saint Seiya film. Kurumada rejected the project, feeling it failed to preserve the essence of the series. A 2005 follow-up interview reported that the pilot had altered the main characters' names and changed Andromeda Shun from male to female.

In 2017, Toei Animation and Hong Kong-based A Really Good Film Company announced a collaboration to produce a live-action film. Polish director Tomasz Bagiński was attached to direct an adaptation of the 1986 series, initially slated for a 2019 release. Titled Knights of the Zodiac, the film stars Mackenyu as Seiya, Madison Iseman as Sienna, Sean Bean as Alman Kido, Diego Tinoco as Nero, Famke Janssen as Vander Guraad, Nick Stahl as Cassios, and Mark Dacascos as Mylock. It premiered in Japan on April 28, 2023, with Sony Pictures handling distribution outside Japan, excluding China and the Middle East.

=== Stage plays ===
In August 1991, a musical, sponsored by Bandai, was performed at the Aoyama theater in Tokyo, Japan. The story retells the Sanctuary and Poseidon chapters. The cast included members of SMAP as the five Bronze Saints and Poseidon. The characters Aries Mu, Leo Aiolia, and Scorpio Milo were portrayed by members of another band, Tokio.

A stage play adaptation of the first Saint Seiya film, Evil Goddess Eris, ran at Shibuya's Space Zero theater from July 28–31, 2011.

=== Video games ===
Several video games have been released based on the series.

=== Other media ===
In the early 1990s, Renaissance-Atlantic Entertainment planned to produce an American animated version of the series titled Guardians of the Cosmos. Only a pilot was made, and the intro was revealed at the end of YouTuber Ray Mona's documentary on the subject titled The Secret Stories of Saint Seiya in December 2022. The full pilot was showcased in the follow-up documentary The Secret Stories of Saint Seiya Part 2 in April 2023. In September 2024, Marshall uploaded to her channel the pilot episode of StarStorm, a proposed live-action adaptation of Saint Seiya made in the 1990s.

An exhibition was held in Akihabara in June 2016 to celebrate the manga's 30th anniversary, with numerous commemorative gadgets on sale; a second exhibition was held in Hong Kong in August of that same year; a third exhibition was held in China (Shanghai) from December 2017 to March 2018.

== Reception ==
The Saint Seiya manga has sold over 25 million copies in Japan by 2007. It had over 35 million copies in circulation by 2017, and over 50 million copies in circulation by 2022.

Jason Thompson characterized the series as being primarily combat-oriented. He noted that this emphasis stemmed from creator Kurumada's genuine passion for the foundational elements of the battle shōnen genre, which included themes of friendship and emotional sacrifice, all presented through a distinctive visual style of dynamic action and dramatic impact. In Blood, Biceps, and Beautiful Eyes: Cultural Representations of Masculinity in Masami Kurumada's Saint Seiya, Lorna Piatti-Farnell noted that the masculinity to which Seiya, Shun, Hyoga and Shiryu subscribed—one centered on the achievement of just goals—was consistent with the narrative patterns frequently found in Weekly Shōnen Jump manga.

The term "yaoi" was popularized in 1987 by doujinshi based on the series. Its large, predominantly male cast facilitated "an incredible number" of pairings, making it a particularly popular subject for yaoi works. Andromeda Shun was among the more frequently featured characters in these pairings.

Manga artist Tite Kubo cited Saint Seiya as a major inspiration for the weapon designs and battle sequences in his own series, Bleach.
