= Cygnus Hyoga =

Fictional character from Saint Seiya

- Saint Seiya character
- Cygnus Hyoga as illustrated by Masami Kurumada
- First appearance: Manga; Saint Seiya Chapter 4: "Galaxian War" (1986 – shadowed); Chapter 5: "Cygnus, The Ice Saint" (1986 – fully); Anime; Saint Seiya; Episode 2 (October 18, 1986 – image); Episode 3 (October 25, 1986 – fully)
- Created by: Masami Kurumada
- Voiced by: Japanese; Kōichi Hashimoto (anime); Yumi Tōma (child); Hiroaki Miura (Hades OVAs and Knights of the Zodiac); Fumiko Inoue (Hades OVAs, child); Mamoru Miyano (Omega); Kenshō Ono (Legend of Sanctuary); English; Stuart Stone (DiC dub); Jason Douglas (ADV dub); Christine Auten (ADV dub, child); Patrick Poole (Netflix dub)

In-universe information
- Weapon: Body armor Round shield
- Relatives: Natasha (mother); Mitsumasa Kido (father, manga only)
- Affiliations: Bronze Saints
- Birthplace: Original series: East Siberia, URSS; 2019 remake: Oymyakon, Sakha, Russia
- Abilities: Super strength Super speed, agility, reflexes Stamina; Healing; Flight; Energy projection Energy absorption Durability; Energy sensing Dimensional travel Cryogenesis/cryokinesis; Ice control/manipulation Ice generation Snow control/manipulation Snow generation Snow/ice magic Cryokinetic constructs Blizzard creation Snowstorm creation
- Alternative names: Cygnus Magnus; Swan Hyoga

Cygnus Hyoga (白鳥星座の氷河, Kigunasu no Hyōga; Hyōga meaning "glacier") is a main character in the manga series Saint Seiya, created by Masami Kurumada and later adapted to anime. Hyoga is cold and calm by nature, which complements his abilities as a saint. He was the third of the five main protagonists to be introduced. In some English adaptations, he was named Swan Hyoga.

One of the protagonists and the Bronze Saint of Cygnus, Hyoga was trained by the Crystal Saint, under who he learned to manipulate ice. Following his master's teachings, he tries to remain rational in the face of everything, but has an emotional side that he cannot let go of.

== Character outline ==
One of the main characters in the series, Hyoga appears calm, collected, and unemotional. Beneath the surface, however, he is passionate and devoted to his ideals. As a Saint born under the Cygnus constellation, Hyoga is able to control and manipulate ice and snow. Having mastered the basis of the technique used by the Saints of ice, he is able to use the power of his Cosmos to create ice and snow by stopping subatomic particles.

== Abilities ==
As a Saint, Hyoga has been trained in mind and body to learn how to use the power of the Cosmos within his own body and use it for super strength, speed, agility, durability and reflexes. The constellation he uses for extra power is that of the Cygnus constellation, also known as Swan; by channeling his Cosmos into the Cygnus constellation using the Cloth armor it is based on, he is able to strengthen himself by combining his Cosmos with that of the constellation's Cosmos. He can use his Cosmos to attack with cosmic energy blasts and ice and snow, as well as heal himself and sense other people with their own Cosmos. After he and his fellow Bronze Saints obtained the blood of the gold Saints to repair their Cloths when they were damaged, they acquired more power and upgraded Cloths in the process. The same is true for the God Cloth after their Cloths were blessed by Saori, also known as Athena, using her own blood.

== Role in the series ==
In the manga, Hyoga originally did not choose to participate in the Galaxian Wars until he received an order from Sanctuary to assassinate the other Bronze Saints. He originally accepted this due to his hatred for the Graude Foundation, being aware that Mitsumasa Kido was his father. As he became more familiar with his subjects, however, Hyoga grew indecisive about his mission, ultimately dropping his allegiance to Sanctuary after the Silver Saints began to target him along with the other Bronze Saints. His rage towards Sanctuary boiled after his master Camus visited Siberia to sink the shipwreck that his mother Natasha had died on into the ocean. Hyoga competes with the same motivation as the other Bronze Saints—to win the Gold Cloth of Sagittarius.

During the battle with Phoenix Ikki, his tender side was revealed and he slowly began to display his true personality. In the Sanctuary arc, Hyoga became close to Andromeda Shun after Shun selflessly attempted to revive his Cosmos from death, constantly referring to how he owed Shun his life. In the Hades arc, Hyoga paired with Dragon Shiryu as the Saints of Athena waged war against the Underworld, protecting Seiya and Shun from the judge Minos and later facing Thanatos and Hypnos in Elysium. During these battles, the Cygnus Cloth becomes a stronger God Cloth and Hyoga lends his Cosmos to Athena to kill Hades. In vol.13, the sidestory Koori no Kuni no Natasha Hen (Chapter of Natasha, from the Land of Ice) follows Hyoga as he meets soldiers known as Blue Soldiers and saves a woman who had been frozen.

== Reception ==
Critical reception to Hyoga has been mixed. Kenshō Ono describes the character as "collected and unemotional". Jason Thompson of Anime News Network found Hyoga's fight against the Black Cygnus too violent for the demographic's standards, especially when the Black Saint removes one of his own eyes. DVDTalk noted that, while fans might look forward to Hyoga and Shiryu's screentime in the anime, he felt the series was poorly written, to the point he felt the Bronze Saints' personalities change too often in the same ways as the villains. DVDVisionJapan similarly found Hyoga's first fight brutal due to how Hydra Saint repeatedly punches Hyoga in the face, to the point that Hyoga's blood falls outside the arena and reaches Seiya's face. Chris Beveridge from AnimeOnDVD joked how one of the anime's episode titles, "Farewell Hyoga – Rest In Peace", spoils Hyoga's possible death in the Sanctuary arc. His fight against Camus was noted to be most interesting from the DVD reviewed, as Hyoga has to clash with his two masters. Nevertheless, he found Hyoga's episodes fun to watch. Hyoga's "Diamond Dust" technique was criticized by the FandomPost for being overused in battles, to the point it appears the writer suffered writer's block. Despite this in "Blood, Biceps, and Beautiful Eyes: Cultural Representations of Masculinity in Masami Kurumada's Saint Seiya", author Lorna Piatti-Farnell notes that the masculinity Seiya, Shun, Hyoga, and Shiryu bow to involves accomplishments of their goals of justice might not come as a surprise, as the magazine Shonen Jump often has manga that involves this predicaments. IGN praised him as one of the most charismatic main characters of the series, stating that, despite his calm demeanor, Hyoga carries an Oedipus complex as a result of losing his mother when he was a child.

Video game journalist Drew Mackie in an article for his website Thrilling Tales of Old Video Games drew a parallel between Remy and Final Fantasy VII character Vincent Valentine, in that both characters had someone they cared about hidden in a submerged cave. He suggested the both concepts may be a homage Hyoga's relationship with his mother. In the series, his mother's body is lost at sea and becomes frozen at the bottom of the ocean, with Hyoga training his body to reach her preserved corpse. Hyoga's fixation his mother comes across as oedipal, and in this way he pointed out how both characters have an illicit undertone with their own lovers, complete with a resolution of letting them go to achieve greater power.

Hyoga's role in other films and series have been the subject of discussion. In regards to the Netflix series, HobbyConsolas felt Hyoga's backstory was well written despite some issues with the narrative. While liking Legend of the Sanctuary's themes, the same site was surprised by the handling of Hyoga, who appears driving a bike. In a review of Legend of Sanctuary, Screen praised the homage to Hyoga's techniques and noted the older fans glorified his battle with Camus. In Japan, Hyoga is a popular character, ranking at 2nd in the main character polls of the Bronze Saints.
