= Andromeda Shun =

- Saint Seiya character
- Shun illustrated by Masami Kurumada
- First appearance: Manga; Saint Seiya Chapter 4: "Galaxian War" (1986); Anime; Saint Seiya; Episode 2 October 18, 1986
- Created by: Masami Kurumada
- Voiced by: Japanese; Ryō Horikawa (anime); Yumi Tōma (child); Yūta Kasuya (Hades OVAs); Endo Tomoka (child OVAs); Hiroshi Kamiya (Omega); Nobuhiko Okamoto (Legend of Sanctuary); Satomi Satou (Knights of the Zodiac); English; Andrew Sabiston (DiC dub); Chris Patton (ADV dub); Kira Vincent Davis (child, ADV dub); Luci Christian (Knights of the Zodiac); Blake Jackson (Sentai Filmworks dub/Netflix dub)

In-universe information
- Weapon: Body armor Chain weapons
- Relatives: Phoenix Ikki (older brother)
- Affiliations: Bronze Saints
- Gender: Male; Female (2019 remake)
- Birthplace: Original series: Japan; 2019 remake: Borkum, Germany
- Abilities: Super strength Super speed, agility, reflexes Stamina; Healing; Flight; Energy sensing Energy projection Energy absorption Durability
- Alternative names: Andromeda Shaun

Andromeda Shun (Japanese: アンドロメダ星座の瞬, Hepburn: Andoromeda no Shun) is a protagonist in the Saint Seiya media franchise, which originated in the manga of the same name, written and illustrated by Masami Kurumada, that subsequently inspired an anime series, soundtracks, OVAs, films, video games, and other collectibles. He is one of the strongest characters in the series, although his gentle disposition and kind nature tend to hold him back from using his full power until he has no other choice but to do so. Shun is also the younger brother of Phoenix Ikki, a fellow and loner Bronze Saint.

Shun is a pacifist, and the most reluctant of the Bronze Saints when a situation must be resolved by violence. He is a merciful soul by nature, and a firm believer in solving problems without causing bloodshed. This creates a sharp contrast between himself and the rest of the Saints: whereas the others will not hesitate to battle when the situation demands it, Shun only allows himself to fight if it is an absolute necessity, or when his almost endless patience wears out. When this is the case, Shun can become an extremely skilled and deadly fighter.

== Character outline ==
=== Personality ===
Shun is the Bronze Saint of the Andromeda constellation. He is a merciful and gentle soul by nature and a firm believer in solving problems without bloodshed. This attitude separates him from the rest of the Saints: whereas they will not hesitate to battle when the situation demands it, Shun only allows himself to fight if it is an absolute necessity or if his almost endless patience wears out. In such cases, Shun can become an extremely skilled and deadly fighter.

Shun is portrayed as being weak in the first four Saint Seiya films and in the anime-only Asgard arc. Almost every fight scene culminates with his almost defeat and subsequent rescue by his brother Ikki. In the original manga, however, Shun is shown as a formidable, if unwilling, fighter and opponent.

== Abilities ==
As a Saint, Shun has been trained in mind and body to learn how to use the power of the Cosmos within his own body and use it for super strength, speed, agility, durability and reflexes. The constellation he uses for extra power is that of Andromeda; by channeling his Cosmos into the Andromeda constellation using the Cloth armor it is based on, he is able to strengthen himself by combining his Cosmos with the constellation's Cosmos. He can use his Cosmos to attack with cosmic energy blasts and channel the Cosmos through his Cloth armor's chain, which can use electricity to shock opponents. He can also heal himself and sense other people with their own Cosmos. After he and his fellow Bronze Saints obtained the blood of the Gold Saints to repair their Cloths when they were damaged, they acquired more power and upgraded Cloths in the process. The same is true for the God Cloth after their Cloths were blessed by Saori, also known as Athena, using her own blood. Shun is the bearer of the Cloth, which represents the constellation Andromeda, associated to Princess Andromeda, who was chained to be sacrificed to the monster Cetus in Greek mythology. The Cloth possesses chains that are said to be the same used to tie Princess Andromeda in the legend. Additionally, the chains are related to the Andromeda Galaxy, believed to be a nebula back in the 1980s when the manga was created, hence the names for his techniques. These chains are legendary for their durability and defensive nature and renowned for their great apparent length, as they can extend enough to reach light years away, penetrating the very fabric of space. When there is a threat, the chains can give out warning signs and become charged with enough electricity to release shocks of at least 10,000 volts. Shun normally relies on the Andromeda Chains to fight as an accessory, as he does not want to use his full power to avoid killing opponents.

During the Sanctuary arc of the manga, Shun awakens the seventh sense, the essence of Cosmo. Having been born under the sign of Virgo, Shun also dons the Virgo Gold Cloth during the Hades arc, in the battle against the God of Death Thanatos. After the Gold Cloths are destroyed, however, Shun manages to achieve his Andromeda God Cloth.

== Appearances ==
=== Saint Seiya ===
In the Galaxion War story arc of the Sanctuary Saga, Shun competes in the Galaxian Tournament to hopefully meet up with his older brother, Phoenix Ikki. He succeeds in his battle with Unicorn Jabu, eliminating him from the tournament. Eventually, the tournament is interrupted by Ikki, who, cold hearted from his experiences on Death Queen Island, steals the Gold Sagittarius Cloth for his own uses. The protagonists, including Shun, pursue him to retrieve it.

In the Sanctuary arc, at the battles of the Twelve Temples, Shun holds his own against Gemini Saga and manages to kill Pisces Aphrodite. In the Poseidon arc, he defeats the Mariner Generals Scylla Io, of the South Pacific Ocean, and Siren Sorrento, of the South Atlantic.

In the Hades arc, he manages to dispatch various opponents before it is revealed that he is the chosen human vessel of Hades, God of the Underworld. Although Shun himself is initially unaware of this, the soul of Hades possesses Shun's body during the close encounter in Hades' throne room after the death of Lyra Orphée. Not long after, the recently reincarnated Hades is confronted by Ikki. Shun regains enough control of his body to strangle himself with one hand, urging Ikki to take the opportunity to destroy him. However, Ikki's hesitation allows Hades to take back control of Shun and defeat Ikki. It takes the blood of Athena and the Goddess's encouragement to give Shun the strength to separate Hades from his body once and for all. When Shun awakens in Seiya's arms moments later, he once again dons the Andromeda Cloth and follows his fellow Bronze Saints to the Wailing Wall and then Elysion. There, they help Athena fight Hades in his true body and successfully defeat him.

=== Saint Seiya: Next Dimension ===
Shun reappears in Saint Seiya: Next Dimension, the canonical sequel to the original Saint Seiya manga, also written and illustrated by Masami Kurumada. In Next Dimension, Shun is the first Bronze Saint to return to Athena's side after the death of Hades and joins her in her quest to find a way to save Pegasus Seiya's life from Hades's curse. He escorts her to Olympus to meet her elder sister Artemis, protecting Athena from the threat of Artemis's Satellites. They eventually meet with the God of Time Chronos and travel back in time to 18th-century war against Hades. In the process, Shun is separated from Athena and lands in the coliseum of Sanctuary, attracting the attention of several foot soldiers and Pegasus Tenma. He quickly dispatches the soldiers and fights with Tenma, with the fight ending after he manages to convince Tenma that he is a Saint from the future. They join forces to climb up the Twelve Temples and reach Athena, and Shun is proclaimed as the future Gold Saint of Virgo successor to Virgo Shaka.

=== Saint Seiya Omega ===
Shun also reappears in the non-canonical Saint Seiya Omega, an unofficial sequel to the main series, coming to the aid of the new group of Bronze Saints. Shun reveals that, during the last battle of the 20th-century Saints against the evil god Mars, a mysterious rock fell from the sky, boosting the Cosmos of every Saint and God and granting them new elemental powers. As such, Mars gained the elemental power of darkness, used to deal Shun a "dark wound" that spread across his left arm. Unable to heal himself and prevented from using his Cosmos again, he retired as Saint and became a wandering doctor. In this facility, he cured the wounded Dragon Ryūhō, son of his old friend Shiryu, and helped Pegasus Kōga, recognizing the courage of the late Pegasus Seiya, against Hound Miguel, one of the servants of Mars. However, forced to burn his Cosmos again, Shun, overcome by darkness, almost completely lost the use of his left arm. He decided to devote himself to his new life as a physician, entrusting Athena's safety to the 21st-century Saints.

Despite his meek, cheerful disposition, Andromeda Shun is regarded as one of the strongest Saints of the 20th century. When Hound Miguel faces him the first time, without knowing about his diminished strength, he escapes in fear, leaving a wounded Kōga behind. Furthermore, Kōga and Ryūhō express amazement at his diminished strength, claiming to know about his past deeds.

=== Knights of the Zodiac: Saint Seiya ===
Shun appears in the 2019 original Netflix anime Knights of the Zodiac: Saint Seiya. The character is now female and known as Shaun.

== Reception ==
In a poll presented in volume 3, Shun came in as the third most favorite of the Bronze Saint protagonists. He is seen as the character with the most potential for yaoi out of the five principal Bronze Saints. Regarded as a "true walking caricature, this character was the most fragile and sensible, with fine traits, long hair, doe eyes and the most feminine armor of the group (with a nice 95B in the guise of a breastplate in the anime version)". His chains are regarded as highly symbolic, viewed as a jewel (a feminine symbol) and a weapon of changing length that can become supple or rigid at will (a phallic symbol), which can be used for defensive or offensive purposes (the sexual ambiguity and seme-uke dichotomy), and represents the original myth of Andromeda, who was tied on a rock and offered as a sacrifice to calm a marine monster's wrath, which is regarded as sexual. In the section "Right Turn Only!" from Anime News Network, writer Liann Cooper described Shun's character as "prissy" and his fight against his older brother, Phoenix Ikki, as a plot twist "skirmish". IGN felt that, because of his caring nature, Shun is often in danger, resulting in Ikki coming to his aid. In a review of the anime, Chris Beveridge from AnimeOnDVD praised the fight between Shun and Gemini Saga due to the power the Bronze Saint shows to take down his enemy.

Lorna Piatti-Farnell in The Journal of Popular Culture noted that, despite the character's androgynous appearance, the series never challenges his masculinity due to the way the Japanese culture accepts it.

The writer of the Netflix series, Eugene Son, justified Shun's gender change after thinking the Knights needed more female representation. He explained that, while the original show had some excellent core concepts, the one thing that bothered him about it was that "the Bronze Knights with Pegasus Seiya are all dudes". However, this decision received backlash from fans of the original series. The gender swap of Shun, who was the only main male character of the original series who did not fit in the stereotype of the male hero – slightly effeminate, sensitive and opposed to fighting – was seen as reinforcing gender stereotypes.
