= Dragon Shiryū =

Shiryū
- Saint Seiya character
- Dragon Shiryū as illustrated by Masami Kurumada
- First appearance: Manga; Saint Seiya Chapter 4: "Galaxian War" (1986); Anime; Saint Seiya; Episode 2 October 18, 1986
- Created by: Masami Kurumada
- Voiced by: Japanese; Hirotaka Suzuoki (anime); Chiyoko Kawashima (child); Takahiro Sakurai (Hades OVAs and Knights of the Zodiac); Ken Narita (Omega); Kenji Akabane (Legend of Sanctuary); English; Jerry Houser (Guardians of the Cosmos); Dan Warry-Smith (DiC dub); Jay Hickman (ADV dub); Luci Christian (ADV dub, child); Blake Shepard (Knights of the Zodiac/Netflix dub)

In-universe information
- Weapon: Body armor Gauntlet; Round shield
- Relatives: Chunli (wife, Omega only); Shoryu (adoptive son); Ryūhō (son, Omega only)
- Affiliations: Bronze Saints
- Birthplace: Original series: Japan; 2019 remake: Chinatown, San Francisco, California, U.S.
- Abilities: Super strength Super speed, agility, reflexes Stamina; Healing; Flight; Energy sensing Energy projection Energy absorption Durability; Dimensional travel
- Alternative names: Dragon Long

Dragon Shiryū (Japanese: 龍星座(ドラゴン)の紫龍, Hepburn: Doragon no Shiryū) is a fictional character from the Saint Seiya universe created by Masami Kurumada. As one of the protagonists of the media franchise, he has made appearances in the several manga, the original anime adaptation, OVAs, films and video games. He has also inspired a large number of collectibles. Considered the most mature and wisest of the five heroes, Shiryū is the Bronze Saint of the Dragon constellation, whose Cloth possesses legendary defensive and offensive properties. Shiryū is one of the ten surviving orphans trained to become Athena's Saints by Mitsumasa Kido. With Kido dead, Shiryū and his allies become the protectors of his adopted granddaughter, Saori, Athena's reincarnation.

== Character outline ==
Out of the five main characters from Saint Seiya, Shiryū is the calmest and most collected. He greatly respects his master Libra Dohko, from whom he learned not only how to use his Cosmo to fight, but also fundamental wisdom for life. He trained at Lushan for six years under his tutelage, during which time he befriended the old master's protégé Chunli.

In addition to possessing great physical strength, Shiryū owns one of the most durable Bronze Cloths. Having spent the last two and a half centuries under the mineral-rich waterfall of Lushan, it is harder than diamonds. It is also legendary for the shield on its left arm and its right gauntlet, endowed with powerful piercing capabilities, which have earned the Cloth its nickname as "the strongest fist and shield". In times of extreme need, the five main Bronze Saints are also allowed to temporarily wear Gold Cloths. In the Sanctuary arc, Shiryū used the weapons of the Libra Gold Cloth to free Cygnus Hyōga from Aquarius Camus's ice coffin. In the battles against Poseidon and Thanatos, he wore the Libra Cloth.

Shiryū sports the image of a green and white dragon on his back, which is connected to his guardian constellation and only appears as his Cosmo is rising. Whenever his life is in danger, the image begins to fade. Once it completely vanishes, it is a sign that Shiryū's Cosmo has reached zero and he is dead.

== Abilities ==
As a Saint, Shiryu has been trained in mind and body to learn how to use the power of the Cosmos within his own body and use it for super strength, speed, agility, durability and reflexes. The constellation he uses for extra power is that of the Draco constellation, also known as Dragon; by channeling his Cosmos into the Dragon constellation using the Cloth armor it is based on, he is able to strengthen himself by combining his Cosmos with the constellation's Cosmos. He can use his Cosmos to attack with cosmic energy blasts, as well as heal himself and sense other people with their own Cosmos. After he and his fellow Bronze Saints obtained the blood of the Gold Saints to repair their Cloths when they were damaged, they acquired more power and upgraded Cloths in the process. The same is true for the God Cloth after their Cloths were blessed by Saori, also known as Athena, using her own blood.

== Appearances ==
=== Saint Seiya ===
Six years after the Graude Foundation sends Shiryū to train at Lushan's Five Old Peaks (廬山五老峰, Rozan Gorōhō) in China, he obtains the Bronze Cloth of the Dragon constellation from Libra Dohko. He then returns to Japan to participate in the Galaxian Wars Tournament, in which he is narrowly defeated by Seiya. When Phoenix Ikki steals the Gold Cloth, Shiryū becomes involved in the battles to recover it from the Black Saints and eventually discovers that Saori Kido is the Goddess Athena, whom he swore to protect. In the following battles against the Silver Saints, Shiryū is forced to blind himself to achieve victory against Perseus Algol. His injury does not keep him from battle, and he joins his fellow Bronze Saints as they go to Sanctuary to depose the false Pope, Gemini Saga. He recovers his sight upon awakening his Seventh Sense in the fight against Cancer Deathmask.

In the Poseidon arc, he confronts the General Chrysaor Krishna. Having been repaired with the blood of the Gold Saints after the battles of the Twelve Temples, the Dragon New Cloth becomes gold whenever Shiryū uses his Cosmo to the maximum and awakens his seventh sense. However, even this added protection is unable to prevent Shiryū from losing his eyesight a second time to Krishna's overwhelming attacks. In the end, he manages to cut through the General's chakras and defeat him, then destroys the Pillar guarded by Krishna and joins Seiya to free Athena and reseal Poseidon.

During the Hades arc, Shiryū defeats several Specters and awakens his eighth sense to recover his sight. His Damaged Cloth is endowed into Final Cloth with the power of Athena's divine blood by Aries Shion, which enables him to travel to Elysion and deliver Athena's divine Cloth to her. After a confrontation with the twin gods Hypnos and Thanatos, he awakens the Dragon God Cloth and successfully helps Athena defeat Hades.

=== Saint Seiya: Next Dimension ===
In Next Dimension, the official sequel to the Saint Seiya manga, Shiryu and Chunli have adopted a baby, whom they named Shoryu. Along with Hyoga, he travels back in time to the previous Holy War against Hades in the eighteenth century in order to help Saori / Athena save the life of Seiya, who is cursed by Hades' sword. Shiryu is proclaimed as the future Gold Saint of Libra successor to Dohko, from the Gold Saint of the eighteenth century Libra Dohko (Young).

=== Saint Seiya Omega ===
In the original series Saint Seiya Omega, Shiryū is still alive well after the events of the Hades arc in the anime series. According to the Saint Seiya Omega history, Shiryū returned to Lushan, where he married his love interest Chunli and had a son, Ryūhō. Due to an unspecified accident, however, Shiryū lost his five senses and was forced to step down as a Saint, bequeathing his armor, duties and obligations to his son.

Following the defeat of the God of Darkness Abzu, Shiryū's senses are restored, but he insists that Ryūhō must continue his duty as the next Dragon Saint. During the war against the Pallasites, Shiryū joins the assault on the enemy stronghold donning the Libra Cloth, which he inherited from the previous Libra Golden Saint, Genbu.

=== Other appearances ===
Shiryu has also appeared in multiple spinoffs from the series, including its films and novels such as the Gigantomachia.

== Reception ==
In Japan, Shiryū is the most popular of the Saint Seiya protagonists, ranking first in the main characters poll of the five Bronze Saints. The Journal of Popular Culture noted the use of Shiryu's techniques where a dragon is seen alongside his fists as one of Kurumada's most striking illustrations in the Saint Seiya manga due to the style the impact has. Additionally, when Shiryu faces Cancer Deathmask, the writer addressed that Kurumada's message as seen through this fight scene is that people should still embrace violence based on what the aggressor has done, with Deathmask having attacked the innocent Chunli. Kenji Akabane considers the character both "cool" and "serious". Singer Shoko Nakawgawa considers Shiryu her favorite character from the series thanks to the sex appeal provided whenever Shiryu loses his protection in battle and his willingness to remove his eyesight to protect his friends.

DVDVisionJapan praised Hirotaka Suzuoki's work for making Shiryu sound like a "wise fighter". His fight against Seiya was also found enjoyable by the reviewer for the amount of violence that might be seen as fanservice and the dramatic considerations when the cast believes one of the two would die. Chris Beveridge from AnimeOnDVD liked the fight between Shiryu and Death Mask, calling it one of the most interesting showdowns from the DVD reviewed, also finding a level of risk enjoyable due to Shiryu nearly falling to the Underworld. Mark Thomas of the Fandom Post criticized Shiryu's overuse of his Rising Dragon, as he tends to repeat in all of his fights even when his enemies manage to block it. Similarly, in a review of the series, writer Jason Thompson notes Kurumada tends to make overuse of Shiryu's training so that, in a latter fight, he remembers to use a more powerful technique in order to defeat his enemies. Thompson also felt that Shiryu healing Seiya through removing his blood too gruesome, as a similar action is repeated when Shiryu blinds himself to defeat a Silver Saint. IGN noted that Shiryu stands out for being able to fight despite being disabled and is one of Seiya's closest friends despite initially clashing as enemies in the series' beginning. In regards to the Netflix series, HobbyConsolas warned long time fans not to expect the original violent battle between Shiryu and Seiya from the original series as a result of the intended demographic.
