= Pegasus Seiya =

Fictional character from Saint Seiya

- Saint Seiya character
- Pegasus Seiya from the manga
- First appearance: Manga; Saint Suits Chapter 1: "The Saints of Athena" (1985)
- Created by: Masami Kurumada
- Portrayed by: Mackenyu
- Voiced by: Japanese; Tōru Furuya (anime and Omega); Hiroko Emori (child); Masakazu Morita (Hades OVAs and Knights of the Zodiac); Kaito Ishikawa (Legend of Sanctuary); English; Jeff Bennett (Guardians of the Cosmos); Tim Hamaguchi (DiC dub); Illich Guardiola (ADV dub); Cameron Bautsch (child, ADV dub); Bryson Baugus (Knights of the Zodiac/Netflix dub); Spanish; Jesús Barrero (Latin American dub)

In-universe information
- Affiliations: Bronze Saints
- Birthplace: Original series: Japan; 2019 remake: Honolulu, Hawaii, U.S.

Pegasus Seiya (Japanese: 天馬星座(ペガサス)の星矢, Hepburn: Pegasasu no Seiya), also known as Seiya, is the titular character and main protagonist in the Saint Seiya manga and anime series, created by Masami Kurumada. He debuted in the first chapter "The Saints of Athena" (女神(アテナ)の聖闘士, Atena no Seinto), published in Weekly Shōnen Jump on December 12, 1985. Seiya is one of the eighty-eight Saints, mythical warriors who have served the goddess Athena and protected Earth throughout the ages, though he is initially only interested in finding his missing older sister, Seika. He eventually becomes one of the twelve strongest Saints, the Gold Saint Sagittarius Seiya (射手座サジタリアスの星矢, Sajitariasu no Seiya), while personally assisting Athena's reincarnation, Saori Kido. Seiya is the successor of Sagittarius Aiolos, the previous wielder of his Gold Cloth, who often sends his protection even before Seiya becomes a Gold Saint. As a Saint, Seiya dons a Cloth, an armor of divine origin, with his Cloth representing the constellation of Pegasus, and possesses superhuman strength and speed, which are among the abilities the Saints draw from their guardian constellations and the inner essence of Cosmo. Seiya has also appeared as a main supporting character in other works related to Saint Seiya, such as the anime Saint Seiya Omega and the Saint Seiya Episode.G manga trilogy.

Seiya's design was inspired by Ryuji Takane, the protagonist of Kurumada's manga Ring ni Kakero. He was originally voiced by Tōru Furuya in the anime series and films before being replaced by Masakazu Morita.

== Creation and conception ==
Kurumada originally planned to create a manga about wrestling, as he enjoyed writing about individual sports rather than collective sports. He was initially inspired by The Karate Kid (1984) to create a story about Seiya, a young karateka who is found by a karate master and his female assistant; however, his publishing department did not approve the idea. While creating Saint Seiya, which he originally titled Ginga no Rin (銀河の輪, "Rin of the Galaxy"), Kurumada initially gave Seiya the name Rin. However, as he developed the story, he changed his name to Seiya, which he felt was more fitting. Seiya's name was originally written with the kanji for "holy arrow" (聖矢, seiya), relating to his position as a Saint, but he later decided to write it with the kanji for "star arrow", to emphasize the constellation and mythological motif. He also changed the title of the manga to Saint Seiya once the concept of the Saints was fully developed. Kurumada stated that one of the first ideas he had for Saint Seiya was the "Pegasus Meteor Fist". Since the manga was going to use the constellations as a recurring theme, he wanted his protagonist to have a special move that would be like a shower of meteors. Along with Hyoga's Cygnus, Pegasus was chosen as Seiya's constellation from the beginning, with the series later expanding on the twelve signs of the zodiac. Kurumada recalled that, as in some of his previous works, the main characters were less popular compared to the supporting cast.

Seiya's likeness was inspired by Ryuji Takane, the protagonist of Kurumada's manga Ring ni Kakero, which he considers to be his favorite creation. Most protagonists in his works bear a resemblance to Ryuji because Kurumada subscribes to Osamu Tezuka's Star System: the principle of maintaining a stable cast of characters who play different or similar roles in an author's works, which was used to create most characters in the series. The Sagittarius Gold Cloth was chosen as the most famous of the Gold Cloths because of its symbolism in relation to Seiya. He felt that Seiya's name was a perfect match for him, as the Japanese meaning of his name, "star arrow", is a metaphor for "meteor" and Sagittarius represents an archer, especially since he had in mind that Seiya would eventually wear the Sagittarius Gold Cloth. As such, Seiya's zodiacal sign is Sagittarius. Seiya's God Cloth was specifically created to defeat the God Thanatos, though Kurumada felt that he exaggerated this in retrospect.

=== Casting ===
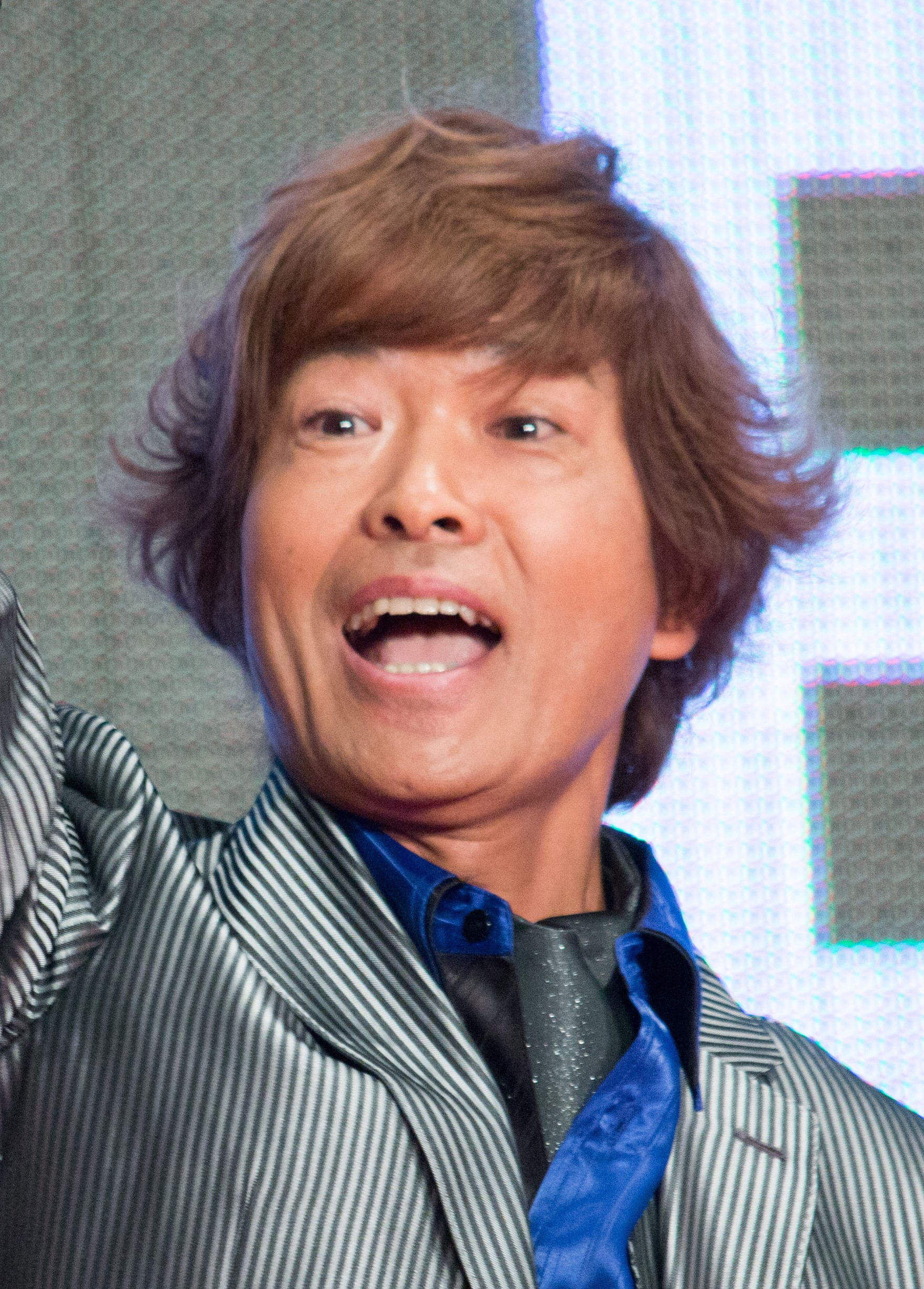
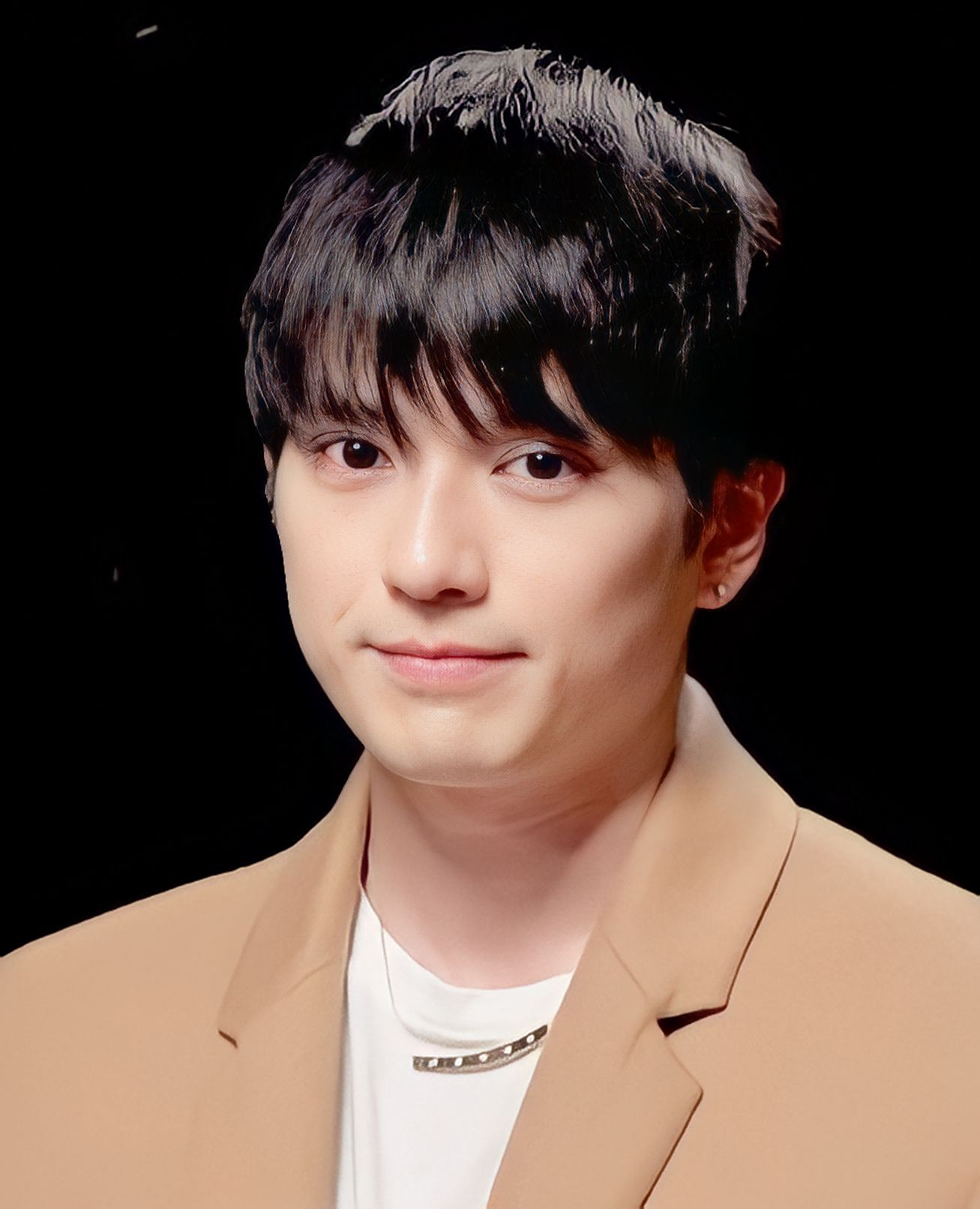
Toru Furuya (left) was Seiya's first Japanese actor, while Mackenyu (right) portrayed him in the live-action film.

In the animated adaptations of the series, Seiya was voiced by several voice actors. Tōru Furuya voiced him in the 1986 anime series, all five theatrical releases, the first series of original video animations (OVA) adapting the Hades arc of the original manga, released in 2004, and the 2012 anime series Saint Seiya Omega. Hiroko Emori provided additional voice acting for scenes in which Seiya appears as a child. In the Hades arc OVAs, released from 2005 to 2008, Seiya was voiced by Masakazu Morita. In the uncensored ADV English dub, he was voiced by Illich Guardiola and Cameron Bautsch, and by Tim Hamaguchi in the censored dub by DiC Entertainment. He is voiced by Bryson Baugus in the CG Knights of the Zodiac and the Netflix dub. In the Latin American dub, he was voiced by Jesús Barrero.

Furuya stated that Seiya was his favorite character out of all his voice roles and laughed when performing his "Pegasus Meteor Fist". Morita stated that Seiya was one of his favorite characters due to how "passionate" he is. Kaito Ishikawa stated that he was happy with the work he was assigned to for Legend of Sanctuary.

== Character ==
Seiya is the titular character and main protagonist of Saint Seiya and one of the eighty-eight Saints who serve Athena. Seiya draws his superhuman powers from the Cosmos, the energy of the Big Bang that is present in all living things and connects a Saint to his constellation and Cloth. At the start of the series, Seiya is thirteen years old. His main goal is to find his older sister, Seika, who disappeared when he was sent to Greece to train to become a Saint under the Silver Saint Eagle Marin. Due to her physical similarities to Seika, Seiya suspects that Marin may be his sister, but is proven wrong after he finds Seika. As Seiya begins fighting alongside the other Bronze Saints, albeit reluctantly at first, his motivations shift to protecting Athena. Although passionate and brave, he can be brash and impulsive at times. Despite this, he is kind-hearted and selfless, willing to risk or sacrifice himself for justice, his friends, and Athena. His most notable trait is his determination and refusal to give up, even against the odds. He also has a habit of making jokes and can be unconcerned about the consequences of his actions.

== Appearances ==
=== Saint Seiya ===
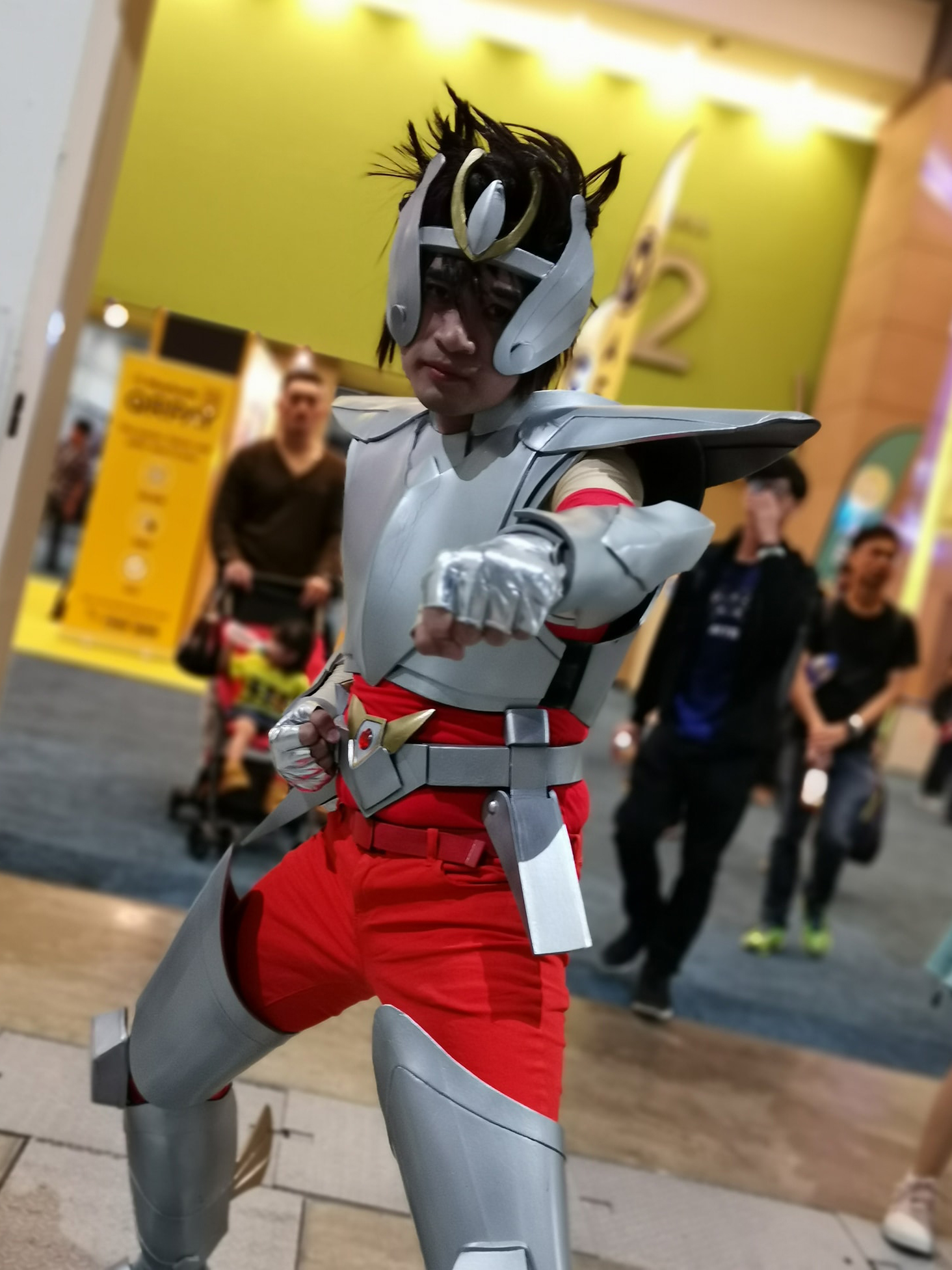
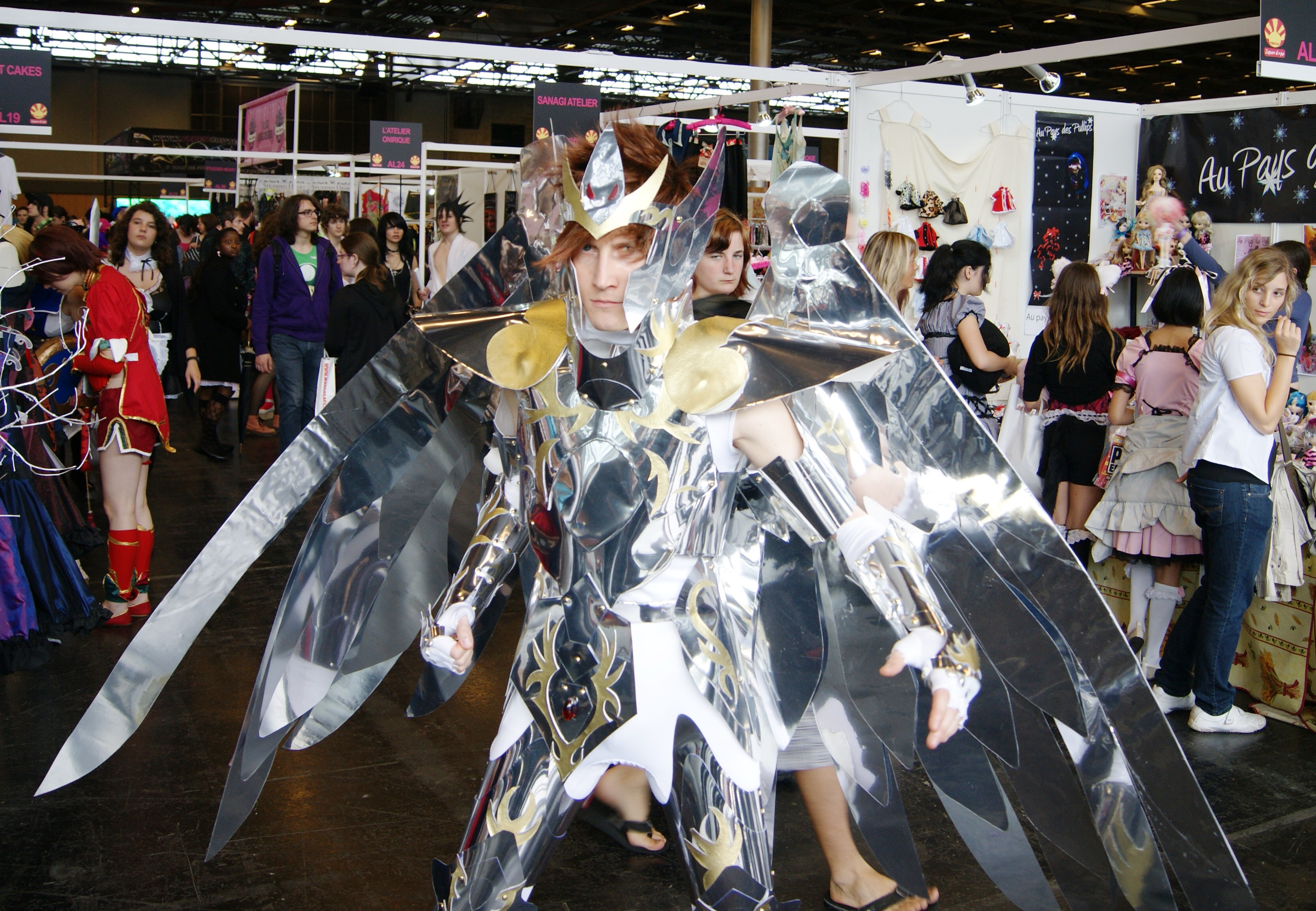
Seiya's Pegasus Cloth evolves across the series, which has led to various cosplays such as its Hades Arc form (left) and the God Cloth (right).

Seiya is a teenager who is sent to Greece to train under Marin and obtain the Pegasus Bronze Cloth before returning home to Japan. There, he discovers that his older sister Seika has gone missing. Saori Kido negotiates with him to fight other people who have become Saints to attract the media's attention and have her group search for Seika. However, his former companion Phoenix Ikki, who seeks revenge for the training he went through, confronts him. Although Seiya defeats Ikki with help from his friends, the Sanctuary's Pope sends the Silver Saints to attack them. After learning that Saori is the reincarnation of Athena, the Saints head to the Sanctuary and through its Twelve Temples before confronting the tyrant Pope, during which Saori is mortally wounded. Although Seiya begins as a Bronze Saint, over time his abilities grow to rival those of the Gold Saints as he awakens his Seventh Sense, the essence and origin of the Cosmo. After mastering the Cosmos known as Seventh Sense, Seiya and his friends defeat the strongest Gold Saints, including the Pope, who is revealed to be Gemini Saga, and save Saori.

Following the battle against Saga, Saori confronts Poseidon's reincarnation, Julian Solo, who seeks to flood the world, and attempts to sacrifice herself to stop him. Along with the Bronze Saints, with his New Bronze Cloths enhanced by the Gold Saint's blood, the Saints travel to Poseidon's submarine temple and fight Poseidon's Mariner Generals in order to save Saori. Seiya's Pegasus New Bronze Cloth becomes gold while facing Mariner Sea Horse Baian, and they destroy the North Pacific Ocean's Mammoth Pillar with the Libra Gold Cloth. However, Poseidon's underling Limnades Caça takes the form of Marin and hurts Seiya by telling him that he is Seika until Phoenix Ikki defeats Caça and saves Seiya. While reaching Poseidon, Seiya occasionally wears the Gold Cloth of Sagittarius, whose true owner, Aiolos, died thirteen years prior to the events of the series. Along with Hyoga and Shiryu, who were recognized by their masters' Gold Cloths, they save Saori, who seals Poseidon's soul.

In the Hades arc, Seiya returns to the Sanctuary to talk to Marin, but instead finds Aries Mu being attacked by the undead Cancer Death Mask and Pisces Aphrodite. He is sent out of the Sanctuary by an order from Athena meant to protect the Bronze Saints from the Lord of the Underworld, Hades. After Saori's suicide, Seiya reunites with Hyoga, Shun, and Shiryu and meets with the previous Pope, Aries Shion, who repairs their damaged Bronze Cloths with Athena's blood into Final Bronze Cloths. He is then ordered to deliver Athena's God Cloth to her in the Underworld. Before descending into the realm of Hades, he awakens his Eighth Sense: Arayashiki, which allows him to enter the Underworld without being subject to Hades' rule, just like Saori's fake death. In the Underworld, Seiya and Shun meet the missing Silver Saint Lyra Orphée, who plans to kill Hades by attacking him with the Judges. However, Orphée dies, Hades possesses Shun, and Wyvern Rhadamanthys traps Seiya in a frozen hell. Harpy Valentine attempts to bury Ikki and Seiya, but is tricked into freeing them after they claim to have Athena's Cloth. After Seiya kills Valentine, he reunites with the Bronze Saints and leaves the Underworld. The Pegasus Final Bronze Cloth that Seiya uses in the Hades arc has wings that allow him to fly, both normally and through dimensions. Using the wings, Seiya arrives in Elysion, where he encounters the God of Death, Thanatos, who he and his friends struggle to defeat even with the Gold Cloths. However, when Seiya learns that Saori has found Seika, his Cosmos causes the destroyed Pegasus Final Bronze Cloth to transform into a Pegasus God Bronze Cloth and reach Thanatos' level. After defeating Thanatos, Seiya encounters and confronts Hades. During their final fight, Seiya delivers Athena's God Cloth to Saori, but is mortally wounded while protecting her when Hades stabs him in the heart, and his Cosmo disappears shortly before Athena and the God Bronze Saints' victory.

=== Saint Seiya: Next Dimension ===
In Saint Seiya: Next Dimension, Seiya survived his death after Hades' attack, but is in a catatonic state as a result of the curse inflicted by his sword. To save him, Athena (Saori Kido), Andromeda Shun, Phoenix Ikki, Dragon Shiryu, and Cygnus Hyoga travel back in time to remove Hades' sword before it can strike Seiya's heart. Seiya is proclaimed as the future Sagittarius Gold Saint and successor to Sagittarius Aiolos. With Saori and his friends' help, Hades' sword is destroyed, breaking the curse and restoring Seiya's life. He runs to beg for forgiveness from the God of the Sun, Apollo, who is punishing Athena and the Bronze Saints for time travelling in order to save his life. Saori decides to give up divinity in exchange for him forgiving their lives; Apollo accepts, but not before erasing the memories of Saori, Seiya, and the Bronze Saints.

=== Saint Seiya: Heaven Chapter ===
In Saint Seiya: Heaven Chapter, Seiya has lost his memories of his life as Pegasus Bronze Saint, living with his older sister Seika after reuniting with her.

=== As Pegasus Tenma ===
Tenma is Seiya's incarnation in the 18th century, who appears in Kurumada's Saint Seiya: Next Dimension and Shiori Teshirogi's Saint Seiya: The Lost Canvas manga. Tenma is a childhood friend of Alone, Hades' chosen body in that time.

=== In other media ===
While Seiya often wears the Sagittarius Cloth in the manga and anime, he does not become its official wielder until Saint Seiya Omega and Episode.G Assassin.

Seiya appears in Toei's Saint Seiya movies, facing new enemies that threaten the world. In the Saint Seiya: Heaven Chapter – Overture canonical movie, which takes place after the events of the OVA Saint Seiya: The Hades Chapter, Seiya is in a coma after being cursed by Hades' sword, while the Gods of Olympus and the Angels attack Athena and the Bronze Saints. After recovering from his coma, Seiya goes to the Sanctuary to reclaim his Pegasus Final Bronze Cloth. After reaching Saori, Seiya is cured by Athena's staff and recovers his Cosmos to defeat the Moon Goddess Artemis's Angel Toma, who is revealed to be Marin's long-lost younger brother. Although Seiya confronts the Sun God Apollo and manages to wound him, the conclusion of their fight is not shown; instead, the climax of the movie shows Seiya apparently becoming reacquainted with Saori. It was explained in the Japanese DVD audio commentary with director Shigeyasu Yamauchi that, since Seiya and Saori's greatest strength was their love and trust for each other, Apollo erased their memories so that they would not regain the will to rebel against the gods.

Seiya also appears in a scene from Saint Seiya Episode.G, which reenacts his fight against Aiolia. In the sequel Episode.G Assassin, an older Seiya appears in a parallel universe to protect Shiryu from Sigurd. With Athena's help, Seiya reawakens his Pegasus God Bronze Cloth, giving him the power to defeat Sigurd. When the god Zeus inhabits Aiolia's body, Seiya takes Amaterasu's Kusanagi no Tsurugi to face him, but is outmatched in battle. Capricorn Shura appears and uses the sword of Kusanagi to sever the bond between Zeus and Aiolia. In the series' finale, the Bronze Saints take different paths, with the wounded Seiya protecting the world as Athena's Saint. He officially becomes Aiolos' successor, Sagittarius Seiya, earning the nickname "Saint Seiya". In Episode.G Requiem, Seiya, despite being wounded by Hades' sword, confronts Pontus and Brontes to prevent the world from ending. Aries Shion manages to restore the Pegasus Cloth, which Seiya wields to protect the Sanctuary. Although Seiya is defeated, he is saved by Hades' sword, as it does not allow him to fall into the Underworld again. With help from Shun, Capricorn Shura, and Taurus Aldebaran, Seiya defeats his enemies and learns that the gods are creating their own Saints. Seiya is shocked to learn that his current enemy is none other than his biological father and Saori's foster grandfather, Mitsumasa Kido, now reborn as a divine being, and that the gods have killed Athena.

In Saint Seiya Omega, Seiya is shown in several flashbacks as having recovered from his death by Hades' sword and still serving Athena. Near the end of the first season, Seiya returns to help the Bronze Saints stop the God of Darkness Abzu from manipulating Koga, to whom he lends his Sagittarius Gold Cloth. Following Abzu's defeat, Athena assigns Seiya the mission of killing the Goddess Pallas, but he fails due to his hesitation. Seiya later goes to defend the Academy Palestra and joins the Bronze and Steel Saints in their fights against Pallas' soldiers. When reaching Pallas' territory, he is put in charge of guarding Athena along with the Gold Saints until she confronts Pallas. Following Athena's victory, Seiya defeats Pallas' bodyguard Titan and dons the newly evolved Sagittarius God Cloth. He later fights the God of Time, Saturn, but is defeated and lends his Cosmos to Koga so that he will succeed in battle.

== Reception ==
In Japan, Seiya is the least popular of the main characters in Saint Seiya, ranking fifth in the Bronze Saints character poll. However, in the technique poll, his Pegasus Meteor Fist ranked first. Merchandise based on Seiya has also been released, including plushes and action figures with different Cloths. In a Saint Seiya Omega poll, Seiya was voted as the best character.

Several anime and manga publications have provided both acclaim and criticism of Seiya's character. DVDVerdictReview.com describes Seiya as poorly developed, characterised by his affiliations and connection to a constellation. DVDVisionJapan comments on Seiya's character and praises voice actors Tōru Furuya and Illich Guardiola for adding emotion and passion into his character. Anime News Network comments that Seiya's voice actor for the English dub is unsuitable, that he enunciates strange words, and does not sound heroic. They also criticized Seiya for being an "underdog" in most battles. Chris Beveridge from AnimeOnDVD found that Seiya was overshadowed by his comrades in the anime's tenth DVD, but found that the other characters made the DVD appealing. In a review of the series, writer Jason Thompson notes that one of Seiya's early fights against the Black Saints ends with one of the most painful scenes, as Seiya's blood is contaminated and his friend Shiryu has to heal him by removing his blood. Additionally, Thompson noted that Seiya's speech in the series' last arc regarding how he blames gods for humanity's problems is similar to "atheism or anti-theism", comparing him with the 2010 film Clash of the Titans. Mark Thomas of the Fandom Post criticized Seiya's overuse of his Meteor Fist, even when his enemies manage to block it. In a review of Legend of Sanctuary, Screen praised Seiya's comical characterization and the performance of the Pegasus Meteor Fist technique. GamerFocus complimented how Seiya and his friends were handled in Saint Seiya Omega as while the protagonist, Pegasus Koga, stars alongside a new group of Saints, Seiya's actions do not take the spotlight.

In "Blood, Biceps, and Beautiful Eyes: Cultural Representations of Masculinity in Masami Kurumada's Saint Seiya", author Lorna Piatti-Farnell notes that the masculinity Seiya, Shun, Hyoga and Shiryu bow to involves accomplishments of their goals of justice might not come as a surprise, as the magazine Shonen Jump often has manga that involves this predicament.

In regards to the Netflix series, HobbyConsolas warned long time fans not to expect the original violent battle between Shiryu and Seiya from the original series as a result of the intended demographic. The Daily Dot criticized the friendship Seiya develops with his friends, as they form a bond despite knowing each other for only four episodes in the Netflix series.

In "Las funciones del Leitmotiv musical como componente narrativo de los géneros de animación japonesa Shonen y Seinen", Carlos Manuel and Yache Vigo from Universidad Privada del Norte described Seiya as a character distinguished by his bravery and his passion, which is easily notable when his leitmotif starts playing in the series. Yebrail Castañeda Lozano, in the journal Educación y Ciudad, writes that while Saint Seiya might come across as generic due to the handlings of good and evil, early on the story there is a major contrast between Seiya and the other characters. They are fighting for the Gold Cloth rather than justice, which would become the center of another conflict when the renegade Phoenix Ikki and the Black Saints come to Japan to steal it.
