= Lorna Piatti-Farnell =

Popular culture researcher

- Born: 1980 (age 45–46)
- Board member of: Gothic Association of New Zealand and Australia

Academic background
- Education: Loughborough University

Lorna Piatti-Farnell (born 1980) is an academic in New Zealand who researches popular media and cultural history. She is professor of film and popular culture at Auckland University of Technology (AUT).

== Academic career ==
Lorna Piatti-Farnell was born in 1980. She was educated at Loughborough University, Leicestershire, graduating in 2009 with a PhD. She was employed by De Montfort University and Bishop Grosseteste University prior to moving to New Zealand where she joined AUT in 2010, being promoted to full professor, effective 1 January 2020.

Piatti-Farnell founded the Gothic Association of New Zealand and Australia (GANZA) in 2014 and is its president. The organisation facilitates interdisciplinary sharing of all aspect of Gothic culture.

== Selected works ==
=== Books ===
- Piatti-Farnell, Lorna (2011). Food and culture in contemporary American fiction. Routledge. ISBN 9781138548039.
- Piatti-Farnell, Lorna (2014). The vampire in contemporary popular literature. New York: Routledge. ISBN 978-0-203-50157-3.
- Piatti-Farnell, Lorna; Brien, Donna Lee, eds. (12 February 2018), New directions in 21st century gothic the gothic compass, New York, N.Y.: Routledge (published 2015), ISBN 9781138547759
- Piatti-Farnell, Lorna (15 April 2016), Banana: A global history, Reaktion Books Ltd (published 2016), ISBN 978-1-78023-571-4
- Piatti-Farnell, Lorna (10 March 2017). Consuming gothic: Food and horror in film. London: Palgrave Macmillan. ISBN 978-1-137-45051-7.
- Piatti-Farnell, Lorna; Brien, Donna Lee, eds. (2018), The Routledge Companion to Literature and Food, Routledge, Abingdon, UK, ISBN 9781138048430
- Piatti-Farnell, Lorna (2019). Gothic afterlives: Reincarnations of horror in film and popular media. Lanham: Lexington Books. ISBN 978-1-4985-7822-6.

=== Articles ===
- McAllister, Margaret; Brien, Donna Lee; Piatti-Farnell, Lorna (February 2018). "Tainted love: Gothic imaging of nurses in popular culture". Journal of Advanced Nursing. 74 (2): 310–317. doi:10.1111/jan.13452. PMID 28910506.
- Piatti-Farnell, Lorna (12 February 2019). "Arctic Gothic: Genre, folklore, and the cinematic horror landscape of Dead Snow (2009)". Studies in European Cinema. 18: 76–85. doi:10.1080/17411548.2019.1574121. ISSN 1741-1548. S2CID 194192895.
- Piatti-Farnell, Lorna; Brien, Donna Lee (1 September 2019). "Contemporary popular culture studies". Australasian Journal of Popular Culture. 8 (2): 139–141. doi:10.1386/ajpc_00001_2. ISSN 2045-5852. S2CID 212805936.
- Piatti-Farnell, Lorna; King, Emerald L. (18 March 2020). "Dream Cultures". M/C Journal. 23 (1). doi:10.5204/mcj.1647. ISSN 1441-2616.
