= Saint Seiya (TV series) =

Japanese anime television series

- 聖闘士星矢
- Also known as: Knights of the Zodiac
- Type: TV series
- Genre: Fantasy; Martial arts; Mythological
- Based on: Saint Seiya
- Created by: Masami Kurumada
- Directed by: Kōzō Morishita (#1–73); Kazuhito Kikuchi (#74–114)
- Series composition: Takao Koyama (#1–73); Yoshiyuki Suga (#74–114)
- Character designers: Shingo Araki; Michi Himeno
- Music by: Seiji Yokoyama
- Opening themes: "Pegasus Fantasy"; by Make-Up; "Soldier Dream"; by Hironobu Kageyama & Broadway
- Ending themes: "Blue Forever"; by Make-Up; "Blue Dream"; by Hironobu Kageyama & Broadway
- No. of episodes: 114 (list of episodes)

Production
- Studio: Toei Animation
- Producers: Yoshifumi Hatano; Kazuo Yokoyama; Takeshi Kato (TV Asahi); Masayoshi Kawada (TV Asahi)
- Production companies: TV Asahi; Toei Animation

Original release
- Network: ANN (TV Asahi)
- Release: October 11, 1986 – April 1, 1989

Related
- Saint Seiya anime films; Saint Seiya: The Hades Chapter (sequel); Knights of the Zodiac: Saint Seiya (reboot)

Saint Seiya (Japanese: 聖闘士星矢, Hepburn: Seinto Seiya) is a Japanese anime television series based on Masami Kurumada's manga series Saint Seiya. The series follows five mystical warriors known as the Saints who fight using sacred armor known as "Cloths" to defend the reincarnation of the Olympian goddess Athena in her battle against other gods that want to take over the world. It was produced by Toei Animation and broadcast on TV Asahi and its affiliates from October 1986 to April 1989. It spawned four animated feature films, multiple video games and merchandise. The series was later exported and broadcast in over 75 countries worldwide.

Toei would adapt the manga's Hades Arc as an original video animation (OVA) series, subtitled The Hades Chapter, released from 2002 to 2008. The studio would be responsible for Saint Seiya: Heaven Chapter – Overture in 2004, serving as the final continuation of the Hades Arc.

Nearly 14 years after the show ended, it was licensed for North America, Australia, and New Zealand. Two separate English dubs were produced, one that premiered on Cartoon Network in the United States and on YTV in Canada in 2003, released under the title Knights of the Zodiac, covering 40 episodes, and a later dub that covered all 60 licensed episodes and was released on DVD from 2003 to 2005.

In 2019, Netflix acquired the North American streaming rights and Toei Animation Inc. commissioned Sentai Studios, a division of Sentai Filmworks to produce another English dub, covering the entire run and utilizing the same cast as the ONA series, Knights of the Zodiac: Saint Seiya. Netflix's rights expired in December 2021.

== Plot ==
After training in Greece to master cosmic energy, Seiya becomes the Pegasus Bronze Saint, one of eighty-eight warriors sworn to protect the goddess Athena. Returning to Japan, he seeks his missing sister, Seika, but learns from foundation head Saori Kido that her whereabouts will be revealed only if he participates in her Galaxy Wars tournament. The event is disrupted by the vengeful Phoenix Ikki, whom Seiya and his allies—Cygnus Hyoga, Andromeda Shun, and Dragon Shiryū—defeat.

This victory attracts the attention of the Sanctuary in Greece. Its Pope sends assassins for the Sagittarius Gold Cloth in Saori's possession, and she is revealed to be Athena's reincarnation. They travel to the Sanctuary to confront the Pope, who mortally wounds Saori. To save her, the Bronze Saints battle through the twelve Zodiac temples guarded by Gold Saints. Seiya secures the Athena Shield to heal her, and she confronts the Pope, exposed as the imposter Gemini Saga, who then commits suicide.

Peace is broken when Hilda of Polaris, controlled by Poseidon, attacks. The Bronze Saints defeat her warriors in Asgard, breaking the god's influence. Poseidon's vessel, Julian Solo, kidnaps Athena. In his undersea temple, the Saints discover the plot is led by Gemini Kanon. Aided by the Gold Cloths of Sagittarius Aiolos and Aquarius Camus, and the weapons of the Libra Cloth, they overwhelm Poseidon. Athena seals the god away and vows to eternally protect the world.

== Cast ==
Character	Japanese voice actor	English voice actor		
Character	Japanese voice actor	DIC dub (Note: Dubbing work by DIC, Kaleidoscope Entertainment and Wanted!) (2003)	ADV Studios dub (2003)	Sentai Studios dub (2019)
Pegasus Seiya	Tōru Furuya	Tim Hamaguchi	Illich Guardiola	Bryson Baugus
Dragon Shiryū	Hirotaka Suzuoki	Dan Warry-Smith	Jay Hickman	Blake Shepard
Cygnus Hyoga	Kōichi Hashimoto	Stuart Stone	Jason Douglas	Patrick Poole
Andromeda Shun	Ryō Horikawa	Andrew Sabiston	Chris Patton	Blake Jackson
Phoenix Ikki	Hideyuki Hori	Scott McCord	Mike MacRae	Adam Gibbs
Saori Kido / Athena	Keiko Han	Stacey DePass	Allison Sumrall	Emily Neves
Narrator	Hideyuki Tanaka	George Buza	Andy McAvin	Marty Fleck

== Production and release ==
An anime adaptation of Saint Seiya was first proposed in June 1986, three months before the first manga volume was published. After Toei Animation started a partnership with TV Asahi, they looked for sponsors. Bandai got interested in selling the Saint Cloths as merchandise so it began development. TV Asahi producer Masayoshi Kawata thought that Saint Seiya was the perfect fit for the "hero show" they were looking for. By July of that same year, screenwriter Takao Koyama had written the first episode scheduled to be broadcast in October. Since an episode adapts several chapters the anime goes faster than the manga, which led the TV series staff to create some original stories to fill the gap. The animation staff deliberately designed protagonist Seiya as a more simplistic character compared to other leads. His signature techniques were animated by depicting the Pegasus constellation across the background while Seiya executed a minimal, almost static preparatory movement. This created a striking contrast between the surprising speed of the attack and Seiya's own perceived stillness. Significant effort was also devoted to animating the Cloths, employing multiple shading techniques to achieve a realistic appearance. Kurumada expressed mixed feelings with the adaptation: while pleased with its expanded reach, he likened the process to "giving [his] daughter away in marriage." He praised the sound design, noting its superiority over written onomatopoeia.

The series was broadcast on TV Asahi and its affiliates from October 11, 1986, to April 1, 1989. It was directed first by Kōzō Morishita (episodes 1–73) and then by Kazuhito Kikuchi (episodes 74–114). The character designers and aestheticists were Shingo Araki and Michi Himeno, and Seiji Yokoyama composed the series' music. Following Kurumada's storylines from the manga closely, series composition was done by Koyama from episodes 1–73 and Yoshiyuki Suga from episodes 74–114. The series has three main parts: Sanctuary (episodes 1–73), Asgard—an anime original story arc (episodes 74–99), and Poseidon (episodes 100–114). The series was cancelled and left unfinished, with the final story arc of the manga not animated until it was adapted into an original video animation series, titled Saint Seiya: The Hades Chapter, which premiered in 2002. The entire series was later released on two Blu-ray box sets on June 20 and September 24, 2014. It was re-broadcast on TV Asahi in 2015.

=== International release ===
After Japan, Saint Seiya was first broadcast in France in 1988 on TF1's Club Dorothée, under the title Les Chevaliers du Zodiaque (which inspired the title in other language versions), and the series became quickly popular. The series was broadcast throughout Asia, Europe and Latin America, where it was a success as well. In North America, the series was first licensed by DIC Entertainment, under the title Knights of the Zodiac, in 2003. The DIC version was edited for broadcast, cutting overly violent scenes, coloring the red blood to blue, adding in previously non-existent digital scene transitions, rewriting the scripts, renaming several characters and replacing the music themes and the original soundtrack. This version premiered in the United States on Cartoon Network on August 30, 2003, and in Canada on YTV on September 5 of the same year. Unlike other territories, Saint Seiya did not succeed in North America, and DIC only dubbed forty episodes. ADV Films licensed the home video rights to the series. They released the DIC-edited version and an uncut version of the show with English subtitles, which also included a new dub (with a different voice cast than the one used by DIC). ADV Films released the first twenty-eight episodes of the edited version on seven DVDs from January 27 to October 25, 2004, and released only sixty episodes of the uncut version on twelve DVDs from October 21, 2003, to May 31, 2005. A box-set collection was released on January 13, 2009. New Video released the first seventy-three episodes on a subtitle-only DVD set, titled Saint Seiya: Sanctuary Classic Complete Collection, on April 15, 2014. On October 15, 2019, Netflix began streaming a third English dub, featuring the cast from Knights of the Zodiac: Saint Seiya; the first fifteen episodes premiered first and episodes 16–41 were added some days later; episodes 42–73 were added in January 2020; and episodes 74–114 were added in April 2020, in effect making the Netflix dub the only complete English dub of the entire original series. The series was removed from the platform in December 2021. Crunchyroll added the series to its catalogue in April 2023.

== Music ==
The series uses four different musical pieces, two opening themes and two ending themes respectively. For episodes 1–73, the opening theme is "Pegasus Fantasy" (ペガサス幻想, Pegasasu Fantajī), while the ending theme is "Blue Forever" (永遠ブルー, Eien Burū), both performed by Make-Up. For the remainder of the series, the opening theme is "Soldier Dream" (聖闘士神話(ソルジャー・ドリーム), Sorujā Dorīmu), while the ending theme is "Blue Dream" (夢旅人(ブルー・ドリーム), Burū Dorīmu), both performed by Hironobu Kageyama and Broadway.

Seiji Yokoyama was the main composer for the series. Some of the albums in the discography include the following:

- Saint Seiya Original Soundtrack I–VIII (1987–1989)
- Saint Seiya – Piano Fantasia (1989)
- Saint Seiya – Hades (1990)
- Saint Seiya – 1996 Song Collection (1996)
- Saint Seiya – 1997 Shonenki (1997)
- Saint Seiya – Gold Collection: Best Songs & Symphonic Suites (spanning 5 CDs) (1997)
- Saint Seiya – Memorial Box (spanning 5 CDs) (2002)
- Saint Seiya – Song Selection (2016)

== Reception ==
Saint Seiya won the Animage Anime Grand Prix prize in 1987. The series ranked 53rd in Animage's 2001 "Top-100 Anime" list, and placed 25th in a 2006 TV Asahi nationwide poll of the most popular animated television series. In an NHK online poll celebrating a century of Japanese animation, it ranked 123rd.

The series was regarded as a major cultural phenomenon of the 1980s and inspired numerous subsequent works. These included several Gundam series such as Mobile Suit Gundam Wing and Mobile Fighter G Gundam, as well as Legend of Heavenly Sphere Shurato, Ronin Warriors, Wild Knights Gulkeeva, and Masami Kurumada's later manga B't X. In The Anime Encyclopedia: A Guide to Japanese Animation Since 1917, Jonathan Clements and Helen McCarthy commended the series' intricate plot and described the animation by Shingo Araki and Michi Himeno as "magic." They also praised the soundtrack and director Shigeyasu Yamauchi's skillful pacing and use of cliffhangers. However, they noted a disturbing aspect in the series' emotional core, which they felt derived from depictions of older males battling and defeating courageous but naive teenagers to acquire better weaponry.

DVDVisionJapan's Devin Pratt highlighted the brutality of Hyoga's first fight, noting how the Hydra Saint's repeated punches to his face sent blood flying out of the arena and onto Seiya. The review also praised Hirotaka Suzuoki's performance for giving Shiryu the voice of a "wise fighter." Similarly, AnimeOnDVD's Chris Beveridge found Hyoga's clash with his former master, Camus, to be a particularly interesting and fun fight. Beveridge also highlighted the Shiryu vs. Death Mask showdown as a standout, enjoying the high stakes of Shiryu nearly falling into the Underworld. DVD Talk's Todd Douglass Jr. praised the series for its high drama and epic storylines, though he observed that the English dub was of lower quality than the original Japanese audio.

Yebrail Castañeda Lozano, writing in the journal Educación y Ciudad, observed that although Saint Seiya might appear conventional in its treatment of good and evil, the early episodes presented a significant contrast between Seiya and the other characters: they fought for the Gold Cloth rather than for justice, a conflict that later intensified when the rogue Phoenix Ikki and the Black Saints arrived in Japan to steal it.
