= Shingo Araki =

Japanese animation artist and character designer

- 荒木 伸吾
- Born: 28 November 1938; Aichi, Japan
- Died: 1 December 2011 (aged 72); Itabashi, Tokyo, Japan
- Occupations: Animation Director, Character Designer

Shingo Araki (荒木 伸吾, Araki Shingo; November 28, 1938 – December 1, 2011) was a Japanese animation artist and character designer.

== Career ==
He developed an interest for drawing at age five. He graduated in Aichi Prefecture. In 1955, at age sixteen, he debuted as a cartoonist in the "Machi" magazine. He then joined Mushi Production as animator in 1965 and later founded Studio Jaguar in 1966. In 1970, he debuted as animation director in the Mushi TV Series "Joe of Tomorrow", and later worked on the anime adaptations of several of Go Nagai's manga, including Devilman (1972), Cutie Honey (1973), and UFO Robo Grendizer (1975), serving as a character designer on the latter two. With his work on Cutie Honey as well as Mahō no Mako-chan, Mahou Tsukai Chappy, Majokko Megu-chan, and Hana no Ko Lunlun, Araki was an important figure in Toei Animation's early magical girl anime series of the 1970s.

He usually collaborated with animation director Michi Himeno, whom he met in 1973. They formed Araki Production in 1975. He worked as animation director in 1978's "Arrivederci Yamato". He, with Himeno, have been celebrated for their success. The Araki-Himeno duo collaborated on TV series and animated films such Saint Seiya and Yu-Gi-Oh!.

Some of his successes are Majokko Megu-chan (1974), Lupin III (1977), Mugen Kido SSX (Captain Harlock, 1978), Versailles no Bara (Lady Oscar, 1979), Hana no Ko Lunlun (Angel, 1979, which featured character designs by Michi Himeno and animation by Araki), and Fūma no Kojirō (1991). International accreditation came with Saint Seiya (Knights of the Zodiac, 1986), for his dynamic drawing style along with the elegant drawings styles of Michi. This Dynamic Duel, as they are known, have been instrumental in the success of the series.

Working for Toei Animation and Tokyo Movie Shinsha, Araki was also an animator on several American and French productions which outsourced animation work to Japan, including Ulysses 31 (1981), Inspector Gadget (Season 1, 1983–84, animation), Mighty Orbots (1984, key animation), The Adventures of the American Rabbit (1986) and G.I. Joe: The Movie (1987).

== Works ==
‡ denotes the works in which Shingo Araki shares the role of character designer with Michi Himeno.

=== Anime television series ===
| Year(s) | Title | Character designer | Animation director | Other |
|---|---|---|---|---|
| 1965–1966 | Kimba the White Lion | No | No | Key animation |
| 1966–1967 | Leo the Lion | No | Yes (Note: Episodes 21 and 24) | |
| 1967–1968 | Perman | No | No | Storyboards (27 episodes) |
| 1968–1971 | Star of the Giants | Yes | No | Key animation |
| 1969 | The Ideal Boys' Gang Leader | No | No | Key animation |
| 1969–1971 | Attack No. 1 | No | No | Key Animation |
| 1970–1971 | Tomorrow's Joe | No | Yes (Note: Episodes 4, 6, 9, 13, 16, 18, 21, 23, 26, 30, 34, 40, 47, 50, 56, 62, 66, 71 and 76 (19 episodes)) | |
| 1970–1971 | Maco the Mermaid | No | Yes (Note: Episodes 30, 34 and 42) | |
| 1970–1971 | The Demon of Kickboxing | No | No | Key animation |
| 1971–1972 | Apache Baseball Team | No | Yes (Note: Episodes 18, 20 and 23–26 (6 episodes)) | |
| 1971–1972 | Ryu the Cave Boy | No | Yes (Note: Episode 21 only) | |
| 1972 | Moonlight Mask | No | No | Key animation |
| 1972 | Chappy the Witch | No | Yes (Note: Episodes 4, 10 and 17) | |
| 1972–1973 | Akadō Suzunosuke | No | Yes (Note: Episodes 6, 10, 16, 23, 28, 33, 41, 48 and 52 (9 episodes)) | |
| 1972–1973 | Devilman | No | Yes (Note: Episode 4 only) | |
| 1973 | Babel II | Yes | Yes (Note: Episodes 1–2, 11, 16, 21, 26, 28 and 31 (8 episodes)) | Key animation |
| 1973–1974 | Isamu the Wilderness Boy | No | Yes (Note: Episodes 2, 6, 18, 21, 25, 27, 31, 35, 39, 43, 48 and 52 (12 episodes)) | Key animation |
| 1973–1974 | Cutie Honey | Yes | Yes (Note: Episodes 1 and 12) | |
| 1974 | Ode to Judo | No | Yes (Note: Episodes 4, 8, 12, 18 and 24 (5 episodes)) | |
| 1974–1975 | Megu the Little Witch | Yes | Yes (Note: Episodes 1, 12, 19, 27, 33, 38, 45, 55, 61, 63 and 72 (11 episodes)) | |
| 1975 | Young Boy Tokugawa Ieyasu | Yes | No | |
| 1975–1977 | UFO Robot Grendizer | Yes | Yes (Note: Episodes 5, 17, 20, 25, 29, 35, 40, 44, 50, 56, 63, 68 and 72 (13 episodes)) | Key animation |
| 1975–1982 | Ikkyū-san | No | Yes (Note: Episode 2 only) | |
| 1977–1978 | New Star of the Giants | Yes | Yes (Note: Episodes 2, 4, 6, 8, 10, 12, 14, 16, 18, 20, 22, 24, 26, 28, 30, 32, 34, 36, 38, 40, 42, 44, 46, 48, 50 and 52 (26 episodes)) | |
| 1977–1978 | Planetary Robot Danguard Ace | Yes ‡ | Yes (Note: Episodes 1, 9, 16, 24, 30, 34 and 56 (7 episodes)) | |
| 1978–1981 | Galaxy Express 999 | Yes | No | |
| 1979 | New Star of the Giants II | Yes | Yes (Note: Episodes 2, 4, 6, 8, 10, 12, 14, 16, 18, 20 and 22 (11 episodes)) | |
| 1979–1980 | Heart of the Red Bird | No | Yes (Note: Chief animation director (with Daikichiro Kusube)) | Storyboards (episodes 2, 5, 13, 18 and 24) |
| 1979–1980 | Lulu the Flower Angel | No | No | Key animation |
| 1979–1980 | The Rose of Versailles | Yes ‡ | Yes (Note: Chief animation director (with Michi Himeno)) | |
| 1980–1981 | Lalabel the Magical Girl | Yes | No | |
| 1981–1982 | Ulysses 31 | Yes ‡ | Yes (Note: Chief animation director (with Toyoo Ashida)) | |
| 1982–1983 | Galactic Gale Baxingar | No | No | Animation sequence (Opening) |
| 1982–1983 | Arcadia of My Youth: Endless Orbit SSX | No | Yes (Note: Episodes 1, 5, 10, 15 and 20 (5 episodes)) | Key animation |
| 1983–1984 | Love Me, My Knight | No | Yes (Note: Episodes 10, 13, 15, 18, 23, 29, 35 and 41 (8 episodes)) | |
| 1984 | Glass Mask | No | No | Animation sequence (Opening) |
| 1984 | Mighty Orbots | No | No | Key animation |
| 1984–1985 | Lupin III Part III | No | Yes (Note: Episodes 1 and 7) | |
| 1984–1985 | Little Memole | No | No | Key animation |
| 1984–1985 | Sherlock Hound | No | No | Storyboards (episode 6) |
| 1986–1987 | Maple Town | No | Yes (Note: Episodes 6, 12, 29 and 36) | |
| 1986–1989 | Saint Seiya | Yes ‡ | Yes (Note: Episodes 1, 16, 23, 30, 45, 51, 57, 60, 74, 100, 105, 111 and 114 (13 episodes)) | Animation sequence (Openings/Endings) |
| 1991–1992 | Mitsuteru Yokoyama's Sangokushi | Yes ‡ | No | |
| 1993–1994 | Blue Legend – Shoot! | Yes ‡ | Yes (Note: Episodes 11 and 18) | |
| 1996–1998 | GeGeGe no Kitarō (4th series) | Yes ‡ | Yes (Note: Chief animation director (with Michi Himeno)) | |
| 1997–2000 | The File of Young Kindaichi | Yes ‡ | No | |
| 1998 | Yu-Gi-Oh! | Yes ‡ | No | |
| 2000–2004 | Yu-Gi-Oh! Duel Monsters | Yes ‡ | No | |
| 2004–2011 | Ring ni Kakero 1 | Yes ‡ | Yes (Note: Episode 12 only) | |

=== Feature films ===
| Year | Title | Character designer | Animation director | Key animator |
|---|---|---|---|---|
| 1975 | Hans Christian Andersen's The Little Mermaid | No | No | Yes |
| 1976 | Puss 'n Boots Travels Around the World | No | No | Yes |
| 1977 | The Wild Swans | No | No | Yes |
| 1978 | Arrivederci Yamato | No | Yes | No |
| 1979 | Taro the Dragon Boy | No | No | Yes |
| 1980 | Tomorrow's Joe: The Movie | No | Yes | No |
| 1982 | Space Adventure Cobra | No | No | Yes |
| 1984 | Kenyan Boy | No | No | Yes |
| 1986 | The Adventures of the American Rabbit | No | No | Yes |
| 1986 | Amon Saga | Yes ‡ | No | Yes |
| 1988 | Saint Seiya: Legend of Crimson Youth | Yes ‡ | Yes | No |
| 1996 | The File of Young Kindaichi: Operazakan | Yes ‡ | Yes | No |
| 1999 | The File of Young Kindaichi 2: Murder in the Deep Blue | Yes ‡ | Yes | No |
| 2001 | Siam Neko: The First Mission | Yes ‡ | No | No |
| 2004 | Saint Seiya: Heaven Chapter – Overture | Yes ‡ | Yes | No |

=== Short films ===
- Panda! Go, Panda! (1972): Key animation
- Ikkyū-san and the Mischievous Princess (1978): Animation director
- Saint Seiya: Evil Goddess Eris (1987): Character designer, Aimation director
- Saint Seiya: The Heated Battle of the Gods (1988): Character designer, Animation director
- Saint Seiya: Warriors of the Final Holy Battle (1989): Character designer, Animation director
- Blue Legend – Shoot! (1990): Character designer, Animation director
- GeGeGe no Kitarō: Daikaijū (1996): Character designer, Animation director
- Yu-Gi-Oh! (1999): Character designer, Animation director

=== OVAs ===
* indicates single-episode OVA.

| Year(s) | Title | Character designer | Animation director | Key animator |
|---|---|---|---|---|
| 1986 | Cowardly Venus * | No | No | Yes |
| 1986–1999 | Shōnan Bakusōzoku | No | No | Yes |
| 1989–1990 | Fūma no Kojirō | Yes ‡ | Yes (Note: Episodes 7–10) | No |
| 1991 | Dragon Fist * | Yes ‡ | No | No |
| 1991–1992 | Condition Green | Yes ‡ | No | No |
| 1992 | Babel II | Yes ‡ | No | No |
| 1992 | Fūma Hanran * | Yes ‡ | No | No |
| 1995–2004 | The Human Revolution | Yes ‡ | Yes (Note: Chief animation director (with Michi Himeno)) | No |
| 2002–2008 | Saint Seiya: The Hades Chapter | Yes ‡ | Yes (Note: Chief animation director (with Michi Himeno)) | No |

=== Video games ===
- BURAI: Jōken (Video game): Character Design.
- BURAI: Gekan - Kanketsu-hen (Video game): Character Design.
- BURAI: Hachigyoku no Yūshi Densetsu (Video game): Character Design.
- BURAI II: Yami Kōtei no Gyakushū (Video game): Character Design.
