= Michi Himeno =

Japanese animation artist and character designer

- Born: August 16, 1956 (age 70); Hyogo Japan
- Known for: Animation artist and character designer

Michi Himeno (姫野 美智, Himeno Michi) is a Japanese animation artist and character designer. Her most famous work is on the TV series The Rose of Versailles and Saint Seiya.

== Career ==
In 1973 she began her collaboration with Shingo Araki working on Cutie Honey and went on to work at Toei Animation before forming Araki Productions with him in 1975. Together they have worked on many successful films and series. Typically, she works on the female characters while he works on the male.

Some of her works are Lupin III (1977), The Rose of Versailles (1979), Lulu the Flower Angel (1979), Ulysses 31 (1981), Arcadia of My Youth: Endless Orbit SSX (1982), and the OVA versions of Fūma no Kojirō (1991).

International accreditation came with Saint Seiya (aka Knights of the Zodiac, 1986), for her elegant drawing style along with Araki's dynamic drawing style.

== Work ==
‡ denotes the works in which Michi Himeno shares the role of character designer with Shingo Araki.

=== Anime television series ===
Year(s)	Title	Character designer	Animation director	Key animator
1975–1977	UFO Robot Grendizer	No	No	Yes (Note: Also in-between animator)
1977–1978	Planetary Robot Danguard Ace	Yes ‡	Yes (Note: Episodes 42, 48 and 53)	Yes
1979	New Star of the Giants II	No	No	Yes
1979–1980	Lulu the Flower Angel	Yes	Yes (Note: Episode 1 only)	No
1979–1980	The Rose of Versailles	Yes ‡	Yes (Note: Chief animation director (with Shingo Araki))	Yes
1981–1982	Ulysses 31	No	No	Yes
1982–1983	Arcadia of My Youth: Endless Orbit SSX	No	No	Yes
1983–1984	Love Me, My Knight	No	No	Yes
1984	Glass Mask	No	No	Yes
1984–1985	Lupin III Part III	No	No	Yes
1984–1985	Little Memole	No	Yes (Note: Episodes 6, 12, 18, 24, 30, 36, 41 and 47 (8 episodes))	No
1984–1985	Heathcliff and the Catillac Cats	No	No	Yes (Note: First season only)
1985–1986	Hai Step Jun	No	Yes (Note: Episodes 2, 8, 16, 23, 30, 37 and 43 (7 episodes))	No
1986–1987	Maple Town	No	Yes (Note: Episodes 18, 24 and 47)	No
1986–1989	Saint Seiya	Yes ‡	No	Yes
1991–1992	Mitsuteru Yokoyama's Sangokushi	Yes ‡	No	No
1993–1994	Blue Legend – Shoot!	Yes ‡	No	Yes
1996–1998	GeGeGe no Kitarō (4th series)	Yes ‡	Yes (Note: Chief animation director (with Shingo Araki))	Yes
1997–2000	The File of Young Kindaichi	Yes ‡	No	No
1998	Yu-Gi-Oh!	Yes ‡	No	No
2000–2004	Yu-Gi-Oh! Duel Monsters	Yes ‡	No	No
2004–2011	Ring ni Kakero 1	Yes ‡	No	No
2012–2014	Saint Seiya Omega	No	No	Yes (Note: First season only)

=== Feature films ===
Year	Title	Character designer	Animation director	Key animator
1978	Arrivederci Yamato	No	No	Yes
1982	Space Adventure Cobra	No	No	Yes
1984	Kenyan Boy	No	No	Yes
1986	Amon Saga	Yes ‡	Yes	Yes
1988	Saint Seiya: Legend of Crimson Youth	Yes ‡	No	Yes
1996	The File of Young Kindaichi: Operazakan	Yes ‡	No	No
1999	The File of Young Kindaichi 2: Murder in the Deep Blue	Yes ‡	No	No
2001	Siam Neko: The First Mission	Yes ‡	No	No
2004	Saint Seiya: Heaven Chapter – Overture	Yes ‡	No	No

=== Short films ===
- Lulu the Flower Angel (1980): Character designer
- Saint Seiya: Evil Goddess Eris (1987): Character designer, Key animator
- Saint Seiya: The Heated Battle of the Gods (1988): Character designer, Key animator
- Saint Seiya: Warriors of the Final Holy Battle (1989): Character designer, Key animator
- Blue Legend – Shoot! (1990): Character designer, Key animator
- GeGeGe no Kitarō: Daikaijū (1996): Character designer, Key animator
- Yu-Gi-Oh! (1999): Character designer

=== OVAs ===
* indicates single-episode OVA.

Year(s)	Title	Character designer	Animation director	Key animator
1986	Cowardly Venus *	No	Yes	Yes
1989–1990	Fūma no Kojirō	Yes ‡	No	No
1991	Dragon Fist *	Yes ‡	No	No
1991–1992	Condition Green	Yes ‡	No	No
1992	Babel II	Yes ‡	No	No
1992	Fūma Hanran *	Yes ‡	No	Yes
1995–2004	The Human Revolution	Yes ‡	Yes (Note: Chief animation director (with Shingo Araki))	No
1998	Gekiganger III *	No	No	Yes
2002–2008	Saint Seiya: The Hades Chapter	Yes ‡	Yes (Note: Chief animation director (with Shingo Araki))	Yes

=== Books ===
- Alexandria, Illustrator – The saga is in 9 volumes, each containing 10 b/w illustrations. Volumes 1-2-3-5-6 contains also full colour illustrations. The books' covers also are illustrated by Michi Himeno.
