= Ulysses 31 =

French–Japanese–Luxembourgian animated television series

- Genre: Science fantasy
- Created by: Nina Wolmark; Jean Chalopin
- Based on: Odyssey by Homer
- Written by: Nina Wolmark; Jean Chalopin
- Directed by: Tadao Nagahama
- Voices of: Matt Birman; Adrian Knight; Anick Faris; Kelly Ricard; Howard Ryshpan; Vlasta Vrána
- Countries of origin: France; Japan; Luxembourg
- Original language: French
- No. of episodes: 26

Production
- Producers: Jean Chalopin; Yutaka Fujioka
- Running time: 24–25 minutes
- Production companies: DIC Audiovisuel; Tokyo Movie Shinsha

Original release
- Network: FR3
- Release: 3 October 1981 – 3 April 1982

Ulysses 31 (Japanese: 宇宙伝説ユリシーズ31(サーティーワン), Hepburn: Uchū Densetsu Yurishīzu Sātīwan; lit. "Space Legend Ulysses 31", French: Ulysse 31) is a French–Japanese–Luxembourgian animated series based on the Greek mythology of Odysseus (known as "Ulixes" or "Ulysses" in Latin), set in the 31st century. It was produced by DIC Audiovisuel and Tokyo Movie Shinsha, in co-production with FR3 and RTL. The series comprises 26 half-hour episodes.

== Plot ==
The series follows the struggles of Ulysses and his crew against the divine entities that rule the universe, the ancient gods from Greek mythology. The Gods of Olympus are angered when Ulysses, commander of the giant spaceship Odyssey, kills the giant Cyclops to save a group of enslaved children, including his son. Zeus sentences Ulysses to travel the universe with his crew frozen until he finds the Kingdom of Hades, at which point his crew will be revived and he will be able to return to Earth. Along the way they encounter numerous other famous figures from Greek mythology, given a futuristic twist.

Cast and characters
Character	Japan (original cast)	Japan (1992 NHK BS-2 cast)	France (original cast)	English (original cast)	Biography
Ulysses (ユリシーズ, Yurishīzu)	Osamu Kobayashi	Masane Tsukayama	Claude Giraud	Matt Birman	The main character and captain of the Odyssey. A well regarded and very esteemed space explorer and adventurer, Ulysses achieved the solar peace (a monumental accomplishment as implied in the series) becoming even more celebrated. Some time later he accidentally became the target of the Olympian gods' revenge by slaying the giant Cyclops, Poseidon's creature, in order to save the lives of his son Telemachus, Yumi and her brother Numinor. His weapon is a laser pistol that conceals an energy blade, complemented by an energy shield and a belt that allows him to fly. Ulysses is brave, noble, determined, and will stop at nothing to defeat the gods.
Telemachus (テレマーク, Teremāku)	Yū Mizushima	Nobuo Tobita	Fabrice Josso / Jackie Berger	Adrian Knight	The son of Ulysses and second in command for most of the voyage, he is Yumi's friend and protector. He is a skilled pilot, and his weapon is a high-tech magnetic slingshot.
Yumi (ユミ, Yumi) (Thémis in the original French dub, after Themis the ancient Titan)	Sumi Shimamoto	Akiko Yajima	Séverine Morisot	Anick Faris	A light blue-skinned humanoid alien girl from the white planet, Zotra, she is the younger sister of Numinor and possesses telepathic powers. She is saved from being sacrificed to the Cyclops, along with Telemachus and her older brother, by Ulysses. She exhibits telekinesis and is immune to fire. Although physically frail, she is very intelligent and courageous. Zotrians, aside from blue skin, have snow-white hair, pointed ears, and slanted eyes with cat-like vertical pupils.
Nono (ノノ, Nono)	Mayumi Tanaka	Miki Narahashi	Jacques Ebner	Howard Ryshpan	The small red robotic companion of Telemachus. Fond of eating nuts and nails, he is a trusty friend who was given to Telemachus as a birthday present. He is skilled at machinery repair and possesses tremendous physical strength.
Zeus (ゼウス, Zeusu)	Shōzō Hirabayashi	Kan Tokumaru	Jean Topart	Vlasta Vrána	The god of gods, persecutor of Ulysses.
Shirka (シルカ, Shiruka)			Évelyne Séléna / Sylvie Moreau	Kelly Ricard	The Odyssey's main computer, with a deep female voice.
Numinor (ユマイオス, Yumaiosu) (Noumaïos in the original French dub)					A Zotrian teenager and older brother of Yumi, he is saved by Ulysses from being sacrificed to the Cyclops. He is in suspended animation along with the rest of the crew for most of the series. His Japanese name Yumaiosu is the katakana orthography of English pronunciation of Eumaeus, the pig-guardian of Odysseus in Homer's poem.
Poseidon (ポセイドン, Poseidon)					The god of the Seas, enraged by Ulysses's killing of his creature, the Cyclops. He wields a trident, the symbol of his power, and his servants pilot ships that are shaped like a trident.
Hades (アデス, Adesu)					The ruling god of the Underworld. Ulysses must find his realm to find the way back to Earth.

== Production ==
In 1980, DIC Audiovisuel, Tokyo Movie Shinsha, and Telecom Animation Film produced a pilot for the series, simply titled "Ulysses 31". Although there was a Japanese VHS release of the series by King Records in 1986, the pilot never saw an official home release and was used for internal use only.

The pilot has long been considered as only been recorded in Japanese, until a French searcher discovered a copy of the French version in July 2015, then a copy of the English-dubbed version in June 2022.

The story is virtually identical to episode one of the finished series, but the story was the only thing that was kept. Some characters underwent major redesigns from a typical anime design to the finished series, which is a mix of Japanese anime style and European art based on the appearance of classical Greek sculpture. Renowned Japanese illustrators and animators Shingo Araki and Michi Himeno, who have worked in anime adaptations of famous manga (such as Masami Kurumada's Saint Seiya, Fūma no Kojirō, Ring ni Kakero, Riyoko Ikeda's Versailles no Bara, and UFO Robo Grendizer OVA) were responsible for the finished series' character designs, animation routines, and visual style.

=== Soundtrack ===
Most of the original soundtrack was composed by Denny Crockett and Ike Egan. Six additional themes were composed by Shuki Levy and Haim Saban: "Potpourri", "Final Glory", "Space Traffic", "Ulysse Meets Ulysse", "Mermaids", and "Change of Time (Theme of Chronos)".

The Japanese version has a different soundtrack, opening with "Ginga Densetsu Odyssey" (銀河伝説オデッセイ, Ginga Densetsu Odissei; Galactic Legend Odyssey) and closing with "Ai. Toki no Kanata ni" (愛･時の彼方に; Love, Over the Other Side of Time), both by Tomoaki Taka. The music was composed by Wakakusa Kei, who made the soundtrack in both the series and pilot that was produced in 1980. An official soundtrack was released in 1986 on vinyl and on CD in 1988 by King Records.

== Release ==
In the United States, the show was broadcast as a half-hour segment in the 1986 anthology series Kideo TV.

In the United Kingdom, it first aired on BBC One on November 7, 1985. In the Republic of Ireland, the show was aired on RTÉ One in 1985. Ulysses 31 was repeated on the European satellite broadcaster The Children's Channel in 1992, as part of an afternoon animation block that also included Clémentine and Widget. The entire series was released in English in a complete DVD box set in the UK by Contender Entertainment, and in Australia by Madman Entertainment. In the United States, one DVD titled Ulysses 31: The Mysteries of Time was released, containing only four selected episodes. The rights, like most of DIC's other programs, were originally owned by WildBrain, through its in-name-only unit, Cookie Jar Entertainment (which WildBrain's ownership of the series reverted to creators, Nina Wolmark and Jean Chalopin). (Note: Excludes Japan (which was owned by WildBrain CPLG and TMS Entertainment Europe).)

It also aired on Cartoon Network in the 1992 NHK BS-2 Japanese version.

The series was remastered in HD for broadcast in French-language channel Mangas, and is scheduled to be released on Blu-ray for the first time.
