= List of Saint Seiya characters =

This article comprises a list of characters that play a role in Saint Seiya (also known as Knights of the Zodiac) and its canonical sequel, Saint Seiya: Next Dimension, two manga series created, written and illustrated by Masami Kurumada.

The plot of Saint Seiya begins in 1986, spanning until 1990, and follows a group of five mystical warriors called Bronze Saints as they battle in the name of the goddess Athena against agents of evil who seek to rule the Earth. Their main enemy in the first arc of the story is the traitorous Gemini Gold Saint Saga, who has murdered the representative of Athena and taken his place as leader of the Saints. In the second arc, the Bronze Saints are confronted with the God of the Seas, Poseidon, who kidnaps the mortal reincarnation of Athena and threatens to flood the world with incessant rain to cleanse it of the evils of mankind. Their final enemy, who appears in the third and final arc of the series, is the God of the Underworld, Hades, whom Athena has fought since the age of myth.

Saint Seiya: Next Dimension acts both as a prequel and an official sequel to the first series. It details the aftermath of the war against Hades and starts with Athena seeking help from the Gods of Olympus and from Chronos to save Pegasus Seiya from Hades' sword curse by travelling back to the 18th century. The two main antagonists are the troops of the Goddess of the Moon, Artemis, in the 20th century storyline, and the incarnation of Hades in the 18th century.

== Protagonists ==
=== Pegasus Seiya ===
Voiced by: Tōru Furuya (Japanese); Tim Hamaguchi (DiC), Bryson Baugus (Netflix) (English)

Pegasus Seiya (天馬星座(ぺガサス)の星矢, Pegasasu no Seiya) is the Bronze Saint of Pegasus in the 20th century, the titular character and main protagonist of the Saint Seiya franchise. An orphaned child later revealed to be one of Mitsumasa Kido's sons, he was separated from his older sister Seika and sent to Greece to become a Saint, a soldier of the goddess Athena. Initially motivated by the desire to rejoin his sister, he eventually discovers he has protected Athena for millennia, his soul returning every time she reincarnates to assist her in the battles against the evil agents that threaten the Earth. As a warrior of immense might, Seiya achieves victory in impossible battles, occasionally donning the Sagittarius Gold Cloth before particularly challenging opponents. He defeats the gods Poseidon and Hades, although the latter Seiya is cursed by Hades's sword at the end of the series to stop his cycle of rebirth. He is left in a comatose state which Athena seeks to revert Hades's curse in the canonical sequel Next Dimension. Seiya is proclaimed as the future Gold Saint of the Sagittarius successor to Sagittarius Aiolos.

=== Dragon Shiryu ===
Voiced by: Hirotaka Suzuoki (Japanese); Dan Warry-Smith (DiC), Blake Shepard (Netflix) (English)

Dragon Shiryu (龍星座(ドラゴン)の紫龍, Doragon no Shiryū) is the Bronze Saint protected by the constellation of Draco the Dragon, considered the calmest and most collected of the protagonists. As one of Mitsumada Kido's sons, he was sent at an early age to the Five Old Peaks of Rozan to train under the Libra Gold Saint and acquire the Dragon Cloth. This Cloth is known for possessing the strongest fist and shield. After he returns to Japan, Shiryu becomes involved in the battles to recover the Gold Cloth from Ikki and the Black Saints, and eventually discovers that Saori Kido is the goddess Athena whom he swore to protect. In the ensuing battle against the Silver Saint Perseus Algol, Shiryu is forced to blind himself to achieve victory. He recovers his sight upon awakening his seventh sense during the fight against Cancer Deathmask, but later loses it a second time while facing Poseidon's General Chrysaor Krishna. More than once, he dons the Libra Gold Cloth when confronting a particularly powerful opponent. In the Next Dimension official sequel of the manga of Saint Seiya, Shiryu and Chunli have adopted a baby whom they named Shoryu. Then, he goes back in time with Hyoga, to the time of the previous Holy War against Hades in the eighteenth century, in order to help Saori / Athena save Seiya's life, who is cursed by the sword of the god of the underworld. Shiryu is proclaimed as the future Gold Saint of Libra successor to Libra Dohko, from the Gold Saint of the eighteenth century Libra Dohko (Young)

=== Cygnus Hyoga ===
Voiced by: Kōichi Hashimoto (Japanese); Stuart Stone (DiC), Patrick Poole (Netflix) (English)

Cygnus Hyoga (白鳥星座(キグナス)の氷河, Kigunasu no Hyōga), also known as Swan Hyoga in several international adaptations, is the Bronze Saint of Cygnus. He was born in the fictional village of Kohoutek, in eastern Siberia, which, at the time when Kurumada wrote and drew his manga, was in the Soviet Union. His mastery over his Cosmo grants him the ability to create ice and snow at temperatures as low as absolute zero by stopping subatomic particles. Hyoga is often portrayed wearing a cross and rosary of the Northern Cross, another name for the Cygnus constellation. Calm by nature, he displays a seemingly emotionless exterior, but a more tender side of his character emerges on occasions, such as when he expresses his gratitude to Andromeda Shun for having saved his life and his undying devotion to his mentor Aquarius Camus. He first appears in the series as he receives an order from Sanctuary to eliminate his fellow Bronze Saints, but he quickly abandons this mission when he discovers the truth about Saori Kido's identity and joins her in the battles against her enemies. While in Poseidon's Undersea Temple, he reencounters Kraken Isaac, a fellow apprentice of Camus. To repay an old debt to the Mariner, Hyoga sacrifices one of his eyes. He occasionally dons the Aquarius Gold Cloth. In the anime adaptation, he was given a different master: an original character referred to as the Crystal Saint, who was, in turn, Aquarius Camus's apprentice. In Japan, Hyoga is a popular character, ranking second in the main character polls of the Bronze Saints. In the Next Dimension official sequel of the manga of Saint Seiya, Hyoga goes back in time with Shiryu, to the time of the previous Holy War against Hades in the eighteenth century, in order to help Saori / Athena save Seiya's life, who is cursed by the sword of the god of the underworld. Hyoga is proclaimed as the future Gold Saint of Aquarius successor to Aquarius Camus, from the Gold Saint of the eighteenth century Aquarius Mystoria

=== Andromeda Shun ===
Voiced by: Ryō Horikawa (Japanese); Andrew Sabiston (DiC), Blake Jackson (Netflix) (English)

Andromeda Shun (アンドロメダ星座(アンドロメダ)の瞬, Andoromeda no Shun) is the Bronze Saint of Andromeda and Phoenix Ikki's younger brother, although he shares the same father as the rest of the main Bronze Saints. He trained at Andromeda Island under the Silver Saint Cepheus Daidalos and returned to Japan after earning his Cloth, hoping to be reunited with Ikki. He helps Athena reclaim Sanctuary and later becomes involved in the battles against Poseidon and his Generals. In the final arc, it is revealed that the necklace he has carried since he was a baby was given to him by Pandora, to mark his body as Hades's future container. Ikki manages to free him after the god takes hold of his body and both follow Athena to Elysion, where Shun briefly dons the Virgo Gold Cloth and helps to finally defeat Hades. In Next Dimension(canonical sequel and prequel), Shun accompanies Athena to the 18th century, to save Seiya from the curse of Hades's sword. There, he joins forces with the former Pegasus Saint, Tenma, to save the helpless goddess from Hades's Specters. Shun is proclaimed as the future Gold Saint of Virgo successor to Virgo Shaka. In the anime adaptation, his master's name was changed to Albiore.

=== Phoenix Ikki ===
Voiced by: Hideyuki Hori (Japanese); Scott McCord (DiC), Adam Gibbs (Netflix) (English)

Phoenix Ikki (鳳凰星座(フェニクス)の一輝, Fenikkusu no Ikki) is the Bronze Saint of the Phoenix constellation and Shun's older brother. He trained at the hellish Death Queen Island under Guilty, which turned him into a loner, cold and harsh. Ikki first appears as an main antagonist of the Black Saints arc, as the leader of the Black Saints who is set on taking the Sagittarius Gold Cloth for himself and destroying the other Bronze Saints for revenge against the Graude Foundation. He later overcomes his hate and becomes an ally to Athena and the Bronze Saints, often arriving at critical moments to save them from certain death. Born under the sign of Leo, Ikki dons the Leo Gold Cloth once, during the fight against the twin gods Hypnos and Thanatos in Elysion. In Saint Seiya: Next Dimension, the ongoing canonical sequel and prequel to Saint Seiya authored by Kurumada that deals with the aftermath of the war against Hades, after Athena visits Mount Olympus to meet her sister Artemis and ask for her help to cure Seiya from the curse Hades inflicted on him, Andromeda Shun is attacked by Artemis's soldiers, the Satellites, and their commander Lascoumoune. Shun manages to defeat the Satellites, but not Lascoumoune, who nearly takes his life. Ikki then intervenes to protect his brother and defeats the commander of the Satellites. Afterwards, he follows Athena and Shun into the past, to the war against Hades that took place in the eighteenth century. Ikki is proclaimed as the future Gold Saint of the Leo successor to Leo Aiolia, from the Gold Saint of the eighteenth century Leo Kaiser

=== Saori Kido / Athena ===
Voiced by: Keiko Han (Japanese); Stacey DePass (DiC), Emily Neves (Netflix) (English)

Saori Kido (城戸 紗織, Kido Saori), also known as Princess Sienna Kido in some English versions of the series, is the reincarnation of the Greek Goddess of War, Wisdom, Justice and Heroic Endeavor, divine princess and ever Greek Empress and Greek and Olympian Princess, Athena (女神(アテナ), Atena), in the 20th century. Based on the Greek goddess of the same name, she is the daughter of Zeus and younger sister of Artemis and Apollo. She usually carries a golden staff representing Nike, the Goddess of Victory, and a shield which can eliminate all evil and owns a powerful Divine Cloth. She is reborn approximately every 250 years to protect the Earth from evil with the help of her loyal Saints. While still a baby, Gemini Saga in his evil side attempts to kill her, but Sagittarius Aiolos saves her life and delivers her to Mitsumasa Kido, who raises her in secret in Japan. Thirteen years later, after Mitsumasa's death, Saori gathers the Bronze Saints that the Graude Foundation trained and battles to reclaim Sanctuary from Saga's control. During the Poseidon arc, she offers to be locked inside the main pillar in Poseidon's Undersea Temple while it fills with water that would have otherwise flooded the Earth. After her Saints save her, she reseals Poseidon's soul. In the Hades arc, she infiltrates the Underworld and follows his real enemy Hades to Elysion, where she also kills the evil god. In Next Dimension, hoping to save Pegasus Seiya's life from the curse cast on him by Hades's sword, Saori travels to Olympus to ask for Chronos's help. The God of Time sends her back to the 18th century war against Hades, as per her request, but she appears in the past as a helpless baby at the mercy of her enemies.

In the latest chapters of Next Dimension, author Kurumada introduces Sasha (サーシャ, Sāsha), Athena's previous incarnation, who descended to Earth once again during the 18th century.

=== Sasha / Athena ===
Voiced by: Aya Hirano

Athena's reincarnation in the 18th century, an orphaned young girl living in the european city of Firanzo, Alone's childhood friend and Tenma's childhood crush. Sanctuary awaited for her advent, as victory can't be achieved in a War of the gods without the reincarnation of Athena. After the arrival of Athena Saori Kido in the 18th century, Sasha fell into a deep sleep due to the great space time distortion caused by Saori's travel back in time; and she has since been nicknamed " The Sleeping Princess". She is marked for assassination by Pandora who sends Hades' Specters to fulfill that objective, among them the powerful Papillon Giuletta. Sasha's life is protected by Pegasus Tenma who, after a fierce fight, defeats her and then faces the challenge of the mighty Wyvern Chagall. Sasha is later instrumental in the destroying of Hades' sword curse on Seiya in 1990 and joining Athena Saori Kido in sending the Bronze Saints back to their era.

=== Pegasus Tenma ===
Voiced by: Tetsuya Kakihara (Japanese); Arnie Pantoja (Netflix) (English)

Trained to be the Pegasus Saint by Crateris Suikyō, Pegasus Tenma (天馬星座(ペガサス)の天馬, Pegasasu no Tenma) is Pegasus Seiya's incarnation in the 18th century, Alone's best friend and Sasha's childhood crush. After he and Alone escape from Libra Dohko and Aries Shion, Tenma realizes that his friend has become Hades. He vows to protect Alone, but, when he tries to make him remember who he is, Pandora and some Skeleton soldiers intervene and Tenma has to be saved by Dohko and Shion. The trio is then beset by Griffon Vermeer and Suikyō, who reveals himself as the Garuda Specter. The Saints manage to escape after Pandora summons the Specters and drink water from the Crateris Cloth to revitalize themselves. There, Tenma sees his future incernation: Seiya in a wheelchair. Returning to Sanctuary with Dohko and Shion, Tenma later encounters Andromeda Shun and the two begin to climb the Twelve Temples, joining forces to protect the infant time-traveling Athena.

An alternate version of Tenma makes an appearance in the spin-off Saint Seiya: The Lost Canvas, where his name is spelled only in katakana.

=== Other Saints ===
Athena's army is composed of warriors known as Saints, who for millennia have battled to protect the goddess and the ideals she stands for. They inhabit the Sanctuary and possess superhuman powers thanks to their Cosmo, the energy of the Big Bang that dwells inside every being. They are divided into three hierarchical ranks – Bronze, Silver and Gold – and wear armors that are linked to the constellations named Cloths. Although all Saints have sworn allegiance to the goddess, Kurumada first presented most of them in an antagonistic role.

== Antagonists ==
The Saint Seiya series features a variety of powerful antagonists. The Black Saints, Blue Warriors, and Poseidon's Mariners are key enemies from the Marine Realm, each serving under the influence of malevolent gods like Poseidon. The Underworld Realm brings forth the Specters, dark warriors loyal to Hades, while the Heavenly Realm is home to the ruthless Angels. The Lunar Realm, along with the Satellites, presents its own formidable threats, as does the Sun Realm, which harbors its own set of powerful adversaries. These diverse forces challenge the Saints as they battle across different mythological planes.

The first characters to appear in an antagonistic role are the Black Saints, servants of Phoenix Ikki on his quest to kill all the Bronze Saints. The second were most of the Silver and Gold Saints, deceived by the dark personality of the Gemini Gold Saint Saga. The short story dedicated to Hyōga that followed the Sanctuary arc of the manga introduced the Blue Warriors from the icy lands of Bluegrad. Afterwards, most antagonists were various deities from Greek mythology: Poseidon and Hades, in the original Saint Seiya, and the Olympians of the Heavenly Realm, in Saint Seiya: Next Dimension. The anime adaptation of the manga introduced several other antagonists, such as the Ghost Saints and Odin's God Warriors.

== Support characters ==
Alone (アローン, Arōn)
Hades' chosen vessel in the 18th century, with the purest soul on earth. Prior to the Holy war, he was best friends with Pegasus Tenma since childhood. He first met Tenma during a snowstorm one night, in an abandoned shack where they both sought refuge. Tenma deceived Alone at first so that he could steal his belongings, but was stopped by Suikyō. As Suikyō was going to kill Tenma for theft, Alone lied and said he had given his bag to Tenma. Suikyō was eventually convinced and told Tenma he was now in debt to Alone and should therefore guard Alone for the rest of his life. At the start of the war, he could feel that darkness was headed his way, and that it came after him. He and Tenma escaped from Libra Dohko and Aries Shion, and ended up outside a small mausoleum. As Tenma went back to retrieve his Cloth, a voice called for Alone inside the mausoleum. As he entered, he found Hades' Sword stuck in the ground. It was then that Pandora showed herself and convinced Alone of grabbing the hilt of the sword. Alone started plunging into darkness and ignored Tenma as he strode towards Hades' Castle.
Appendix Kiki (アッペンデックスの貴鬼, Appendekkusu no Kiki)
Voiced by: Hiroko Emori (Japanese); Karen Hatch (English)
Apprentice under Aries Mu. Also known as Appendix Kiki. Like his master and grandmaster, Kiki also bears the ornaments on his forehead and is the youngest of the people of the continent of Mu. He never fights, but can use powerful telekinesis against normal humans, as well as teleport himself, and can tell when the cloths are damaged. In the Poseidon arc, he was given the duty of bringing the Libra Cloth to all the Bronze Saints, fulfilling it valiantly even at the risk of his life.
Cassios (カシオス, Kashiosu)
Voiced by: Banjo Ginga (Japanese); Matt Culpepper (English)
Formerly a Saint apprentice under Ophiuchus Shaina. During the final fight for the Pegasus Cloth and the status of Saint, Seiya cut off one of his ears, and he hated Seiya for it ever since. Cassios had great respect and affection toward Shaina; however, he realizes that Shaina had affection toward Seiya. Motivated by this, he takes Seiya's place and dies during the fight with Leo Aiolia in order to wake the Leo Gold Saint from the control of Saga's Dellusional Demon's Emperor Fist. In the anime adaptation, he was also the younger brother of Docrates, an anime-only character.
Esmeralda (エスメラルダ, Esumeraruda)
Voiced by: Chisato Nakajima
She was sold as a work slave to an abusive local farmer for only three bags of grain. When Ikki first encountered her, he mistook her for Shun, because she and Shun shared the same facial features with the only differences being hair color and gender. She was killed by Guilty, Ikki's master, in order to provoke Ikki into drawing power from hatred. In the anime adaptation her background is the same, with the addition of being Guilty's daughter.
Eurydice (ユリディース, Yuridīsu)
Voiced by: Yuko Nagashima
Lyra Orphée's lover, she enjoyed great happiness at the Saint's side on Earth, until the day of her untimely death because of a snake bite. Crushed by her demise, Orphée descended to the Underworld to bargain for her soul with Hades. Touched by the Saint's pleas and melody, she was allowed to return to Earth by the deity, only to be thwarted by Sphinx Pharaoh. She thus was condemned to remain bound to the Underworld half-turned into stone, and later helped Seiya and Shun to unearth Orphée's seemingly forgotten loyalty to Athena.
Guilty (謎の聖闘士(セイント) ギルティー, Nazo no Seinto Girutī)
Voiced by: Hidekatsu Shibata
Master of Phoenix Ikki during his stance on Death Queen Island. Harsh and heartless, and concealing his features behind a fearsome mask, Guilty employed brutal methods in Ikki's training, to force him to become a being of pure hate, to be able to wield the power of the Phoenix Bronze Cloth. Guilty was responsible for Esmeralda's death, and died at the hands of Ikki, as his final trial to become a Saint, not before revealing to Ikki the secret of his birth. Also known as the mysterious Saint, Masami Kurumada never revealed Guilty's destined constellation.
Hell's Watchdog Cerberus (地獄の番犬 ケルベロス, Jigoku no Banken Keruberosu)
The enormous, three-headed demonic watchdog guarding the entrance to the Underworld. Savage, grotesque in appearance and emitting a foul stench, it relentlessly devoured souls that belonged to greedy people in life. Sphinx Pharaoh was in charge of taking care of the creature, and it was defeated temporarily by Pegasus Seiya and Andromeda Shun.
Miho (美穂)
Voiced by: Naoko Watanabe (Japanese); Sasha Paysinger (English)
Seiya's fellow orphan and childhood friend, she works at the orphanage where she and Seiya, along with his sister Seika lived before Seiya was taken away. Miho is in love with Seiya to some degree, and in a sense represents the point of view of the normal people who are mere witnesses to the struggles among the gods.
Mitsumasa Kido (城戸 光政, Kido Mitsumasa)
Voiced by: Kōhei Miyauchi (Japanese); Marty Fleck (English)
Foster-grandfather of Saori who adopted her and took her to Japan after finding a dying Sagittarius Gold Saint Aiolos in Sanctuary. In the manga, it was revealed that he was actually the birth father of all the orphans he sent around the world to be trained as Saints. In the anime, he merely took the children from various orphanages, and sent them for their training. Just before he died, he told Saori all the truth regarding the encounter with Aiolos in Sanctuary and her divine origins and purpose of her birth in this era. He is known as Lord Nobu in some English versions.
Natasha (ナターシャ, Natāsha)
Voiced by: Akiko Tsuboi
One of Mitsumasa Kido's women in the manga and late mother of Cygnus Hyōga. After dying in a shipwreck, her remains were preserved intact by the gelid waters of the Siberian seas. She's also alternatively known, both in the manga and anime adaptation, as Hyōga's Mama (氷河の母親, Hyōga no Māma). Kurumada later introduced a character of the same name in the short story arc dedicated to Hyōga in the thirteenth volume of the manga, sister to Alexei, leader of the Blue Warriors.
Pegasus (ペガサス, Pegasasu)
Tenma's loyal horse and steed. He saved Shion's, Dohko's, and Tenma's lives, by protecting them from the Skeleton soldiers.
Seika (星華)
Voiced by: Yuriko Yamamoto, Satsuki Yukino (OVA)
Seiya's older sister, whom he lost contact with when he was sent to Greece to be trained as a Saint. After Seiya was taken away, she wandered the world looking for him. It was long implied that Marin, Seiya's mentor, could be Seika, and some characters, including Seiya, thought it was possibly true. Marin and Seika even shared the same physical characteristics: same age, same birthdate, same height, same birthplace. Also, Marin has a brother she lost and was looking for. Seika resurfaced as a separate character in the Hades chapter, completely amnesiac, after having followed Seiya all the way to Greece alone. It was Seika's voice that, more than any other, urged Seiya on in his fight against Thanatos after regain his memories by Seiya's voice. It is then revealed in the final arc of Kurumada's manga that Seika and Marin are not the same person.
Shōryū (翔龍)
A new character introduced by Kurumada in Next Dimension, an orphaned baby, found in the Five Old Peaks fairylands of Lushan, by Shunrei. He is very fond of Shiryū.
Shunrei (春麗, Shunrei, Pinyin: Chun Li)
Voiced by: Yumiko Shibata, Eriko Sato (OVA) (Japanese); Ai Bandō (Elysion OVA), Kimberly Prause (English)
Shunrei was an abandoned orphan found by Libra Dohko in Rozan, China. She cares deeply for Shiryū, and her prayers for Shiryū's safety in battle often help him through his darkest hours, particularly against Cancer Deathmask. She always carries Shiryū in her heart and her thoughts, and he reciprocates her feelings, with both being a strong presence in each other's lives.
Suishō (水清)
Garuda Suikyō's younger brother. The Specter is forced to reminisce about him after suffering the effects of Phoenix Ikki's Phoenix Demonic Illusion Attack. Suishō was afflicted by a terminal disease, thus Hades offered Suikyō to save his brother's life in exchange of loyalty to him. Suishō died shortly after the deity's offering. Suishō's background remains to be revealed in further detail by Kurumada.
The Pope of the 18th century (前聖戦の教皇, Zenseisen no Kyōkō)
The Pope ruling Sanctuary in the 18th century, a survivor of the Holy War against Hades in the 15th century. He grants Shion and Dohko the rank of Gold Saints and the right to don the Aries and Libra Gold Cloths. He also foresees Hades' return to Earth and prepares Sanctuary to face such event. A false Pope, who swore allegiance to Hades also plays a role in the storyline, whether he and the legitimate Pope are the same person, still remains to be revealed by Kurumada.
Tokumaru Tatsumi (辰巳 徳丸, Tatsumi Tokumaru)
Voiced by: Yukitoshi Hori, Ron Howald
Saori's butler, bodyguard and right-hand man. Trusted man of Mitsumasa Kido and a black belt, third dan in Kendō. He was in charge of overseeing the orphans who were to be sent out all over the world to train and become Bronze Saints, and due to his extreme severity and at times downright abusive behavior, most of them were resentful towards him. He always tried to be strong and protect Saori, but even the Sanctuary soldiers can defeat him. (Not without struggle, however, as he offered considerable resistance for an outnumbered man). He starts as a rather daunting and abusive retainer for the future Saints, but he is in truth a man who is honor-bound to protect Saori, and ultimately is the series' comic relief.
Yakov (ヤコフ, Yakofu)
Voiced by: Tomiko Suzuki
A young boy from Kohoutek village, in Eastern Siberia, neighbor and good friend of Cygnus Hyōga. He watches over Natasha's eternal sleep when Hyōga is absent due to his responsibilities as a Saint. He helps Hyōga in various domestic tasks and also assisted the Saint in his escape from the Blue Warriors' imprisonment.

=== Other deities ===
Ares (アレス, Aresu)
Briefly mentioned in the first chapter of Kurumada's manga, the fierce and bloodthirsty god of war, who battled Athena and her Saints millennia ago, in the ages of myth.
Kronos (クロノス, Kuronosu) and Rhea (レア, Rea)
Briefly mentioned by Libra Dohko in vol.27 of Kurumada's manga, the mighty Titans, whose union gave birth to Hades, Poseidon and Zeus in the ages of myth.
Cupid (キューピッド, Kyūpiddo)
Mentioned by Thanatos in vol. 27 of Kurumada's manga, attributing the nymphs' agitation caused by Pegasus Seiya, to his usual mischief.
Giants (ギガース, Gigāsu)
Mentioned briefly in the first chapter of the manga; the ancient race of giants, who battled Athena and her army in the ages of myth in a conflict that became known as the Gigantomachia in Greek myths.
Chronos, the God of Time (時の神・クロノス, Toki no Kami Kuronosu)
The god who rules time. Said to be shapeless and hidden within the universe, and far more powerful than the rest of deities. Athena meets with him in the gate to time-space. Chronos helps Athena to return to the era of the previous Holy War in order to remove Hades' curse from Seiya, turning her into a baby.
Goddess of Victory Nike (勝利の女神・ニケ, Shōri no Megami Nike)
The Greek Goddess of victory, who is always at Athena's side, manifested in the form of her golden staff, leading her and the Saints to triumph. Her true form is visible in the giant Athena Parthenos statue in Sanctuary.
Heavenly Emperor Zeus (天帝・ゼウス, Tentei Zeusu)
Father of Apollo, Artemis and Athena, the Supreme God of the Olympus and God of the Heavens. His participation is to date, reduced to only mentions by other characters and in background narrative. During Athena's trial, Apollon, the God of the Sun explains he is forced to stop her transgressions to protect her and Earth from their father Zeus' all-consuming wrath.
Apollo, the God of the Sun (太陽神・アポロン, Taiyōshin Aporon)
He is first mentioned in passing when Athena visits her older sister Artemis, the Goddess of the Moon, and is said to merely watch over the time of the day. He is finally revealed by author Kurumada in the final installments of Next Dimension, as the God of the Sun, older brother of Artemis and Athena and son of Zeus; who has descended to pass judgment on his younger sister and her Bronze Saints, for their transgressions and constant defiance of the gods. Even though Apollo at first shows hostility towards Athena and her Bronze Saints, he does it out of concern for his younger sister and to protect Earth from their father Zeus' wrath; as he later shows mercy and spares Athena's and her Bronze Saints' lives removing their memories of their past connection and their time together.
Buddha (仏陀, Budda)
Voiced by: Tomomichi Nishimura
An enlightened being with whom Shaka conversed during his childhood, and taught him the true value of life. Although Kurumada hints at the true identity of this being as Siddharta Gautama, the Supreme Buddha, he doesn't confirm neither he is Buddha Gautama nor if he was who instructed Shaka in the ways of the Saints.
The Nymphs (妖精(ニンフ), Ninfu)
Voiced by: Yui Kano
The minor divine spirits in Elysion, who delight Thanatos with their beautiful voice and music.

=== Characters outside the manga and the anime ===
Considered canonical within the universe of Saint Seiya, as they were created by Masami Kurumada, these characters were not introduced in his manga, but instead in the first Saint Seiya film. They were also featured in the musical Saint Seiya: Super Musical of 2011, which is based on the same film. They are five former Silver Saints, collectively known as the Ghost Saints: Southern Cross Khristós (voiced by Ryūsei Nakao in the film and played by Yūki Fujiwara in the musical); Sagitta Maya, predecessor of Sagitta Ptolemy (voiced by Michitaka Kobayashi and played by Yūki Matsuoka); Scutum Jan (voiced by Keiichi Nanba and played by Takeshi Hayashino); Lyra Orpheus, predecessor of Lyra Orphée (voiced by Yūji Mitsuya and played by Yasuka Saitoh); and Orion Jäger (voiced by Yū Mizushima and played by Yutaka Matsuzaki).

Kurumada contributed to designing the looks of the God Warriors of Odin in 1988's Saint Seiya: The Heated Battle of the Gods, but had virtually no involvement in the conceptual development and design of Abel and his three Corona Saints in 1988's Saint Seiya: Legend of Crimson Youth or of Lucifer and the Fallen Angels in Saint Seiya: Warriors of the Final Holy Battle. On the other hand, the 2004 film Saint Seiya Heaven Chapter: Overture was based on an original story by Kurumada. Since the discontinuation of the project, however, the characters and events of that film have since been replaced in the canonical continuity of the series by those found in Next Dimension.

== Anime-only characters ==
The anime adaptation of Saint Seiya features several original characters. Author Masami Kurumada was not involved in their creation process. Although these characters had a participation in the storyline to some extent, virtually all of them were later retconned from the continuity of the anime itself to keep it closer to the manga. They range from support to antagonistic characters.

This article comprises a list of characters that do not exist in Masami Kurumada's Saint Seiya manga and are found only in its anime adaptation, therefore they remain out of the canon of the fictional universe. Saint Seiya author Kurumada was not involved in their creation process, design or conceptualization and although these characters had a participation in the storyline to some extent, they have now been retconned from the continuity of the anime adaptation to keep it closer to Kurumada's manga. They range from support secondary characters to various ally or antagonistic factions.

=== Steel Saints ===
Steel Saints (鋼鉄聖闘士(スチールセイント), Suchīru Seinto)
Voiced by: Shigeru Nakahara (Shō), Mie Suzuki (Daichi), Hōchū Ōtsuka (Ushio) (Japanese); Mark X. Laskowski (Sho), Greg Ayres (Daichi), Christopher Ayres (Ushio) (English)
The Steel Saints' Steel Cloth (鋼鉄聖衣(スチールクロス), Suchīru Kurosu) armors were created by Dr. Asamori, who was supported at the beginning by Mitsumasa Kido. Unlike the other Saints, the Steel Saints' powers come from their robotic armors and not from their Cosmo. As they are non-existent in Kurumada's manga, they were added to the Silver Saint arc, before the Bronze Saints travel to the Sanctuary in Greece. Daichi (大地) dons the Land Cloth (ランドクロス, Rando Kurosu; Fox Cloth), which is able to generate earthquakes. Ushio (潮) dons the Marine Cloth (マリンクロス, Marin Kurosu; Swordfish Cloth) which is able to produce sound waves. Shō (翔) possesses the Sky Cloth (スカイクロス, Sukai Kurosu; Toucan Cloth), which has the power of "sky waves", the ability to absorb an enemy's technique blasts and attacks from the air.

=== Ghost Saints ===
Ghost Saints (幽霊聖闘士(ゴーストセイント), Gōsuto Seinto)
Voiced by: Kazumi Tanaka (Japanese) Eric Opella (English) (Crag), Hideyuki Tanaka (Japanese) Randy Sparks (English) (Dolphin), Masato Hirano (Japanese) Vic Mignogna (English) (Sea Serpent), Chiyoko Kawashima (Japanese) Kaytha Coker (English) (Geist)
The Caribbean Saints or Ghost Saints are a group of rogue bounty hunters hailing from the Island of Hell. They were known as Crag (クラッグ聖闘士, Kuraggu Seinto), Sea Serpent (シーサーペント聖闘士, Shīsāpento Seinto) and Dolphin (ドルフィン聖闘士, Dorufin Seinto), and were led by Shaina's protegee, Geist (ガイスト, Gaisuto). They were sent by the Pope to retrieve the Gold Cloth, and none of them succeeded nor survived. Although they are also known collectively by the alternate name of Ghost Saints, they are not to be confused with the quintet of the same name appearing in the first Saint Seiya theatrical release.

=== Black Saints ===
Death Queen's Black Three (デスクィーン暗黒スリー, Desu Kwīn Ankoku Surī)
Voiced by: Uncredited
A trio of Black Saints in Death Queen Island, subordinated to Jango, who tried to prevent Ikki from taking the Phoenix Cloth. Their design is inspired by Black Saints drawn by Masami Kurumada in the backgrounds of vol. 5 of his manga, as well as the event they take part in.
Black Phoenix Saint (暗黒鳳凰聖闘士(フェニックスセイント), Ankoku Fenikkusu Seinto)
Voiced by: Uncredited
The equivalent to Phoenix Ikki among the Black Saints. Unlike Ikki's four shadows, who were of a seemingly incorporeal nature, the Black Phoenix Saint was flesh and blood, an underling of Django, who, along him and the Black Three tried to kill Phoenix Ikki during his brief return to Death Queen Island, after the defeat of Perseus Algol, Kerberos Dante and Auriga Capella. Black Phoenix fell before Ikki, along his comrades, who suffered the same fate.

=== The previous Pope ===
The previous Pope (先代教皇, Sendai Kyōkō), the legitimate and benevolent Pope, who awarded Seiya the Pegasus Cloth. He was killed by Gemini Saga to usurp his authority, who hid his corpse in Star Hill, where it remained for over 10 years. Said to be the younger brother of the Pope before him, Aries Shion. Although the events he takes part in are taken directly from Kurumada's manga, this character can't be reconciled with an equivalent in it due to plentiful conflicting storyline aspects, as in Kurumada's work, the Pope killed by Saga was Aries Shion, and the Pope that Seiya knew was Saga himself. As with all the anime-only characters, he was retconned from the anime continuity with the adaptation of the Hades arc from Kurumada's manga.

=== Pope Arles' Minions ===
Pope Arles (アーレス教皇, Āresu Kyōkō)
Voiced by: Kazuyuki Sogabe
The identity given to Gemini Saga in the guise of the false Pope of Sanctuary in the anime adaptation. In Kurumada's manga, Saga as the false Pope goes unidentified by name. Arles was the moving force behind the corruption of Athena's Sanctuary. According to screenwriter of Saint Seiya anime Takao Koyama in an interview, Arles name comes from the Greek philosopher Aristotle (Greek: Aristotélēs, Japanese: アリストテレス Arisutoteresu).
Strategos Gigas (ギガース参謀長, Gigāsu Sanbōchō)
Voiced by: Masaharu Satō
Chief of Staff of Sanctuary, he oversaw the execution of the Pope's plans for retrieving the Sagittarius Gold Cloth.
Officer Phaeton (パエトン参謀, Paeton Sanbō)
Voiced by: Hirohiko Kakegawa
Assistant and lieutenant to Gigas. Appointed to oversee the assassination of the Bronze Saints.

=== Rankless Saints ===
Docrates (ドクラテス, Dokuratesu)
Voiced by: Masaharu Satō
A gigantic Saint without rank and constellation who is a henchman of the false Pope. Brother of Cassios. His main attack was called Heracles Onslaught Fist (ヘラクレス猛襲拳, Herakuresu Mōshū Ken). According to screenwriter of Saint Seiya anime, Takao Koyama, in an interview, his name comes from the word "doku" (毒; lit. 'poison'), and based on the name of the classical Greek philosopher Socrates (ソクラテス, Sokuratesu).
Flame Saint (炎熱聖闘士, Ennetsu Seinto)
Voiced by: Ken Yamaguchi
An unnamed Saint loyal to Gigas and sent by the Pope to retrieve the Gold Cloth. Killed by Phoenix Ikki. His main attack was called Fire Screw (ファイヤースクリュー, Faiyā Sukuryū).
Crystal Saint (水晶聖闘士(クリスタルセイント), Kurisutaru Seinto)
Voiced by: Michihiro Ikemizu
First introduced as Cygnus Hyōga's master in the anime (as opposed to the manga, in which Aquarius Camus was Hyōga's master), and later retconned. In the anime, Camus was the Crystal Saint's master. His Cloth resembles a snowflake when not being worn. A very honorable and righteous Saint, Crystal Saint was considered a threat by Pope Arles, who forced him into his control with the Maōken technique. After an emotional battle with Hyōga, Crystal Saint took his own life to stop Sanctuary from conquering East Siberia. After his death, he was gradually replaced in the anime adaptation by Camus as Hyōga's grandmaster and any events concerning him were disregarded in the continuity to stay true to Kurumada's manga.
Spartan (スパルタン, Suparutan)
Voiced by: Shigeru Chiba
A Saint without rank and constellation and one of Pope Arles's henchmen sent along Perseus Algol and Ophiuchus Shaina to assassinate the Bronze Saints. He failed on his mission. His main technique was called Psychokinesis (念力, Nenriki).

=== Anime-only Silver Saints ===
Cepheus Albiore (ケフェウス星座のアルビオレ, Kefeusu no Arubiore)
Voiced by: Keiichi Noda
The animated equivalent of Cepheus Daidalos from Kurumada's manga. Mentor to Andromeda Shun and Chameleon June. Although his background and personality and the events he takes part in are identical to those depicted in Kurumada's work, (except the fact he battled two Gold Saints, as opposed to the manga, in which he only fought against Pisces Aphrodite) Albiore's physique, Cloth and name differ from those of the original character Daidalos from the manga.
Tarantula Arachne (八分儀星座(タランチュラ)のアラクネ, Taranchura no Arakune)
Voiced by: Ken Yamaguchi
A Silver Saint without constellation sent by Sanctuary to retrieve the Gold Cloth. Killed by Pegasus Seiya in Jamir. His name is a reference to the Greek myth of Arachne, a maiden who was turned into a spider after she bested the Goddess Athena in a weaving contest. Note: Actually Tarantula is not a constellation, but a nebula.
Pavo Shiva (孔雀星座(パーヴォ)のシヴァ, Pāvo no Shiva)
Voiced by: Shigeru Nakahara
A Silver Saint, disciple of Virgo Shaka along with Lotus Aghora. He tried to kill Phoenix Ikki on Canon Island. Like Shaka, Shiva was an adept of Buddhism and relied on Shingon chants and prayer to paralyze his opponents, while performing his murderous Thousand Hands Kannon's Attack (千手観音拳, Senju Shinon Ken), a lightning-fast multi-hit technique. Although a buddhist himself, Shiva was not a practitioner of his religion's peaceful and merciful doctrine and precepts. Killed by Phoenix Ikki. His name is a reference to the Hindu god Shiva, and the peacock is a reference to Mahamayuri.
Lotus Aghora (蓮星座(ロータス)のアゴラ, Rōtasu no Agora)
Voiced by: Takaya Hashi
A Silver Saint, disciple of Virgo Shaka, sent to Canon Island to kill Phoenix Ikki. In the same way as his partner Shiva, Aghora relied on a fighting style based on shingon chants of the Lotus Sutra, which proved ineffective against the Phoenix Saint, who killed him. His name is a reference to the Aghori (Sanskrit Aghora), ascetic Shaiva sadhus in Hinduism. Note: unlike "Pavo" (or the Peacock), which is a constellation, the "Lotus" is merely a symbol which is frequently used in religions such as Hinduism and Buddhism.

=== Odin's Asgardians ===
The Asgardian characters appear in the anime adaptation only.

Odin (オーディーン, Ōdīn)
Voiced by: Kenji Utsumi
The king of Asgard and the Norse god incarnate. His essence is trapped within the seven Odin Sapphires (オーディーン・サファイア, Ōdīn Safaia) held within his God Warrior's God Robes. His Odin Robe (オーディーンローブ, Ōdīn Rōbu) can only be awakened with the energy from the Sapphires.
Polaris Hilda (ポラリスのヒルダ, Porarisu no Hiruda)
Voiced by: Mitsuko Horie
A beautiful and powerful young woman who is Odin's representative on Earth and priestess of Asgard. She is possessed by the Nibelung Ring (ニーベルンゲン・リング, Nīberungen Ringu) (controlled by Poseidon manipulated by Kanon who is Dragonsea General) after rejecting his influence, and sets her sights on world domination in the name of Odin. Her younger sister Freya contacts Saori and asks her and the Saints for help.
Saori quickly sets up a strategy: She will take Hilda's place temporarily as the one who prays to avoid the melting of the Polar Ice, while the Bronze Saints fight Hilda's Guardians to reach her. Hilda is finally freed after fighting Seiya, who awakened the Odin God Robe and the legendary sword Balmung with all Odin Sapphires, and returns to her gentle self. It's also revealed that Poseidon locked her spirit away in the Nibelung Ring as her body was controlled by him, torturing her psychologically since she could only watch her warriors die one by one.
Her name is a reference to Brunhild, Siegfried's lover, who gave her the magical ring Andvaranaut taken from the dragon Fafnir unaware that the ring was cursed.
Freya (フレア, Furea)
Voiced by: Maria Kawamura
Younger sister of Polaris Hilda. After being the first person (aside from Alberich) who notices the drastic change in her sister, she seeks out Saori and her Saints for help, freeing Hyōga from jail (he had been sent as a scout and then captured) and joining him, therefore she is branded as a traitor. She was deeply saddened for the battle, as she did not want it to come to be between Merak Hägen and Cygnus Hyōga; who was her first friend (and possible love interest) among the Bronze Saints, and Hägen was her bodyguard and best friend since childhood.
Her name is a reference to goddess Freya.

==== Odin's God Warriors ====
Odin has a cadre of servants known as God Warriors (神闘士(ゴッドウォーリアー), Goddo Wōriā). They wear armors known as God Robes (神闘衣(ゴッドローブ), Goddo Rōbu) themed after mythological creatures from Norse mythology and named after the stars of Ursa Major.

Dubhe Alpha Siegfried (α星ドゥベのジークフリート, Arufa-sei Dube no Jīkufurīto)
Voiced by: Akira Kamiya
He is said to be the strongest warrior among the God Warriors and the second in command after Hilda. He is very loyal to Hilda and seems to harbor deeper feelings for her. In the beginning, he does not believe the Saints when they tell him that Hilda is being controlled by the Niebelungen Ring. However, after Poseidon's Sea General Siren Sorento arrived and told the truth, he switched sides and sacrificed himself to kill Siren Sorento (although Sorento was thought to have died, he actually survived and returns to Poseidon). His armor resembles the dragon Fafner. He is commented to be "invulnerable", in the same way as the Norse legendary hero Siegfried, one of the reasons why he is considered the strongest God Warrior. He shared a common weakness with Shiryū, namely the exposure of the location of his heart, during an attack. It is a common weakness which all Saints (who bear a dragon in their cloth) share.
Merak Beta Hägen (β星メラクのハーゲン, Bēta-sei Meraku no Hāgen)
Voiced by: Bin Shimada
Since childhood, he lived in the Valhalla Palace training in the cold mountain peaks and volcanic caves in Asgard with the purpose of protecting Hilda and Freya. Jealous of Hyōga's relationship with Freya, Hägen fought against him and tries to kill Freya but was defeated by the freezing blast of the Aurora Execution.
His God Robe resembles Sleipnir, the eight-legged horse owned by Odin, and his name is a reference to Hagen, the slayer of Siegfried, killing the hero during a hunt, wounding him on the only part of his body which was not invulnerable.
Phecda Gamma Thor (γ星フェクダのトール, Ganma-sei Fekuda no Tōru)
Voiced by: Yūsaku Yara
Thor was a poor Asgard villager who stole riches from the wealthy and gave it to the poor, similar to Robin Hood. At some point, though, he was severely injured by the Valhalla Palace guardians when he tried to hunt near the Palace. Almost dying, he is forgiven and healed by Odin's priestess Polaris Hilda, despite his harsh words about her reign. Ever since he felt her pure and warm Cosmo, and was moved by Hilda's frustration about not being able to help everyone in Asgard despite being Odin's priestess, Thor swore to protect her as her guardian.
Despite noticing that Hilda's Cosmo had changed, he fought against Athena's Saints hoping that she would return to being the kind person she once was. He even threw one of his hand axes against Saori, and when she returned it to him with her Cosmo, he praised her strength. Finally, he asked Seiya to rescue Hilda after being defeated.
His armor resembles Jörmungandr, the sea serpent, who faced the Norse god Thor at the Battle of Ragnarök.
Megrez Delta Alberich (δ星メグレスのアルベリッヒ, Deruta-sei Meguresu no Aruberihhi)
Voiced by: Shigeru Nakahara
Descendant of a renowned family of warriors and scholars in Asgard, Alberich was famous for his intelligence and cunning, as well as for his cold heart; his own fellow warriors didn't trust him, and Hilda herself lectured him often. He was the only witness of Hilda's possession by Poseidon's Nibelung ring; taking advantage of this war, he planned to conquer the world. He defeated many of Athena's Saints (including Eagle Marin), encasing several of them in life-sucking giant amethysts; however, Shiryū, with the help of his master Dohko finally defeated him. He was one of the most shrewd, sly warriors as he could have nature fight for him and used his intelligence to avoid fighting.
His God Robe resembles gemstones of the treasure of the Nibelungen that Alberich (the chief of the Nibelungen) guards.
Alioth Epsilon Fenrir (ε星アリオトのフェンリル, Ippushiron-sei Arioto no Fenriru)
Voiced by: Toshihiko Seki, Naoko Watanabe (as child)
Fenrir was a member of one of the most powerful and richest families in Asgard. One day, when he and his family went hunting, they were attacked by a bear. Helped by wolves and abandoned by humans, he started to live with wolves adopting their life style and deeply hating humans. Later, he was chosen by Hilda as the Epsilon God Warrior. He died fighting against Shiryū when an avalanche fell over him and his wolves.
His God Robe resembles that of his namesake Fenrir, the wolf child of Loki prophesied to bring about Ragnarök.
Mizar Zeta Syd (ζ星ミザールのシド, Zēta-sei Mizāru no Shido)
Voiced by: Yū Mizushima
He was the first God Warrior to be introduced in the Asgard arc. He was sent to Sanctuary to 'declare' war against Athena. He defeated Taurus Aldebaran with one blow (it was later revealed that a hidden force helped him). Then he went to Japan to kill Athena, he was stopped by Seiya and Shun, and he returned to his country waiting for the Saints to come and fight there. He was defeated by Shun's Nebula Storm in the Valhalla palace. Before his death, it was revealed he always knew about his twin brother, Alcor Zeta Bud, and both he and his parents always regretted having abandoned him, but were unable to do anything in his favor. His God Robe is that of a saber-toothed cat.
Alcor Zeta Bud (ζ星アルコルのバド, Zēta-sei Arukoru no Bado)
Voiced by: Yū Mizushima
Syd and Bud are twins who were born into a very wealthy family in Asgard. Due to local superstitions that twins bring bad luck to the family, Bud's parents were forced to abandon the younger twin, Bud. A poor man raised him as his own child, until one day, during hunting, Bud encountered his twin brother Syd and the parents who abandoned him. Hilda made of him a shadow God Warrior, saying he would replace Syd as the real God Warrior only when Syd died. He held much hatred against his brother Syd for all of this; yet after much convincing from Ikki (Phoenix Genma Ken included), he realized that all his actions (helping Syd to defeat Aldebaran, and later Shun when Syd was losing the battle) was due to the fact that he loved his brother very much, yet could not admit it. He then carried Syd's body into the blizzard, where Bud presumably died, wishing that he and Syd could again be brothers should they reincarnate. His God Robe, like his brother, is also a saber-toothed cat.
Benetnasch Eta Mime (η星ベネトナーシュのミーメ, Ēta-sei Benetonāshu no Mīme)
Voiced by: Yūji Mitsuya, Tomiko Suzuki (as child)
Mime grew up with his father Folker, a powerful warrior who trained him against his will, since Mime himself wanted to be a musician. One day, Mime discovered that Folker had cruelly killed his true parents; guided by his fury and by Folker's boasting, he killed Folker. After defeating Shun, who was deprived of the use of his chains, he fought against Ikki.
At the end of this battle, Mime discovered (by being attacked with the Phoenix Hōō Genma Ken) that Folker actually was a good man who killed Mime's parents unintentionally. He fought Mime's father and spared him when he found out that he was married, yet he still tried to attack and it was then Folker fatally hit him in self-defense, Mime's mother attempted to stop them yet it was too late and both died. Then, Folker heard baby Mime cry in his crib, and out of guilt he took Mime as his child. Ultimately, Folker actually provoked Mime because he wanted to die by his adopted son's hand, to make up for the fatal mistake that cost Mime his true family.
Mime's last words to Ikki were that he wished that in a new life they could both be reborn and be friends.
Mime's God Robe resembles the harp belonging to Bragi, the god of poetry in Norse mythology accused by the god Loki of being the most afraid to fight among the gods, and his name is a reference to the Nibelung dwarf Mime, brother of Alberich. Mime is a character in the operatic cycle Der Ring des Nibelungen by Richard Wagner, he is the Nibelung who forged the cursed Nibelung Ring. The character is based on Regin, foster father of Sigurd (Siegfried) and brother of Fafnir.

=== Other support characters ===
Dr. Asamori (麻森博士, Asamori Hakase)
Voiced by: Yasuo Muramatsu
Creator of the Steel Saints' mechanical Cloths, under commission by Mitsumasa Kido.
Ōko (王虎; Pinyin: Wang-Hǔ)
Voiced by: Kazuhiko Inoue, Seiko Nakano (as child)
Ōko was Dragon Shiryū's training partner and bitter rival. Though not a saint, he somehow drew his attacks from the tiger, which in most Asian myths and legends is the counterpart of the dragon.
Jaki (ジャキ)
Voiced by: Masaharu Satō
A former Saint apprentice who failed to achieve his goal, he turned to a life of violence with the enormous strength he managed to attain. He dies after falling off a cliff trying to kill Eagle Marin.
Hayate (ハヤテ号, Hayate-gō)
A smart police dog who helped Seiya in the search of the Gold Cloth.
Akira, Makoto, Tatsuya, and Mimiko (アキラ、マコト、タツヤとミミ子, Akira, Makoto, Tatsuya to Mimiko)
Voiced by: Yumi Tōma (Akira), Noriko Uemura (Makoto), Michiyo Yanagisawa (Tatsuya), Yumiko Shibata (Mimiko)
Young children, fellow orphans and admirers of Pegasus Seiya in the Star Children Academy, where they grew up together. Although their appearance is based in unidentified orphans appearing in Kurumada's manga, their names are revealed only in the anime adaptation. They also appear in some of the Saint Seiya theatrical releases.
Leda and Spica (レダとスピカ, Reda to Supika)
Voiced by: Kazumi Tanaka, Masami Kikuchi
Saint apprentices under Cepheus Albiore and former training partners of Andromeda Shun. Their names refer to Spica and Leda. References of this can be found in the Cloth and chains both wear.
Elene and Elder (エレーネと長老, Erēne to Chōrō)
Voiced by: Masako Miura, Jōji Yanami
A young girl and an elderly man from Canon Island, whose lives were endangered by the rage of Lotus Agora and Pavo Shiva. Saved by Phoenix Ikki.
Europa (エウローペー, Eurṓpē)
Voiced by: Ryō Hirohashi
The only anime-original character added in the Hades arc adaptation to anime. A girl from Rodorio village, seemingly romantically interested in Taurus Aldebaran.
