= List of Saint Seiya films =

- Saint Seiya

聖闘士星矢 (Seinto Seiya)
- Genre: Action, fantasy, mythological
- Created by: Masami Kurumada
- Anime film

Evil Goddess Eris
- Directed by: Kōzō Morishita
- Written by: Yoshiyuki Suga
- Music by: Seiji Yokoyama
- Studio: Toei Animation
- Released: July 18, 1987
- Runtime: 45 minutes
- Anime film

The Heated Battle of the Gods
- Directed by: Shigeyasu Yamauchi
- Written by: Takao Koyama
- Music by: Seiji Yokoyama
- Studio: Toei Animation
- Released: March 12, 1988
- Runtime: 45 minutes
- Anime film

Legend of Crimson Youth
- Directed by: Shigeyasu Yamauchi
- Written by: Yoshiyuki Suga
- Music by: Seiji Yokoyama
- Studio: Toei Animation
- Released: July 23, 1988
- Runtime: 75 minutes
- Anime film

Warriors of the Final Holy Battle
- Directed by: Masayuki Akehi
- Written by: Yoshiyuki Suga
- Music by: Seiji Yokoyama
- Studio: Toei Animation
- Released: March 18, 1989
- Runtime: 45 minutes
- Anime film

Heaven Chapter – Overture
- Directed by: Shigeyasu Yamauchi
- Written by: Michiko Yokote
- Music by: Seiji Yokoyama
- Studio: Toei Animation
- Released: February 14, 2004
- Runtime: 85 minutes
- Anime film

Legend of Sanctuary
- Directed by: Keiichi Sato
- Written by: Tomohiro Suzuki
- Music by: Yoshihiro Ike
- Studio: Toei Animation
- Released: June 21, 2014
- Runtime: 95 minutes
- Live-action film
- Knights of the Zodiac
- Related anime
- Saint Seiya (The Hades Chapter); Saint Seiya: The Lost Canvas; Saint Seiya Omega; Saint Seiya: Soul of Gold; Saint Seiya: Saintia Shō; Knights of the Zodiac: Saint Seiya

Due to the series' high popularity in Japan and in Spain, France, Italy, Latin America and China, six films based on Saint Seiya were released in theatres between 1987 and 2014. The plots of these films are not canon with the chronology and events of the manga or anime plots, except for Heaven Chapter – Overture.

These films were never released in the U.S until it was announced by Discotek Media in 2012 that they had acquired the rights to the first four movies in a two disc set. The DVDs contain the original Japanese audio track with English subtitles.

== Evil Goddess Eris (1987) ==
Saint Seiya (聖闘士星矢, Seinto Seiya), retitled Saint Seiya: Evil Goddess Eris (聖闘士星矢 邪神エリス, Seinto Seiya: Jashin Erisu) on its home video release, is the first anime film of the series. The movie was directed by Kōzō Morishita and produced by Toei Animation. The movie premiered on July 18, 1987, at the Toei Manga Matsuri film festival.

When Seiya, Hyōga and Shun visit Saori Kido (Athena) at the Miho's orphanage, they meet an employee called Eri Aizawa. An orphan herself, Eri takes a liking to Hyōga and one night they sit outside watching the stars. They see a shooting star and Hyōga asks Eri to make a wish. After Hyōga leaves, however, Eri becomes powerfully attracted to the shooting star and wanders alone into the woods, where she finds a golden apple. She is then possessed by Eris, The Greek Goddess of Discord, and kidnaps Athena, planning to use the golden apple to suck her energy out, fully reincarnate and take over the world. Eris leaves a message for the Bronze Saints, who set out for the goddess's temple which appears on the mountains. There, the heroes fight the five Ghost Saints: Sagitta Maya, Lyra Orpheus, Southern Cross Khristós, Scutum Jan and Orion Jäger.

== The Heated Battle of the Gods (1988) ==
Saint Seiya: The Heated Battle of the Gods (聖闘士星矢 神々の熱き戦い, Seinto Seiya: Kamigami no Atsuki Tatakai) is the second anime film of the franchise. The movie was directed by Shigeyasu Yamauchi and produced by Toei Animation. It premiered on March 12, 1988 in the Toei Manga Matsuri film festival.

In Siberia, Hyōga saves a man that is being attacked. Injured, the man manages only to say something about Asgard. Some days later, Saori, Seiya, Shiryū and Shun are wondering about Hyōga and decide to go to Asgard to investigate. At Valhalla, the Lord of Asgard, Durbal, says he has not heard of any Hyōga and neither has his right hand, Loki. However, at all times Seiya and the others can feel an evil cosmo emanating from Loki and the other Odin Saints called God Warriors. Shiryū, in particular, notices a familiar cosmo coming from Midgard, a mysterious, masked God Warrior. Durbal makes it clear that he is trying to take control of both Asgard and the Sanctuary, imprisoning Athena in a strange dimension within the giant statue of Odin. Midgard reveals himself as Hyōga and tries to kill Shiryū to prove himself to Durbal. Thus, it is the task of the Bronze Saints to defeat Durbal and his God Warriors (Loki, Ullr and Hrung), to save Athena and Hyōga.

Due to this film's popularity, Toei Animation created the Asgard saga for the anime series, which did not originally appear in the manga and is set between the Sanctuary and Poseidon arcs of the story.

== Legend of Crimson Youth (1988) ==
Saint Seiya: The Legend of Crimson Youth (聖闘士星矢 真紅の少年伝説, Seinto Seiya: Shinku no Shōnen Densetsu) is the third anime film of the series. The movie was also directed by Shigeyasu Yamauchi and produced by Toei Animation. Unlike its predecessors, which premiered on the Toei Manga Matsuri film festivals, this installment was instead shown on July 23, 1988 at the Weekly Jump 20th Anniversary Festival.

Athena receives the visit of Phoebus Abel, her older brother and God of the Corona. He informs her that he has come to destroy humanity as punishment for their corruption, just as it was done in ancient times. He dismisses Seiya and the Bronze Saints, as she will now be guarded by Abel's three Corona Saints: Carina Atlas (竜骨座のアトラス, Karīna no Atorasu), Lynx Yaw (山猫座のジャオウ, Rinkusu no Jaō) and Coma Berenices Bellenike (Note: Portmanteau of French word Belle (lit. "beauty") and Greek name Berenike) (髪毛座のベレニケ, Koma no Berenike); and the five resurrected Gold Saints who died in the Sanctuary battle: Gemini Saga, Cancer Deathmask, Capricorn Shura, Aquarius Camus and Pisces Aphrodite. When Athena rebels against Abel's plan, he attacks her, sending her soul to Elysion, the final resting place from which there is no return. The Bronze Saints immediately rush to save her and defeat Abel.

Unlike the other Saint Seiya movies made in the 1980s, this one was a full featured film, having a running time of 75 minutes. The events occur sometime after the Poseidon saga and before the Hades saga.

== Warriors of the Final Holy Battle (1989) ==
Saint Seiya: Warriors of the Final Holy Battle (聖闘士星矢 最終聖戦の戦士たち, Seinto Seiya: Saishū Seisen no Senshitachi) is the fourth anime film of the franchise. The movie was directed by Masayuki Akihi and produced by Toei Animation. It premiered on March 18, 1989 in the Toei Manga Matsuri film festival.

Lucifer, a fallen angel who was a child of God but was condemned to hell for his ambitions, has risen to the present day and began to spread disasters around the world. Athena sacrifices herself to save the earth and heads alone to the Fushima Hall, where Lucifer is waiting. Upon learning of this, Seiya and the other Bronze Saints follow Saori to the Fushima Hall, but in front of them are four Holy Hell Angels (Beelzebub, Astaroth, Eligor and Moa) powerful enemies who have also defeated the Gold Saints. A fierce final battle begins for the future of the earth and the fate of the entire universe.

== Heaven Chapter – Overture (2004) ==
DVD cover of Heaven Chapter – Overture

Saint Seiya: Heaven Chapter – Overture (聖闘士星矢 天界編 序奏 〜overture〜, Seinto Seiya: Tenkai-hen Josō ~Overture~) is the fifth anime film of the franchise. The movie was directed by Shigeyasu Yamauchi and produced by Toei Animation. It premiered on February 14, 2004 in Japan. The film is the final continuation to the Saint Seiya: The Hades Chapter anime series.

Injured after surviving from the Holy War with Hades in the Elysium, Seiya, under Saori Kido's care, is in a vegetative state due to Hades's sword curse. Artemis, The Goddess of the Moon and Athena's older sister, comes to Earth and strikes a bargain with her: In return for restoring Seiya's mind and body, she will take control over Sanctuary. Now Seiya and his fellow Bronze Saints must fight Zeus and his Angels to restore their homeland. Hoping that it may bring peace on Earth once again, Saori goes to the Sanctuary and starts spilling her blood to save the humanity. Upon invading the Sanctuary, the Bronze Saints finally learn that Athena was banished by Artemis and decide to fight the moon goddess in order to rescue their true goddess and free the Sanctuary and the Earth from Artemis's ominous control once and for all.

The movie focuses mostly on Seiya and Athena, as the other Bronze Saints are not seen as much; they only appear during their respective fights with the other Angels, and briefly towards the end. However, Eagle Marin also appears, as Ophiuchus Shaina, Unicorn Jabu, and Hydra Ichi do, though the latter three are just cameos.

The movie also has a very ambiguous ending, with many plot points and danglers unresolved with rushed out animation. Also many omissions from the original script were made such as: Seiya's cloth early in the film; Seiya's older sister Seika's appearance and crucial important role diminished; two more Angel opponents for other Saints to fight; the Libra Cloth box was supposed to be in the film at one time.

== Legend of Sanctuary (2014) ==
Saint Seiya: Legend of Sanctuary (聖闘士星矢 レジェンド・オブ・サンクチュアリ, Seinto Seiya Rejendo Obu Sankuchuari), is the sixth anime film of the franchise. The movie was directed by Keiichi Sato and produced by Toei Animation. It premiered on June 21, 2014 in Japan.

Saori Kido, a beautiful teenager with strange powers who was raised by Mitsumasa Kido, pretending to be her grandfather. As she heads to the airport with her butler Tokumaru Tatsumi, she learns from him that she is Athena's reincarnation and what fate awaits her. It is then that she is attacked by Saints. But Pegasus Seiya, accompanied by Dragon Shiryu, Cygnus Hyoga and Andromeda Shun intervene to save her. A few hours later, Leo Aiolia, Aioros' younger brother, confronts Seiya and his companions. After recovering Aiolos' gold armor, he invites them to meet the Pope with Saori. She and her four Bronze Saints are joined by Shun' older brother Phoenix Ikki. They invade the sanctuary. But time is running out: before leaving, Saori was hit in the chest by a Saint sent by the Pope. A mysterious evil makes her suffer and slowly ends her life span. Seiya, Shiryu, Hyoga, Shun and Ikki must then go through the houses of the twelve Gold Saints to access the Pope's room so that Saori's life is saved and that she officially becomes Athena.

== Knights of the Zodiac: The Beginning (2023) ==
In 2016, Toei Animation announced that a live-action Saint Seiya film was in development. A few months after the announcement it was revealed that Tomasz Bagiński would be directing. The official title of the film is Saint Seiya: Knights of the Zodiac. In 2021, The Hollywood Reporter revealed that the film will star Mackenyu as Seiya/Pegasus, Madison Iseman as Sienna Kiddo/Athena, Sean Bean as Alman Kiddo, and Diego Tinoco as Nero/Phoenix, a man hired to kill the vulnerable goddess. Famke Janssen, Nick Stahl and Mark Dacascos are also cast in the film. The film was released on April 28, 2023.
