= Adrian Knight =

Canadian actor

- Occupation(s): Actor, Voice Actor, Location Manager

Adrian Knight is a Canadian actor who was the voice for the character Tao in the English-language version of the animated series The Mysterious Cities of Gold.

He also voiced Telemachus in the series Ulysses 31, Pot the troll in the series The World of David the Gnome and movie counterpart The Gnomes' Great Adventure, as well as Cosmo and various voices in the series Adventures of the Little Koala, Sebastian in the English dub of Belle and Sebastian and various voices in the English version of the 1986 anime The Wonderful Wizard of Oz, the Cinelume dub of Astro Boy and the hit videogame Splinter Cell.

He also worked as a location manager on TV shows and movies such as Tales from the Neverending Story, The Score, Lassie, The Amazing Race and Taking Lives.
