= Blake Shepard =

American voice actor

- Occupation: Voice actor
- Years active: 2003–present

Blake Shepard is an American voice actor who works on anime series. He has provided voices for a number of English-language versions of Japanese anime series and films; notable credits include Ikki from Amnesia, Yuzuru Otonashi from Angel Beats!, Soma Yukihira from Food Wars!: Shokugeki no Soma, Arata Wataya from Chihayafuru, Tanaka from Tanaka-kun is Always Listless, Birthday from Hamatora, Agito Wanijima from Air Gear, Godo Kusanagi from Campione!, Taro Sado from MM!, Kei Takishima from S · A: Special A, Kyosuke Natsume from the Little Busters! series, Futoshi from Darling in the Franxx, Akiyuki Takehara from Xam'd: Lost Memories, Dragon Shiryū from Saint Seiya, and Hiro Hiyorimi from Princess Resurrection. Outside of voice acting, Shepard is the lead singer and guitarist in a band called Electric Attitude.

== Career ==
In 2017, Shepard voiced Arata Wataya, who is Chihaya's childhood friend that inspired her to play competitive karuta in Sentai Filmworks' English dub of the Chihayafuru anime series. The first season of the series was released on home video in September 2017.

== Dubbing roles ==
=== Anime ===
List of dubbing performances in anime
Year	Title	Role	Notes	Source
2005	Gilgamesh	Tatsuya Madoka, Terumichi Madoka		Press
2007	Air Gear	Akito/Agito Wanijima		
2011	Angel Beats!	Yuzuru Otonashi		
2012	Princess Resurrection	Hiro Hiyorimi		
2012	Campione!	Godou Kusanagi		
2012	Trails in the Sky OVA	Joshua		
2013	La Storia Della Arcana Famiglia	Liberta		
2013	Special A	Kei Takishima		
2013	Little Busters!	Kyosuke Natsume	also season 2, EX	
2013	Another	Ikuo Takabayashi		
2014	From the New World	Mamoru Ito		
2014	Amnesia	Ikki		
2014	Diabolik Lovers	Laito Sakamaki	also season 2	
2014–present	Haikyuu!!	Hisashi Kinoshita		
2015	Brynhildr in the Darkness	Ryota Murakami		
2015	Dog and Scissors	Kazuhito Harumi		
2016	Nanbaka	Liang		
2016	Tanaka-kun is Always Listless	Tanaka		
2016	ReLife	Kazuomi Ōga		
2017	Chihayafuru	Arata Wataya		
2017	Chivalry of a Failed Knight	Shizuya Kirihara		
2017–2023	Food Wars!	Soma Yukihira		
2018	Darling in the Franxx	Futoshi		
2019	Knights of the Zodiac: Saint Seiya	Dragon Shiryū		
2019	Saint Seiya	Dragon Shiryū	Netflix dub	
2020	The Pet Girl of Sakurasou	Ryūnosuke Akasaka		
2022	My Isekai Life	Brow Slime		
2022	Blue Lock	Kira		
2023	Farming Life in Another World	Hiraku Machio		
2023	Love Flops	Yoshio		
2024	Helck	Chef Ajikaba		
2025	Loner Life in Another World	Nerd A		
2025	Rock Is a Lady's Modesty	Itsuki		
