= Knights of the Zodiac: Saint Seiya =

2019 Japanese-American animated webseries

- Also known as: Knights of the Zodiac: Saint Seiya – Battle for Sanctuary (season 2)
- Created by: Masami Kurumada
- Based on: Saint Seiya by Masami Kurumada
- Screenplay by: see list: Benjamin Townsend; Patrick Rieger; Thomas Pugsley; Shannon Eric Denton; Thomas F. Zahler; Joelle Sellner; Travis Donnelly; Saundra Hall; Shaene Siders; Henry Gilroy; Marty Isenberg; Anne Mortensen-Agnew; Chris Wyatt; Kevin Burke; Julien Magnat; Danielle Wolff; Katie Kaniewski; Callie C. Miller; Becky Wangberg; Sarah Eisenberg; Jennifer Muro; Jeremiah Smith; Meredith Kecskemety; Jenny DeArmitt; Matt S. Wayne; Denise Downer; Ta'riq Fisher
- Story by: Eugene Son
- Directed by: Yoshiharu Ashino
- Voices of: Emily Neves; Bryson Baugus; Patrick Poole; Blake Shepard; Luci Christian; Adam Gibbs
- Opening theme: "Pegasus Seiya" by The Struts
- Ending theme: "Somebody New" by The Struts
- Composer: Yoshihiro Ike
- Countries of origin: Japan; United States
- Original language: English
- No. of seasons: 2
- No. of episodes: 36 (list of episodes)

Production
- Executive producers: Kozo Morishita; Hiromi Kitazaki (season 1); Takashi Washio (season 1); Atsushi Suzuki (season 2)
- Producers: Joseph Chou; Yoshi Ikezawa
- Editor: Mutsumi Takemiya
- Running time: 23 minutes
- Production companies: Toei Animation; Toei Animation USA; Sentai Studios

Original release
- Network: Netflix
- Release: July 19, 2019 – January 23, 2020
- Network: Crunchyroll
- Release: July 31, 2022 – June 10, 2024

Knights of the Zodiac: Saint Seiya (聖闘士星矢(セイントセイヤ): ナイツ・オブ・ザ・ゾディアック, Seinto Seiya: Naitsu obu za Zodiakku) is a Japanese-American original net animation (ONA) series based on the manga series Saint Seiya by Masami Kurumada.

== Plot ==
Seiya, a Japanese-American young teen, is recruited by Alman Kiddo to become a fabled Bronze Knight (青銅聖闘士, Buronzu Seinto). The series follows the Bronze Knights as they fight prolific warriors in the quest of becoming Goddess Athena Warriors, while Seiya at the same time is looking for his missing older sister Patricia.

== Production ==
The series was first revealed to be in the works in December 2016 at CCXP in Brazil. On August 2, 2017, Cinematoday.jp published an article which revealed that the project was a collaboration with Netflix to make a new adaptation of the manga and anime classic series. Yoshiharu Ashino was announced as the director, and Eugene Son among others as the writers. The first six episodes were released on Netflix on July 19, 2019, and loosely adapts the "Galaxian Wars" and the "Black Knights" arcs from the manga. Another six episodes that loosely adapt the "Silver Knights" arc were released on January 23, 2020.

A second season, titled Knights of the Zodiac: Saint Seiya – Battle for Sanctuary (聖闘士星矢(セイントセイヤ): ナイツ・オブ・ザ・ゾディアック 〜バトル・サンクチュアリ〜, Seinto Seiya: Naitsu obu za Zodiakku – Batoru Sankuchuari), was announced on June 29, 2022. It premiered on July 31, 2022. Crunchyroll licensed the sequel outside of Asia. Part 2 of the second season was announced on December 3, 2022, and premiered on April 1, 2024.

== Voice cast ==
Character (Japanese name)	Cast	
Character (Japanese name)	English	Japanese
Sienna Kiddo / Athena Saori Kido / Athena	Emily Neves	Fumiko Orikasa
Pegasus Seiya	Bryson Baugus (Original) Crocket Groves (Child)	Masakazu Morita (Original) Yukiko Morishito (Child)
Cygnus Magnus Cygnus Hyōga	Patrick Poole	Hiroaki Miura
Dragon Long Dragon Shiryū	Blake Shepard	Takahiro Sakurai
Andromeda Shaun Andromeda Shun	Luci Christian	Satomi Satō
Phoenix Nero Phoenix Ikki	Adam Gibbs	Katsuyuki Konishi
Chameleon Genet Chameleon June	Chaney Moore	Aya Hisakawa
Unicorn Jab Unicorn Jabu	Leraldo Anzaldua	Hideo Ishikawa
Bear Geki	Adam Noble	Kohei Fukuhara
Wolf Nach Wolf Nachi	Cameron Bautsch	Takeshi Kusao
Hydra Ichi	Justin Doran	Masaya Onosaka
Lionet Ban	John Swasey	Naoki Imamura
Eagle Marin	Maggie Flecknoe	Fumiko Inoue
Ophiuchus Shaina	Katelyn Barr	Yuka Komatsu
Lizard Misty	Corey Hartzog	Hisafumi Oda
Whale Morris Whale Moses	Courtland Johnson	Tetsu Inada
Hound Asterion	Nathan Wilson	Ryohei Arai
Crow Jamian	Justin Doran	Junji Kitajima
Kerberos Dante	Joe Daniels	Eiji Hanawa
Perseus Argol Perseus Algol	Austin Tindle	Ryosuke Kanemoto
Sagitta Tremy Sagitta Ptolemy	Michael Wronski	Ryōhei Arai
Cepheus Daedalus	Mark Mendelsohn	Keiichi Noda
Aries Mu	John Gremillion	Takumi Yamazaki
Taurus Aldebaran	Josh Morrison	Tesshō Genda
Cancer Deathmask	Jay Hickman	Ryōichi Tanaka
Leo Aiolia	Greg Cote	Hideyuki Tanaka
Sagittarius Aiolos	Greg Cote	Yusaku Yara
Virgo Shaka	Scott Gibbs	Yūji Mitsuya
Libra Dohko	John Swasey	Hiroshi Iwasaki
Scorpio Milo	Alejandro Saab	Toshihiko Seki
Capricorn Shura	Jovan Jackson	Takeshi Kusao
Aquarius Camus	Kregg Dailey	Nobutoshi Canna
Pisces Aphrodite	Ry McKeand	Keiichi Nanba
The Grandmaster The Pope	David Matranga	Ryotaro Okiayu
Gemini Saga	David Matranga	Ryotaro Okiayu
Cleo	Christine Auten	Mie Sonozaki
Cassios	Andrew Love	Toshitsugu Takashina
Guilty	David Harbold	Masafumi Kimura
Esmeralda	Juliet Simmons	Shino Shimoji
Kiki	Kira Vincent-Davis	Umeka Shoji
Shunrei Chunli	Hilary Haag	Haruka Terui
Patricia Seika	Lillian Jones	Yukiko Motoyoshi
Mylock Tatsumi	Ty Mahany	Hisao Egawa
Alman Kiddo Mitsumasa Kido	Axel Lutter	Katsuhisa Hōki
Vander Guraad Vander Graad	James Belcher	Hideaki Tezuka
Narrator	Marty Fleck	Hideyuki Tanaka

== Characters' nationality and ethnicity ==
Character	Birthplace (Ethnicity)	
Character	2019 anime	1986 manga
Pegasus Seiya	United States (Japanese-American)	Japan
Dragon Long	United States (Chinese-American)	Japan (Chinese-Japanese)
Cygnus Magnus	Russia	Soviet Union (Japanese-Russian)
Andromeda Shaun	Germany	Japan
Phoenix Nero	Germany	Japan
Chameleon Genet	South Africa (Afrikaner)	Ethiopia (Afrikaner)
Unicorn Jab	United States (Korean-American)	Japan
Bear Geki	Canada (Inuit)	Japan
Wolf Nach	Morocco	Japan
Lionet Ban	South Korea	Japan
Hydra Ichi	Japan	Japan
Lizard Misty	France	France
Whale Moses	New Zealand (Maōri)	New Zealand (Maōri)
Hound Asterion	Denmark	Denmark
Crow Jamian	United Kingdom	United Kingdom
Kerberos Dante	Italy	Italy
Perseus Argol	Saudi Arabia	Saudi Arabia
Sagitta Ptomely	Libya	Libya
Ophiucus Shaina	Mexico	Italy
Eagle Marin	(N/A) Unknown	Japan
Cepheus Daedalus	Argentina	Argentina
Aries Mu	China (Lemurian)	China (Lemurian)
Taurus Aldebaran	Brazil	Brazil
Gemini Saga	Greece	Greece
Cancer Deathmask	Italy	Italy
Leo Aiolia	Greece	Greece
Virgo Shaka	India (Anglo-Indian)	India (Anglo-Indian)
Libra Dohko	(Qing dynasty) Qing Dynasty (Han Chinese)	(Qing dynasty) Qing Dynasty (Han Chinese)
Scorpio Milo	Greece	Greece
Sagittarius Aiolos	Greece	Greece
Capricorn Shura	Spain	Spain
Aquarius Camus	France	France
Pisces Aphrodite	Sweden	Sweden

== Series overview ==
Season	Title	Episodes		Originally released		
Season	Title	Episodes		First released	Last released	Network
1	—	12	6	July 19, 2019		Netflix
1	—	12	6	January 23, 2020		Netflix
2	Battle for Sanctuary	24	12	July 31, 2022	October 9, 2022	Crunchyroll
2	Battle for Sanctuary	24	12	April 1, 2024	June 10, 2024	Crunchyroll

== Episode list ==
=== Season 1 (2019-2020) ===
==== Part 1 (2019) ====
No. overall	No. in season	Title	Directed by	Written by	Original release date
1	1	"Seiya"	Yasuhiro Tanabe	Shannon Eric Denton	July 19, 2019
At the orphanage, Patricia's hands are glowing. Shortly after, a group of soldiers arrives to abduct her. Before they can take her away, the Golden Knight Leo Aiolia appears, defeats the soldiers and abducts Patricia, having sensed Cosmo in her. Despite her younger brother Seiya's attempts to save her, she is abducted, leaving him distraught. A few years later, during a scuffle, the teenaged Seiya discovers that he too possesses Cosmo. After returning to the orphanage to get some rest, Seiya is abducted and finds himself in a room where he is greeted by the enigmatic Alman Kido, who has been watching Seiya, witnessed his Cosmo awakening. Kido now requests Seiya to become the Pegasus Bronze Knight, convinced that this is his destiny. Before the conversation can go any further, the same soldiers who attempted to abduct Patricia, breach the Kido mansion. Vander Guraad seeks to kill Alman's granddaughter Sienna Kido, believed to be the reincarnation of Athena, who has been reborn with a dark prophecy that she will lead humanity to ruin. Seiya and Sienna are saved by Alman's butler Mylock, who brings them on a helicopter. However, Guraad's soldiers open fire and the helicopter starts to plummet. Sienna and Mylock get on a motorcycle while Seiya is forced to jump out. He then summons power from his Cosmo to bring down a pursuing helicopter, allowing Sienna and Mylock to escape through a hidden waterfall.
2	2	"Burn Your Cosmo"	Yasuhiro Tanabe	Thomas F. Zahler	July 19, 2019
Seiya arrives at Chamos Island by Alman's request but is confronted by a group of Sanctuary guards. The Silver Knight Eagle Marin prevents the guards from executing Seiya once she hears his name, taking him as her own student. After 6 years of training, the now adult Seiya defeats Cassios and finally obtains the Pegasus Bronze Armor. Despite the Grand Master's warning that Knights are forbidden to fight for anything else but for the justice and for Athena, Marin instructs Seiya to participate in the Galaxian Wars Tournament. Despite not understanding why, Seiya obliges and locates a secret underground base in the desert, where he reunites with Sienna and Mylock, and also meets several other Bronze Knights who have obtained their own Bronze Armors. Sienna announces that with the gathering of Knights, the Galaxian Wars Tournament may proceed, where the winner will receive the Sagittarius Golden Armor. Seiya faces Bronze Knight Bear Geki, and easily defeats him with one punch. The next match, Bronze Knight Cygnus Magnus vs. Bronze Knight Hydra Ichi, is put on hold as Magnus hasn't arrived yet. Just then, Magnus arrives and defeats Ichi with his Diamond Dust technique. However, before the next match can begin, Magnus attempts to assassinate Sienna.
3	3	"Enter The Dragon"	Yasuhiro Tanabe	Benjamin Townsend	July 19, 2019
Magnus confronts Sienna with her hosting of the Galaxian Wars Tournament, as well as the dark prophecy regarding her as the possible reincarnation of Athena. However, he is dissuaded from Sienna's words and stays his hand for the time being, confused by her words and his orders from the Sanctuary. Meanwhile, Seiya faces Bronze Knight Dragon Long, whose impenetrable shield deflects Seiya's Pegasus Meteor Fist technique effortlessly, while his right fist easily surpasses Seiya's defenses. Seiya eventually manages to see the weak point in Long's Lushan Rising Dragon Supremacy technique and manages to strike his heart at the last second, winning the match. However, the attack causes Long's heart to stop. Gathering enough strength, Seiya punches Long in the back, restoring Long back to life. Witnessing Seiya being willing to risk his own life in order to save Long causes further confusion with Magnus, wondering whether his orders were just or if there were some other reason for him to assassinate Sienna.
4	4	"Nebula Chain"	Hiroshi Kimura	Joelle Sellner	July 19, 2019
Bronze Knight Andromeda Shaun faces Bronze Knight Unicorn Jab, easily dodging his attacks before she retaliates and defeats Jab with his Nebula Chain technique. Shortly after, her chains start rattling before the box containing the Golden Armor suddenly opens, revealing that its right arm bracer is missing. The Bronze Knights then find themselves under attack and, upon exiting the underground base, find themselves confronted by a vast army of Guraad's soldiers. Following a vicious battle where they drive off Guraad's forces, Shaun's chains act up again, pointing at the Golden Armor. Just then, Bronze Knight Phoenix Nero, Shaun's older brother, emerges from the shadows, holding the right arm bracer of the Gold Armor. Upon restoring it to the Golden Armor, it transforms into a pendant and Nero takes it. Nero then suddenly attacks Shaun, before stating that she and the others are soon to die.
5	5	"The Black Knights"	Hiroshi Kimura	Travis Donnelly	July 19, 2019
Nero easily incapacitates Seiya, Long, Shaun and Magnus before taking off with the Golden Armor. The Bronze Knights rendezvous with Sienna and Mylock, where Magnus casts aside his earlier suspicions and confirms that Sienna truly is the reincarnation of Athena. Pledging their loyalty to Sienna, the Bronze Knights pursue Nero on his aircraft, knocking it down from the sky. Seiya arrives at the crash site first, where he confronts Nero, who has a group of Black Knights with him, created by Guraad who has managed to use the Sagittarius Golden Armor to create his own army of Knights. Seiya pursues Nero and the Black Knights into a cave, where one of them remains to challenge him. To Seiya's surprise, the Black Knight recognizes him and removes his helmet, revealing himself to be Cassios. Following his defeat, Cassios was ashamed that he had failed his master Silver Knight Ophiuchus Shaina, and thus accepted the proposal of becoming a Black Knight to exact revenge. Cassios overpowers Seiya, but a chip on his neck short-circuits, and he falls unconscious too. The other Bronze Knights arrive and, on Seiya's request, leave him behind and pursue Nero. They are confronted by the remaining Black Knights, who engage and overpower them. However, Shaun manages to find a way to defeat them, noticing that all Black Knights have a chip on the neck. Shortly after their victory, Nero emerges and challenges the three Bronze Knights to a deathmatch.
6	6	"Phoenix Rising"	Hiroshi Kimura	Benjamin Townsend	July 19, 2019
Shaun attempts to talk with Nero and convince him to not give in to hate. But Nero refuses, striking down Shaun before effortlessly neutralizing Long and Magnus' attacks. Meanwhile, at the Five Old Peaks of Lushan, the Old Master is visited by a man named Mū, who expresses concern over only observing as the Bronze Knights fight among themselves, wanting to take action and help. The Old Master advices him to remain calm and stay his hand for the time being. Back at the cave, the Bronze Knights are soundly defeated by Nero's Phoenix Wings Celestial Flight technique. Just then, Seiya appears, having used all his Cosmo to heal the worst of his injuries. Despite not having the strength to equip his Armor, Seiya battles Nero, receiving Shaun's Andrómeda Chain and Long's Dragon Shield to fight with. During his last attack, Magnus' Cosmo fuses with Seiya's, allowing him to finally overpower Nero. The Bronze Knights' victory is short-lived, however, as the volcano erupts and the cave starts to collapse.

==== Part 2 (2020) ====
No. overall	No. in season	Title	Directed by	Written by	Original release date
7	7	"The Silver Knights"	Yasuhiro Tanabe	Thomas Pugsley	January 23, 2020
Seiya awakens on a beach, being greeted by a kid named Kiki. His master, Mū, saved Seiya and the other Bronze Knights, except Nero, who had instructed Mū to save the others instead of him. Just then, Marin and the Silver Knight Lizard Misty arrive to assassinate Seiya, at the orders of the Grand Master. Seiya equips his Pegasusu Bronze Armor and engage Misty in battle, but he is no match for the more experienced warrior. Just as Misty is about to deal the final strike, however, Marin steps between and attacks Seiya instead. After burying him, the Silver Knights Hound Asterion and Whale Morris arrive with the corpses of Shaun, Magnus and Long. The Bronze Knights are buried but, as the Silver Knights are about to leave, Marin stays behind with a suspicious Misty, who digs Seiya, still alive, out of the grave. Incapacitating Marin for her betrayal, Misty and Seiya resume their battle. Seiya tackles Misty in order to retrieve his Armor, puts it on and breaks through Misty's defenses for the first time. He then turns the tables by reflecting Misty's Mavrou Trippa before finally killing him.
8	8	"The Rising Tide"	Yasuhiro Tanabe	Saundra Hall	January 23, 2020
Recovering from Misty's attack, and worried about Sienna's safety, Marin orders Seiya to return to protect her, after revealing that Shaun, Magnus and Long are still alive, the buried corpses being Black Knights. Once he leaves, she attempts to face Asterion and Morris by herself, once they return to check on Misty. The Silver Knights easily overpower her due to Asterion's mind-reading abilities, and they incapacitate her, forcing Seiya to turn back. Returning to the beach, Seiya battles Morris but is easily overpowered. When Morris lets slip that Marin might be his older sister, this fuels Seiya's rage, and he brutally kills Morris before attempting to save Marin. However, Asterion still blocks his path and, due to his mind-reading abilities, easily overpowers Seiya. Before he can kill Seiya, Marin appears, having freed herself during the commotion, and kills Asterion after clearing her mind. She then leaves Seiya questioning whether or not she truly is his older sister.
9	9	"To Fight For Athena"	Hiroshi Kimura	Shaene Siders	January 23, 2020
Seiya is reunited with Long, Magnus and Shaun who is saddened to learn that Nero refused to be saved, before they rendezvous with Sienna by the waterfalls. Discussing the prophecy about Sienna as Athena, Seiya promises to protect her regardless of whether the prophecy is true or not. Just then, a pair of crows emerge from the forest. The Bronze Knights rush to find Mylock unconscious and the Silver Knight Crow Jamian perching on a cliff. The four engage him but are easily overwhelmed by his army of crows, acting as Jamian's arms and legs. They are then covered in black feathers from the crows, immobilizing them. Seiya manages to break free and pursues Sienna, who has been abducted by the crows. Despite successfully saving her, Seiya lands on the edge of a cliff before he is confronted by Jamian and Shaina, who has arrived in her Ophiuchus Silver Armor for a rematch. Out of options, Seiya leaps off the cliff with Sienna, sprouting a pair of wings with his Cosmo that envelops and protects Sienna from the impact while he is injured from the impact. Jamian pursues the two while Shaina is confronted by the Silver Knights Perseus Argol and Cerberus Dante, who have also arrived to kill Sienna to prevent the prophecy from coming true. Jamian, terrified of Sienna's Cosmo as she attempts to defend Seiya, unleashes his crows at her, but he is easily defeated by Nero, who survived the explosion at the lava cave. Confronted by Argol and Dante, Nero easily overpowers and defeats Dante with one attack. Just as he is about to face Argol, Shaun's Andromeda Chains pierce the ground between them.
10	10	"The Challenge"	Hiroshi Kimura	Patrick Rieger	January 23, 2020
Shaun, Magnus and Long arrive to help Nero, who takes his leave, preferring to fight alone. As soon as he leaves, Argol uses his Medusa Shield to turn Shaun into stone. Remembering the legend of Perseus and Medusa, Magnus attempts to use his shield to get close but he is easily defeated and turned to stone as well. With Sienna slowly turning into stone as well, and out of options, Long injures his eyes and finally kills Argol, returning Sienna, Magnus and Shaun to normal. Meanwhile, at the Sanctuary, the Grand Master summons the Golden Knights Leo Aiolia and Scorpio Milo to assassinate the Bronze Knights, who have defeated almost all the Silver Knights. While visiting the orphanage which is now for sale, Seiya is visited by Shaina who tries to warn him of the Golden Knights. Upon Aiolia's arrival, Seiya recognizes him as the one who abducted Patricia, Seiya equips his Pegasus Bronze Armor and challenges Aiolia to a fight. However, he is no match as Aiolia moves at the speed of light. Trying to kill Seiya, Aiolia instead strikes Shaina who steps between, and reveals that she has fallen in love with Seiya. When all hope seems lost for Seiya, the Sagittarius Golden Armor suddenly wraps itself around Seiya, allowing him to fight at Aiolia's level, managing to harm him. Trying to remind Aiolia of the Knights' duty to protect Athena, regardless of the prophecy and seeking vengeance for his older sister's supposed death, Seiya's attempts to overpower Aiolia are useless. Just then, Sienna and the Bronze Knights arrive, having sensed Seiya's Cosmo. Sienna convinces Aiolia of the prophecy of Athena and the Pegasus Bronze Knight, causing Aiolia to swear allegiance to Sienna. Before leaving with Shaina, Aiolia reveals that Patricia isn't dead and is instead lost, as she abandoned her training but has not been located. Meanwhile, its objective completed, the Sagittarius Golden Armor discards itself from Seiya's body, before heading off. Returning to the Grand Master's chambers, Aiolia attempts to defeat the Grand Master but is stopped by Golden Knight Virgo Shaka, and the two Gold Knights lock themselves in a one-thousand-days-war.
11	11	"The Prophecy"	Yoshiharu Ashino	Eugene Son	January 23, 2020
Having finally completed his research on the Knights and perfected the armors for the Black Knights, Vander Guraad assembles his army with the intention of killing Sienna and ensure the prophecy of mankind's downfall never comes to pass, as well as kill every other god. On Guraad's orders, three Black Knights ambush Seiya and Sienna while on a walk, abducting Sienna and bringing her to Guraad. While Guraad confirms to Sienna that Alman has died, the Bronze Knights ambush the compound, battling the Black Knights as they attempt to reach Sienna in time. Seiya makes it just in time to save her from Guraad's assassination attempt. Sienna's attempt to convince Guraad to fight with them instead of against them fails, and they head for the helipad to rendezvous with Mylock. With every single Black Knight summoned, the Bronze Knights desperately attempt to help Sienna reach the Cosmo canister at the bottom of the compound, in order for her to release the Cosmo. Reaching the underground, Sienna uses her Cosmo to destroy the canister while Seiya attempts to fend off the Black Knights who pursued them.
12	12	"One War Ends, Another Begins"	Yoshiharu Ashino	Eugene Son	January 23, 2020
Sienna successfully destroys the Cosmo canister before fleeing with Seiya as the entire mountain compound begins to crumble from the explosion. Rendezvousing at the helipad, the Bronze Knights are locked in a desperate struggle against the Black Knights until Mylock arrives. Despite their victory, Sienna is saddened by the realization that her grandfather is truly gone while the Bronze Knights discuss her burden as Athena. Just then, their helicopter is attacked and crashes into the mountains. Upon exiting, they are confronted by Guraad in his own Black Knight Armor. Despite outnumbering him four to one, the Bronze Knights are easily defeated one after the other, until only Seiya remains standing. However, with Guraad's upgraded armor, he has amassed Cosmo beyond the Bronze Knights' level, and he easily overwhelms Seiya, beating him effortlessly. However, regardless of how many times he attacks, Guraad is surprised by Seiya's refusal to stand down. Believing in Sienna, and his determination to protect her at all costs, causes Seiya's Pegasus Bronze Armor to sprout wings, confirming his destiny as the Pegasus Bronze Knight. His strength increased, he releases an overwhelming amount of Cosmo, destroying Guraad's Cosmo-absorber before killing him. However, their victory is short-lived as a golden arrow is shot from a portal, hitting Sieanna directly in the heart.

=== Season 2: Battle for Sanctuary (2022-2024) ===
==== Part 1 (2022) ====
No. overall	No. in season	Title	Directed by	Written by	Original release date
13	1	"The Twelve Houses"	Yoshiharu Ashino	Henry Gilroy	July 31, 2022
At the Five Ancient Peaks of Lushan, Old Master is visited by the Golden Knight Cancer DeathMask who has been sent from Sanctuary to assassinate him, who is revealed to be the Golden Knight Libra Dōko who has refused the Grand Master's summons. Deathmask's attempt to send Dōko to the Underworld is thwarted by the arrival of Mū, revealed to be the Aries Golden Knight. After Deathmask departs, Mū informs Dōko that Athena has been shot by a god-killer arrow and is dying. Uncertain of whether to trust Dōko or the prophecy, Mū returns to the Sanctuary. Meanwhile, the Bronze Knights are attacked by the Silver Knight Sagitta Tremy, who fired the first arrow that pierced Sienna. Seiya overcomes Tremy's attack and defeats him. Just before dying, however, Tremy warns them that they only have 12 hours to remove it and the Grand Master is the only one capable of doing this. With no time to waste, the Bronze Knights, Mylock and Sienna rush through the portal and reach the Sanctuary. According to Magnus, there are Twelve Houses of the Zodiac they must break through in order to reach the Chamber of the Grand Master, and each House of the Zodiac is guarded by a Golden Knight. Arriving at the first House, Aries, the Bronze Knights are immobilized by Mū's psychokinesis. Discovering the arrow and already believing it to be too late, he urges the Bronze Knights to give up. However, Sienna's words and the Bronze Knights breaking free from his psychokinesis, convinces Mū to repair their Bronze Armors and instruct them about the Ultimate Cosmo that Gold Knights possess: The Seventh Sense. Arriving at the House of Taurus, the Bronze Knights are confronted by its guardian, Taurus Aldebaran. Seiya attempts to distract him, but Aldebaran incapacitates Long, Shaun and Magnus in an instant, leaving Seiya to fight him alone.
14	2	"The Seventh Sense"	Yoshiharu Ashino	Marty Isenberg	July 31, 2022
Seiya attempts to fight Aldebaran but is easily overwhelmed by his speed. Failing to understand why someone with so much power will serve the Grand Master, Seiya attempts to make Aldebaran realize his errors. Aldebaran, who has seen the Grand Master as a benevolent man willing to personally visit a dying soldier and ease his pain, fails to understand Seiya's statement of him being evil. Instead, Aldebaran attempts to convince Seiya that the reason is because of the dark prophecy the Altar Silver Armor has foretold of Athena's current reincarnation. Attempting to finish the fight in an instant, Aldebaran attacks Seiya before burying him beneath the ground. However, Seiya remembers Marin's teachings about reaching the true potential of Cosmo, allowing him to return to the surface and continue his fight with Aldebaran. Attacking again, Seiya manages to unleash a power equal to the Big Bang, breaking Aldebaran's defensive posture. To Aldebaran's surprise, each time he attacks, Seiya's Cosmo increases to the point where he successfully awakens his Seventh Sense for the first time, repels Aldebaran's attack and cuts off one of his golden horns. Accepting defeat, Aldebaran allows Seiya and the other Bronze Knights to pass through his House, warning them of the dangers the other Golden Knights possess. Upon arriving at the third House, Gemini, the Bronze Knights end up at the entrance every time they attempt to pass through. Eventually, the House splits into two separate entrances, forcing them to split up, Seiya going with Long while Shaun goes with Magnus. Upon entering the House this time, Shaun and Magnus are confronted by the Gemini Golden Knight, who finally reveals himself.
15	3	"Andromeda Island"	Taku Yonebayashi	Anne Mortensen-Agnew	August 7, 2022
At Andromeda Island, the Silver Knight Cepheus Daedalus, Shaun's master, is attacked by the Golden Knight Pisces Aphrodite on the Grand Master's orders. Despite putting up a fight, he is easily outmatched. Daedalus' other apprentice, Chameleon Genet who was originally sent away for her own safety, returns after sensing Daedalus' Cosmo fading. Before dying, Daedalus instructs her to go to Star Hill. After burying him, she encounters Marin who realizes that the Sanctuary battle has finally begun. It is revealed that Daedalus was aware of the evil lurking in the Sanctuary and had dispatched Shaun to fight in the Galaxian Wars Tournament in order to draw the enemy's attention, this being Dōko and Marin's reasons for sending Long and Seiya to the tournament as well. Relaying Daedalus' final words to Marin, Genet decides to accompany Marin when she decides to go to Star Hill in order to discover the meaning behind Daedalus' words. Meanwhile, at the House of Gemini, Shaun attempts to negotiate with the Gemini Golden Knight to let them pass, not sensing any hostility from him. However, when her attempts fail, Magnus attempts to defeat Gemini, but all his attacks are repelled without any effort, incapacitating Magnus. In the other House, Seiya and Long encounter the Gemini Golden Knight as well, but Long manages to discover, due to his blindness, that the Knight in front of them is just an illusion and they charge straight at Gemini, thus passing through the House successfully. With Magnus unconscious, Shaun attempts to fight Gemini, but he easily passes through her defenses before sending Magnus into another dimension while Shaun is left at his mercy.
16	4	"Cold Hearted"	Taku Yonebayashi	Chris Wyatt; Kevin Burke	August 14, 2022
During their childhood, Shaun and Nero wandered the streets, having not eaten for days. While going to get some bread for them, Shaun was attacked by feral dogs. In fear, Shaun accidentally awakened her Cosmo. This drew the attention of a pair of Sanctuary guards who had been sent to that town to discover someone with Cosmo. They attempted to abduct Shaun, but Nero fended them off before their superior, Guilty, confronted the siblings. Refusing to let him abduct Shaun, Nero attempted to fight him, awakening his own Cosmo in the process. Taking an interest in his Cosmo and anger, Guilty abducted Nero instead and retreated with him to Death Queen Island. Back in the present, at the House of Gemini, Shaun is saved by Nero's Cosmo attacking Gemini Golden Knight, disrupting the attack and allowing Shaun to see the exit. However, refusing to leave Magnus behind, and remembering Daedalus' words of there being a time when she has to fight for those she cares about, she instead returns to face Gemini Golden Knight, determined to defeat him at any cost. At that moment, Gemini Golden Knight scolds her for returning before informing her of Daedalus' death by Aphrodite. Her anger allows her to awaken her Seventh Sense, block Gemini Golden Knight's attack and successfully strike him, disrupting the illusion. Determined to avenge Daedalus' death, Shaun rushes after Seiya and Long. Meanwhile, Magnus awakens to find himself in Siberia right next to the hole he created to visit his deceased mother. Upon visiting her, the ship suddenly starts to move before sinking further into the deep, devastating Magnus. He is then confronted by his master, Golden Knight Aquarius Camus who scolds him for still holding onto emotions of his dead mother, having taught him to remain cold hearted in any situation, tossing him to the House of Libra through a portal. Camus scolds him for siding with Athena instead of assassinating her, which was his orders from Camus with the Grand Master's permission, and provokes him into a fight. However, Magnus' attack has no effect against his master, and he is easily defeated and sealed in a freezing coffin, said to never melt.
17	5	"The Land of the Dead"	Taku Yonebayashi	Julien Magnat	August 21, 2022
Seiya and Long arrive at the House of Cancer, where they are confronted by Deathmask. Infuriated by Deathmask's collection of human faces, even children, decorating his House and his earlier attempt to assassinate Dōko drives Long into a vengeful fury, swearing to defeat Deathmask in the name of justice, while Seiya is ordered to continue to the House of Leo. All of Long's attacks are avoided and he's sent to the Underworld, where he regains his ability to see. Guided back by Sienna's Cosmo, Long resumes his fight with Deathmask, although he is overpowered and sent to the Underworld once again. At the House of Aries, Mū and Aldebaran watch over Sienna along with Mylock and Kiki. Just then, Marin and Genet arrive, informing the Gold Knights about Daedalus' demise as well as his last words. Admiring their enthusiasm, Mū and Aldebaran decide to accompany them to Star Hill. Meanwhile, a worried Shunrei begins praying for Long's safety, aware that he's facing Deathmask. In the Underworld, Deathmask arrives to personally ensure that Long truly dies by attempting to toss him down Yomotsu Hirasaka. Annoyed at Shunrei's prayers, Deathmask tosses her down the waterfall. This causes Long's Cosmo to explode in rage.
18	6	"Rebirth of the Rising Dragon"	Taku Yonebayashi	Danielle Wolff	August 28, 2022
Long, with renewed rage, overwhelms Deathmask, swearing to kill him for having hurt Shunrei, the only person he truly loved. However, despite getting in several hits, Deathmask remains unscathed due to the protection from his Cancer Golden Armor, and he quickly gains the upper hand once more during their fight. Trying to appeal to the conscience of the Cancer Armor, Long eventually manages to reach it, as its leg piece detaches and Long manages to break Deathmask's leg before the remaining Armor completely abandons Deathmask. However, having pride as a warrior, Long discards his own Dragon Bronze Armor and faces Deathmask in a final clash of Cosmo, awakening his Seventh Sense and finally killing Deathmask by throwing him down Yomotsu Hirasaka. Returning to the world of the living, Long rendezvous with Shaun and discovers he now has his eyesight back. At the Grand Master's chambers, Aphrodite offers to eliminate the Bronze Knights at once, having sensed Deathmask's fall. However, the Grand Master, acting different than usual, orders Aphrodite to stand down, causing him to wonder about the Grand Master's true self while also expecting a glorius battle at the House of Leo. Upon arrival, Seiya is immediately attacked by Aiolia, who acts differently from last time they met. Sensing Seiya's Cosmo at the House of Leo, Shaka remembers their battle which was interrupted when the Grand Master cast the Emperor Demonic Misty Illusion Fist on Aioila, explaining Aiolia's aggressiveness towards Seiya. Attempting to fight back, Seiya is struck down repeatedly by Aiolia's light-speed attacks, being unable to see them unlike last time, when he was wearing the Sagittarius Golden Armor. Realizing this, Seiya explodes his Cosmo, managing to see through Aiolia's attack for the first time, evading them and landing a kick to his face.
19	7	"Battle for the House of Leo"	Taku Yonebayashi	Benjamin Townsend	September 4, 2022
Seiya's kick seems to have no effect for Aiolia except driving him into a frenzy, as he viciously strikes Seiya, breaking his leg in the process. Seiya is entirely at Aiolia's mercy until Cassios suddenly arrives. Cassios informs Seiya that Aiolia has been struck by the Emperor Demonic Misty Illusion Fist and this is why Aiolia is nothing more than a killing machine. He can only be awoken if someone dies in front of him. Much to Seiya and Aiolia's surprise, Cassios pierces his own body, being willing to take his own life in order to have Aiolia awaken, as he realizes that Shaina would be sad if Seiya died. Having cared for her ever since she was returned to Sanctuary by Aiolia, Cassios came to realize that Shaina loved Seiya and wishes for nothing else but her happiness. Not wanting her to die in order to save Seiya, Cassios decided to go instead by knocking her out. Entrusting her to Seiya, Cassios succumbs to his wounds. This causes Aiolia to temporarily break free from mind control before succumbing to its power again, resuming his vicious onslaught on Seiya. Meanwhile, at the House of Aries, a trio of Sanctuary guards approach Mylock and Sienna, determined to kill Sienna themselves to prevent the prophecy from coming true. Mylock is easily defeated, but Sienna's Cosmo overwhelms the guards and they flee in terror. At the House of Leo, Seiya briefly brings Aiolia back again by evading one of his attacks and retaliate. Refusing to let Cassios' death be in vain, Seiya awakens his Seventh Sense and finally overpowers Aiolia with his Pegasus Meteor Fist, bringing him back to his senses.
20	8	"The Skull Knights"	Yasuhiro Tanabe	Katie Kaniewski	September 11, 2022
Shaun and Long arrive at the House of Leo, rendezvousing with Seiya. After healing Seiya's broken leg, Aiolia warns them about Shaka, instructing them to never let him open his eyes, or they are guaranteed to die. After they have left, Aiolia is confronted by Milo, who has been there since Seiya entered the House. Admitting he admires the Bronze Knights determination although they are enemies, Milo confronts Aiolia about letting them pass through his House and decides to execute him for betraying the Grand Master. The Golden Knights are initially equal until Milo immobilizes Aiolia. Before Milo can continue, the Grand Master communicates with him through his Cosmo, instructing him to stand down. Meanwhile, Mū, Aldebaran, Marin and Genet travel through the forest to reach Star Hill. On the way, Mū expresses doubts about whether the Grand Master is his master Shion or not. Aiolos' voice causes Marin to remember when she first put on the mask after promising Aiolos that she would protect Athena, no matter what. Meanwhile, on the path to the House of Virgo, the Bronze Knights are confronted by a horde of skull Knights willing to test their strength. The Bronze Knights' attacks are useless as the skull Knights keep reassembling themselves. Shaun eventually creates an opening, allowing Seiya and Long to continue while she stays behind. Another skull Knight appears, intending to test their hearts by igniting the path in flames. Long understands the meaning of the test and allows the flames to engulf him before directly attacking the skull Knight, dissipating the flames for Seiya to break through. Finally, Seiya encounters a skull Knight intending to test his will.
21	9	"Reflections"	Yasuhiro Tanabe	Patrick Rieger	September 18, 2022
Seiya attacks the skull Knight and blasts it apart. However, upon reassembly, it grows in size to a massive skeleton, rendering Seiya's attacks useless. However, Seiya manages to get close and crushes the skeleton, passing the test and being reunited with Long and Shaun who made it as well. Mū, Aldebaran, Marin and Genet finally arrive at the bottom of Star Hill. To Genet's annoyance, Kiki has arrived as well, having entrusted the care of Sienna to Mylock and wanting to help. After revealing a secret entrance, Kiki and the Knights enter Star Hill. They are surrounded by pitch black darkness, with Genet and Kiki ending up together while both Mū and Aldebaran are drawn into the mirror realm by their reflections. Inside the mirror realm, Mū and Aldebaran engage in combat with their reflections. Marin comes across a reflection of Patricia crying for Seiya, but passes through without any doubt. The Golden Knights defeat their counterparts while Genet and Kiki come across a reflection of Daedalus.
22	10	"The One as Powerful as a God"	Yasuhiro Tanabe	Callie C. Miller	September 25, 2022
Genet, convinced that the Daedalus in front of her is real, is overjoyed to see her master alive and well but is attacked upon approaching him, to her and Kiki's shock. Attempting to fight back, Genet is easily overwhelmed and at Daedalus' mercy. However, her determination and wanting to help Shaun helps her overcome her doubt, and she overcomes Daedalus' attack and defeats him. At the House of Virgo, Long attempts to negotiate with Shaka to allow them to pass, due to his meditating pose not giving off any threatening presence. However, he strikes Seiya as he attempts to rush through, taking on the Bronze Knights and defeating them without any effort. Shaun, still conscious, stands up and attempts to attack Shaka, but her chain is repelled and wraps her to a column instead. Just as Shaka is about to deal the final strike, a phoenix feather slices Shaka's finger. Just then, Nero appears to face Shaka and return the pain he has caused on the others. However, upon facing Shaka as an enemy makes Nero remember how he was at Shaka's mercy when he first got the Phoenix Bronze Armor. Shaka, out of mercy, spared Nero's life that day but erased the memory of them meeting, but promised that if Nero were to face Shaka again, that memory would re-emerge along with the terror he felt back then. Paralyzed with fear and wondering if Shaka is the manifestation of Buddha, Nero is at the mercy of Shaka's Six Paths of Reincarnation. However, much to Shaka's surprise, Nero stands up and knocks off his helmet with a counterattack before promising Shaka that he shall witness true hell this time.
23	11	"Heaven's Treasure"	Yasuhiro Tanabe	Danielle Wolff	October 2, 2022
Despite being hit with Nero's Phoenix Demonic Ilusion Fist, Shaka is unfazed and instead reflects the attack to affect Nero's mind, showing him and an infant Shaun walking along the River Styx. Shaka tortures Nero and attempts to make him let go off Shaun to save himself from endless pain. Shaun manages to make Nero snap out of it, before she warns him about not allowing Shaka to open his eyes. Before the fight goes further, Shaun manages to break free and attempts to fight Shaka instead, but he knocks her unconscious before removing Nero's Phoenix Bronze Armor. Nero attempts to fight back but is burned to ashes. Just as Shaka believes the fight to be over, Nero emerges from the burning ashes with his Armor restored. Despite attacking four times in a row, Nero is unable to land a hit on Shaka who knocks him to the ground in an instant. Unleashing his ultimate attack, Shaka finally opens his eyes, destroying Nero's Armor once again and starting to deprive him of his senses, one after the other. His attempt to send Nero to one of the six realms is thwarted by Shaun. To both their surprise, Nero still attempts to fight Shaka, due to his brain still functioning, but Shaka removes that sense as well, leaving only Nero's heart beating. However, this allows Nero to awaken his Seventh Sense. Having realized that Shaka shut off his sense of sight in order to strengthen his Cosmo, Nero allowed Shaka to remove all six of his senses so he could strengthen his Cosmo beyond Shaka's. In a kamikaze attack, Nero blasts himself and Shaka away but not before Nero says Shaun to fight as a woman to the end, leaving only the Golden Virgo Armor behind. Shaun is devastated at Nero's sacrifice, but pulls herself together and, along with Seiya and Long, head for the House of Libra.
24	12	"The Secrets of Sanctuary"	Yasuhiro Tanabe	Thomas Pugsley	October 9, 2022
The Bronze Knights arrive at the seventh House, Libra, where they find Magnus encased in freezing coffin. Despite his best attempts, Seiya is unable to even scratch the surface of the ice. Just then, Long's master appears before them before summoning the Libra Golden Armor to help them. Long chooses one of the Two Libra Swords which successfully shatters the ice and saves Magnus. However, there is no pulse. Seiya and Long keep moving, leaving Shaun behind to grieve Magnus. Meanwhile, Mū, Aldebaran, Marin, Genet and Kiki reach the top of Star Hill. Just as they are about to enter the Grand Master's Chamber, Mū notices the figure of the Grand Master collapsing. Before they are able to react, a powerful blast incapacitates Mū and Aldebaran, before the Grand Master appears before Marin, Genet and Kiki. Marin attempts to fight the Grand Master, but no-one except the Grand Master may freely use their Cosmo while at Star Hill, and he easily overpowers them before attempting to kill all three at once. At the House of Aries, the three Sanctuary guards from before arrive, now accompanied by Cerberus Dante, who survived his fight with Nero, to kill Sienna. Seiya and Long arrive at the eight House, Scorpio, where they are confronted by Milo. Despite being impressed by their resolve, Milo easily defeats them both but is surprised when Seiya still manages to stand up and burn his Cosmo. At the House of Libra, Shaun hears Magnus' heartbeat and resolves to burn all her Cosmo in order to restore warmth to his body, putting her life on the line. Genet and Kiki, having survived the Grand Master's attack due to Marin saving them, decide to return to Sanctuary with the information they have obtained. Mylock's attempts to fend off Dante are in vain. Just then, Jab, Ban, Ichi, Geki and Nach arrive to protect Sienna. At the House of Scorpio, Seiya keeps fighting, much to Milo's surprise.

==== Part 2 (2024) ====
No. overall	No. in season	Title	Directed by	Written by	Original release date
25	13	"The Cygnus and the Scorpius"	Taku Yonebayashi	Eugene Son	April 1, 2024
26	14	"Jab's Courage"	Taku Yonebayashi	Becky Wangberg; Sarah Eisenberg	April 1, 2024
27	15	"Return to the Land of the Dead"	Taku Yonebayashi	Jennifer Muro	April 8, 2024
28	16	"Aiolos's Last Words"	Taku Yonebayashi	Jeremiah Smith	April 15, 2024
29	17	"A Leap of Faith"	Yasuhiro Tanabe	Meredith Kecskemety	April 22, 2024
30	18	"Absolute Zero"	Yasuhiro Tanabe	Danielle Wolff	April 29, 2024
31	19	"Royal Demon Roses"	Yasuhiro Tanabe	Meredith Kecskemety	May 6, 2024
32	20	"Andromeda's Sacrifice"	Yasuhiro Tanabe	Jenny DeArmitt	May 13, 2024
33	21	"Death Match in the Grand Master's Chamber"	Satoshi Nohzawa	Matt S. Wayne	May 20, 2024
34	22	"The Man with Two Faces"	Satoshi Nohzawa	Denise Downer	May 27, 2024
35	23	"The Face of the Grand Master"	Satoshi Nohzawa	Ta'riq Fisher	June 3, 2024
36	24	"To Save Athena!"	Satoshi Nohzawa	Eugene Son	June 10, 2024

== Reception ==
The show overall received mixed reviews. Initial backlash to the series began before it aired, when it was revealed that Shun, a male in the original manga and anime series, had been swapped to a female character. Writer Eugene Son justified this change after thinking the Knights needed more female representation, explaining that the one thing that bothered him about the original show was that "the Bronze Knights with Pegasus Seiya are all dudes". However, this decision received backlash from fans of the original series for a multitude of reasons. One example includes the complete erasure of explanation for Shaina's mask. The gender swap of Shun, who was the only main male character of the original series who did not fit in the stereotype of the male hero - slightly effeminate, sensitive and opposed to fighting - was seen as special interest pandering by some and reinforcing gender stereotypes by others.

The Review Geek rated the series 3.5 out of 10. Ready Steady Cut gave a 2.5 out of 5 rating and called the show "dull and uninspiring".
