= Saint Seiya: The Hades Chapter =

Japanese original video animation

- key visual for Saint Saiya: The Hades Chapter – Sanctuary

聖闘士星矢(セイントセイヤ) 冥王ハーデス編 (Seinto Seiya Meio Hādesu Hen)
- Created by: Masami Kurumada
- Original video animation

Sanctuary
- Directed by: Shigeyasu Yamauchi
- Written by: Michiko Yokote
- Music by: Seiji Yokoyama
- Studio: Toei Animation
- Released: November 9, 2002 – April 12, 2003
- Episodes: 13
- Original video animation

Inferno
- Directed by: Tomoharu Katsumata
- Written by: Yōsuke Kuroda
- Music by: Seiji Yokoyama
- Studio: Toei Animation
- Released: December 17, 2005 – June 2, 2007
- Episodes: 12
- Original video animation

Elysion
- Directed by: Tomoharu Katsumata
- Written by: Yōsuke Kuroda
- Music by: Seiji Yokoyama
- Studio: Toei Animation
- Released: March 7, 2008 – August 1, 2008
- Episodes: 6
- icon

Saint Seiya: The Hades Chapter (Japanese: 聖闘士星矢(セイントセイヤ) 冥王ハーデス編, Hepburn: Seinto Seiya Meio Hādesu Hen) is a Japanese original video animation (OVA) series based on the manga series Saint Seiya by Masami Kurumada, adapting the final chapters of the manga. Produced by Toei Animation, the series serves as a sequel to the 1986–89 television series and was released in three parts from 2003 to 2008, first on pay-per-view television, then on home video. An animated film, titled Saint Seiya: Heaven Chapter – Overture, was released in 2004, serving as the final continuation of the story.

== Cast ==
Character	Voice actor	
Character	Sanctuary	Inferno & Elysion
Pegasus Seiya	Tōru Furuya	Masakazu Morita
Dragon Shiryū	Hirotaka Suzuoki	Takahiro Sakurai
Cygnus Hyoga	Kōichi Hashimoto	Hiroaki Miura
Andromeda Shun	Ryō Horikawa	Yūta Kazuya
Phoenix Ikki	Hideyuki Hori	Katsuyuki Konishi
Saori Kido / Athena	Keiko Han	Fumiko Orikasa
Narrator	Hideyuki Tanaka	Hideyuki Tanaka

== Release ==
The first part, Sanctuary (十二宮編, Jūnikyū-hen; lit. 'Zodiac Chapter'), was directed by Shigeyasu Yamauchi, still with designs by Shingo Araki and Michi Himeno, with series composition by Michiko Yokote, and the soundtrack was lifted from the TV series. It consists of 13 episodes, and before its release on home video, it was broadcast on the direct-to-home satellite platform SKY PerfecTV! from November 9, 2002, to April 12, 2003, with the episodes released by Bandai Visual on seven DVDs from January 25 to July 25, 2003.

The second part, Inferno (冥界編, Meikai-hen; lit. 'Underworld Chapter'), consists of 12 episodes; from this part onwards, all of the characters were recast and features a different staff than Sanctuary. The first six episodes were broadcast on SKY PerfecTV! from December 17, 2005, to February 18, 2006, and were released on three DVDs by Avex from February 22 to April 26, 2006; the following six episodes were broadcast on Perfect Choice from December 15, 2006, to February 18, 2007, and were released on three DVDs by Avex from January 31 to March 28, 2007.

The final part, Elysion (エリシオン編, Erishion-hen; lit. 'Elysion Chapter'), consists of six episodes, which premiered on Perfect Choice from March 7 to August 1, 2008, and were released on three DVDs from March 28 to August 22, 2008.

In North America, all three series debuted on Netflix on February 22, 2015. The series later ran on Crunchyroll in 2016 and on Tubi in 2021, the latter as part of a wider addition of content from Toei Animation.

== Music ==
Seiji Yokoyama returned to compose the music, making the only staff member from the original 1986 series to return.

For the first part of The Hades Chapter, Sanctuary, the opening theme is "Chikyūgi" (地球ぎ; lit. 'Earth') and the ending theme "Kimi to Onaji Aozora" (君と同じ青空; lit. 'The Same Blue Sky As You'); both songs were performed by Yumi Matsuzawa. For the second and third parts, Inferno and Elysion, the opening theme is "Megami no Senshi: Pegasus Forever" (女神の戦士 〜Pegasus Forever〜; lit. 'Goddess Warrior: Pegasus Forever'), performed by Marina Del Ray. The ending theme for Inferno is "Takusu Mono e: My Dear" (託す者へ 〜My Dear〜; lit. 'To the One I Entrust: My Dear'), performed by Matsuzawa, and the ending theme for Elysion is "Kami no En: Del Regno" (神の園 ～Del Regno～; Japanese and Italian for 'The Garden of God' and 'From the Kingdom' respectively), performed by Yūko Ishibashi; Kurumada contributed to the latter song, expressing satisfaction with the result.
