= List of books from the Richard & Judy Book Club =

Book Catalogue

The following is a list of books from the Richard & Judy Book Club, featured on the television chat show. The show was cancelled in 2009, but since 2010 the lists have been continued by the Richard and Judy Book Club, a website run in conjunction with retailer W. H. Smith.

== Main list ==
2004

- Monica Ali – Brick Lane
- Martina Cole – The Know
- William Dalrymple – White Mughals
- Zoë Heller – Notes on a Scandal
- David Nicholls – Starter for Ten
- Joseph O'Connor – Star of the Sea
- Alice Sebold – The Lovely Bones (winner)
- Åsne Seierstad – The Bookseller of Kabul
- Nigel Slater – Toast: The Story of a Boy's Hunger
- Adriana Trigiani – Lucía, Lucía

2005

- William Brodrick – The Sixth Lamentation
- Paula Byrne – Perdita: The Life of Mary Robinson
- Justin Cartwright – The Promise of Happiness
- Karen Joy Fowler – The Jane Austen Book Club
- Chris Heath – Feel: Robbie Williams
- David Mitchell – Cloud Atlas (winner)
- Audrey Niffenegger – The Time Traveler's Wife
- Jodi Picoult – My Sister's Keeper
- Andrew Taylor – The American Boy
- Carlos Ruiz Zafón – The Shadow of the Wind

2006

- Julian Barnes – Arthur & George
- Richard Benson – The Farm
- Geraldine Brooks – March
- Michael Connelly – The Lincoln Lawyer
- Martin Davies – The Conjuror's Bird
- Nicole Krauss – The History of Love
- Anchee Min – Empress Orchid
- Kate Mosse – Labyrinth (winner)
- Eva Rice – The Lost Art of Keeping Secrets
- Andrew Smith – Moondust: In Search of the Men Who Fell to Earth

2007

- Chimamanda Ngozi Adichie – Half of a Yellow Sun
- William Boyd – Restless
- A. M. Homes – This Book Will Save Your Life
- Lori Lansens – The Girls
- James Robertson – The Testament of Gideon Mack
- Griff Rhys Jones – Semi-detached
- Jed Rubenfeld – The Interpretation of Murder (winner)
- Catherine Ryan Hyde – Love in the Present Tense

2008

- Danny Scheinmann – Random Acts of Heroic Love
- Katharine McMahon – Rose of Sebastopol
- Roger Jon Ellory – A Quiet Belief in Angels
- Patrick Gale – Notes from an Exhibition
- Joshua Ferris – Then We Came to the End
- Mark Slouka – Visible World
- Lloyd Jones – Mister Pip
- Tim Butcher – Blood River
- Peter Ho Davies – The Welsh Girl
- Khaled Hosseini – A Thousand Splendid Suns (winner)

2009

- Jesse Kellerman – The Brutal Art
- Kate Summerscale – The Suspicions of Mr Whicher
- Andrew Davidson – The Gargoyle
- Kate Atkinson – When Will There Be Good News?
- David Ebershoff – The 19th Wife
- Frances Osborne – The Bolter: Idina Sackville-The Woman Who Scandalised 1920s Society and Became White Mischief's Infamous Seductress
- Joseph O'Neill – Netherland
- Beatrice Colin – The Luminous Life of Lilly Aphrodite
- Elizabeth H. Winthrop – December
- Steven Galloway – The Cellist of Sarajevo

== Summer book lists ==
2004

- Jennifer Donnelly – A Gathering Light
- P. J. Tracy – Want to Play?
- Cecelia Ahern – PS, I Love You
- Maile Meloy – Liars and Saints
- Ben Richards – The Mermaid and the Drunks
- Bella Pollen – Hunting Unicorns

2005

- Karen Quinn – The Ivy Chronicles
- George Hagen – The Laments
- Anthony Capella – The Food of Love
- Susan Fletcher – Eve Green
- Ben Sherwood – The Death and Life of Charlie St. Cloud
- David Wolstencroft – Good News, Bad News

2006

- Jim Lynch – The Highest Tide
- Sam Bourne – The Righteous Men
- Victoria Hislop – The Island
- Dorothy Koomson – My Best Friend's Girl
- Elisabeth Hyde – The Abortionist's Daughter
- Elizabeth Kostova – The Historian

2007

- Kim Edwards – The Memory Keeper's Daughter
- Simon Kernick – Relentless
- Kate Morton – The House at Riverton
- Paul Torday – Salmon Fishing in the Yemen
- Jane Fallon – Getting Rid of Matthew
- Mark Mills – The Savage Garden
- Jonathan Tropper – How to talk to a Widower
- Mary Lawson – The Other Side of the Bridge

2008

- Sadie Jones – The Outcast
- Linwood Barclay – No Time For Goodbye
- Julia Gregson – East of the Sun
- John Hart – Down River
- Margret Cezair – The Pirate's Daughter
- Rebecca Miller – The Private Lives of Pippa Lee
- Toni Jordan – Addition
- James Bradley – The Resurrectionist

2009

- Julian Fellowes – Past Imperfect
- Dave Boling – Guernica
- Stephen L. Carter – Palace Council
- Charles Elton – Mr Toppit
- Jill Dawson – The Great Lover
- Colin Bateman – Mystery Man
- Sue Miller – The Senator's Wife
- Janice Y. K. Lee – The Piano Teacher

== Website book lists ==
2010 – Winter

- Rosamund Lupton – Sister
- Delphine de Vigan – No and Me
- Jo Nesbø – The Snowman
- Naseem Rakha – The Crying Tree
- Thomas Trofimuk – Waiting for Columbus
- Maria McCann – The Wilding
- Rachel Hore – A Place of Secrets
- Ben Macintyre – Operation Mincemeat

2011 – Spring

- Nigel Farndale – The Blasphemer
- Helen Simonson – Major Pettigrew's Last Stand
- Lucinda Riley – Hothouse Flower
- Suzanne Bugler – This Perfect World
- Emma Donoghue – Room
- Gregg Hurwitz – You're Next
- Rose Tremain – Trespass
- Sarah Blake – The Postmistress

2011 – Summer

- Sarah Winman – When God Was a Rabbit
- Suzannah Dunn – The Confessions of Katherine Howard
- Jed Rubenfeld – The Death Instinct
- Natasha Solomons – The Novel in the Viola
- Erin Kelly – The Poison Tree
- Elizabeth Speller – The Return of Captain John Emmett
- Anna Quindlen – Every Last One
- Bella Pollen – The Summer of the Bear

2011 – Autumn

- Megan Abbott – The End Of Everything
- Aimee Bender – The Particular Sadness of Lemon Cake
- Peter May – The Blackhouse
- Lisa Genova – Left Neglected
- Michelle Paver – Dark Matter
- Carol Birch – Jamrach's Menagerie
- Araminta Hall – Everything and Nothing
- David Hosp – Next of Kin

2012 – Spring

- Amanda Brooke – Yesterday's Sun
- Louisa Young – My Dear i Wanted To Tell You
- Paula McLain – The Paris Wife
- S. J. Watson – Before I Go To Sleep
- Mons Kallentoft – Midwinter Sacrifice
- Jojo Moyes – Me Before You
- Alison Littlewood – A Cold Season
- Rachel Simon – The Story of Beautiful Girl

2012 – Summer

- Victoria Hislop – The Thread
- Erin Morgenstern – The Night Circus
- Louise Douglas – The Secret Between Us
- Laura Harrington – Alice Bliss
- Shelley Harris – Jubilee
- Robert Harris – The Fear Index
- Lars Kepler – The Hypnotist
- Penny Hancock – Tideline
- Emylia Hall – The Book Of Summers
- Patrick Gale – A Perfectly Good Man

2012 – Autumn

- Elizabeth Noble -Between A Mother And Her Child
- Maria Duenas – The Seamstress
- Lisa Ballantyne – The Guilty One
- Ben Macintyre – Double Cross
- Eowyn Ivey – The Snow Child
- Hannah Richell – Secrets Of The Tides
- Adriana Trigiani – The Shoemaker's Wife
- Robert Goddard – Fault Line
- Helen Dunmore – The Greatcoat
- Anthony Horowitz – The House Of Silk

2013 – Spring

- Rachel Joyce -The Unlikely Pilgrimage of Harold Fry
- David Mark – Dark Winter
- John Green – The Fault in Our Stars
- Charity Norman – After The Fall
- Gillian Flynn – Gone Girl
- Chris Cleave – Gold
- Julia Gregson – Jasmine Nights
- Noah Hawley – The Good Father
- Grace McCleen – The Land Of Decoration
- Jennifer McVeigh – The Fever Tree

2013 – Summer

- Karen Walker – The Age Of Miracles
- Sophie McKenzie – close My Eyes
- Kathleen MacMahon – This Is How It Ends
- James Oswald – Natural Causes
- M. L. Stedman – The Light Between Oceans
- Joanna Rossiter – The Sea Change
- Gavin Extence – The Universe Versus Alex Woods
- Simon Mawer – The Girl Who Fell From The Sky
- Lucy Clarke – The Sea Sisters
- Liza Klaussman – Tigers In Red Weather

2013 – Autumn

- Lauren Beukes – The Shining Girls
- Maggie O'Farrell – Instructions For A Heatwave
- Deborah Moggach – Heartbreak Hotel
- Tim Weaver – Never Coming Back
- Tracy Chevalier – The Last Runaway
- Saskia Sarginson – The Twins
- Liane Moriarty – The Husband's Secret
- Nele Neuhaus – Snow White Must Die

2014 – Spring

- Jodi Picoult – The Storyteller
- Louise Doughty – Apple Tree Yard
- Sian Busby – A Commonplace Killing
- Graeme Simsion – The Rosie Project
- Koethi Zan – The Never List
- Curtis Sittenfeld – Sisterland
- Jo Baker – Longbourn
- Becky Masterman – Rage Against Dying

2014 – Summer

- Khaled Hosseini – And the Mountains Echoed
- Terry Hayes – I Am Pilgrim
- Robert Harris – An Officer and a Spy
- Helen Dunmore – The Lie
- M. J. Arlidge – Eeny Meeny
- Julie Cohen – Dear Thing
- Lucie Whitehouse – Before We Met
- Sinead Moriarty – Mad About You

2014 – Autumn

- Jane Shemilt – Daughter
- Claire North – The First Fifteen Lives of Harry August
- Daisy Goodwin – The Fortune Hunter
- Andy Weir – The Martian
- Sarah Hilary – Someone Else's Skin
- Rowan Coleman – The Memory Book
- Antonia Hodgson – The Devil in the Marshalsea
- Rick Stein – Under a Mackerel Sky

2015 – Spring

- Jessie Burton – The Miniaturist
- Claire Kendal – The Book of You
- Emma Healey – Elizabeth is Missing
- Tony Parsons – The Murder Bag
- Anna McPartlin – The Last Days of Rabbit Hayes
- Sheila Hancock – Miss Carter's War
- Charles Cumming – A Colder War
- Naomi Wood – Mrs. Hemingway

2015 – Summer

- David Nicholls – Us
- Joel Dicker – The Truth About The Harry Quebert Affair
- Linwood Barclay – No Safe House
- Fredrik Backman – A Man Called Ove
- Nick Hornby – Funny Girl
- Vanessa Lafaye – Summertime
- Clare Mackintosh – I Let You Go
- Carys Bray – A Song For Issy Bradley

2015 – Autumn

- Kate Mosse – The Taxidermist's Daughter
- Peter Swanson – The Kind Worth Killing
- Anne Tyler – A Spool of Blue Thread
- Dinah Jefferies – The Tea Planter's Wife
- S K Tremayne – The Ice Twins
- Lucie Brownlee – Life After You
- Catherine Chanter – The Well
- Joseph Kanon – Leaving Berlin

2016 – Spring

- Laura Barnett – The Versions of Us
- Rosamund Lupton – The Quality of Silence
- Ruth Ware – In a Dark, Dark Wood
- Mason Cross – The Samaritan
- Jenny Eclair – Moving
- Sarah Winman – A Year of Marvellous Ways
- Claire Fuller – Our Endless Numbered Days
- Debbie Howells – The Bones of You

2016 – Summer

- Paula Hawkins – The Girl on the Train
- John Grisham – Rogue Lawyer
- Dawn French – According to Yes
- Stuart Neville – Those We Left Behind
- William Boyd – Sweet Caress
- Lisa Jewell – The Girls
- Jackie Copleton – A Dictionary of Mutual Understanding
- Cathy Rentzenbrink – The Last Act of Love

2016 – Autumn

- Gregg Hurwitz – Orphan X
- Fiona Barton – The Widow
- Susie Steiner – Missing Presumed
- Paula McLain – Circling the Sun
- Sharon Guskin – The Forgetting Time
- Katarina Bivald – The Readers of Broken Wheel Recommend
- Christobel Kent – The Loving Husband
- Anna Hope – The Ballroom

2017 – Spring

- Jessie Burton – The Muse
- Samuel Bjork – I'm Travelling Alone
- Hollie Overton – Baby Doll
- Joanna Cannon – The Trouble with Goats and Sheep
- Bryony Gordon – Mad Girl
- Sabine Durant – Lie with Me
- Keith Stuart – A Boy Made of Blocks
- Liz Nugent – Lying in Wait

2017 – Summer

- Jodi Picoult – Small Great Things
- Shari Lapena – The Couple Next Door
- Maggie O'Farrell – This Must Be The Place
- Clare Mackintosh – I See You
- Robert Harris – Conclave
- Sarah Perry – The Essex Serpent
- Kate Eberlen – Miss You
- Tana French – The Trespasser

2017 – Autumn

- Ali Land - Good Me Bad Me
- Ruth Hogan - The Keeper of Lost Things
- Rachel Rhys - Dangerous Crossing
- Amy Engel - The Roanoke Girls
- Sandrone Dazieri - Kill the Father
- Fiona Neill - The Betrayals
- Victoria Hislop - Cartes Postales from Greece
- Stef Penney - Under a Pole Star

2018 – Spring

- Matt Haig – How to Stop Time
- John Boyne – The Heart's Invisible Furies
- Lisa Jewell – Then She Was Gone
- Jo Nesbø – The Thirst
- Fiona Barton – The Child
- Michelle Richmond – The Marriage Pact
- Cara Hunter – Close to Home
- Beth Underdown – The Witch Finder's Sister

2018 – Summer

- Elizabeth Day – The Party
- Julie Cohen – Together
- Susie Steiner – Persons Unknown
- Celeste Ng – Little Fires Everywhere
- Dinah Jefferies – The Sapphire Widow
- Harriet Evans – The Wildflowers
- Erin Kelly – He Said She Said
- Lee Child – The Midnight Line

2018 – Late Summer

- Leïla Slimani – Lullaby
- Joanna Cannon – Three Things About Elsie
- Greer Hendricks & Sarah Pekkanen – The Wife Between Us
- Catherine Isaac – You, Me, Everything
- David Baldacci – End Game
- Rachel Hore – Last Letter Home

2018 – Autumn

- Heather Morris – Tattooist of Auschwitz
- Amy Lloyd – The Innocent Wife
- Sarah Vaughan – Anatomy of a Scandal
- Tom Hanks – Uncommon Type: Some Stories
- Rhiannon Navin – Only Child
- Sarah Haywood – The Cactus

2019 – Winter

- Alex Reeve – The House on Half Moon Street
- AJ Pearce – Dear Mrs Bird
- Elizabeth Noble – Love, Iris
- Clare Mackintosh – Let Me Lie
- A. J. Finn – The Woman In The Window
- Sarah J. Harris – The Colour of Bee Larkham's Murder

2019 – Spring

- Kate Mosse – The Burning Chambers
- Linda Green – The Last Thing She Told Me
- Liane Moriarty – Nine Perfect Strangers
- Heidi Perks – Now You See Her
- Christina Dalcher – Vox
- Wendy Mitchell – Somebody I Used to Know

2019 – Summer

- Shari Lapena – An Unwanted Guest
- Michael Connelly – Dark Sacred Night
- Jane Harper – The Lost Man
- Elly Griffiths – The Stranger Diaries
- Catherine Steadman – Something in the Water
- Kat Gordon – An Unsuitable Woman

2019 – Late Summer

- Caitlin Moran – How to be Famous
- TM Logan – The Holiday
- Peter James – Absolute Proof
- Susan Lewis – One Minute Later
- Anstey Harris – The Truths and Triumphs of Grace Atherton
- Tony Kent – Marked For Death

2019 – Autumn

- Stacey Halls – The Familiars
- Oyinkan Braithwaite – My Sister, the Serial Killer
- Anthony Horowitz – The Sentence is Death
- Lucinda Riley – The Butterfly Room
- C.L.Taylor – Sleep
- Samantha Downing – My Lovely Wife

2020 – Winter

- Lisa Jewell – The Family Upstairs
- Alex Michaelides – The Silent Patient
- Alex North – The Whisper Man
- Harriet Tyce – Blood Orange
- Delia Owens – Where the Crawdads Sing
- Gytha Lodge – She Lies in Wait

2020 – Spring

- Mike Gayle – Half a World Away
- Christy Lefteri – The Beekeeper of Aleppo
- Tim Weaver – No One Home
- Sadie Jones – The Snakes
- Philippa Gregory – Tidelands
- Gilly Macmillan – The Nanny

2020 – Summer

- Robert Harris – The Second Sleep
- Jane Fallon – Queen Bee
- Erin Kelly – We Know You Know
- Dawn O'Porter – So Lucky
- Nicci French – The Lying Room
- Anna Hope – Expectation

2020 – Autumn

- Kate Riordan – The Heatwave
- Harlan Coben – The Boy From the Woods
- Jessie Burton – The Confession
- Jake Jones – Can You Hear Me
- Steve Cavanagh – Fifty Fifty
- Lara Prior – Rough Magic

2020 – October

- Hazel Prior - Away with the Penguins
- Sharon Bolton - Split
- Tayari Jones - Silver Sparrow
- Joseph O'Connor - Shadowplay
- Joanna Trollope - Mum and Dad
- Kathy Reichs - A Conspiracy of Bones

2020 – Winter

- Adele Parks - Just My Luck
- Sophie Hannah - Haven't They Grown
- Sam Lloyd - The Memory Wood
- Louise Candlish - The Other Passenger
- Peter Swanson - Rules for Perfect Murders
- Eve Chase - The Glass House

2021 – Spring

- Jeanine Cummins - American Dirt
- JP Delaney - Playing Nice
- Matt Haig - The Midnight Library
- Graham Moore - The Holdout
- Holly Miller - The Sight of You
- Stephanie Wrobel - The Recovery of Rose Gold

2021 – April

- Dawn French - Because of You
- Jo Nesbø - Kingdom
- Anthony Horowitz - Moonflower Murders
- Matson Taylor - The Miseducation of Evie Epworth
- Cara Hunter - The Whole Truth
- Emma Donoghue - The Pull of the Stars

2021 – Summer

- Robert Harris - V2
- Gillian McAllister - That Night
- Robinne Lee - The Idea of You
- Ellery Lloyd - People Like Her
- Michael Robotham - When She Was Good
- Kiran Millwood Hargrave - The Mercies

2021 – Autumn

- Rachel Hore - A Beautiful Spy
- Bernice McFaddon - Sugar
- C.J. Tudor - The Burning Girls
- Simon Scarrow - Blackout
- Jane Harper - The Survivors
- Catriona Ward - The Last House on Needless Street

2021 – Winter

- Lisa Jewell - The Night She Disappeared
- Karin Slaughter - False Witness
- Marianne Cronin - The One Hundred Years of Lenni and Margot
- Janet Skeslien Charles - The Paris Library
- Laura Dave - The Last Thing He Told Me
- Tana French - The Searcher

2022 – Spring

- Susan Lewis - I Have Something to Tell You
- Kristin Hannah - The Four Winds
- Jane Casey - The Killing Kind
- Ashley Audrain - Push
- Julietta Henderson - The Funny Thing About Norman Foreman
- L.V. Matthews - The Twins

2022 – April

- Taylor Jenkins Reid - Malibu Rising
- Shari Lapena - Not a Happy Family
- Harriet Evans - The Beloved Girls
- Miranda Cowley Heller - The Paper Palace
- Lizzy Barber - Out of Her Depth
- Kate Ruby - Tell Me Your Lies

2022 – Summer

- Liane Moriarty - Apples Never Fall
- Paula Hawkins - A Slow Fire Burning
- Ken Follett - Never
- Lucy Clarke - One of the Girls
- Rose Tremain - Lily
- Lexie Elliott - How to Kill Your Best Friend

== 2020 Richard & Judy: Keep Reading & Carry On ==
Richard & Judy returned to Channel 4 during the UK’s first COVID-19 lockdown in response to the rise in book sales. Over 5 consecutive evenings, starting on 4th May 2020 they fronted the series Richard & Judy: Keep Reading and Carry On. Guests included authors, celebrity guests & viewer’s children (in the Kid’s Review section) to discuss new releases & favourite reads.

Episode 01

- Book Review: Grown Ups by Marian Keyes
- Kids Review: You Wait Until I’m Older Than You by Michael Rosen
- Guest Author: Dear NHS: 100 Stories to Say Thank You by Adam Kay
- Top Three (celebrity book recommendations - Ant Middleton)
  - Of Mice & Men by John Steinbeck
  - The Art of Resilience by Ross Edgley
  - The Chimp Paradox by Prof. Steve Peters

Other books mentioned during this episode include: The Stand by Stephen King, This Is Going To Hurt by Adam Kay and The Fear Bubble: Harness Fear and Live Without Limits by Ant Middleton.

Episode 02

- Book Review: Me by Elton John
- Kids Review: The Lion Who Wanted to Love by Giles Andreae
- Guest Author: Home Stretch by Graham Norton
- Top Three (celebrity book recommendations - Leigh-Anne Pinnock)
  - 13 Things Mentally Strong People Don’t Do by Amy Morin
  - Why I'm No Longer Talking To White People About Race by Reni Eddo-Lodge
  - The Skin I'm In by Sharon G. Flake

Other books mentioned during this episode include: Behind The Mask by Tyson Fury, The Lady In Waiting: My Extraordinary Life in the Shadow of the Crown by Lady Anne Glenconner, War Doctor: Surgery on the Frontline by David Nott, So Me by Graham Norton, The Life and Loves of a He Devil by Graham Norton, Apeirogon by Colum McCann, The Other Side of the Bridge by Mary Lawson and Billy by Albert French.

Episode 03

- Book Review: Normal People by Sally Rooney
- Kids Review: Diary of a Wimpy Kid by Jeff Kinney
- Guest Author: Gotta Get Theroux This by Louis Theroux
- Top Three (celebrity book recommendations - Vogue Williams)
  - Yoga Babies by Fearne Cotton
  - Each Peach, Pear, Plum by Janet and Allan Ahlberg
  - Gringer The Whinger by Jane Landy
  - The Baby Sleep Solution by Lucy Wolfe
  - The Cows by Dawn O’Porter

Other books mentioned during this episode include: The Flatshare by Beth O'Leary, Daisy Jones & The Six by Taylor Jenkins Reid, Deep South by Paul Theroux, We Have Always Lived in the Castle by Shirley Jackson.

Episode 04

- Book Review: Blue Moon (Jack Reacher #24) by Lee Child
- Kids Review: Charlie Changes into a Chicken by Sarah Horne
- Guest Author: Slime by David Walliams
- Top Three (celebrity book recommendations - Bernardine Evaristo)
  - Black Rain Falling by Jacob Ross
  - The Mermaid of Black Conch by Monique Roffey
  - Rainbow Milk by Paul Mendez

Other books mentioned during this episode include: Buried by Lynda La Plante, The Inn by James Pattinson, The Chain by Adrian McKinty, The Boy In The Dress by David Walliams, Gangsta Granny by David Walliams, The Witches by Roald Dahl and Girl, Woman, Other by Bernardine Evaristo.

Episode 05

- Book Review: Rebecca by Daphne du Maurier
- Kids Review: Fantasticly Great Women Who Changed The World by Kate Pankhurst
- Guest Author: Hamnet by Maggie O'Farrell
- Top Three (celebrity book recommendations - Gyles Brandreth)
  - Oxford English Dictionary
  - Oxford Dictionary of Humorous Quotations by Gyles Brandreth
  - Dancing By The Light of The Moon: Over 250 poems to read, relish and recite by Gyles Brandreth

Other books mentioned during this episode include: The Testaments by Margaret Atwood, Bossypants by Tina Fey, I Made a Mistake by Jane Corry, The Ordinary Princess by M. M. Kaye and I Am, I Am, I Am: Seventeen Brushes With Death by Maggie O'Farrell.

== 2007 Children's Book Club ==
In 2007, Richard and Judy hosted a special Children's Book Club edition of the show as part of Channel 4's "Lost For Words" season. The featured books were chosen with the help of pupils from several schools around the UK.

5+ / Early

- Claire Freedman & Ben Cort – Aliens Love Underpants
- Sally Grindley & Lindsey Gardiner – Poppy and Max and the Fashion Show

7+ / Developing

- Andrew Cope – Spy Dog
- Betty G. Birney – The World According to Humphrey

9+ / Confident

- Mark Walden – H.I.V.E. Higher Institute of Villainous Education
- Derek Landy – Skulduggery Pleasant

12+ / Fluent

- Sophie McKenzie – Girl, Missing
- Robert Muchamore – CHERUB: The Recruit

== 2011 Children’s Book Club ==
In 2011, Richard & Judy relaunched the Children’s Book Club in conjunction with the BookTrust charity in an effort to get children reading & help parents choose books appropriate for their child’s literacy level.

Fluent

- Jo Nesbø - Doctor Proctor’s Fart Powder
- Janet Foxley - Muncle Trogg
- Cathy Brett - Scarlett Dedd
- Eva Ibbotson - The Ogre of Oglefort
- Elisabeth Beresford - The Wombles
- Scott Seegert - Vordak The Incomprehensible: How to Grow Up and Rule the World

Read by Yourself

- Alex T. Smith - Claude in the City
- Marcus Sedgwick - The Raven Mysteries: Flood and Fang
- Dominic Barker & Hannah Shaw - Max & Molly’s Guide to Trouble: How to Catch a Criminal
- Tommy Donbavand - Scream Street: Heart of the Mummy
- Gwyneth Rees - The Magic Princess Dress
- Derek Keilty - Will Gallows & the Snake Bellied Troll

Reading Together

- Rex Stone - Dinosaur Cove: Attack of the Lizard King
- Francesca Simon & Tony Ross - Horrid Henry and the Football Fiend
- Annette & Nick Butterworth - Jake the Good Bad Dog
- Holly Webb - Molly’s Magic: The Witch’s Kitten
- Margaret Ryan - Roodica the Rude & The Famous Flea Trick
- Laura Owen & Korky Paul - Winnie Goes Batty

== New Writers Book Club ==
Launched in October 2008, the club "highlights 12 debut writers over the course of a year".

2008

- Oct: Hillary Jordan – Mudbound
- Nov: Farahad Zama – The Marriage Bureau for Rich People
- Dec: Nancy Horan – Loving Frank

2009

- Jan: Jennie Rooney – Inside the Whale
- Feb: Melissa Benn – One of Us
- Mar: Tom Rob Smith – Child 44
