= Waverton Good Read Award =

The Waverton Good Read Award was founded in 2003 by villagers in Waverton, Chester, England, and is based on Le Prix de la Cadière d'Azur, a literary prize awarded by a Provençal village. Adult debut novels written by UK residents and published in the previous twelve months are eligible for consideration and are read by villagers. "The aim was not only to stimulate reading in the village but to provide encouragement to British writers". Two of the main founders were Gwen Goodhew (born 21 October 1942) an educational specialist who established Wirral Able Child Centre and has written and edited books on teaching the gifted child, and Wendy Smedley. It is the first British award to be judged by normal readers rather than literary figures.

Waverton Good Read Children's Award was first presented in 2011, for children's literature.

Due to the COVID pandemic, the 2019/20 shortlist and winner were announced on the same day, and there was no Children's award.

== Winners and shortlists ==
Year	Winner	Shortlisted
2003/4	The Curious Incident of the Dog in the Night-Time, by Mark Haddon	Astonishing Splashes of Colour, by Clare Morrall; Brick Lane, by Monica Ali; Dissolution, by C. J. Sansom; Spit Against the Wind, by Anna Smith
2004/5	Boy A, by Jonathan Trigell	At Risk, by Stella Rimington; Betrayal in Naples, by Neil Griffiths; Perception of Death, by Louise Anderson; The Two Pound Tram, by William Newton
2005/6	A Short History of Tractors in Ukrainian, by Marina Lewycka	The Family Tree, by Carole Cadwalladr; Emotional Geology, by Linda Gillard; The Water Horse, by Julia Gregson; This Thing of Darkness, by Harry Thompson
2006/7	The Killing Jar, by Nicola Monaghan	Gang of Four, by Liz Byrski; Where They Were Missed, by Lucy Caldwell; The Observations, by Jane Harris; Mr. Clarinet, by Nick Stone
2007/8	Salmon Fishing in the Yemen, by Paul Torday	Gifted, by Nikita Lalwani; In the Woods by Tana French; Mosquito by Roma Tearne; The Dead of Summer by Camilla Way; The Solitude of Thomas Cave by Georgina Harding
2008/9	Child 44 by Tom Rob Smith	A Girl Made of Dust, by Natalie Abi-Ezi; The Outcast by Sadie Jones; Spider by Michael Morley
2009/10	The Ghosts of Eden by Andrew Sharp	Girl in a Blue Dress, by Gaynor Arnold; The Coroner by M R Hall; The Street Philosopher by Matthew Pamplin; The Rescue Man by Anthony Quinn
2010/11	Major Pettigrew's Last Stand by Helen Simonson	Grace Williams Says it Loud by Emma Henderson; The Breaking of Eggs by Jim Powell; The Return of Captain John Emmett by Elizabeth Speller; Luke and Jon by Robert Williams
2011/12	Tiny Sunbirds Far Away by Christie Watson	A Cupboard Full of Coats by Yvvette Edwards; Into the Darkest Corner by Elizabeth Haynes; 22 Britannia Road by Amanda Hodgkinson; Sister by Rosamund Lupton; Snowdrops by A D Miller
2012/13	The Unlikely Pilgrimage of Harold Fry by Rachel Joyce	Tell the Wolves I'm Home by Carol Rifka Brunt; Rhumba by Elaine Proctor; The Bellwether Revivals by Benjamin Wood; The House on Paradise Street by Sofka Zinovieff
2013/14	The Universe Versus Alex Woods by Gavin Extence	Just What Kind of Mother Are You? by Paula Daly; The Shock of the Fall by Nathan Filer; What the River Washed Away by Muriel M Macleod; The Rosie Project by Graeme Simsion
2014/15	If I Should Die by Matthew Frank	A Song for Issy Bradley by Carys Bray; Wake by Anna Hope; Daughter by Jane Shemilt; After Before by Jemma Wayne
2015/16	The Death's Head Chess Club by John Donoghue	Letters to the Lost by Iona Grey; I Let You Go by Clare Mackintosh; Burnt Paper Sky by Gilly Macmillan; The Improbability of Love by Hannah Rothschild
2016/17	Anatomy of a Soldier by Harry Parker	Crisis by Frank Gardner; The Words in My Hand by Guinevere Glasfurd; Belonging by Umi Sinha; The People We Were Before by Annabelle Thorpe
2017/18	Eleanor Oliphant Is Completely Fine by Gail Honeyman	Montpelier Parade by Karl Geary; Not Thomas by Sara Gethin; The Pinocchio Brief by Abi Silver; A Boy Made of Blocks by Keith Stuart
2018/19	White Chrysanthemum by Mary Lynn Bracht	White Chrysanthemum by Mary Lynn Bracht; Call of the Curlew by Elizabeth Brooks; Bitter by Francesca Jakobi; Killer Intent by Tony Kent; The Sealwoman's Gift by Sally Magnusson
2019/20	Island Song by Madeleine Bunting	Sunfall by Jim Al-Khalili; Nightingale Point by Luan Goldie; Pieces of Me by Natalie Hart; She Lies in Wait by Gytha Lodge

== Waverton Good Read Children's Award ==
In 2011, the inaugural Waverton Good Read Children's Award was presented.

Winners

- 2011 Stephanie Burgis, A Most Improper Magick
- 2012 Caroline Green, Dark Ride
- 2013 L A Jones, The Nightmare Factory
- 2014 Erika McGann, The Demon Notebook
- 2015 Simon Mayle, Shoutykid - How Harry Riddles Made a Mega-amazing Zombie Movie
- 2016 Kerr Thomson, The Sound of Whales
- 2017/18 Katie Smith, The Pumpkin Project
- 2018/19 Andrew Clover, Rory Branagan, Detective
