= Tideline (disambiguation) =

Tideline in oceanography is where two currents in the ocean converge.

Tideline or Tidelines may also refer to:

- Tideline (novel), a 2012 novel by Penny Hancock
- Tideline (film), a Canadian-French drama film
- "Tideline" (short story), a short story by Elizabeth Bear
- Tide Lines, a Scottish folk band featuring music from Scottish West Highlands and Islands
- Tideline Ocean Resort & Spa in Palm Beach, Florida, a luxury Kimpton Hotel, formerly named Omphoy Ocean Resort

== See also ==
- Tide-Line Blue, a Japanese anime series
