= Natasha Solomons =

British author (born 1980)

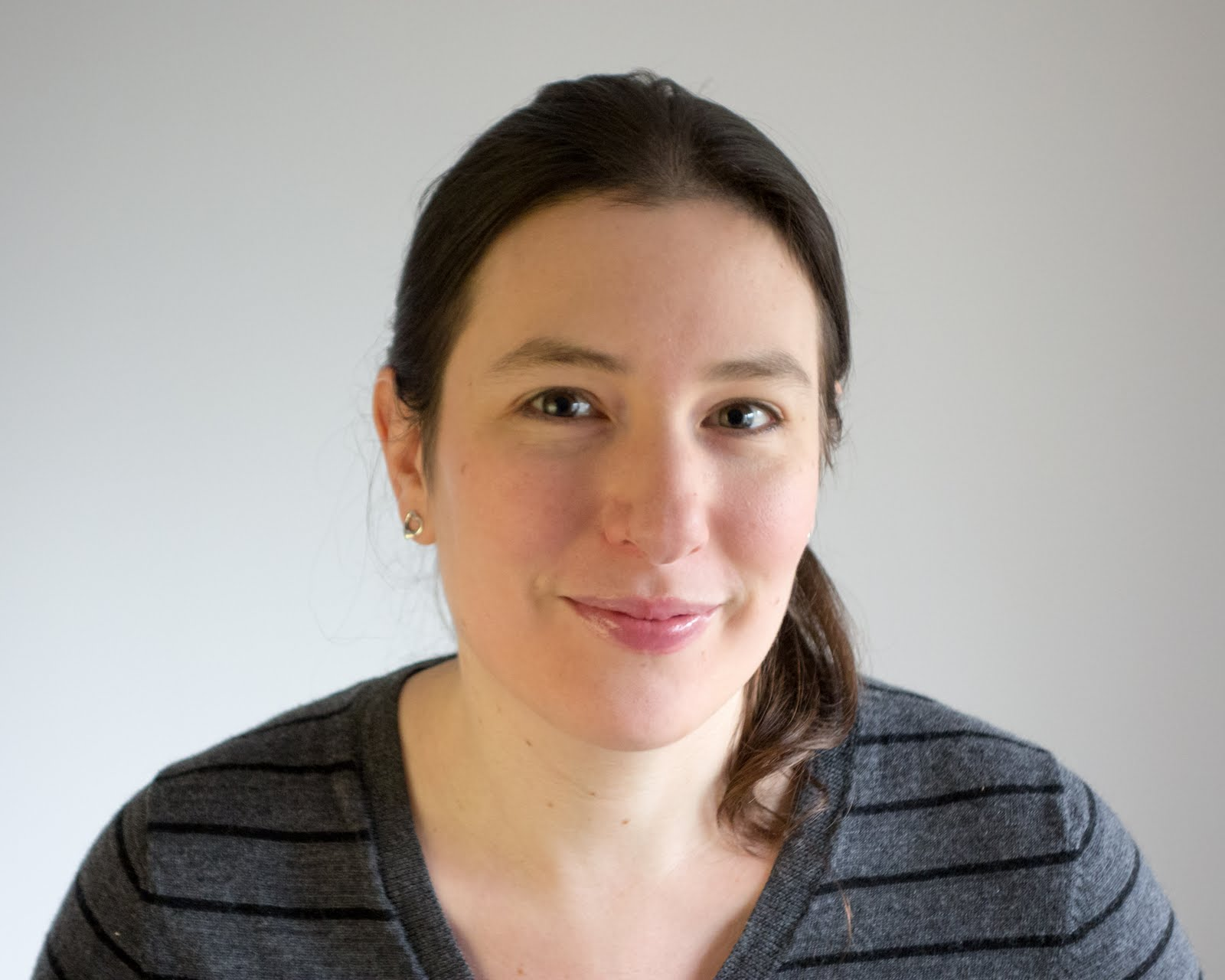
- Solomons in 2019
- Born: 1980 (age 45–46); South London
- Occupations: Author; Screenwriter
- Spouse: ex- husband is David Solomons
- Website: natashasolomons.com

Natasha Solomons (born 1980) is a British author. Her novels include House of Gold, The Gallery of Vanished Husbands, The House at Tyneford (also known as The Novel in the Viola), The Song Collector, Song of Hartgrove Hall and Mr Rosenblum's List. Solomons has won awards for her novels, including several for The House at Tyneford and The Song of Hartgrove Hall. Her work has been translated into seventeen languages.

== Life ==
She was born Natasha Carsley in South London and raised in North Dorset to a secular Jewish mother and a non-Jewish father. Her maternal grandparents fled Berlin and Austria in the late 1930s, arriving first in London and then settling in the Blackmore Vale, Dorset.

Solomons was educated at Eltham College. She holds an MPhil in English literature from the University of Glasgow and a PhD in eighteenth-century fiction from the University of Aberdeen. She lives in Dorset, England, with children and a needy golden retriever.

== Career ==
Her debut novel, Mr Rosenblum's List drew extensively from their experiences. Solomons has described the novel as "a scrapbook of her memories". She was particularly close to her grandfather. Solomons is dyslexic and struggled at school with her handwriting, but had ambitions to be a writer even when she was quite young. When she told her grandfather she wanted to be a writer, he took her absolutely seriously. He left her his writing desk in his will. As Solomons related in an interview in 2010:

"When he died I was 20 but he left a message in his will that he'd written when I was only 10 and in it he said: 'I leave to my granddaughter, Natasha, my antique writing desk to help with her ambition of becoming a writer.' I love it that while everyone else was thinking, 'When's she going to learn to read properly?' my grandfather thought, 'She said she's going to be a writer. She's going to be a writer.' So of course I wrote Mr Rosenblum at his desk."

In 2009, Sceptre Books UK announced a deal for a six-figure sum with Solomons for her first two novels: Mr Rosenblum's List, for which she was shortlisted for the 2010 Galaxy National Book Awards New Writer award, and (at the time unnamed) The House at Tyneford (alternative title: The Novel in the Viola). In 2011, The Novel in the Viola was included in Richard and Judy's Summer Reads. In 2012, The House at Tyneford debuted at number 29 on The New York Times' bestselling authors list. The TV rights for her novel, House of Gold, were acquired by Tall Stories Pictures in 2018.

She has written articles for national newspapers such as The Telegraph and Evening Standard. She works with her husband, David Solomons, as a screenwriter.

In 2019, her unpublished short story, "Curtis Butterworth Loves Molly May" was adapted as a stage play by Tim Laycock and Emma Hill. It debuted in Dorchester, Dorset in October 2019.

== Bibliography ==
=== Novels ===
- 2010 - Mr. Rosenblum's List / Mr. Rosenblum Dreams in English
- 2011 - The Novel in the Viola / The House at Tyneford
- 2013 - The Gallery of Vanished Husbands
- 2015 - The Song Collector / The Song of Hartgrove Hall
- 2018 - House of Gold
- 2022 - I, Mona Lisa
- 2023 - Fair Rosaline
- 2025 - I Am Cleopatra

=== Plays ===
- 2019 Curtis Butterworth Loves Molly May
