= Gregory Heath =

British poet, short story writer and novelist

Gregory Heath is a British poet, short story writer and novelist. Born in a Derbyshire hamlet, Woodhouses, in 1967, he is the author of the novels The Entire Animal, published by The Waywiser Press, and Thoughts of Maria, published by Open Books. He is widely published in the small press, his poetry, short stories and essays having appeared in magazines such as Aesthetica, Anon, Litro and Popshot. Staple have published him on a number of occasions and featured him in their Alt-gen collection showcasing the best small press writers of the previous decade.

He has been described as, "a gentle word-smith, who beautifully conveys complex emotions". Like much of his work, his novel The Entire Animal takes the reader inside the mind of someone for whom communication with others is not easy and we experience the awkwardness and effects of this shortcoming. Laurence Phelan wrote in The Independent that the novel is about, "a man at last coming to terms with the loss of his mother at an impressionable age, and belatedly learning how to let other people into his life and form meaningful relationships with them." More precisely it is about Michael, a highly regarded taxidermist, whose personal life is at a standstill. With a string of failed relationships behind him, he dedicates his days to work and his nights to alcohol. When love arrives in the shape of a beautiful young art student, he needs someone to confide in. But the only person he can talk to is the mother he lost as a child, until an unexpected friend challenges him to face his demons. Phelan goes on to praise the book as being, "stuffed with memories, emotion and desire."

Virginia Allen, in The Bloomsbury Review, wrote, "The Entire Animal tells Michael's story without a word to spare. So vacuum-packed is his world that it occurred to me early that if I started to talk about it, its essence would leak out... Long before the end, though, I stopped thinking about myself. I had no trouble becoming involved in the history of Woodington, Derbyshire, the life cycle of the hornet as thoughtfully observed by a man who has put away far too many beers, and the redolence of his pain."

Heath's novel Thoughts of Maria continues many of the themes of The Entire Animal, but also touches on wider issues such as drugs, arranged marriages and sexual obsession. Amazon reader reviews of Thoughts of Maria have been overwhelmingly positive, and the popular children's author Andrew Cope has described it as, "a superb novel". Goodreads reviews have been largely positive, too, though some readers have criticised it for its abrupt ending.

Heath has also published The Boy and His Animals, a book of 26 short poems, using the Lulu self-publishing process. The collection is dedicated to the memory of Stevie Smith, an English poet who once wrote, "I'll have your heart, if not by gift by knife..." The poems deal with psychological themes in a very unusual way. Reviews of the collection have been limited.
