= The Killing Jar =

The Killing Jar may refer to:

- "The Killing Jar," a 1986 episode of the Transformers animated series
- "The Killing Jar" (song), a song by Siouxsie & the Banshees
- The Killing Jar (novel), a novel by Nicola Monaghan
- The Killing Jar, a novel by David Docherty
- The Killing Jar (2010 film), a thriller film directed by Mark Young
- Killing jar, a device used by entomologists to kill captured insects
