= The Paris Wife =

2011 historical fiction novel by Paula McLain

- Author: Paula McLain
- Language: English
- Genre: Historical fiction
- Published: 2012
- Publisher: Ballantine Books
- Publication place: United States
- Media type: Print (paperback)
- Pages: 352
- ISBN: 978-0345521316

The Paris Wife is a 2011 historical fiction novel by Paula McLain which became a New York Times Bestseller. It is a fictionalized account of Ernest Hemingway's marriage to the first of his four wives, Hadley Richardson. McLain decided to write from Hadley's perspective after reading A Moveable Feast, Hemingway's 1964 posthumously published account of his early years in Paris. McLain researched their biographies, letters, and Hemingway's novels. Hemingway's 1926 novel The Sun Also Rises is dedicated to Hadley and their son.

== Plot ==
The Paris Wife focuses on the romance, marriage and divorce of Ernest Hemingway and his first wife Hadley Richardson, who met when Hemingway was 20 years old, and Richardson 28. They marry and move to Paris soon afterwards, where Hemingway befriends Ezra Pound, F. Scott Fitzgerald, Gertrude Stein, and James Joyce. Hadley sees the open marriages/relationships of her husband's friends, and suspects he is having an affair with Duff Twysden until his book The Sun Also Rises appears and then Hadley realises that their special relationship is because Duff is the spark that ignited Hemingway's first best seller. There are further strains as Hemingway pushes his satire on Sherwood Anderson which his wife's new friend Pauline Pfeiffer approves of—the marriage falls apart when Hemingway begins having an affair with Pauline Pfeiffer.

== Reception ==
The Paris Wife was popular with readers, and "shot to the top of the New York Times best-seller list soon after its release in 2011." Author Helen Simonson praised the book for "its depiction of two passionate, yet humanly-flawed people struggling against impossible odds—poverty, artistic fervor, destructive friendships—to cling on to each other". On the other hand, literary critic Janet Maslin criticized McLain's Richardson as "a stodgy bore".
