= Clare Mackintosh =

British author and former police officer

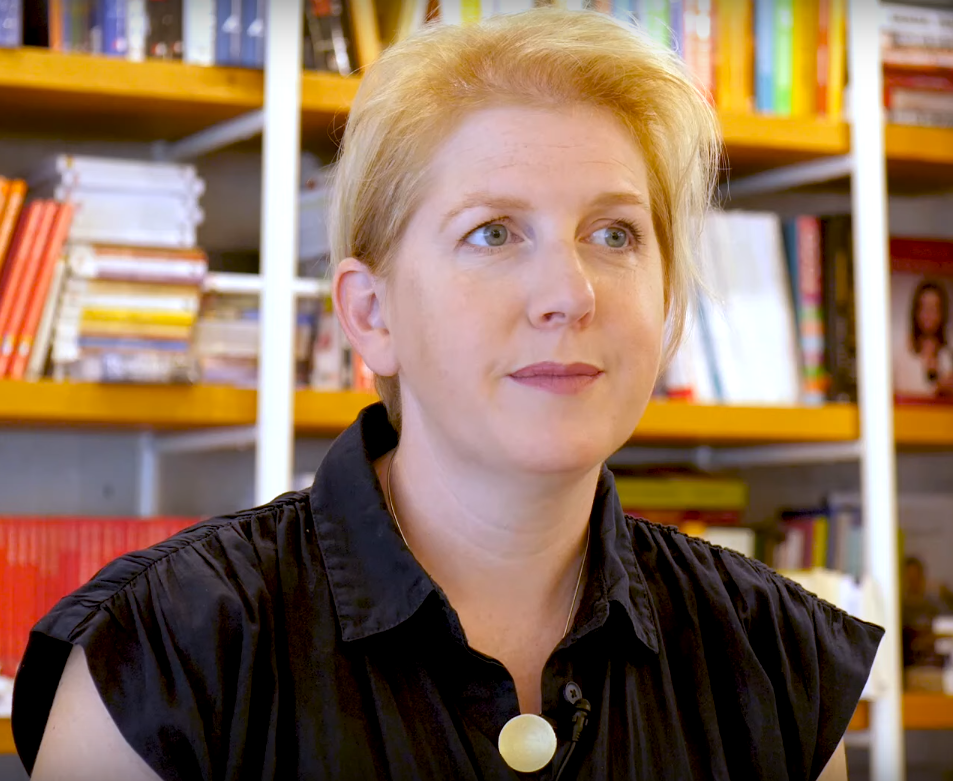
- Born: Bristol
- Education: Royal Holloway, University of London
- Occupation: Author
- Writing career
- Genre: Fiction
- Notable works: I Let You Go, I See You, Let Me Lie, After the End
- Notable awards: Theakston's Old Peculier Crime Novel of the Year 2016, Cognac Prix du Polar Best International Novel
- Website: claremackintosh.com

Clare Mackintosh is a British author and former police officer.

== Early life and education ==
Mackintosh went to Royal Holloway University in Surrey, taking a degree in French and Management, and spent a year in Paris as part of the course, working as a bilingual secretary.

== Police career ==
Mackintosh joined the police force upon graduation. She was posted on promotion to Chipping Norton as town sergeant before becoming Thames Valley Police's operations inspector for Oxfordshire. Mackintosh spent 12 years in the police force before leaving in 2011 to become a full-time writer.

== Novels ==
Mackintosh's debut novel I Let You Go, published in 2014, was a Richard & Judy Book Club pick. It won Theakston's Old Peculier Crime Novel of the Year Award in 2016, beating J K Rowling writing as Robert Galbraith. In October 2016, the French translation of I Let You Go (Te Laisser Partir) won "best international novel" at the Cognac Festival Prix du Polar awards.

Her second novel, I See You, was also a Richard & Judy Book Club pick, winning the readers' vote. It charted at number 1 in The Sunday Times original fiction list and was shortlisted for Crime & Thriller Book of the Year in the British Book Awards.

In March 2018 Mackintosh published her third novel, Let Me Lie, which charted at number 1 in The Sunday Times original fiction list. It was also chosen as a Richard & Judy Book Club pick.

As of May 2019 her novels were published in more than 40 languages and had sold more than two million copies worldwide.

Mackintosh's fourth novel, After the End, was published in hardback in June 2019 and became an instant Sunday Times bestseller. She then published three more Sunday Times bestsellers: Hostage, The Last Party and A Game of Lies.

== Other activities ==
Mackintosh was a judge of the First Novel category of the Costa Book Awards 2019.

In March 2024, Mackintosh published a memoir, I Promise it Won't Always Hurt Like This, inspired by her son's death in 2006.

== Personal life ==
In 2006, Mackintosh delivered twin boys prematurely. Her son Alex contracted meningitis and suffered significant brain damage, and was allowed to die naturally after spending some time in intensive care. When her surviving son was 15 months old, Mackintosh gave birth to a second set of twins.

As of 2022 Mackintosh lives in Bala, in north Wales. She credits the rural community in which she lives with the inspiration for her detective series, which features the Welsh-speaking DC Ffion Morgan.

== Charity work ==
Mackintosh is a founder and former trustee of the Chipping Norton Literary Festival. She is patron of the Silver Star Society, a charity supporting the John Radcliffe Hospital's work with families facing difficult pregnancies.

In January 2019 Mackintosh donated her advance for her book A Cotswold Family Life to the Silver Star Society, who used the donation to buy foetal monitoring equipment for the maternity unit.

== List of works ==
- I Let You Go (Sphere, 2014)
- I See You (Sphere, 2016)
- Let Me Lie (Sphere, 2018)
- A Cotswold Family Life (Sphere, 2019)
- After the End (Sphere, 2019)
- The Understudy (Hodder, 2019) (with Holly Brown, Sophie Hannah and B.A. Paris)
- The Donor (Sphere, 2020)
- Hostage (Sphere, 2021)
- The Last Party (Sphere, 2022)
- A Game of Lies (Sphere, 2023)
- Other People's Houses (Sphere, 2025)
