= Lexie Elliott =

Scottish mystery author

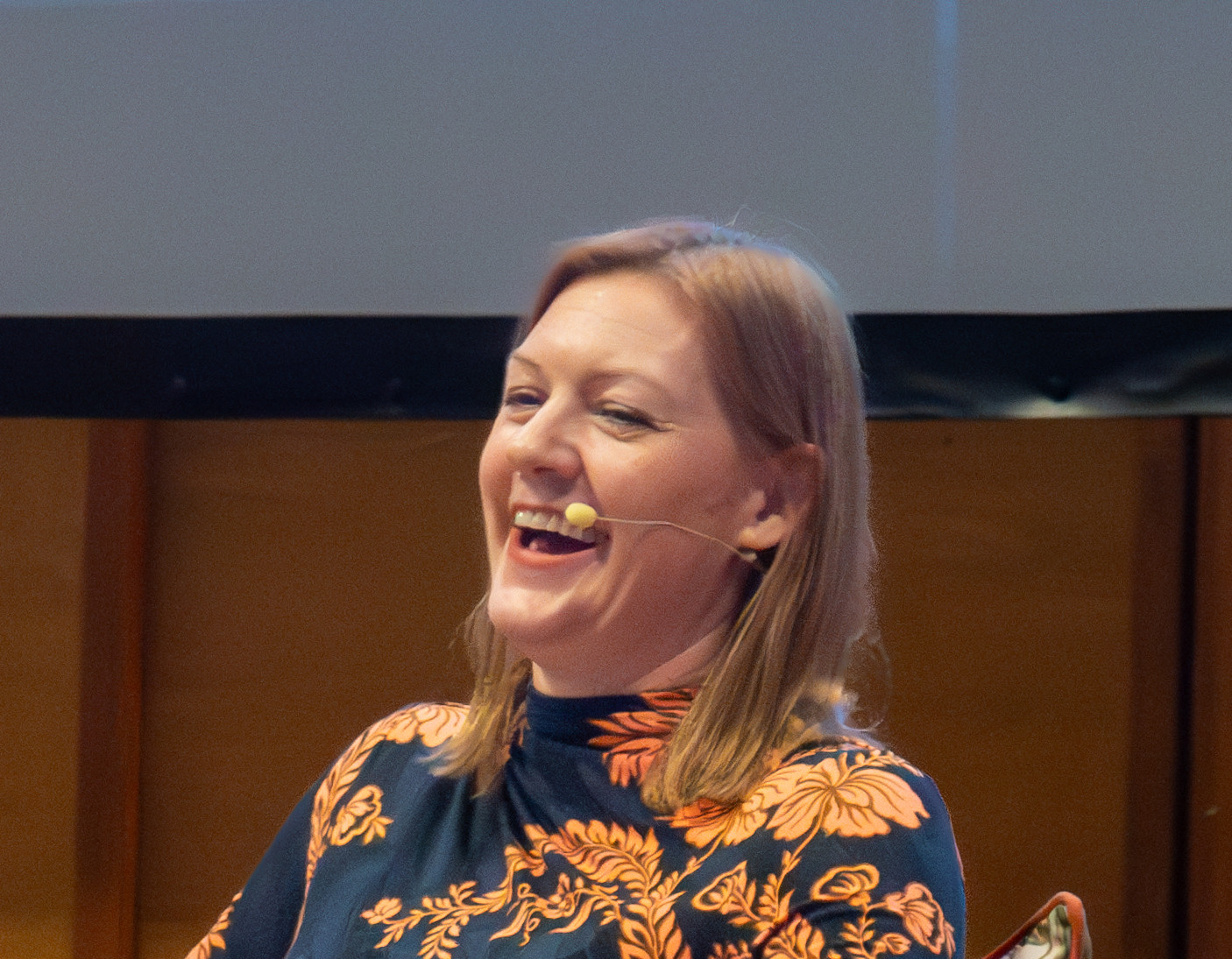
Lexie Elliott speaks at the 2024 St Andrew's Book Festival

Lexie Elliott is a Scottish mystery and thriller author whose books include The French Girl and How To Kill Your Best Friend, which was a Richard & Judy Book Club pick. She grew up in Braco, Perthshire.

== Biography ==
Elliott graduated from the University of Oxford with a doctorate in theoretical physics. After losing her banking job during the 2008 financial crisis, she started working on her first novel, The French Girl.

Elliott is a triathlete, marathoner, and open-water swimmer. She has represented Great Britain in the Europe Triathlon Multisport Championships. Elliott has swum the English Channel twice, in 2000 as part of a relay team and as a solo swim in 2007.

Elliott lives in London, England with her two children and her husband.

== Bibliography ==
Elliott's novels have been published by Berkley Books in the US, and Corvus in the UK.

- The French Girl (2018)
- The Missing Years (2019)
- How To Kill Your Best Friend (2021)
- Bright and Deadly Things (2023)
