= The Other Side of the Bridge =

2006 novel by Mary Lawson

- First edition (UK)
- Author: Mary Lawson
- Cover artist: Corbis Images
- Language: English
- Publisher: Chatto and Windus (UK); Knopf Canada (US)
- Publication date: 14 Sep 2006 (UK); 26 Sep 2006 (US)
- Publication place: Canada
- Media type: Print
- Pages: 288 (UK)
- ISBN: 0-7011-7327-0

The Other Side of the Bridge is the second novel by Canadian novelist Mary Lawson. It became a bestseller in Canada, and was longlisted for The Booker Prize.

== Plot summary ==
As with her first novel, Crow Lake, the setting is Northern Ontario. It is the mid 1930s and Arthur and Jake, the sons of a farmer vie for the affections of Laura, a newcomer to the community. A generation later, Ian the son of the local doctor becomes obsessed with Arthur's wife...

== Characters ==
=== Major characters ===
- Arthur Dunn: Protagonist for even-numbered chapters. Big, heavy, slow, sloping shoulders, neck like an ox, broad meaty feet. Doesn't like school, thinks it's useless. Gets rejected from going to war because of flat feet. Implied he dies in the epilogue. He falls in love with Laura and marries her and raises a child that is not his but his brother's.
- Jake Dunn: Wheat-colored hair, triangular face, Arthur's brother. Excels at school and women. Four years younger than Arthur. Falls off the bridge in Chapter 4. Has a permanent limp after.
- Ian Christopherson: Protagonist for odd-numbered chapters. Dr. Christopherson's son. Expected to be the next doctor. Has a perverted love for Laura, going as far as getting a job at Arthur's farm to get closer to her.
- Laura Dunn: Reverend March's daughter. Comes with him when he comes to take over for Reverend Gordon. Falls in love with Jake and gets pregnant with his child resulting in Arthur marrying her to avert her crisis.

=== Secondary characters ===
- Henry Dunn: Arthur and Jake's father. He dies when he drives the tractor into the ditch.
- Mrs. Dunn: Arthur and Jake's mother. Has had multiple miscarriages in the past leading to her overprotective nature of Jake.
- Dr. Christopherson: The town's only resident doctor.
- Beth Christopherson: Ian's mother and Dr. Christopherson's wife. She leaves Ian and Dr. Christopherson in Chapter 3 because she no longer loves Dr. Christopherson anymore. She moves to Toronto with Robert Patterson, Ian's teacher.
- Pete Corbiere: Ian's best friend, goes fishing with him.
- Mr. Corbiere: Pete's grandfather. Works at the reserve store down by the lake.
- Otto Luntz: Carl's Father
- Gertie Luntz: Carl's Mother
- Carl Luntz: Arthur's best friend. Has a collection of antlers. Goes to fight in the war and dies along with his brothers.
- Carter Dunn: Son of Laura Dunn and Jake. Gets run over by Jake in the last chapter.
- Cathy Barrett: Girlfriend of Ian Christopherson. Has a spat with Ian about his future.

== Settings ==
The story takes place in Struan, a small fictional town in Northern Ontario.

== Themes ==
There are multiple themes throughout the story. They include growing up, friendship, love, adultery, sibling rivalry, war, guilt, responsibility, choices in life, and farming.

== Reception ==
Reviews were positive :

- Penelope Lively in The Guardian wrote "Tragedy abounds in the novel, but such is its humanity and its wisdom that the effect is not dismaying, but somehow reassuring. Appalling things happen, and are done, but in the last resort ordinary decency somehow wins out. This is a fine book – an enthralling read, both straightforward and wonderfully intricate"
- Louise Doughty in The Independent finished with "Her Booker longlisting should be a source of joy for everyone tired of self-indulgent "look at me" writing. The Other Side of the Bridge is a beautiful read, on every level."
- Frances Taliaferro in The Washington Post wrote "The Other Side of the Bridge is an admirable novel. Its old-fashioned virtues were also apparent in Crow Lake – narrative clarity, emotional directness, moral context and lack of pretension – but Lawson has ripened as a writer, and this second novel is much broader and deeper. The author draws her characters with unobtrusive humor and compassion, and she meets one of the fiction writer's most difficult challenges: to portray goodness believably, without sugar or sentiment."

== Translations ==
- German: Auf der anderen Seite des Flusses. Transl. Sabine Lohmann. Heyne, Munich 2006
