= Nicola Monaghan =

English novelist and screenplay writer (living)

Nicola Monaghan Occupation: Novelist Genre: Fiction

Nicola Monaghan, (also known as Niki Valentine) is an English novelist and author of The Killing Jar, Starfishing and The Okinawa Dragon. She grew up in Nottingham, England, and gave up a career in finance to pursue an MA in creative writing at Nottingham Trent University.

== Writing career ==
Monaghan was listed in The Independent's New Year 2006 list of rising talent and won a Betty Trask Award, the Authors' Club Best First Novel Award and the Waverton Good Read Award for her debut. Her second novel Starfishing and novella The Okinawa Dragon came out in 2008. She has also had stories published in anthologies and magazines, including Sunday Night and Monday Morning (Five Leaves), Cool Brittania (Wachenbach) and online magazine Pulp.Net.

Monaghan has written screenplays for Council Child Productions, including Starcross and Margie's Garden.

Monaghan also writes under the pseudonym Niki Valentine. With this name, she has published the psychological horror novels The Haunted, Possessed and The Doll's House. She also taught under this name at the University of Nottingham on the BA (Hons) Creative and Professional Writing, before it was discontinued. She now offers online courses on various online platforms under the name Nicola Monaghan.

== The Killing Jar ==
Monaghan's first award-winning novel was The Killing Jar (2007), inspired by the lives she witnessed on the council estates where she grew up.

- The Written Nerd
- East London and West Essex Guardian
- The Observer
- Mslexia
- The Independent

== Starfishing ==
Monaghan's second novel was published by Chatto & Windus in March 2008. It is set in the City of London in the late 1990s and concerns Frankie Cavanagh, a LIFFE futures trader, working and playing hard and trying to keep up with the boys. She starts an affair with her boss, Tom, and the two go down a destructive route together. The book is dark, with gothic overtones, and some subtle references to Mary Shelley's Frankenstein. As with Monaghan's previous work, the imagery is rich and very sensual, and the narrative fast-paced. The story takes place as the financial world begins to be taken over by electronic trading on screens and traders struggle to cope with this transition.

== The Okinawa Dragon ==
Monaghan's third book is a novella published by Five Leaves Publications, also in 2008. Again written in a pacey, first-person voice, it tells the story of Jack, a card trader. He is the ultimate alpha male with high powered customers all over the world. One of Jack's richest clients wants to own a very rare trading card, The Okinawa Dragon, but it belongs to a Japanese businessman who is not prepared to sell. Jack travels to Japan to "acquire" the card.

== Bibliography ==
- The Killing Jar (2007)
- Starfishing (2010)
- The Okinawa Dragon (2010)
- The Haunted (2011) (as Niki Valentine)
- Possessed (2012) (as Niki Valentine)
- The Doll's House (2012) (as Niki Valentine)
- The Night Lingers and Other Stories (2015)
- The Troll: Book 1 (2015)
- The Troll: Book 2 (2015)
- The Troll: Book 3 (2015)
- Dead Flowers (2019)
- Wish You Were Here (2023)
