= Carol Rifka Brunt =

American writer (born 1970)

Carol Rifka Brunt (born 1970) is an American novelist and short fiction writer. She is the author of Tell The Wolves I'm Home, on the New York Times Best Seller list. She is currently working on her second book. She is a 2013 recipient of the Alex Awards.

== Early life ==
Brunt was born in Queens, New York City, in 1970. She grew up in Pleasantville, New York, near the setting of her book Tell the Wolves I'm Home.

== Career ==
Brunt began her professional writing career in Amherst, Massachusetts. In addition to writing, she worked with elderly people and men who suffered brain damage.

Brunt wrote short stories published in several literary journals, including North American Review and The Sun. In 2006 she received the New Writing Ventures award from the New Writing Partnership and Arts Council England. Then in 2007 Brunt received an additional award from the Arts Council to write her first novel. Brunt has also been published in The Wall Street Journal.

== Tell The Wolves I'm Home ==
Brunt's novel Tell The Wolves I'm Home made it to The New York Times Best Seller list in July 2013. Her novel was first published by Dial Press in the United States and Macmillan in the United Kingdom in June 2012.

Tell The Wolves I'm Home started with the idea of a dying uncle painting a portrait of his nieces. Brunt shelved the idea until the character of June came to her along with the first chapter. "I knew there was so much more there, so I just kept adding."

The novel started as a piece of short fiction, most of which ended up in the first chapter of the book. Brunt set the novel in 1980s New York, when and where the author grew up. The book is, according to Brunt, a semi-autobiographical coming-of-age story. Brunt has stated that though she has a sister like the heroine of the book, the relationship is not based on her relationship with her sister. Brunt says the similarities are mostly bits of her own personality and childhood hobbies attributed to the characters of June and her older sister Greta.

However, Brunt did find small bits of her novel reflected in real life; a portrait by James Cowie called "Two Schoolgirls" Brunt says is almost exactly how she imagined the character of the uncle, Finn, painting his two nieces.

Brunt's debut novel was a critical success, making it on to Oprah Winfrey's summer reading list, and being named one of the best books of the year by The Wall Street Journal and O: The Oprah Magazine as well as receiving the Alex Award for realistic fiction in 2013.

== Personal life ==
Brunt left the United States to attend the University of St. Andrews in Fife, Scotland. She started with a major in English and Medieval History, but graduated with an MA in philosophy. There, she met her husband, with whom she now has three children. She had her first child while living in Massachusetts, and her second shortly after moving to Okanagan Valley, British Columbia in Canada. After briefly moving back to Massachusetts, Brunt and her family moved to their current home in Dartmoor, England, where her husband works as an astronomer.
