= The Silk Merchant's Daughter =

2016 novel by Dinah Jefferies

- Book cover of The Silk Merchant's Daughter
- Author: Dinah Jefferies
- Language: English
- Subject: Historical Fiction
- Publisher: Penguin Random House
- Publication date: February 25, 2016
- Publication place: England
- ISBN: 978-0-2412486-21

The Silk Merchant's Daughter is a novel published in 2016 by British author Dinah Jefferies. The book was published by Penguin Random House and made the Sunday Times Top 10 best-seller list.

== Plot ==
The Silk Merchant's Daughter is a historical novel set in French-occupied Vietnam (then French Indochina) in the early 1950s. It follows Nicole Duval, the half-French, half-Vietnamese daughter of a wealthy silk merchant, who has always lived in the shadow of her beautiful older sister, Sylvie. While Sylvie inherits control of the family's prosperous silk business, Nicole is left with a neglected shop in Hanoi's Vietnamese quarter. As she rebuilds the shop, she becomes increasingly connected to her Vietnamese heritage and witnesses firsthand the injustices of French colonial rule, forcing her to question the values of the privileged world in which she was raised.

As political tensions escalate toward open conflict, Nicole finds herself torn between two worlds. She becomes involved with two very different men: Mark, a mysterious American silk trader with hidden motives, and Tran, a passionate Vietnamese revolutionary fighting for independence. At the same time, long-buried family secrets, betrayals, and rivalries come to light, making it difficult for Nicole to know whom she can trust. Ultimately, the novel is a blend of historical fiction, romance, and family drama, exploring themes of identity, loyalty, colonialism, and the search for belonging against the backdrop of a country on the brink of revolution.

== Critical reception ==
The Silk Merchant's Daughter received generally positive reviews from critics, with particular praise for its atmospheric depiction of French Indochina and its historical setting. Reviewing the novel for the Historical Novel Society, Maggi de Rozario described it as "a convincing tale of love, jealousy, political corruption and a clash of cultures", praising Jefferies' evocative descriptions of colonial Vietnam and her portrayal of a country on the brink of war. While noting some inconsistencies in the characterization of the protagonist, Nicole, de Rozario concluded that the novel was "a fascinating and entertaining read".

The novel also attracted positive responses from readers and reviewers for its immersive sense of place and historical detail. The BookTrail praised Jefferies' vivid prose, calling the novel "rich in history as well as culture" and highlighting its exploration of identity, divided loyalties, and colonial Vietnam. The reviewer commended the author's ability to bring the setting to life and described the story as emotionally engaging and historically compelling.
