= Random Acts of Heroic Love =

2007 novel by Danny Scheinmann

- Cover of UK hardback (Doubleday imprint)
- Author: Danny Scheinmann
- Cover artist: Claire Ward (design) Getty and Corbis (images)
- Language: English
- Genre: Fiction: Romance; Family saga Tragedy; Adventure
- Publisher: Transworld
- Publication date: 2007
- Publication place: United Kingdom
- Media type: Print (hardback and paperback)
- Pages: 432
- ISBN: 978-0-552-77422-2
- OCLC: 181069022

Random Acts of Heroic Love (2007) is a semi-autobiographical debut novel by the author and actor Danny Scheinmann. It follows the parallel stories of two unconsciously connected men in two different time eras motivated by the memory of love: Moritz Daniecki, a young Austro-Hungarian soldier captured by the Russians during the First World War and sent to a POW camp in Siberia, who decides to escape in 1917 and walk thousands of miles for the sake of his childhood sweetheart Lotte; and Leo Deakin, who loses his beloved girlfriend Eleni in a bus crash in Ecuador in 1992, and in his despair embarks on his own journey of discovery and self-reconciliation.

The novel is based upon the true story of Scheinmann's grandfather Moshe, who too was an Austro-Hungarian soldier captured by the Russians, and undertook a three-year journey back to Europe to be reunited with his lover, also called Lotte. Leo's grief and bereavement of Eleni also reflect the author's personal experiences when he lost his late girlfriend Stella in a similar bus crash in South America in 1992.

The novel was nominated for the Galaxy British Book Awards in the 2008 reading list of the Richard and Judy Book Club. The author is also currently adapting the book for film.

== Plot ==
=== Characters ===
==== 1917 ====
- Moritz Daniecki is a young Jewish Pole born in 1896 in the village of Ulanów on the banks of River San, on the fringes of the great Austro-Hungarian Empire bordering Russia. He meets and falls in love with Lotte, but is subsequently conscripted into the army and fights on the Eastern Front in Galicia and the Carpathian Mountains before surrendering to the Russians in 1915 and being imprisoned in a prisoner of war camp in Sretensk, Siberia. Two years later he begins a hazardous escape journey back to Europe with former comrade Frantz Király, and returns to Europe in 1920 to claim Lotte's hand in marriage.

In the novel Moritz is an older man dying of consumption in his home in Berlin (which he caught on his travels and never recovered from) and is recounting his experiences on his deathbed to his son Fischel, whom we later discover to be Frank Deakin.

- Lotte Steinberg, the daughter of an affluent Jewish furrier in Ulanów, is Moritz Daniecki's lover. Her parents disapprove of her enduring affection for him however and attempt to arrange a marriage between her and a wealthy lawyer in Vienna whilst Moritz is away from home.
- Jerzy Ingwer is Moritz's best and childhood friend. They serve together in the Austro-Hungarian Army but Jerzy freezes to death during the Austrian winter campaign in the Carpathian Mountains.
- Frantz Király is a cynical, pessimistic and ever-complaining Hungarian in Moritz's unit whose selfish mannerisms lead to his capture along with Moritz by the Russian Army. Despite their differences however, the two form a grudging friendship and together the escape across the Siberian wilderness until Király's deteriorating condition means he decides to stay behind, in Irkutsk.

==== 1992 ====
- Leo Deakin is an English PhD zoology student at University College London. He was the boyfriend of the late Eleni, who died in a bus crush near Latacunga, Ecuador, which he blames on his own rash misjudgment. He is a rational, intense character; his loss drives him to depression, delusion and obsessive compulsive tendencies as well as comfort in the quirks of quantum physics. Ultimately he finds solace in his enduring friend and confidante, Hannah.
- Eleni was Leo's girlfriend of two years, whose preceding death initiates the emotional journey that Leo goes through during the book. They had met in Camden whilst Eleni was a fresher at UCL. Eleni was a compassionate and carefree character, shown by her work for Amnesty. She was Greek and from the island of Kithos; her parents Georgios and Alexandria are divorced.
- Frank Deakin is Leo's father. Orphaned at a young age, Frank is a reclusive, sensitive character whose childhood experiences have a profound effect upon him and his relationship with others. After the death of Eleni, watching the change in his son's personality prompts him to be more open about himself. Later we discover that he lived in Berlin as a child just before the Second World War and that he used to be called Fischel Daniecki. He was sent to England by his mother Lotte via the kindertransport and was bullied by his peers for being German. After the war, upon hearing that the rest of his family had been murdered in the Holocaust, he took on a new identity as an Englishman in an attempt to escape his traumatic past.
- Hannah Johnson is one of Leo's best friends. They met on their first day of university and gradually forged a dogged friendship. She is a lively character whose extroverted personality hides her own grief from the loss of her mother to cancer at the age of ten. Hannah stands by Leo during his mourning and remains supportive despite consequent problems and strains in their relationship. Later in the book she becomes an orphan when her father passes away, and her emotions are reciprocated by Leo's father Frank who went through a similar experience. In the end Leo and Hannah grow to love one another in respect of their personal bereavements.
- Roberto Panconesi is a young Italian man who works as a lecturer in the philosophy of physics. He is popular, especially with female students, and noted for his eccentric theories and individual teaching style. A liberal and open-minded character, his opinion and description of quantum physics awes and inspires the grieving Leo, who finds a way of seeing and understanding love and the world around him through Roberto's words. Roberto also suggests that Leo writes down anything remarkable and personally relevant to him in a notebook. The novel is interspersed with a collaboration of quotes, scribbles and images on love and life depicting this notebook.
