= Erin Kelly (author) =

British crime writer

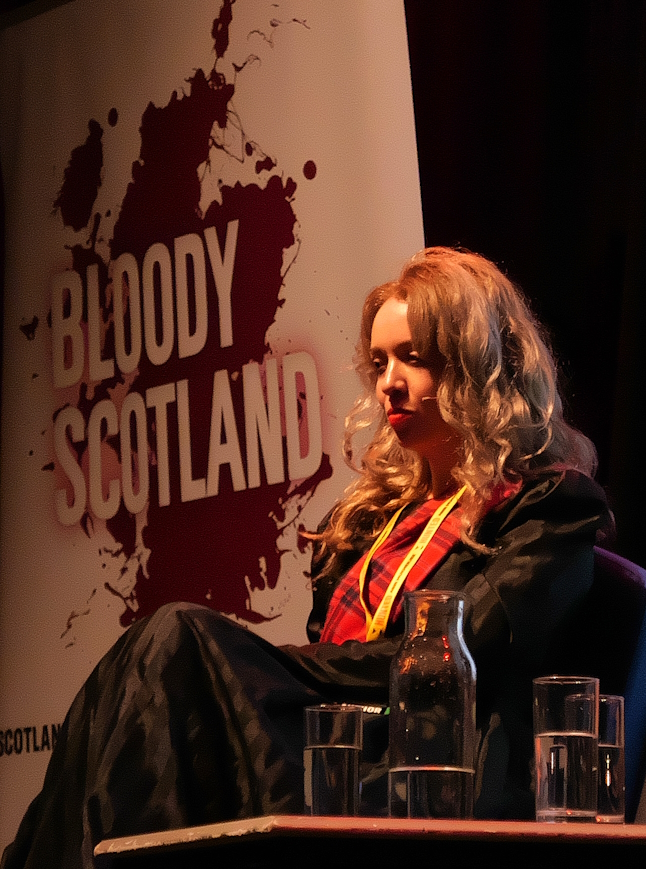
- Erin Kelly at Bloody Scotland 2024
- Born: 22 July 1976 (age 50); London, England
- Education: University of Warwick
- Occupations: Journalist and author
- Children: 2

Erin Kelly (born 1976) is an English writer from Romford. She has worked as a journalist since 1998, writing for newspapers, magazines including Red, Psychologies, Marie Claire and Elle, as well as writing psychological thrillers.

== Novels ==
Kelly's debut,The Poison Tree, was a Richard & Judy Book Club pick, and was turned into a major TV drama. Her sixth novel, He Said/She Said, spent six weeks in the Sunday Times top 10 bestseller list, and was also a Richard & Judy Book Club pick.

In 2014, Kelly's novelisation of the Bafta-winning TV programme Broadchurch became an international bestseller.

Her seventh novel, Stone Mothers, was later published under the title We Know You Know, and was selected as a Richard & Judy Book Club pick in 2020.

Kelly's eighth novel, Watch Her Fall, was published in 2021. Her ninth novel, The Skeleton Key, was published in 2022 and it included references to a song that was created by Ben Walker, Kirsty Merryn and violinist Basia Bartz to accompany the book. Kelly's latest novel, House of Mirrors, is a standalone sequel to her first, The Poison Tree.

Kelly also works as a creative writing tutor.

== Bibliography ==
- The Poison Tree (June 2010)
- The Sick Rose (June 2011)
- The Burning Air (January 2013)
- The Ties that Bind (May 2014)
- Broadchurch: The Novel (August 2014) inspired by the first season of 2013's mega-hit ITV series Broadchurch
- He Said/She Said (April 2017)
- Stone Mothers (April 2019)
  - Republished as We Know You Know (July 2020)
- Watch Her Fall (April 2021)
- The Skeleton Key (September 2022)
- House of Mirrors (April 2024)
