= Marianne Cronin =

English writer

- Born: Marianne Eve Cronin; 1990 (age 35–36)
- Education: Lancaster University; University of Birmingham
- Years active: 2019–present

Marianne Eve Cronin (born 1990) is a novelist and improv comedian. Her debut novel The One Hundred Years of Lenni and Margot (2021) received an Alex Award.

== Early life ==
Cronin was born to an Irish family and grew up in Kenilworth, Warwickshire. Her atheist parents enrolled her in Catholic school to appease her grandparents. Cronin studied at Lancaster University and completed a PhD in Applied Linguistics at the University of Birmingham.

== Career ==
Cronin wrote her debut novel during her MA and PhD. In 2019, Doubleday pre-empted the rights to the novel. Harper Perennial picked up the further rights, through which The One Hundred Years of Lenni and Margot was published in May 2021. Set in Glasgow, the novel follows an intergenerational friendship between the titular Lenni Petterson, a terminally ill 17-year old, and 83-year-old Margot Macrae James respectively. Anne Coates of The Arbuturian compared it to Emma Healey's Elizabeth is Missing. The One Hundred Years of Lenni and Margot made the Richard & Judy Book Club list and received an Alex Award. As of July 2023, the novel has sold over 320,000 copies. It was also reportedly picked up for an adaptation.

This was followed by Cronin's second novel Eddie Winston is Looking for Love in 2024, which she had begun writing in 2021. The novel follows an inter-generational friendship between a 90-year-old man Eddie who has never found love and a 24-year-old recent widow Bella. Eddie Winston is Looking for Love appeared the People best books list at the end of 2024.

== Bibliography ==
- The One Hundred Years of Lenni and Margot (2021)
- Eddie Winston is Looking for Love (2024)

== Accolades ==
Year	Award	Category	Title	Result	Ref
2022	Alex Award		The One Hundred Years of Lenni and Margot	Won	
2022	Best Book Forward Awards	Best Debut	The One Hundred Years of Lenni and Margot	Won	
