= Road Ends =

Novel by Mary Lawson

- First edition (Canada)
- Author: Mary Lawson
- Language: English
- Publisher: Knopf Canada; Chatto and Windus (UK)
- Publication date: 2013
- Publication place: Canada
- Media type: Print
- ISBN: 0-345-80808-8

Road Ends is the third novel by Canadian novelist Mary Lawson and set in Canadian Shield in Northern Ontario as are both her previous novels.

== Plot summary ==
Set in the late 1960s, the story revolves around three main characters: Edward, a banker, and two of his children: Megan and Tom. Megan Cartwright is 21 and has never left her family but then moves to London and discovers her full potential. Meanwhile, her older brother, Tom, struggles to process the suicide of his close friend. While reading his mother's old journals, Edward considers his difficult childhood and current troubles. Several characters from Crow Lake and The Other Side of the Bridge make minor appearances.

== Setting ==
The story takes place in Struan, a small fictional town set in Northern Ontario near Crow Lake, the setting for Lawson's first novel.

== Reception ==
- Mary Lawson’s story of a dysfunctional family in a northern Ontario logging town is told in scenes that are as palpably tender and surprising as they are quietly disturbing. Road Ends, her formidable third novel, uses the frozen landscape as a metaphor for the numb, spiritless lives her people shuffle through uneventfully, stuck in their circumstances. But there is a deeper drama that propels the book forward, and that sets up a vivid, evocative tale of rural and domestic angst laced with calamity.
