= Fiona Neill =

British author and journalist

- Born: Fiona Neill; Hackney, London, England
- Occupations: Author, Journalist and Columnist
- Writing career
- Genre: Women's Literature
- Notable work: Slummy Mummy
- Website: www.fionaneill.co.uk

Fiona Neill is a British author and journalist. She has written five Sunday Times bestsellers including Her last novel, The Betrayals which sold over 130,000 copies and was a Richard & Judy Book Club selection. She has worked as a foreign correspondent in Central America, was assistant editor for Marie Claire and The Times Magazine, and written for numerous publications including the Sunday Times and the Telegraph, as well as having written a screenplay of her first novel for the British Film Institute.

== Bibliography ==
| No | Title | Published |
|---|---|---|
| 1 | The Secret Life of a Slummy Mummy | 2007 |
| 2 | Friends, Lovers and Other Indiscretions | 2009 |
| 3 | What the Nanny Saw | 2012 |
| 4 | The Betrayals | 2018 |
| 5 | Beneath the Surface | 2019 |
