= Sharon G. Flake =

American children's writer (born 1955)

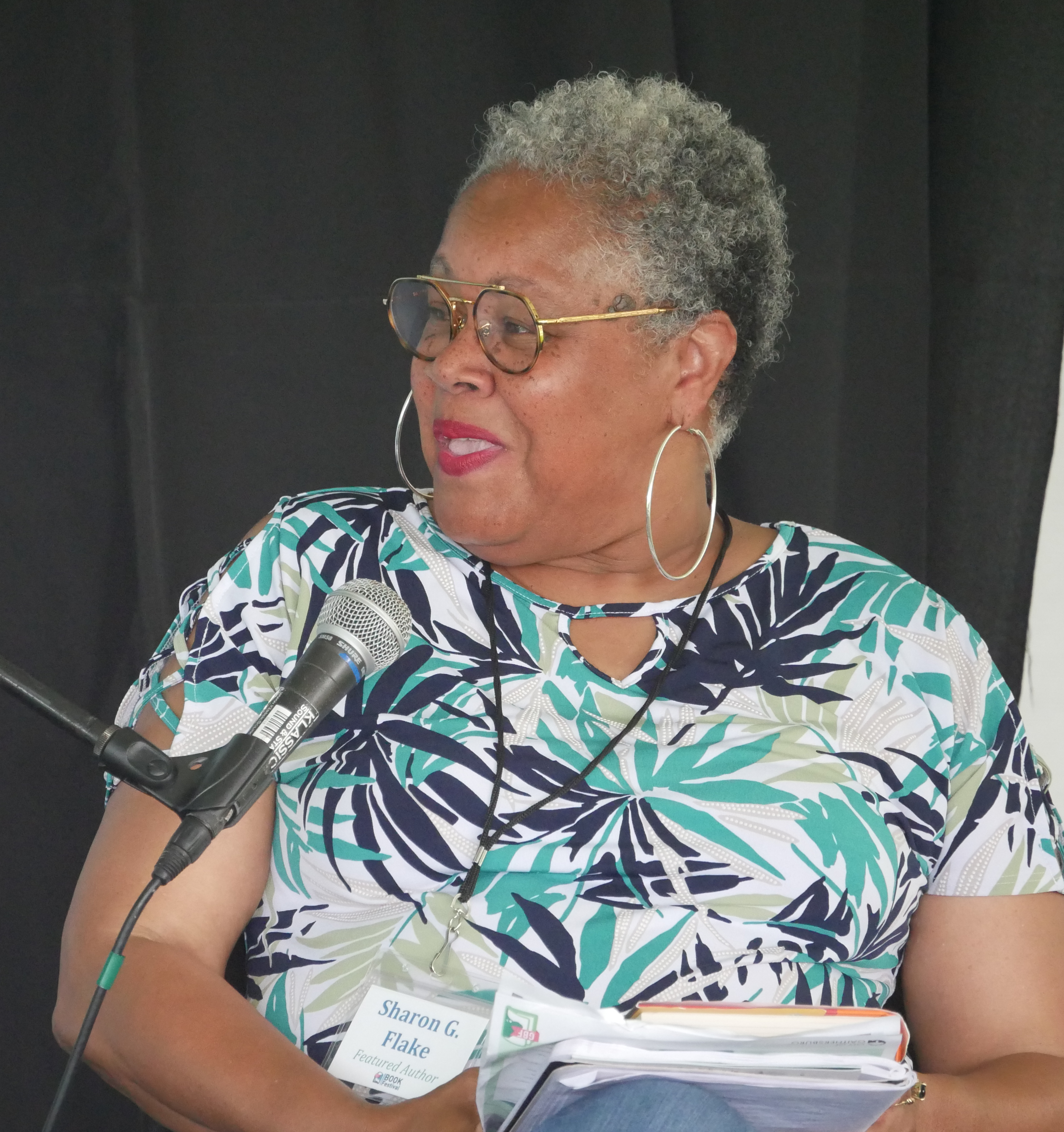
- at the 2026 Gaithersburg Book Festival
- Born: December 25, 1955 (age 70); Philadelphia, Pennsylvania, U.S.
- Education: Simon Gratz High School; University of Pittsburgh (BA)
- Occupation: Writer
- Children: 1
- Writing career
- Notable work: The Skin I'm In (1998)
- Notable awards: John Steptoe Award for New Talent (1999)

Sharon G. Flake (born December 25, 1955) is an American writer of children and young adult literature who lives in Pittsburgh, Pennsylvania.

Flake's debut novel, The Skin I'm In, was published in 1998. Her work has won numerous awards, including the John Steptoe Award for New Talent in 1999 for new authors, and has garnered positive feedback from Booklist and School Library Journal. She has also won two Coretta Scott King Honor Awards.

== Early life and education ==
Flake was born in Philadelphia. She is the second youngest child, with three brothers and two sisters, and grew up in an inner-city neighborhood. Her father worked for Philadelphia Gas Co., while her mother did days work and raised her children.

As a teenager, she attended Simon Gratz High School, where she was a member of the tennis team and the honor society. Flake earned her bachelor's degree from the University of Pittsburgh in 1978, majoring in English Writing and minoring in Political Science. During this time, she had an internship at the University's public relations office, and wrote for The Pitt News.

== Career ==
After graduating she took a job as a house parent in a Pittsburgh area youth shelter, then went on to work with young people in foster care.

From 1987 until 2005, Flake worked in the University of Pittsburgh public relations department, eventually becoming a supervisor, then Director of Public Relations at the University's Joseph M. Katz Graduate School of Business.

Flake continued to work at Pitt, while also writing nonfiction for local and national magazines. Periodically, she also wrote pieces for Pitt's alumni publication.

After her daughter Brittney was born, Flake began to write short stories for her daughter, and read them at her daughter's daycare. She wrote "The Luckiest Sister", a story about two twins who lead different lives because of their different skin colors. It was the winner of the August Wilson short story contest, published in AIM magazine.

Flake later won a scholarship to, and attended, the Highlights Foundation writing conference in Chautauqua. Her first novel, The Skin I'm In, was published in 1998 under the new Jump at the Sun imprint of Disney's, launched about September 1998 to produce "children's books with an African-American emphasis". In ten years she wrote six novels or story collections published by Jump at the Sun.

== Books ==
- The Skin I'm In (Jump at the Sun/Hyperion Books for Children, 1998)
- Money Hungry (Jump at the Sun, 2001)
- Begging for Change (Jump at the Sun, 2003) – sequel to Money Hungry
- Who Am I Without Him?: Short stories about Girls and the Boys in Their Lives (Jump at the Sun, 2004)
- Bang! (Jump at the Sun, 2005)
- The Broken Bike Boy and the Queen of 33rd Street (Jump at the Sun, 2007), illustrated by Colin Bootman
- You Don't Even Know Me: Stories and Poems About Boys (Jump at the Sun, 2010)
- Pinned (Scholastic Press, 2012)
- Unstoppable Octobia May (Scholastic Press, 2014)
- You Are Not a Cat (Boyds Mills Press, 2016)
- The Life I'm In (Scholastic Press, 2021)
- The Family I'm In(2025)
