= Farahad Zama =

- Born: Visakhapatnam
- Occupation: Author

Farahad Zama is a British IT director and novelist. He was born in Visakhapatnam (Vizag) on the Eastern coast of India in 1966. After studying in Kharagpur he moved to Mumbai to work for an investment bank. His career took him to New York, Zurich and Luxembourg and London. He lives in South London with his wife and two sons.

== Education ==
He gained a master's degree in Electrical Engineering from the Indian Institute of Technology at Kharagpur, near Kolkata.

== Critical acclaim ==
His first novel The Marriage Bureau for Rich People won the Melissa Nathan Award for Comedy Romance It was also Richard and Judy book of the month. It was short listed for Best Published Fiction at the Muslim Writers Awards, and he was shortlisted for Best New Writer of the Year at the British Book Awards.

== Books ==
- The Marriage Bureau for Rich People, Abacus (2 October 2008)
- The Many Conditions of Love, Abacus (1 July 2010)
- The Wedding Wallah, Abacus (28 April 2011)
- Mrs Ali's Road to Happiness, Abacus (3 May 2012)
