= Rachel Hore =

British fiction writer

- Born: 26 January 1960 (age 66); Surrey, England
- Occupation: Author
- Spouse: D. J. Taylor
- Children: 3
- Writing career
- Genres: Romantic fiction, fiction
- Website: rachelhore.co.uk

Rachel Hore (born 26 January 1960) is a British fiction writer, living in Norwich.

Hore was born in Surrey, England, and lived with her family in Hong Kong between the ages of five and eight before returning to England. After reading Modern History at St Catherine's College, Oxford, she worked as an editor at HarperCollins until she moved to Norfolk with her husband, the author D. J. Taylor, and three children.

She was in her mid-forties when she wrote her first novel. Aside from writing, she teaches creative writing and publishing at the University of East Anglia. She is the author of thirteen novels, several of which have been Sunday Times Top Ten bestsellers.

== Publications ==
- The Dream House (2006)
- The Memory Garden (2007)
- The Glasspainter's Daughter (2009), shortlisted for The Romantic Novelists' Association Novel of the Year 2010.
- A Place of Secrets (2010)
- A Gathering Storm (2011), shortlisted for The Romantic Novelists' Association Historical Novel of the Year, 2012.
- The Silent Tide (2013)
- A Week In Paris (2014)
- The House on Bellevue Gardens (2016)
- Last Letter Home (2018)
- The Love Child (2019)
- A Beautiful Spy (2021)
- One Moonlit Night (2023)
- The Hidden Years (2024)
