= The Killing Jar (novel) =

2006 debut novel of Nicola Monaghan

- First edition cover
- Author: Nicola Monaghan
- Publisher: Chatto and Windus
- Publication date: March 2006
- ISBN: 978-0-701-17983-0

The Killing Jar (Chatto and Windus) is the debut novel of English writer Nicola Monaghan, published in March 2006. It tells the story of Kerrie Ann Hill, a young girl growing up on a drug-ridden housing estate in Nottingham. Kerrie Ann meets an elderly neighbour when she's young, Mrs Ivanovich, an entomologist who teaches Kerrie about life, death, the Amazon rainforest and the miniature, alien world of insects. "Kez" struggles to look after her brother Jon, and hold things together as she's brought up by her junkie mum, Sue, and later, living with her boyfriend Mark as he becomes more and more involved with heroin and crack cocaine.

The book explores themes of metamorphosis, the highs and lows of drugs, and how people become trapped by poisoned environments, and what it takes to escape them.

The Killing Jar received starred reviews from Booklist, Kirkus Reviews, and Publishers Weekly. Monaghan was included in The Independent's New Year list of "Rising Talent of 2006" and The Killing Jar made their 50 Hot Books for summer and Books of Year features. It went on to win a Betty Trask Award The Authors' Club Best First Novel Award, and the Waverton Good Read Award.
