= Paula McLain =

American author

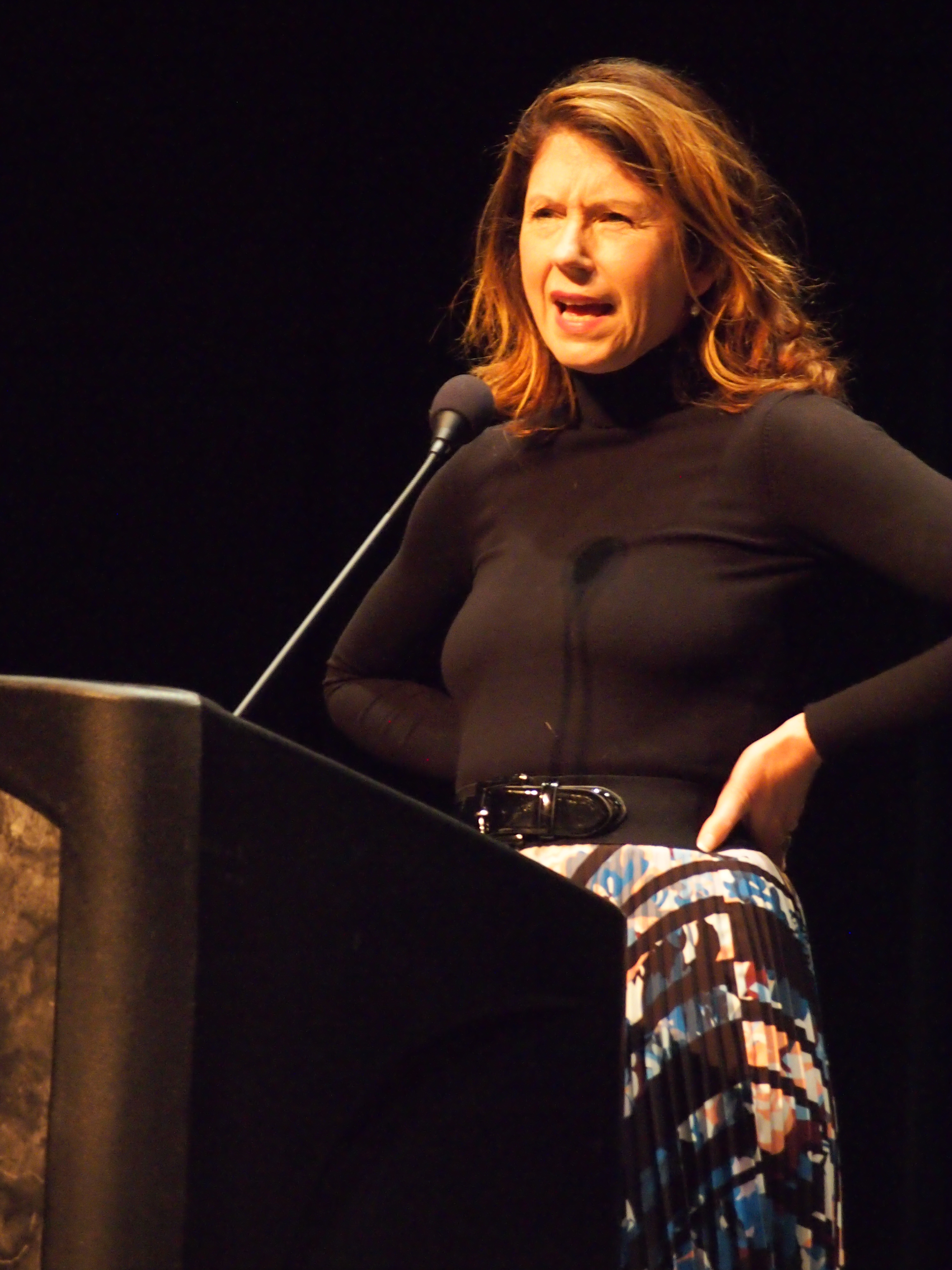
- Portrait of Paula McClain reading at Fall for the Book
- Born: 1965 (age 60–61); Fresno, California, U.S.
- Education: University of Michigan (MFA)
- Occupation: Novelist
- Writing career
- Genre: Literary fiction
- Notable work: The Paris Wife
- Website: www.randomhouse.com/rhpg/features/paula_mclain/

Paula McLain (born 1965) is an American author best known for her novel, The Paris Wife, a fictionalized account of Ernest Hemingway's first marriage which became a long-time New York Times bestseller. She has published two collections of poetry, a memoir about growing up in the foster system, and the novel A Ticket to Ride.

== Biography ==
McLain was born in 1965 in Fresno, California. Her mother vanished when she was four, and her father was in and out of jail, leaving McLain and her sisters (one older, one younger) moving in and out of various foster homes for the next fourteen years, an ordeal described "with a dispassionate grace that puts a human face, actually three human faces, on the alarming statistics" in her memoir, Like Family: Growing Up in Other People's Houses When she aged out of the system, she supported herself by working in various jobs before discovering she could write. She received an MFA in poetry from the University of Michigan and has been a resident of Yaddo and the MacDowell Colony as well as the recipient of fellowships from the Ohio Arts Council and the National Endowment for the Arts. She lives in Madison, Wisconsin with her family.

== Bibliography ==
=== Novels ===
- A Ticket to Ride (2008)
- The Paris Wife (2011)
- Circling the Sun (2015) (L'aviatrice en français)
- Love and Ruin (2018)
- When the Stars Go Dark (2021)
- Skylark (2026)

=== Nonfiction ===
- Like Family: Growing Up in Other People's Houses (2003)

=== Poetry ===
- Less of Her (1999, New Issues Poetry Press)
- Stumble, Gorgeous, (2005, New Issues Poetry Press)
