= Elizabeth Noble =

British novelist

Elizabeth Noble (born 22 December 1968) is the author of seven novels: The Reading Group, The Friendship Test (previously published as The Tenko Club), Alphabet Weekends, Things I Want My Daughters to Know, The Girl Next Door, The Way We Were and Between a Mother and Her Child, all of which have reached The Sunday Times Top 10 best sellers. Her novel The Reading Group reached number one.

== Early life and education ==
Elizabeth Noble was born in High Wycombe, Buckinghamshire to a banker father and a homemaker mother. She is the middle child of three siblings. She was raised and educated in Kent, Hampshire, Surrey and Toronto, Canada.

Noble attended Hurtwood House School in Surrey and St Edmund Hall, Oxford where she graduated in 1990 with a BA Hons in English Language and Literature.

After university, she worked in a number of publishing companies, including Hodder & Stoughton, Scholastic Books, Harper Collins, and Reed Books, predominantly as a marketing executive.

== Writing career ==
Noble's first novel, The Reading Group, was published in 2004, and went straight to number 1 in The Sunday Times bestsellers chart. Her subsequent novels The Friendship Test (previously published as The Tenko Club), Alphabet Weekends, Things I Want My Daughters to Know, The Girl Next Door, The Way We Were ('When You Were Mine'), Between a Mother and Her Child and "Letters to Iris" ("Love, Iris") have all made The Sunday Times Top 10 best sellers list. She took a 6 year break from writing, to focus on her children, and to spend a few years living with her family in New York City, and her latest novel, The Family Holiday, was released in 2020. Her novels are published worldwide, and widely translated. She also writes short stories, and has written articles for a number of newspapers and magazines.
