= Good News, Bad News (novel) =

- First edition (publ. Hodder & Stoughton)
- Author: David Wolstencroft
- Language: English
- Publication date: 2004

Good News, Bad News is a spy/espionage novel by British author David Wolstencroft. The novel was first published in 2004, and was Wolstencroft's first novel. It was published by BCA by arrangement with Hodder & Stoughton.

== Plot summary ==
The novel revolves around two men, Charlie Millar and George, both secret agents who are mistakenly placed together as employees in a photo kiosk at Oxford Circus. Neither man is aware of the other's real identity. Then a "Frame Thirteen" order comes through, instructing each to assassinate the other.

Charlie and George try at first to carry out the order. But in time they learn that the real problem lies with the organisation for which they both work. As the chase begins, the two men come to understand that things not what they seem, and out pour secrets that will rattle the foundations of the British Intelligence Service.
