= Tideline (novel) =

- Cover of the first edition
- Author: Penny Hancock
- Language: English
- Genre: Thriller fiction
- Set in: London
- Publisher: Simon & Schuster
- Publication date: 2012
- Publication place: United Kingdom
- Media type: Print (paperback)
- Pages: 340
- ISBN: 9780857206282
- Dewey Decimal: 823.92

Tideline is a 2012 suspense thriller by the British author Penny Hancock.

== Synopsis ==
The book is set in Greenwich, by the River Thames in London. The book details how the main character, Sonia, opens the door of her house to see a nephew of a family friend, Jez, and how she invites him in and decides she must keep him. The plot is intertwined in deep personal revelations about Sonia's past.

== Reception ==
The book was praised by S. J. Watson as "Brilliantly written and totally gripping...It's such a thrill to read a book as deliciously dark and richly evocative as Tideline. From the first page to its shocking finale it draws you into its world and won't let go". It was also praised by Marie Claire and Laura Wilson in The Guardian who described the book as a "creepy, well-written debut", praising the portrayal of Sonia but describing the portrayal of Jez as less successful. The book was also featured on the Richard & Judy bookclub.
