= Dinah Jefferies =

British writer (b. 1948)

- Born: 1948 (age 77–78); Malacca
- Occupation: Novelist

Dinah Mary Jefferies (born 1948) is a British novelist, and a short-story and article writer.

== Biography ==
Dinah Jefferies was born in Malacca, Malaya in 1948 and moved to England in 1956 at age eight after the country became independent. She studied at the Birmingham College of Art and later at the University of Ulster, where she graduated in English literature.

When her son Jamie was fourteen he was killed in an accident at school and the experience went to underpinning the emotional power of her writings including her debut 2013 work The Separation.

Her 2015 novel, The Tea Planter's Wife, was a choice for the Richard and Judy Book Club. and was in the Sunday Times best sellers list for 16 weeks continuously from September until Christmas 2015, topping it twice during that time. Her next novel in 2016 novel, The Silk Merchant's Daughter, also entered the Sunday Times top 10. She has been a bestseller in Italy with both The Tea Planter's Wife and her 2017 book Before the Rains. The Sapphire Widow was published in April 2018. It too was a Richard and Judy Book Club pick for Summer 2018 and it also entered The Sunday Times Top 10 bestsellers list within 3 days of publication, staying there for three weeks. Her next book, The Missing Sister, was published in March 2019, though the eBook and Audio books were published a few weeks earlier. The eBook reached no 1 on the Amazon Kindle charts and the paperback entered the UK top 10 best sellers at no 8 after just three days of sales. She reached 13 in the Italian charts with that book. Having mainly based her books in South/South-East Asia, her 2020 book, The Tuscan Contessa, is set in Tuscany, Italy, during WW2. It was published in Italy and in the UK in July 2020. Her books have been published in over 32 different languages. In September 2020 she changed publisher from Penguin Random House to HarperCollins UK, with a contract for a trilogy starting with Daughters of War, a story of three sisters in war torn Dordogne, France, during WW2. It was published on 16 September 2021, and went straight into the Sunday Times top 10 selling paperbacks after three days of sales, achieving the 5 in the chart. The second part of the trilogy, The Hidden Palace, was published in September 2022 and is set in England, France and Malta over the period 1923 to 1947. The third volume of the trilogy, Night Train to Marrakech, was published in September 2023 and became her third Richard and Judy Book Club pick. It entered the Sunday Times top[ 10 at number 10. The first of a new book series, The Greek House, was published in April 2025.

== Bibliography ==
- 2013 - The Separation
- 2015 – The Tea Planter's Wife
- 2016 – The Silk Merchant's Daughter
- 2017 – Before the Rains
- 2018 – The Sapphire Widow
- 2019 – The Missing Sister
- 2020 – The Tuscan Contessa
- 2021 – Daughters of War
- 2022 – The Hidden Palace
- 2023 – Night Train to Marrakech
- 2025 – The Greek House

=== Short stories ===
- "The Scent of Roses" (May 2014, published in The Sunday Express "S" magazine)
- "The Shadow in the Wind" (Sept 2015, published in The Sunday Express "S" magazine)
