= Mary Lawson (novelist) =

Canadian novelist

- Born: 1946 (age 79–80); Blackwell, Ontario, Canada
- Occupations: Psychologist, novelist
- Writing career
- Pen name: Mary Lawson

Mary Lawson (born 1946) is a Canadian novelist best known for her award-winning novel Crow Lake (2002), and her Booker Prize longlisted novels The Other Side of the Bridge and A Town Called Solace.

== Biography ==
Born in southwestern Ontario, she spent her childhood in Blackwell, Ontario, and is a distant relative of L. M. Montgomery, author of Anne of Green Gables. Her father worked as a research chemist. With a psychology degree in hand from McGill University, Lawson took a trip to Britain and ended up accepting a job as an industrial psychologist. She married a British psychologist, Richard Mobbs. Lawson spent her summers in the north, and the landscape inspired her to use Northern Ontario as her settings for both her novels. Lawson later admitted that Muskoka, where she spent her summers, "isn't and never was the North", but the area now called Cottage Country "felt like it" to people from the south. She has two grown-up sons and lives in Kingston upon Thames.

In a book review, T. F. Rigelhof of The Globe and Mail stated: "Within days you'll see people reading Crow Lake in odd places as they take quick breaks from the business of their lives. You'll also hear people say 'I stayed up all night reading this book by Mary Lawson. Mary Lawson, Mary Lawson. Remember the name."

Robert Fulford of the National Post wrote an article about Lawson describing her process towards becoming a novelist. After settling down, she wrote short fiction for women's magazines and then graduated to her first novel. Lawson was in her 50s when she wrote it, and spent years perfecting it. She decided she disliked her first novel and then spent five more years writing until Crow Lake was complete. It took her 3 more years to find a publisher.

On the National Post's Paperback Fiction Best-Sellers list in 2007, Lawson's second novel, The Other Side of the Bridge, took the number-one spot.

An article featuring Mary Lawson was published in the McGill News magazine by Neale Mcdevitt and Daniel Mccabe. After her first novel, the article describes Mary Lawson as surprised by her success: "I really didn't know what I had done right. I didn't know if I could do it again." Her first novel, Crow Lake, was published in 22 countries and landed her a guest appearance on The Today Show, and several positive reviews in The New York Times, The Guardian, and other publications. Her second novel, The Other Side of the Bridge, also did well. She received good reviews from The Independent, and the Toronto Star. This second novel held promise of being on Maclean's list of Canadian bestsellers.

A Town Called Solace was longlisted for the 2021 Booker Prize.

Her new novel, Solace in Winter, was published on 10 November, 2026. It was also selected for Oprah's Book Club. The novel is about a community that is affected by the arrival of a young American during the Vietnam War.

== Awards and recognition ==
Year	Work	Award	Category	Result	Ref
2002	Crow Lake	Books in Canada First Novel Award	—	Won	
2003	Crow Lake	Alex Award	—	Won	
2003	Crow Lake	McKitterick Prize	—	Won	
2005	Crow Lake	Evergreen Award	—	Won	
2006	The Other Side of the Bridge	Man Booker Prize	—	Longlisted	
2006	The Other Side of the Bridge	Rogers Writers' Trust Fiction Prize	—	Shortlisted	
2021	A Town Called Solace	Booker Prize	—	Longlisted	
2021	A Town Called Solace	Evergreen Award	—	Won	

== Bibliography ==
=== In English, published in Canada ===
- —— (2002). Crow Lake (hardcover 1st ed.). Knopf Canada. ISBN 9780676974799.
- —— (2006). The Other Side of the Bridge (hardcover 1st ed.). Knopf Canada. ISBN 9780676977462.
- —— (2013). Road Ends (hardcover 1st ed.). Knopf Canada. ISBN 9780345808080.
- —— (2021). A Town Called Solace (hardcover 1st ed.). Knopf Canada. ISBN 9780735281271.

=== In translation ===
- Crow Lake (2002)
  - in French: Cécile Arnaud transl., Le choix des Morrison. Belfond, Paris 2003
  - in German: Sabine Lohmann, Andreas Gressmann transl.: Rückkehr nach Crow Lake. Heyne, Munich 2002
- The Other Side of the Bridge (2006)
  - in French: Michèle Valencia transl., L'autre côté du pont. Belfond, Paris 2007
  - in German: Sabine Lohmann, transl.: Auf der anderen Seite des Flusses. Heyne, 2006
- Road Ends (2013)
  - in French: Michèle Valencia transl., Un hiver long et rude. Belfond, Paris 2014
- A Town Called Solace (2021)
  - in French: Valérie Bourgeois transl., Des âmes consolées. 10-18, Paris 2023
