= Crow Lake (novel) =

2002 novel by Mary Lawson

- First edition (Canada)
- Author: Mary Lawson
- Language: English
- Publisher: Knopf Canada; Dial Press (US); Chatto & Windus (UK)
- Publication date: 2002
- Publication place: Canada
- Media type: Print
- Pages: 293pp
- ISBN: 0-6769-7479-1

Crow Lake is a 2002 first novel written by Canadian author Mary Lawson. It won the Books in Canada First Novel Award in the same year and won the McKitterick Prize in 2003. It is set in a small farming community in Northern Ontario, the Crow Lake of the title, and centres on the Morrison family (Kate the narrator, her younger sister Bo and older brothers Matt and Luke) and the events following the death of their parents. Kate's childhood story of the first year after their parents' death is intertwined with the story of Kate as an adult, now a successful young academic and planning a future with her partner, Daniel, but haunted by the events of the past. In among the narratives are set cameos of rural life in Northern Ontario, and of the farming families of the region.

== Plot ==
The death of their parents, when Kate is 7 years old, Bo a toddler, and her brothers in their late teens, threatens the family with dispersal and seems to spell the end of their parents' dream that they should all have a college education. Luke, the oldest but not the most academic, gives up a place at a teachers college in order to look after the two youngest and allow Matt, academically brilliant and idolised by Kate, to complete his schooling and compete for university scholarships.

This sacrifice leads to much tension between the brothers. Both work intermittently for a neighbouring family, the Pyes, who for several generations have suffered from fierce conflicts between fathers and sons. In the final crisis, Matt, after winning his scholarships, discovers that he has made the meek and distressed daughter of the Pye household, Marie, pregnant; she also reveals that her father, Calvin Pye, has killed her brother, who was thought to have run away from home as several other Pye sons had done. Calvin Pye kills himself, and Matt has to give up his plans for education to marry Marie.

Kate sees the loss of Matt's potential academic career as a terrible sacrifice, and is unable to come to terms with Marie or Matt thereafter. The dénouement of the adult Kate's story comes when she returns to Crow Lake for Matt and Marie's son's eighteenth birthday, introducing Daniel to her family for the first time. In the course of this visit, she is made to realise - first by Marie and then by Daniel - that Matt's loss though real was not the total tragedy she had always considered it, and that it is her sense of it as tragic that has destroyed her relationship with him. The book ends with her struggling to come to terms with this view of their past and present relationships; the struggle is left unresolved but the final tone is optimistic.

The book is essentially a double Bildungsroman, in that the development of both Matt and Kate is charted; but whereas we see the key events in Matt's young adulthood more or less in sequence, the key events in Kate's are sketched in from both ends, towards a crisis that in terms of events is Matt's but psychologically is more significant for Kate. The mixture of perspectives involved in Kate's story allows the author to relate violent events and highly charged emotions in a smooth and elegant style, a quality for which the book has been widely praised by reviewers.

== Reception ==
Anna Shapiro praises the novel in The Observer as being assured and lucid: "full of blossoming insights and emotional acuity" concluding that "Turning points and consequences are outlined with unusual sharpness here, allowing the reader to dwell on painful might-have-beens as if they were one's own. At one point, Kate writes: 'That spring every form of life seemed bent on revealing its secrets to us', and it might be added that this is just what the book - a compelling and serious page-turner - does superlatively well."

Kirkus Reviews is also positive, saying that the novel is finely crafted, concluding that it is "A simple and heartfelt account that conveys an astonishing intensity of emotion, almost Proustian in its sense of loss and regret."

Janet Burroway writing in The New York Times writes that Lawson explores "class and class bigotry, sibling rivalry, the force of childhood experience in adult choice, the convoluted nature of guilt and the resilience of thwarted people who do good by making do...Mary Lawson handles both reflection and violence makes her a writer to read and to watch. Peripheral portraits are skillfully drawn." Burroway concludes that "Most impressive are the nuanced and un-self-conscious zoological metaphors that thread through the text: the snapping turtles whose shells are small so a lot of their skin is exposed. It makes them nervous; the male stickleback who supply oxygen for the eggs and guard the freshly hatched young. That Daniel is concerned with bacterial adaptation, while Kate researches surfactants that reduce the water's surface tension and the opposites-attract properties of the hydrogen bond, has a resonance at once witty and poignant. When Daniel's mother misinterprets the Wordsworth line the child is father of the man, there may ensue some querulous chitchat about the nature-nurture controversy, but the relevance to Kate's predicament is fine and clear: avoidance of her own history may amount to ingratitude, and even guilt can be a form of snobbery.

Publishers Weekly praises that Lawson: "delivers a potent combination of powerful character writing and gorgeous description of the land. Her sense of pace and timing is impeccable throughout, and she uses dangerous winter weather brilliantly to increase the tension as the family battles to survive. This is a vibrant, resonant novel by a talented writer whose lyrical, evocative writing invites comparisons to Rick Bass and Richard Ford. The combination of orphan protagonists and effortless prose makes this an irresistible first effort.
