= Tell The Wolves I'm Home =

Novel by Carol Rifka Brunt

- Author: Carol Rifka Brunt
- Language: English
- Publisher: Random House
- Publication date: June 1, 2012
- Pages: 360
- ISBN: 978-0812982855

Tell The Wolves I'm Home is the debut novel of American writer Carol Rifka Brunt, published by Random House in 2012. It follows the life of June Elbus, a 14-year-old girl, whose gay uncle died of AIDS in the 1980s, and the subsequent friendship she develops with his boyfriend. Throughout this friendship June finds comfort in knowing that her uncle, a man who inspired the love of so many, is mourned not only by the family and his partner but by the art community.

The novel chronicles June's journey as she mourns her uncle Finn's death amid the 1980s AIDS epidemic, a time when the disease was relatively unknown. Despite the association between Uncle Finn's lifestyle and the disease, June agrees to meet the partner he left behind, ultimately accepting the death of her uncle and finding herself in the process.

== Plot ==
June Elbus is a 14-year-old girl living in Westchester, New York in 1986. Her gay uncle, Finn Weiss, is dying of AIDS. Being a professional painter, he asks June and her elder sister Greta to sit for a portrait, which he completes a few days before his death. At his funeral, June notices a stranger hanging around. She learns that he is Finn's boyfriend, Toby. She is warned against him by her family, particularly her mother, who forbids June from having any contact with him.

One day Toby delivers a message to June, asking her to meet him at a train station nearby. Although initially hesitant, she decides to meet him. They ride to Finn's apartment, where Toby now lives alone. He gives her some of Finn's possessions, which he left behind for her. One of these include a book with a message to June from Finn, asking her to take care of Toby, as he had nobody else.

Meanwhile, the media learns of the portrait, which Finn named "Tell the Wolves I'm Home". Recognizing its monetary value, June's mother moves it to a bank vault and gives the keys to June and Greta. June visits it often, and notices there are additions to the painting: black buttons on her shirt and a skull behind Greta's hand, which she realizes is drawn by Greta herself. June too paints on the portrait, adding streaks of golden to their hair.

Over the months, Toby and June meet frequently, and the two become close. She realizes that much of what she has heard from her mother about Toby is false and comes from her mother's resentment of Finn. They were very close during their childhood but ever since leaving home, their lives had become very different: while she became a suburban accountant, he became a globetrotting artist, which she always aspired to be. June reveals Finn's message to Toby, who in turn says that he received a similar one, asking him to take care of June. He also tells her that he painted the buttons on the portrait moments after Finn's death, to grant his dying wish to see "more detail" in it.

Meanwhile, at home, Greta and June find it hard to get along. Greta learns of her meetings with Toby and taunts her for it, straining the sisters' already damaged relationship. Greta plays Bloody Mary in their school's presentation of South Pacific. Impressed by Greta's performance, her drama teacher suggests she act in Broadway, a prospect she is not too keen on. However, she is pressured by her mother to take a shot at it. Troubled, Greta takes to excessive drinking and smoking. She often lies drunk in the woods near her school, where June is forced to rescue her from more than once.

On the day of her show, Greta asks June to meet her in the woods after the play. The same day, June and her mother visit the bank vault, where her mother is shocked to see the additions to the painting. June takes full responsibility for it, and is grounded. During the show, June realizes that Greta is drunk. Since she cannot meet her in the woods because of being grounded, she calls Toby and asks him to bring Greta home. That night two policemen visit their house, bringing Greta along with them. They tell the Elbuses that they arrested her, along with Toby, on seeing him carry her from the woods. June's mother recognizes Toby. Greta lies that she befriended Toby and invited him to the after-show party because she felt sorry for him. The policemen leave, taking Toby along with them.

That night, Greta tells June that she was jealous of Finn for being more important to June than she was, which was why Greta grew distant from her. On Finn's death, she thought things would be like they were when the two of them were younger, but by then June was occupied with Toby. June realizes that Greta, like Toby, has nobody, and the two reconcile.

For days after his arrest, June is unable to contact Toby. She finally finds that he was admitted to a hospital due to his rapidly deteriorating health. She goes there to find him very weak. As they talk, June finally admits to Toby that Finn was her first love. She also realizes that Toby is her second. She takes him to her house, telling her parents everything about him. June hears her mother apologize to Toby. With the two of them in the room, Toby dies.

That night, June sees her mother paint a necklace on June's neck and a ring to Greta's hand in the portrait. The next day, an art inspector tells them that the portrait can be restored to its original form to undo the damage. When it is returned to the Elbuses, June notices that although Toby's, Greta's and her additions were removed, her mother's necklace and ring have been left untouched.

== Symbols ==
- Crocodile - This was the nickname that Finn created for June because of the way in which she seemed as if she was from another time. June had an obsession with the medieval times but the nickname may have been created due to the way in which she quietly handled herself, forming her own unique opinions about things instead of conforming to the opinion of others.
- South Pacific - Throughout the novel Greta was taking part in the school's production of South Pacific, playing the role of Bloody Mary. The musical itself centers around the lives of multiple of different individuals who are engaging in activities that they feared would cause them to be prejudiced again. Similar to the way in which Finn and Toby's relationship was prejudiced against within the novel, the couples in South Pacific struggle against the controversy that surrounds race.
- Middle Ages- June was extremely interested in the time period of the Middle Ages, an interest that Finn always supported by taking her to renaissance/medieval fairs. June appreciated this time for its simplicity, something that completely juxtaposed her life after Finn's death.
- Tell the Wolves I'm Home- This is the title that Finn gave to his portrait of June and Greta. Throughout the novel one of June's favorite places was the woods located near her school. She would wander around listening for the howls of the wolves that inhabit it feeling as though she were at home, in a happy place. June and Greta's relationship had become distant as they grew up, by titling his portrait like this Finn may have been sending a message to June about the importance of establishing stronger relationships with family.

== 1980s AIDS crisis in the United States ==
Throughout the novel, the protagonist, June Elbus must face her uncle Finn's death at the hands of a "mysterious illness". Originally wanting to shield June from the truth about Finn's lifestyle and death, her family does not mention the partner he left behind until he appears briefly at his funeral service. "He's the guy who killed Uncle Finn" is the way in which Greta singles out Toby at the funeral parlor, a moment that illustrates the way in which the Elbus family and the general public at the time viewed gay men and a disease that seemed to only affect them.

Also known as the "gay plague" AIDS in the 1980s was a disease relatively unknown throughout the world and especially in the United States. The gay community, pre-AIDS, was considered to be a group of individuals constantly engaging in inappropriate sexual behavior, something that already created a negative connotation surrounding gay individuals. June Elbus lived in a time when people were more open about their sexuality, but still prejudiced against for having different sexual preferences than what was considered the heterosexual norm. On June 5, 1981, MMWR (Morbidity and Mortality Weekly Report) published the cases of five, previously healthy, gay men who had died of Pneumocystis carinii pneumonia (PCP), these were the first case in the United States of what would be known as AIDS.

Although the number of deaths increased rapidly the government did not seem to consider the epidemic a priority. White House officials would answer few questions on the subject and in the off chance that they did would respond to the disease as something that the gay community may deserve for engaging in a lifestyle not agreed upon by many. Throughout the novel it seemed, especially during the final days of Finn's life, that the family blamed his sexual orientation for his declining health and ultimately his death. These opinions within the family made it extremely difficult for June to agree to meeting Toby, since the relationship he had with her uncle was the cause of his death. Throughout their friendship, however, June realized that Toby and her Uncle's relationship was nothing like the way in which gay men were depicted during the time. The way in which Toby was accepted not only by June but also by Greta before his death represented the way in which the gay community would finally achieve (after protests and a constant fight for equal rights) the governments cooperation in funding research to find a cure for the epidemic.

== Writing ==
Brunt says the inspiration for Tell The Wolves I'm Home came from an idea of "a dying uncle painting a final portrait of his niece". It started out as a short story, which she began expanding after receiving a grant from the Arts Council of England. While Brunt shares some similarities with the novel's protagonist, she has stressed that the story itself is not autobiographical. Publishers Weekly noted that Tell the Wolves I'm Home "has young adult–novel qualities, with moral conflicts that resolve themselves too easily and characters nursing hearts of gold." Brunt herself recognized this, stating in an interview that "When I first started writing it, I thought it could end up as either YA or adult", but ultimately felt it was an adult book.

== Awards ==
Tell The Wolves I'm Home was presented the Alex Award in 2013 by the Young Adult Library Services Association (YALSA). This award is given to books written for adults that appeal to adolescent readers (aged 12–18).

== Reception ==
Sam Sacks of The Wall Street Journal called it a "tremendously moving debut novel [that imbues] June with the disarming candor of a child and the melancholy wisdom of a heart-scarred adult." Writing for Paste, Carla Jean Whitley gave it an 8 out of a possible 10, calling it an "immensely satisfying tale ... offer[ing] insight into the complicated web of human emotions." Samantha Nelson of The A.V. Club graded it an A− and said the book "provides an earnest look at the burdens of choice and the fear of missed opportunities", but disliked the change in narratives from present-day June to future June. The novel was named one of the best books of the year by The Wall Street Journal, O: The Oprah Magazine, Kirkus, BookPage and Amazon. Brunt's debut novel was also chosen as a Barnes and Nobles Discover Pick, Target Club Pick, and Costco Pennies Pick. The novel has so far been translated into 18 languages, and is currently a New York Times Best Seller (#18).
