= Shari Lapena =

Canadian novelist

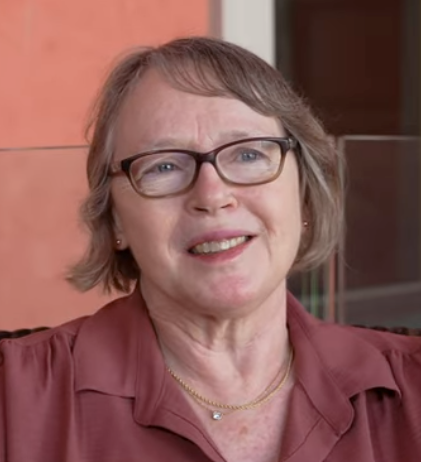
- In a 2026 interview
- Born: 1960 (age 65–66)
- Occupations: Novelist, lawyer, teacher

Shari Lapena (born 1960) is a Canadian novelist.

Lapena, a lawyer and English teacher before beginning her writing career, published her debut novel Things Go Flying in 2008. That novel was shortlisted for the Sunburst Award in 2009. Her second novel, Happiness Economics, was a Stephen Leacock Award finalist in 2012. Her books have been sold in forty territories around the world. She lives in Toronto.

Lapena became best known for her 2016 thriller novel The Couple Next Door, which was a bestseller both in Canada and internationally. An upcoming Paramount+ limited series was in development as of 2026.

== Works ==
- Things Go Flying (2008)
- Happiness Economics (2011)
- The Couple Next Door (2016)
- A Stranger in the House (2017)
- An Unwanted Guest (2018)
- Someone We Know (2019)
- The End of Her (2020)
- Not a Happy Family (2021)
- Everyone Here Is Lying (2023)
- What Have You Done (2024)
- She Didn't See It Coming (2025)
- Getting Away With Murder (2026)
