= Andrew Cope =

English children's author

Andy Cope (born 1966) is an English children's author. He has written book series such as Spy Dog, Spy Pups and Spy Cat (Puffin). He has also written Raccoon Rampage and Racoon Rampage: The Raid for HarperCollins.

Cope was born in Derby in 1966. In addition to writing children's books, he also describes himself as a teacher, trainer and learning junkie. He completed a PhD (Loughborough University, UK) specializing in happiness and flourishing in the workplace. He set up a training company in 2005. 'Art of Brilliance Ltd' delivers a wide range of positive psychology and wellbeing programmes to business and schools around the world. Their flagship programme, 'The Art of Being Brilliant' became a best-selling book in 2012. Andy has written several other books in the wellbeing genre:

- Be Brilliant Everyday (Capstone)
- The Little Book of Emotional Intelligence (Hodder)
- Shine (Capstone)
- Zest (Capstone)
- Leadership: The Multiplier Effect (Hodder)
- The Little Book of Being Brilliant (Capstone)
- How to be a WELL BEING (Capstone)

Andy has also teamed up colleagues to write personal development books aimed at teenagers and young people:

- Diary of a Brilliant Kid (Capstone)
- The Art of Being a Brilliant Teenager (Capstone)
- A Teenager's Guide to Awesomeness (Hodder)

Andy has also set up a Brilliant Schools initiative, aimed at getting wellbeing onto the educational agenda. He was presented with a Points of Light Award in recognition of the various city-wide schools projects that he's initiated

== Awards ==
- Spy Dog: Winner of the Redhouse Children's Book of the Year 2006
- Spy Dog: Winner of Richard & Judy Book Club "Developing" 7+ category"
