= The Skin I'm In =

1998 novel by Sharon G. Flake

- Author: Sharon G. Flake
- Language: English
- Subject: Bullying
- Genre: Realistic fiction
- Publisher: Hyperion
- Publication date: 1998
- Publication place: United States
- Media type: Print (paperback)
- Pages: 171
- ISBN: 0-7868-1307-5
- Followed by: The Life I'm In

The Skin I'm In is a realistic fiction novel written by Sharon G. Flake. It was published by Hyperion Books on January 3, 2000. It tells the story of seventh-grader Maleeka Madison who has low self-esteem because of her dark brown skin color. The novel's themes include self-love, self-esteem, the power of friendship, bullying and body image. The anniversary edition was released in October 2018. In 2021, Sharon Flake published a sister novel, The Life I'm In, following the character Charlese Jones.

== Synopsis ==
Maleeka is a seventh-grader who struggles with her body image due both to society and her classmates' colorist bullying. Throughout the novel, Maleeka struggles and ultimately succeeds in standing up for herself and coming to love her skin. After the terrible death of her father at age 10, her mother deals with depression by sewing clothes for her daughter. But she is a poor seamstress and people make fun of her clothes and parents in Alabama.

== Main characters ==
- Maleeka Madison – A poor African-American girl who feels unpopular at her middle school because of her dark skin color and clothing.
- Charlese Jones (Char) – The antagonist of the story.
- Miss Saunders – Maleeka's English teacher.
- Caleb – Maleeka's love interest.
- Raina and Raise – aka "the twins", Charlese's sidekicks.
- Mrs. Madison – Maleeka's mother, a widow.
- John-John – Maleeka's tormentor since 2nd grade.

== Awards ==
- Coretta Scott King/John Steptoe Award for New Talent
