= David Wolstencroft =

American-born British screenwriter and author

- Born: 16 July 1969 (age 57); Honolulu, Hawaii, U.S.
- Education: Emmanuel College, Cambridge
- Occupation: Writer
- Spouse: Flore Rougier (m. 2019)

David Wolstencroft (born 16 July 1969) is an American-born British screenwriter and author. He is best known as creator of the BAFTA award-winning TV spy drama Spooks and its spin-off series Spooks: Code 9.

== Early life ==
Wolstencroft was born in Honolulu, United States in 1969 and grew up in Edinburgh, Scotland, studying at George Watson's College, where he was Head Boy. He then studied at Emmanuel College, Cambridge, where he graduated with a "starred first" degree in history. While at Cambridge, he was active in the Footlights where he collaborated with Mark Evans, Sue Perkins, Andy Parsons, Alexander Armstrong, and Ben Miller, and had served as Footlight's vice president and revue director.

== Career ==
Wolstencroft won the Royal Television Society's Network Newcomer award after producing his first drama Psychos for Channel 4 in 1999. He then began working on Spooks. The pilot episode was watched by over 9 million people (a 41% share), and the series won a number of BAFTA awards and nominations.

More recently, he has written, created and executive produced The Escape Artist for BBC One and Versailles for Canal+ with fellow Spooks scribe and ex-Criminal Minds producer and writer Simon Mirren. Wolstencroft also wrote the screenplay for the film Shooting Dogs. He is also the author of two espionage thriller novels: Good News, Bad News and Contact Zero, which was nominated for the Ian Fleming Silver Dagger.

Wolstencroft's debut children's book The Magic Hour, a fantasy adventure, was published in 2023.
