= White Chrysanthemum =

2016 novel by Mary Lynn Bracht

- Hardcover edition
- Author: Mary Lynn Bracht
- Language: English
- Genre: Historical Fiction
- Published: 2017
- Publisher: G. P. Putnam's Sons
- Publication place: United States
- ISBN: 9780735214439

White Chrysanthemum is a novel written by Mary Lynn Bracht. It was published by G. P. Putnam's Sons in 2018. The novel is based on comfort women, Korea, Japan, and history. The novel has fictional names, characters, places, and incidents. It is written in dual timelines that are split between the two women: Hana's life during the 1940s and Emi's life in 2011. The novel switches between the two women's perspectives intermittently during the novel. One chapter of the novel is told from the perspective of YoonHui, Emi's daughter. The novel includes a map from 1943, further readings, and a notable dates section.

Taking place in Korea, White Chrysanthemum is about two sisters named Hana and Emi that are separated by World War II. The sisters are haenyeo - free divers - and belong to a strong female community. At the age of 16 years old, Hana is taken away by a Japanese soldier forced to become a comfort woman. The novel focuses on the experiences of comfort women and how the war impacted different hierarchies of individuals from multiple perspectives. The dual timeline gives a perspective as events unfold through Hana's experience in the 1940s and a later perspective in 2011 from Emi's experience.

== Plot summary ==
The novel begins with the two sisters on the beach of Jeju Island; Hana is with her mother as she dives for abalone and Emi is waiting on the sand. Hana swims toward Emi as a soldier approaches, and hides her sister as the man talks to her. He is a Japanese soldier named Corporal Morimoto, and has Hana taken with him, leaving her sister behind. The novel then splits between the two women as Hana becomes a comfort woman and Emi searches for her sister sixty years later.

=== Hana's Perspective (1940s) ===
Hana is brought to a police station where she maintains the lie that she told Corporal Morimoto, that her family is dead, by giving a false last name so they cannot locate them. Hana and other girls are led into a room where they are to re-dress in clothing before they are put in a truck. Hana is separated from the group and is brought to a ferry with other comfort women who were stored inside and being transported to an undisclosed location. Corporal Morimoto rapes Hana, she is then returned to the rest of the women as they arrive to a train depot. Once boarded with soldiers to keep guard, the women on the train learn that they are headed to Manchuria where she is then taken to a brothel.

The next morning, the local soldiers learn of the arrival of new comfort women, prompting them to visit Hana. Corporal Morimoto visits Hana each night he is on duty and rapes her. Hana flees the brothel after remaining there for a period of time, only to be caught by Corporal Morimoto. He tells her that he is taking her to Mongolia.

When she is brought to Mongolia, she stays with two men and a woman. She is unable to communicate with them because she does not speak Mongolian. Corporal Morimoto leaves for a period of time, and Hana begins to learn terms in Mongolian and about the people she is staying with. Morimoto comes back, and Hana tries to run away on horseback. Morimoto eventually catches up to her, but the two are taken by Soviet soldiers. The soldiers kill Corporal Morimoto, and release Hana to the Mongolian family. They bring her back to the place they live. The novel, from Hana's perspective, ends with her swimming in Lake Uvs.

=== Emi's Perspective (2011) ===
Emi is beginning her dive as a haenyeo woman with JinHee, a fellow diver. Emi talks about a dream she often has where she is standing on a cliff and hears a girl's voice calling for her that is familiar but strange. Emi is revealed to be seventy seven years old, and talks about diving being a gift that her mother taught her. Emi talks about how she does not visit her children often because she has a distant relationship with them. She takes a taxi and then an airplane to Seoul to visit her daughter YoonHui, her son Hyoung, and her grandson YoungSook.

JinHee convinced Emi to go to the inaugural ceremony of the Jeju Peace Park that commemorates the 1948 Jeju Uprising. The 1948 Jeju Uprising led to the massacre of over twenty thousand islanders, according to Emi. She recalls how her family home was burned when she was fourteen years old. When she attended the event, she noticed how everyone was carrying the same flowers, white chrysanthemums, which are a symbol of mourning.

Emi is at the one thousandth Wednesday Demonstration that has happened since 1992. She remembers how in 1948, before the Korean War had begun, her father had his throat slit by a policeman in front of her and her mother. Her and her mother fled to a cove and ate the insects, moss, and creatures that were in the cove. When they were on the brink of starvation, they returned to their destroyed house. Policemen discovered them and brought them to a police station. The man who had brought them to the station, HyunMo, forced Emi to marry him. When Emi is back in the present moment of the Demonstration, Emi meets a group of older women and asks if they knew a Hana. They answer by saying that they were named after flowers, but did not know each other's real names. They talk of women being taken from various locations, such as China, the Philippines, Malaysia, and Dutch women. They talked of the first comfort woman to come forward, Kim Hak-sun in 1991. The Demonstration continues, and there is a statue of peace that Emi knows is of Hana. Emi tells her children that she was not an only child, and that she did not tell them because of shame. She reveals that her sister, Hana, sacrificed herself to save her.

Hyoung asks Emi why she hated their father. She reveals to her children that they did not marry out of love but because of the war. She was fourteen when she was married. Emi did not believe that he married her for love; only for her family's land. She was pregnant at sixteen and afraid of being a mother. After learning that HyunMo had her mother killed, she told her son that he was the only thing that kept her from killing herself. Her son was born the year the Korean War begun. When her husband was on his deathbed, he thanked her for their children, he said he always loved her in his own way, asked that she not hate him so much after he dies, that she light incense for his ancestors, and that she forgive him for everything. Emi visits the statue again with her children. She says that it is her sister Hana. She tells YoonHui that she was proud that she went to university, and that she was proud of her son. Emi thinks to herself that she has finally found Hana.

=== YoonHui's Perspective (2012) ===
YoonHui is in the sea and wants to dive to remember what it is like to be a haenyeo like her mother. JinHee is with her, and YoonHui uses her mother's mask. JinHee tells her that Emi was proud of her. YoonHui visited the statue after her mother had died with Lane and her nephew. Her nephew pointed out that someone had left flowers; they were white chrysanthemums. Lane found the artist that made the statue and they shared a black and white photograph that inspired the statue. It was from the daughter of a woman who was captured by Russian soldiers during World War II and had donated it to the Museum of Sexual Slavery. It had the label of haenyeo girl, with the date 1993. YoonHui tells the statue goodbye Aunt Hana.

== Style ==
Mary Lynn Bract said in an interview that the authors she either had previously read or read while working on this novel were Toni Morrison, Kyung-Sook Shin, Annie Proulx, Muriel Barbery, Marilynne Robinson, Maya Angelou, Michael Ondaatje, George Orwell, Helen Dunmore, Kimiko Hahn, and Chimamanda Ngozi Adichie. She states that reading good writing can lead to creativity, so she picks up books if she is ever stuck so she can think of where she wants her books to go and how to get them to go in that direction.

== Reception ==
Kirkus Reviews attributes the author with writing the novel in a "lyrical" manner while integrating historical events, however, it is "relentlessly and explicitly brutal [that] it runs the risk of numbing, or perhaps exhausting, the reader". The Guardian comments on how the author demonstrates pain through her characters, and how the novel "forces us to confront the inescapability of these traumas". The Guardian continues to remark that "the novel will affect readers differently, depending on their background". The Asian Review of Books considers the novel to be "thought-provoking" for its incorporation of politics, "the personal and familial", and the "horrific" that may contribute to the remembrance of comfort women so that they are not forgotten. The Irish Times characterizes the novel as having "the starkness of witness literature" yet encounters moments of "awkwardness" in the author's style when authorial tone takes the place of voices of the characters.
