= A Boy Made of Blocks =

2016 novel by Keith Stuart

- First edition (US)
- Author: Keith Stuart
- Published: 2016
- Publisher: St. Martin's Press
- ISBN: 9781250111593

A Boy Made of Blocks is a novel by video game journalist Keith Stuart, first published in 2016 by St. Martin's Press.

Publishers Weekly described the book as a "funny and insightful novel about a neurotypical father's struggle to connect with his autistic son." The book also received reviews from publications including The Guardian and Irish Examiner.
