= Rosamund Lupton =

British writer (born 1964)

- Born: Rosamund Jane Orde-Powlett; 22 July 1964 (age 62)
- Education: University of Cambridge
- Spouse: Martin Lupton (1999-present)

Rosamund Jane Lupton (née Orde-Powlett), is a British writer. She studied literature at Cambridge University. She is perhaps best known for her novels Sister, Afterwards, The Quality of Silence and Three Hours.

== Early life and family ==
Lupton was born on 22 July 1964, the daughter of the Hon. Patrick Christopher Orde-Powlett, son of Nigel Amyas Orde-Powlett, 6th Baron Bolton of Bolton Castle. On 1 May 1999, she married Martin Geoffrey Francis Lupton, son of Geoffrey Charles Martineau Lupton (1930-2019), the grandson of Leeds Lord Mayor Hugh Lupton and nephew of Arther Ransome.

== Career ==
In her first novel, Sister, Lupton tells the story of Beatrice, living in New York, searching for Tess, her missing sister, who lives in London.

Sister sold over 1.5 million copies worldwide. It has been translated into 30 languages, and it is a bestseller on the New York Times and Sunday Times lists. It received positive reviews from critics.

Her second novel, Afterwards, was chosen as one of the "best mystery books of 2012" by the Seattle Times, and "best book of 2012" by Amazon.com.

FilmNation optioned the film rights to her third novel, The Quality of Silence, in March 2016. Her new novel, Three Hours, was published in January 2020 and is a Sunday Times bestseller and the Times thriller of the year

Rosamund Lupton was a winner of Carlton Television's new writers' competition, and before being a novelist, she was a script-writer for television and film, writing original screenplays for shows such as The Bill, Bramwell and Medics.

== Works ==
Published Works
Title	Publication Date	ISBN	Citation
Sister	September 2, 2010	9780749942014	
Afterwards	April 24, 2012	9780307716545	
The Quality of Silence	February 16, 2016	9781101903674	
Three Hours	January 9, 2020	9780241374511	
