= Anna Hope =

British actress

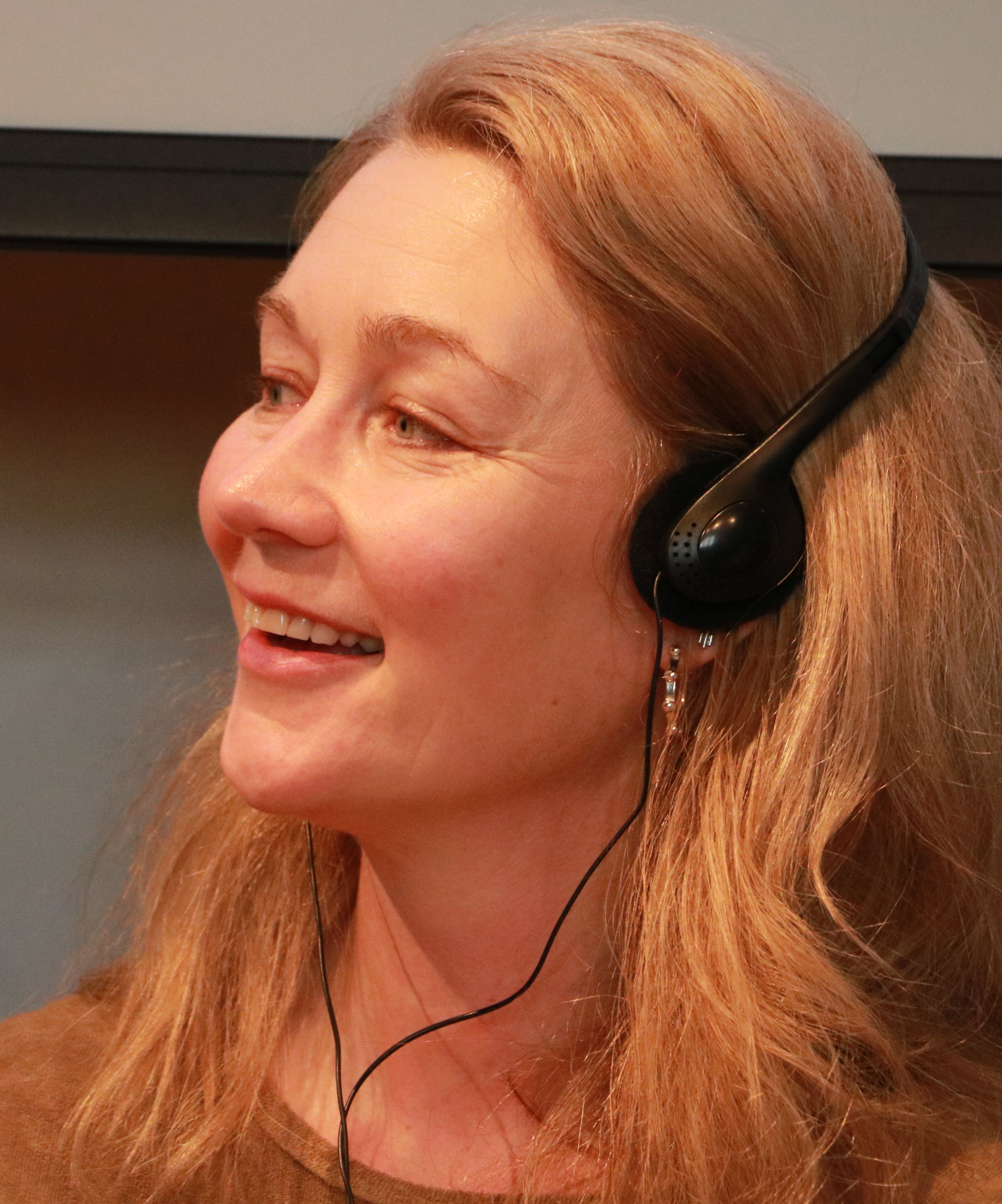
- Hope in 2024
- Born: 1974 (age 50–51)
- Occupation: Actress

Anna Hope (born 1974) is an English writer and actress from Manchester. She is perhaps best known for her Doctor Who role of Novice Hame, who first appeared in the webcast TARDISODE 1 - "New Earth" before appearing in the television episodes "New Earth" and "Gridlock," and later as Senator Hame in the Big Finish Productions audio set Tales from New Earth..

She has also appeared as the character of detective inspector Patricia Menzies in the 6th Doctor audio plays The Condemned, The Raincloud Man, and The Crimes of Thomas Brewster.

== Early life and education ==
Hope grew up in the village of Edgworth, Bolton, Lancashire where she attended Edgworth Primary School and Turton High School before moving to Manchester, aged 16, where she attended William Hulme's Grammar School.

She was educated at Wadham College, Oxford, The Royal Academy of Dramatic Art, London, and Birkbeck College, London. She studied English at Wadham College and graduated in 2001 from Birkbeck College with an MA in Creative Writing.

== Career ==
=== Acting ===
Hope began acting in small plays that she would put on with her sisters at home, before eventually joining the Octagon Youth Theatre, in Bolton, aged 10.

Hope auditioned alongside 20 different actresses for the role of Novice Hame, and admitted that, upon winning the part, she felt nervous that the role might demand complex cat choreography and gestures.

Hope's other appearances include Crime and Punishment, Waking the Dead, and Coronation Street.

Hope is represented by Feast Management, based in London, and Felicity Bryan Associates.

=== Writing ===
Hope's first novel, Wake, was published in January 2014 by Doubleday UK and Random House USA. Hope was on the shortlist for the New Writer of the Year 2014 of the National Book Awards. The novel centred on three different women living through World War I and the effect that it had on them back at home. Her second novel The Ballroom was published in 2016. Her third novel, Expectation, was published in 2019. Her fourth novel, Albion, was published in 2025.

== Bibliography ==
- Wake. London: Doubleday. 2014. ISBN 978-0-85752-194-1.
- The Ballroom. London: Doubleday. 2016. ISBN 978-0-85752-196-5.
- Expectation. London: Doubleday. 2019. ISBN 978-0-85752-490-4.
- Albion. London: Penguin. 2025. ISBN 978-0-24169-843-3.
