= Helen Simonson =

English novelist

Helen Simonson is an English author who lives in the United States.

== Early life ==
Helen Simonson was born and raised in England. When she was a teenager, her family moved to East Sussex. She attended university in London, then moved to the United States, where she has lived for more than three decades and is a citizen. She is a resident of Brooklyn and has also lived in the Washington, D.C. area. Her first two books are set in rural East Sussex.

== Bibliography ==
- Simonson, Helen (2010). Major Pettigrew's Last Stand. Random House. ISBN 9781400068937.
- Simonson, Helen (2016). The Summer Before the War. Random House. ISBN 9780812993103.
- Simonson, Helen (2024). The Hazelbourne Ladies Motorcycle and Flying Club. Random House. ISBN 9781984801319.

== Film ==
Screen rights to Major Pettigrew's Last Stand were sold in 2011 to producers Paula Mazur, Mitchell Kaplan and Kevin McCormick. They hired Jack Thorne to write the screenplay.
