= Richard & Judy =

British TV chat show (2001–2009)

- Also known as: Richard & Judy's New Position
- Genre: Chat show
- Presented by: Richard Madeley; Judy Finnigan
- Country of origin: United Kingdom
- Original language: English
- No. of series: 10 (Channel 4); 1 (Watch)
- No. of episodes: 1,129 (Channel 4); 151 (Watch)

Production
- Executive producers: Simon Ross (2001–2009); Amanda Ross (2001–2009)
- Running time: 60 minutes (inc. adverts)
- Production company: Cactus TV

Original release
- Network: Channel 4 (2001–2008); Watch (2008–2009)
- Release: 26 November 2001 – 1 July 2009

Related
- This Morning (1988–present)

Richard & Judy (also known as Richard & Judy's New Position) is a British television chat show presented by the married couple Richard Madeley and Judy Finnigan. The show originally aired on Channel 4 from 26 November 2001 to 22 August 2008, and moved to digital channel Watch from 7 October 2008 to 1 July 2009.

== 2001–08: Channel 4 ==
Richard & Judy started with Channel 4 on 26 November 2001 and aired every weekday from 5pm to 6pm with breaks in-between. Between 2006 and 2008, the Richard & Judy show shared this original timeslot with The Paul O'Grady Show, a programme that started in March 2006. For three months of each year, between 2006 and 2008, the Richard & Judy show occupied the 5pm to 6pm slot (January to March and June to August), and then the Paul O'Grady Show occupied the timeframe for the following three months (March to June and September to December).

On the 15 August 2008 edition of the show, Richard stated that the following week's episode would be the last with Channel 4 and the final broadcast occurred on 22 August 2008.

== 2008–09: Watch ==
Following the show's departure from Channel 4, the producers of Richard & Judy subsequently signed a £2 million deal with the UKTV network Watch. Madeley and Finnigan renamed the show and hosted Richard & Judy's New Position from 7 October 2008. The couple stated that the new version would be "a high octane prime time show", with Madeley explaining, "we [Madeley and Finnigan] were both hugely impressed with the team at UKTV, and their proposal was attractive and fun and will give us the kind of flexibility in our personal lives which we have been looking for". The presenters continued featuring the programme's popular "Book Club" that had begun on their Channel 4 show.

The Watch version of the show featured a sofa area for interviews, as well as a bar area where the star guests and the show's crew members gathered during broadcasts. Each week the show employed a celebrity barman; comedian Rufus Hound undertook the role in the first week's episode. Hound had been a frequent guest on the Channel 4 series.

The first episode of the Watch series attracted an average audience of around 200,000 viewers (this figure included those who watched the show on Watch+1). The second episode, in the 8pm timeslot, attracted 53,000 viewers. Watch channel representatives were reportedly satisfied with the ratings, stating that the show had started well. Ratings consistently fell for subsequent episodes, reaching a new low of 11,000 viewers.

Following a Christmas break at the end of 2008, the show returned on 13 January 2009 in a new 6pm slot. The show also dropped the "New Position" section of its title and was called "Richard & Judy" again.

By April 2009, ratings had slumped and the following month, an agreement was reached to terminate the show six months early. From the week of 8 June 2009, the show was reduced to a single weekly episode that aired at 4pm every Wednesday. The show's final episode was broadcast on 1 July 2009.

== You Say We Pay ==
"You Say We Pay" was a daily competition that involved a viewer at home describing images on a TV screen for the show's two presenters (the hosts cannot see the images, as the screen is behind them) to then identify without calling the displayed objects by their ordinary names. For each correct answer provided by Madeley and Finnigan, the viewer received £1000.

In January 2006, MP and Celebrity Big Brother contestant George Galloway entered the competition and won his housemates' weekly shopping budget. Lionel Blair, Abi Titmuss and Carol Vorderman also participated in "You Say We Pay" whilst they were guests on the programme.

=== Controversy ===
On 18 February 2007, the Mail on Sunday reported that it had received leaked emails from the programme, which suggested that viewers were being invited to call the show for a chance of entering the competition, even though the winner had already been chosen. On 22 February, following Channel 4's admittance that several series of the programme could have been affected and a claim from a contestant that the problems existed in 2002, ICSTIS announced their intention to conduct an inquiry into the programme.

The programme was the first in a long line of British programmes that had misled audiences into calling premium-rate numbers under false pretences, leading to the greater phone-in scandal.

As a result of the controversy, Channel 4 received a £150,000 fine from ICSTIS, and a further £1 million fine from Ofcom. There was no evidence to suggest that Madeley or Finnigan had any knowledge of the scandal.

== Richard & Judy Book Club ==
In 2004, the Richard & Judy Book Club was added as a regular segment of the show. It was credited as having a massive effect on the sales of the books it featured, much like Oprah's Book Club in the USA. Each year the segment featured ten books and discussions during the programme, often with guests. Alongside the discussions and programme features, the novels contended for the Richard & Judy Book of the Year Award, presented at the British Book Awards, where the winner was chosen by votes from the public.

The Richard and Judy Book Club debuted as a website in autumn 2010, run in conjunction with retailer WH Smith.

In 2007, Richard and Judy hosted a special Children's Book Club edition of the show as part of Channel 4's "Lost For Words" season. The featured books were chosen with the help of pupils from several schools around the UK. The New Writers Book Club was a feature launched in October 2008 focusing on debut authors.

== Richard & Judy Wine Club ==
Richard and Judy launched their wine club in 2005. Focusing on a different selection of wine each week, they reviewed the wines and gave tasting notes to the viewers.

== Transmissions ==
Series	Start date	End date	Episodes	Notes
1	26 November 2001	28 June 2002	??	
2	16 September 2002	25 July 2003	??	No episodes aired from 21–29 November 2002
3	15 September 2003	21 July 2004	??	
4	6 September 2004	2005	??	
5	5 September 2005	24 March 2006	??	
6	19 June 2006	1 September 2006	55	
7	29 January 2007	30 March 2007	45	
8	18 June 2007	31 August 2007	55	
9	7 January 2008	14 March 2008	50	
10	16 June 2008	22 August 2008	50	
11	7 October 2008	1 July 2009	??	
