= Folley =

Folley is a surname. Notable people with the surname include:

- A. J. Folley (1896–1981), Texas Supreme Court justice
- Caitlyn Folley, American actress
- Charles Teiko Folley (born 1991), Ghanaian footballer
- David Folley (born 1960), English painter
- Ian Folley (1963–1993), English cricketer
- Jess Folley, singer
- Zora Folley (1932–1972), American boxer
