= Exclusive Books Boeke Prize =

The Exclusive Books Boeke Prize is a book prize which was awarded in South Africa from 1995 to 2012.

== Award ==
The award was loosely modelled on the United Kingdom's Booker Prize, and sponsored by Exclusive Books. Although boeke is an Afrikaans word, the plural form of the word for "book", the Boeke Prize has only been awarded to novels written in English.

Launched in 1995, the award was made mostly to first novels or works: 12 of the first 19 winners were debut works. The books were judged by a panel of book critics (40 in 2008).

Ten of the books to receive the award have had a film adaptation released.

== Winners ==
=== Judges' Award ===
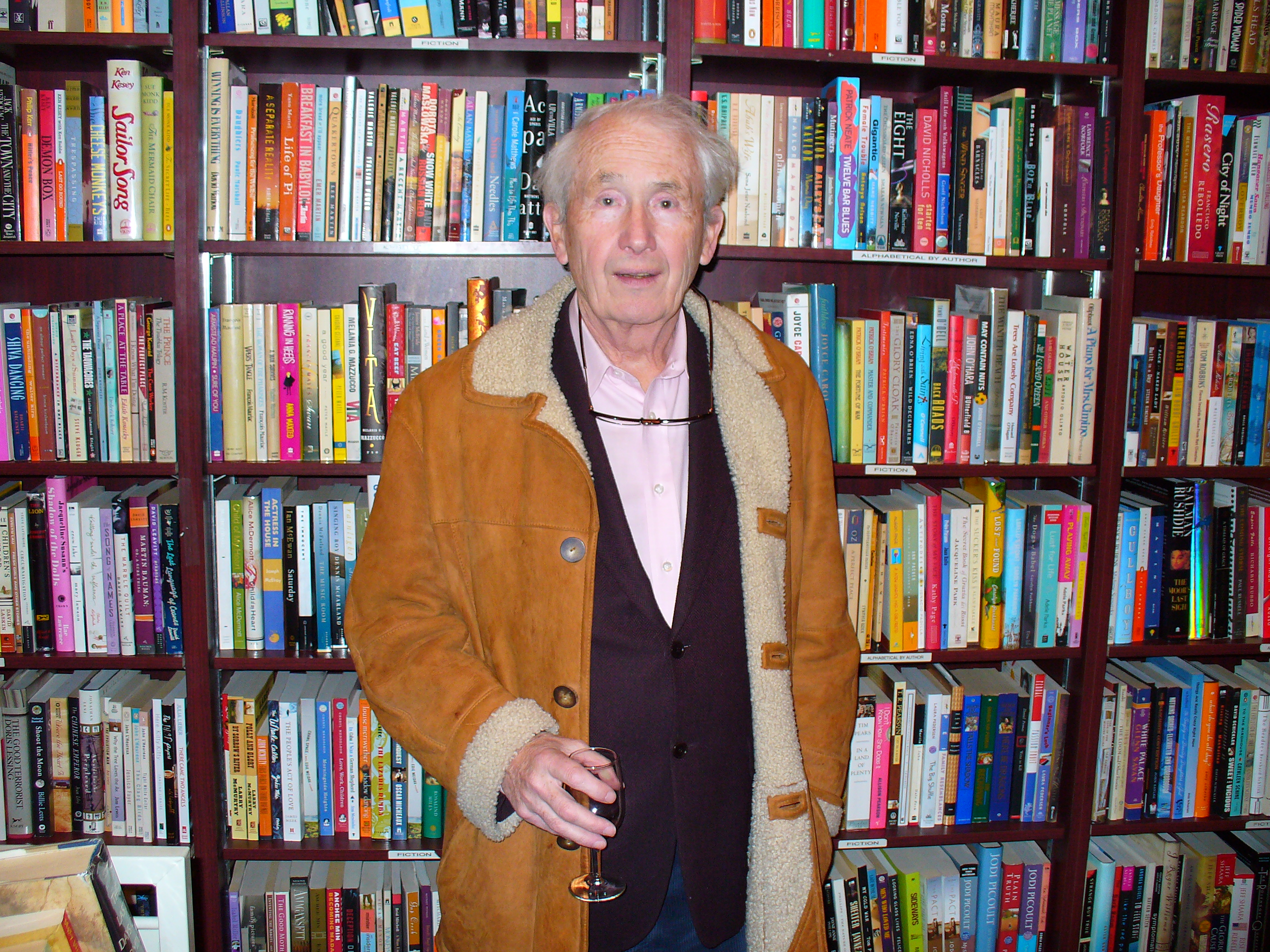
Angela's Ashes author Frank McCourt

Year	Title	Author
1995	Midnight in the Garden of Good and Evil	John Berendt
1996	Behind the Scenes at the Museum	Kate Atkinson
1997	Angela's Ashes	Frank McCourt
1998	Cold Mountain	Charles Frazier
1999	The Reader	Bernhard Schlink
2000	The Poisonwood Bible	Barbara Kingsolver
2001	Eddie's Bastard	William Kowalski
2002	Atonement	Ian McEwan
2003	Life of Pi	Yann Martel
2004	The Curious Incident of the Dog in the Night-Time	Mark Haddon
2004	The Kite Runner	Khaled Hosseini
2005	The Time-Traveler's Wife	Audrey Niffenegger
2006	Q & A	Vikas Swarup
2007	The Book Thief	Markus Zusak
2008	The Girl with the Dragon Tattoo	Stieg Larsson
2009	The Help	Kathryn Stockett
2010	One Day	David Nicholls
2011	When God Was a Rabbit	Sarah Winman
2012	Gone Girl	Gillian Flynn

=== Exclusive Books Fanatics choice ===
Year	Title	
2010	The Postmistress	Sarah Blake
2011	Thirteen Hours	Deon Meyer
2012	The Unlikely Pilgrimage of Harold Fry	Rachel Joyce

== See also ==
- Amstel Playwright of the Year Award
- M-Net Literary Awards
- Exclusive Books
