= Bernardino di Mariotto =

Italian painter (c. 1478–1566)

Bernardino Di Mariotto dello Stagno (Perugia, circa 1478 - Perugia, 1566) was an Italian painter of the Renaissance period.

== Biography ==
He trained first under either Lodovico di Angelo Mattioli of Perugia or Fiorenzo di Lorenzo, and later worked in the studio of Lorenzo da San Severino the Younger and of Vittore Crivelli. He was in San Severino Marche by 1502, and after Lorenzo's death in 1503 took over his workshop. He returned to Perugia in 1522, and was active there until 1541.

== Gallery ==
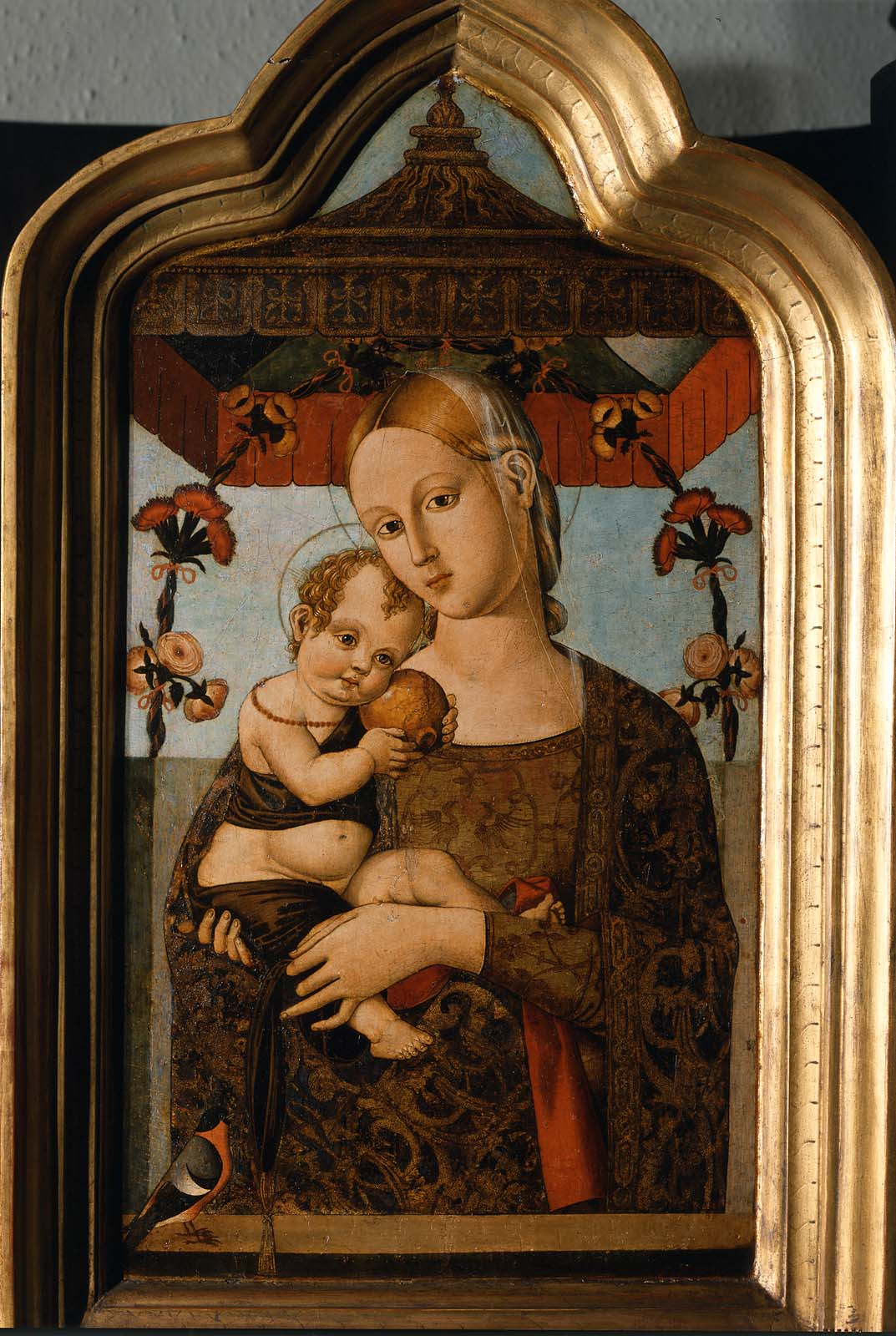
Virgin and Child

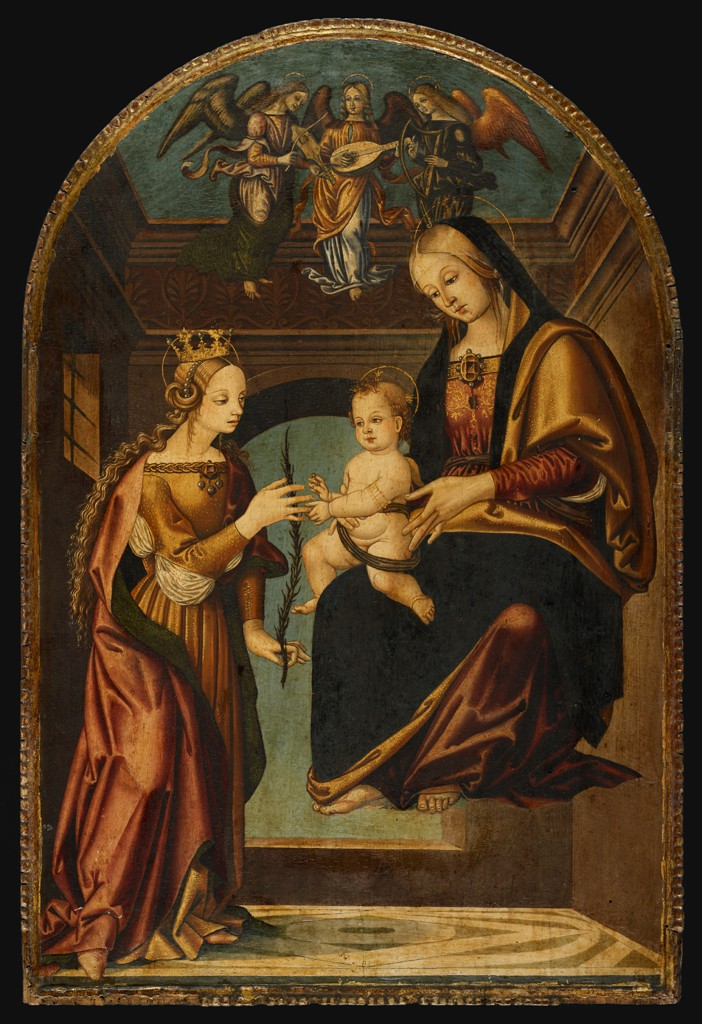
The Mystic Marriage of Saint Catherine of Alexandria, circa 1500

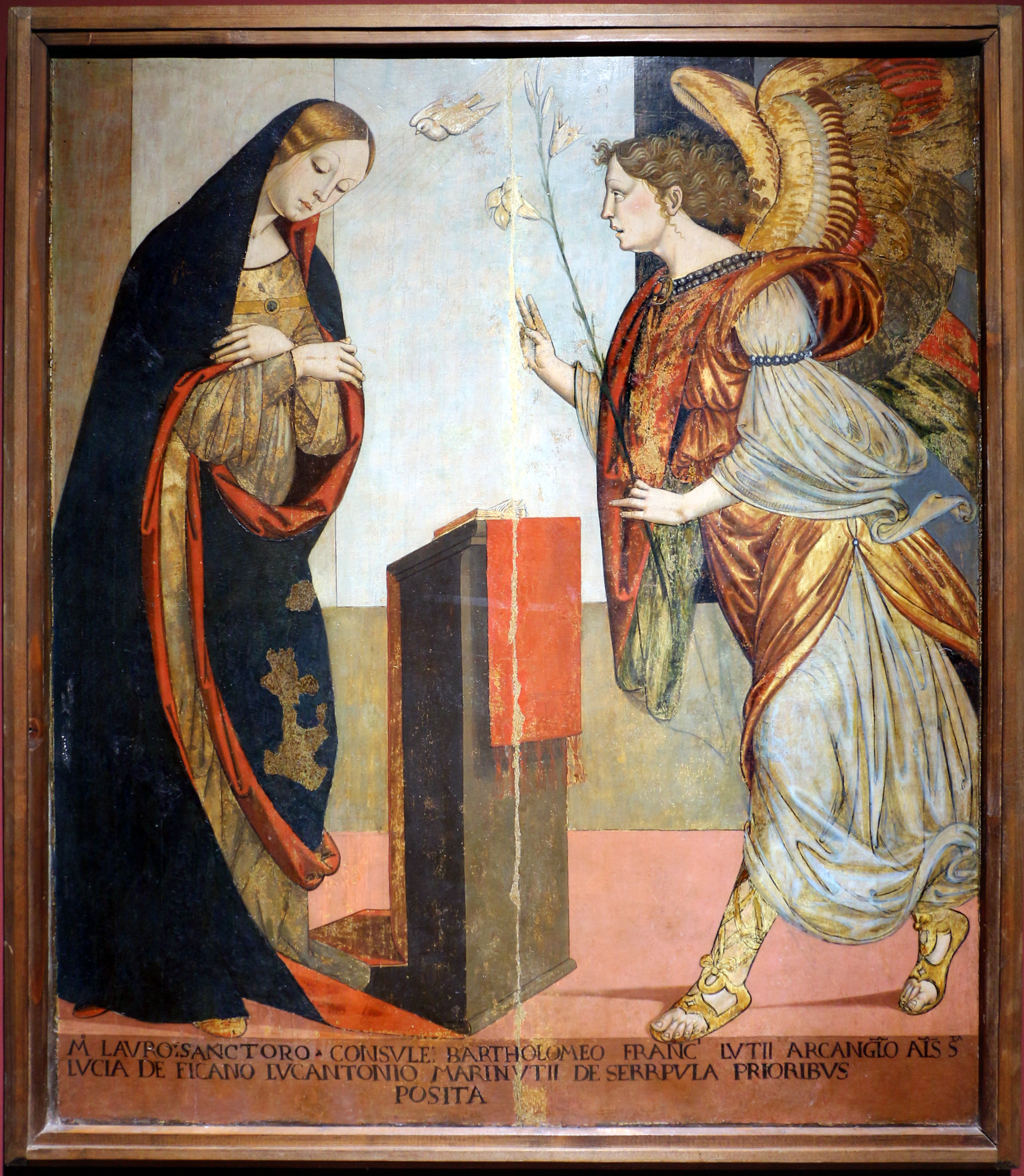
Annunciation, 1514

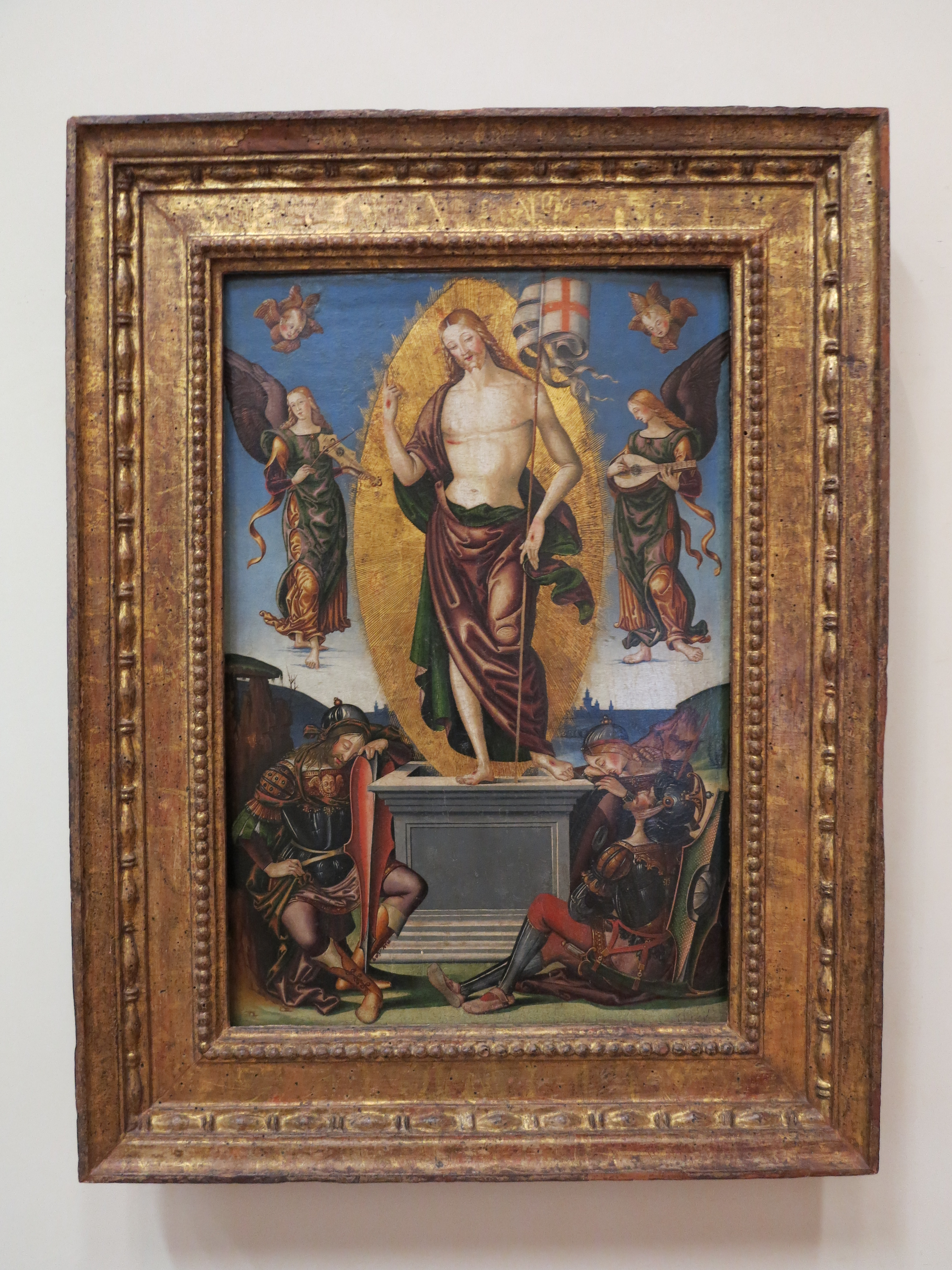
Resurrection

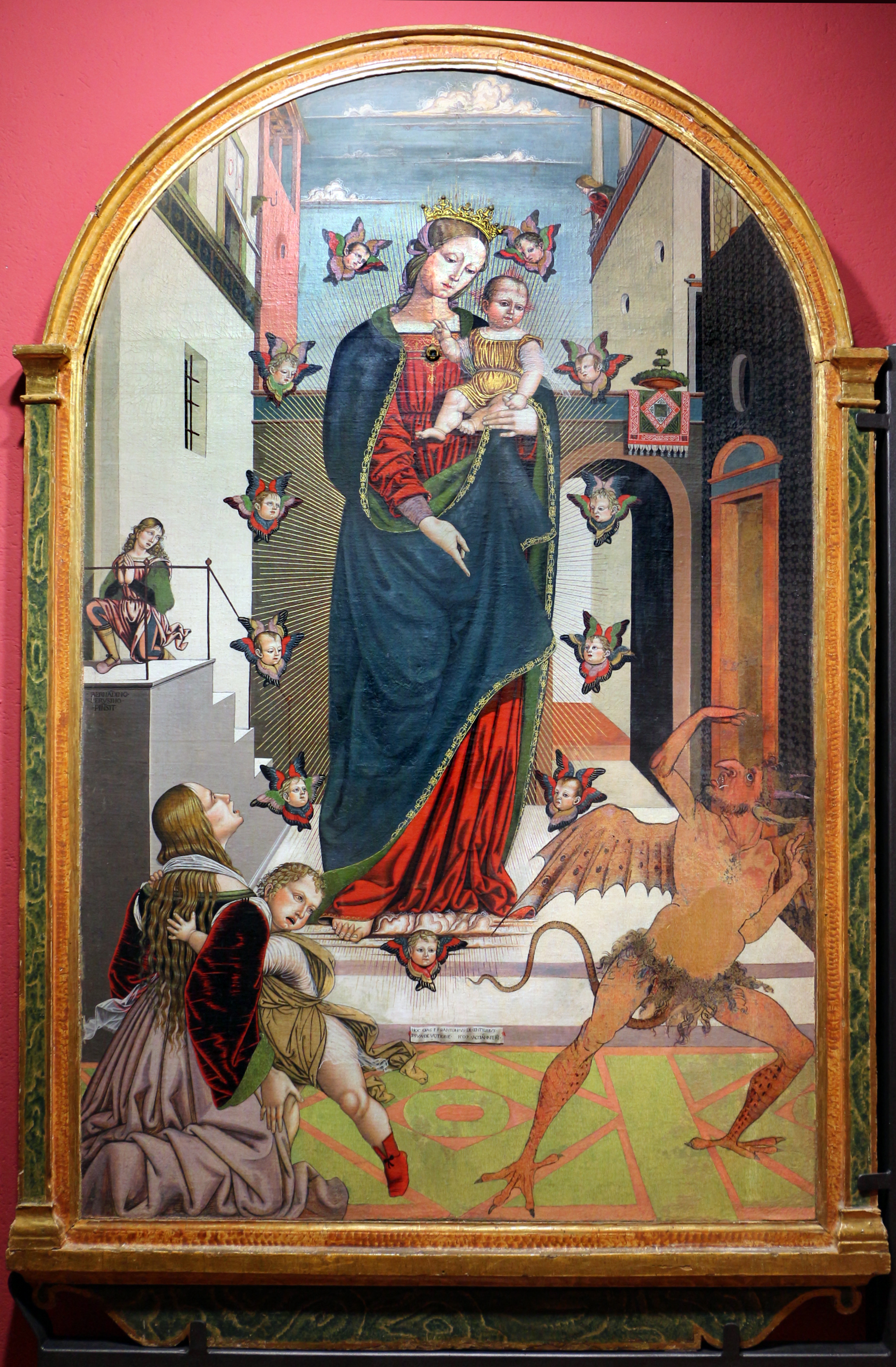
Madonna del Soccorso, 1509, dal duomo vecchio

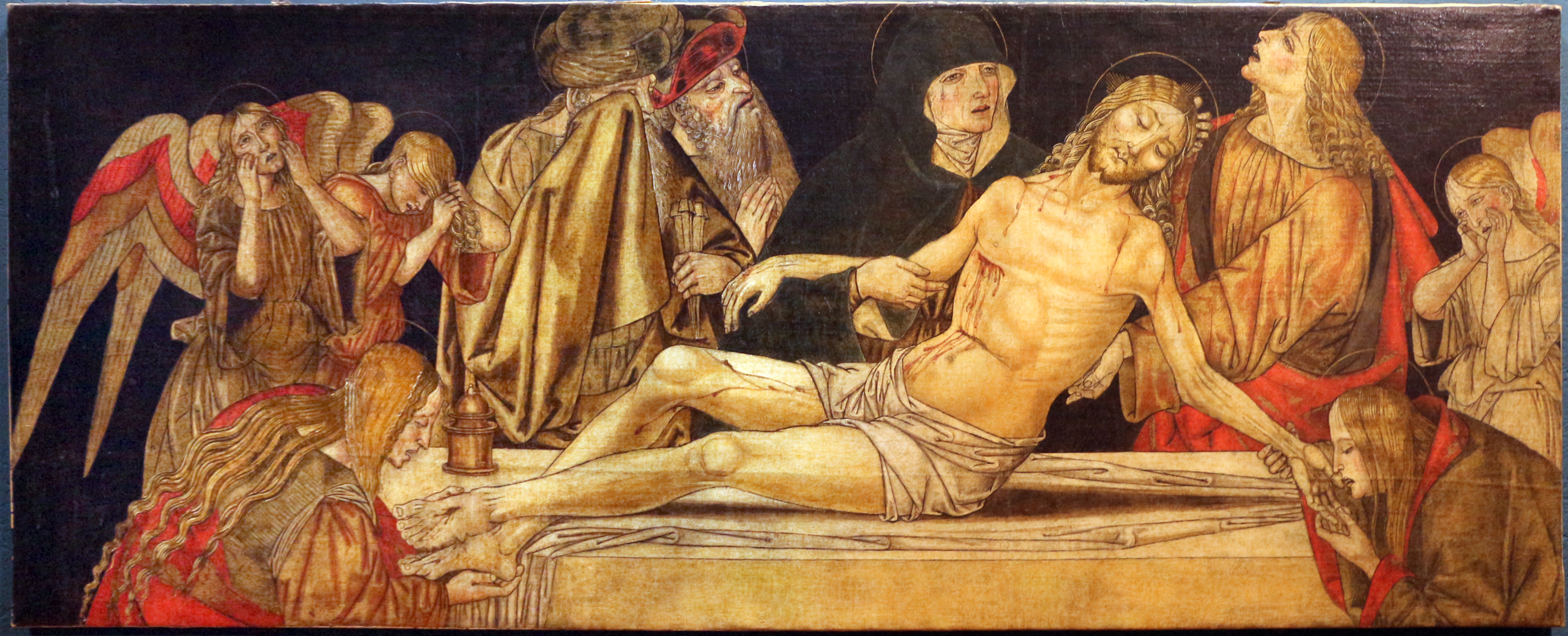
Descent, 1502–06

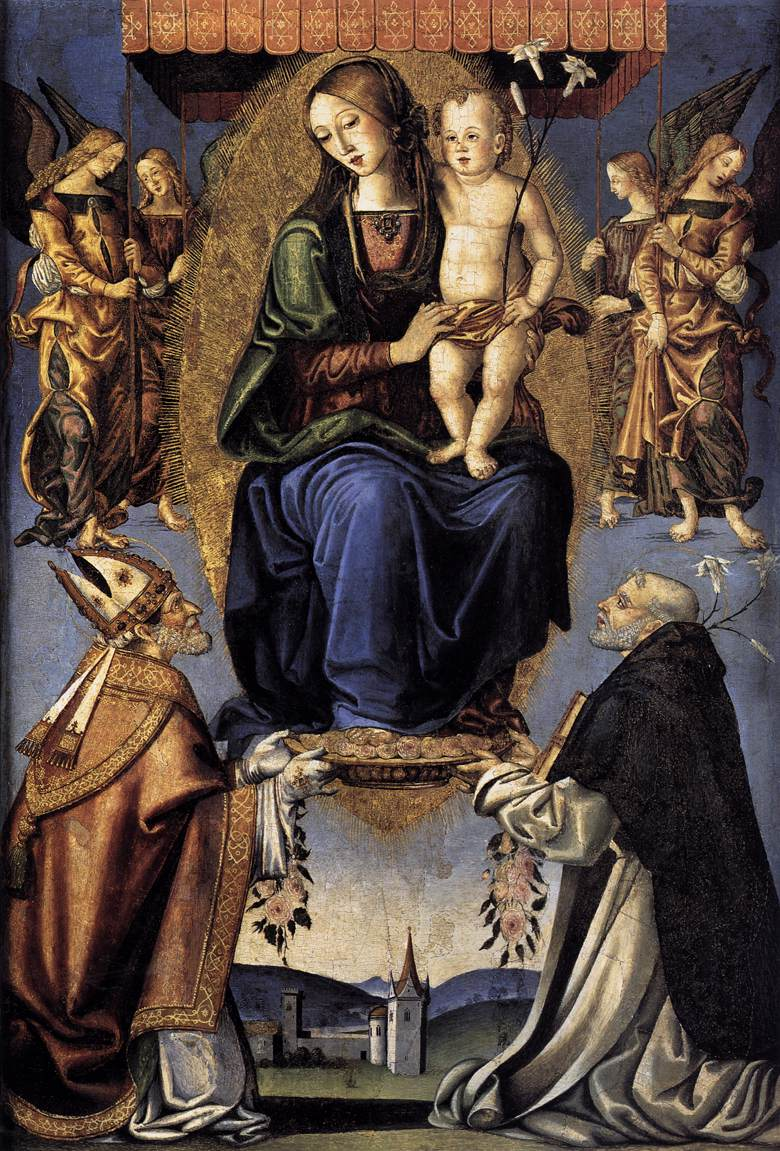
Madonna and Child with Saints Severino and Dominic, 1512

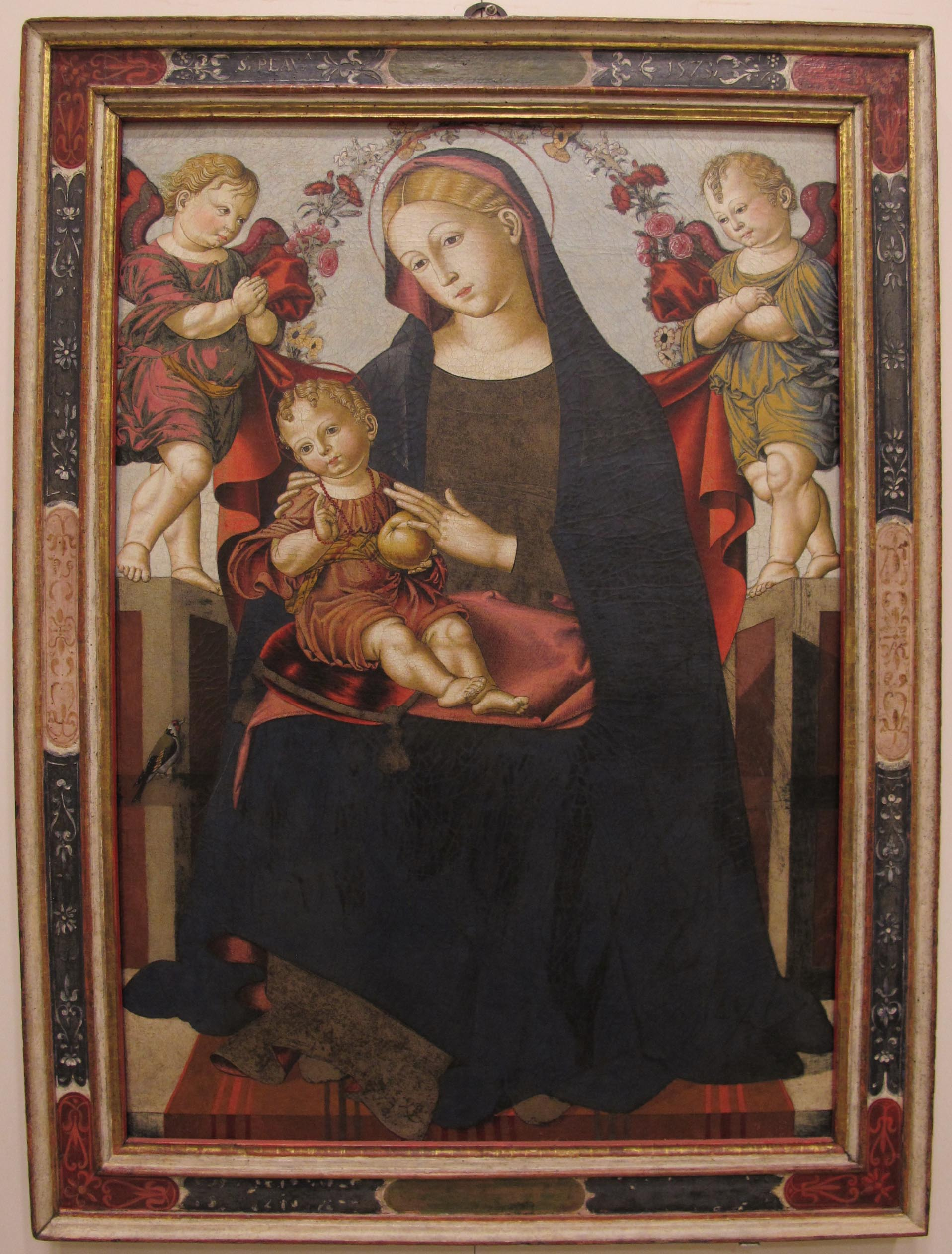
Madonna and Child Enthroned and Angels, circa 1550

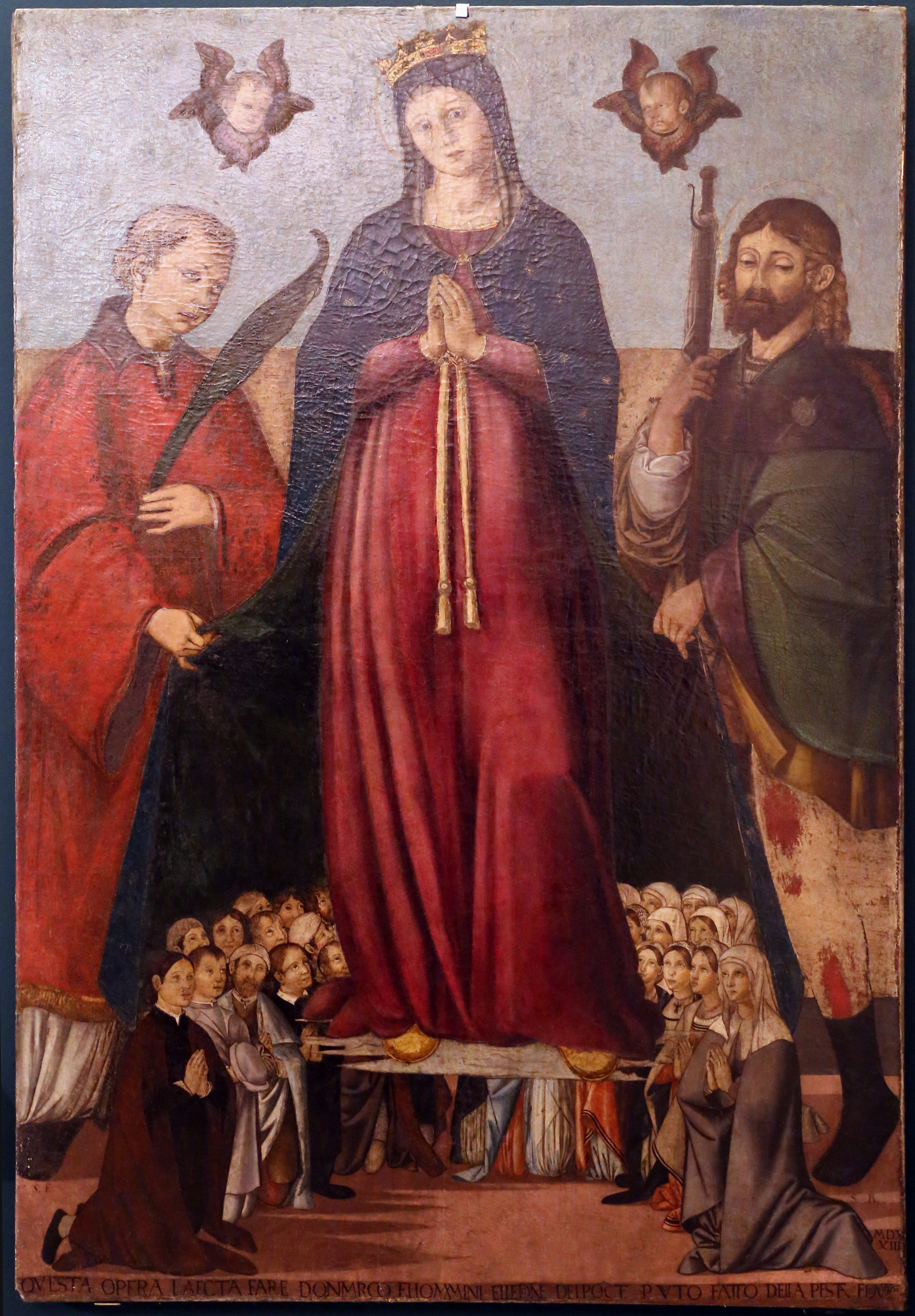
Our Lady of Mercy among the Saints Felicissimo and Rocco, 1522

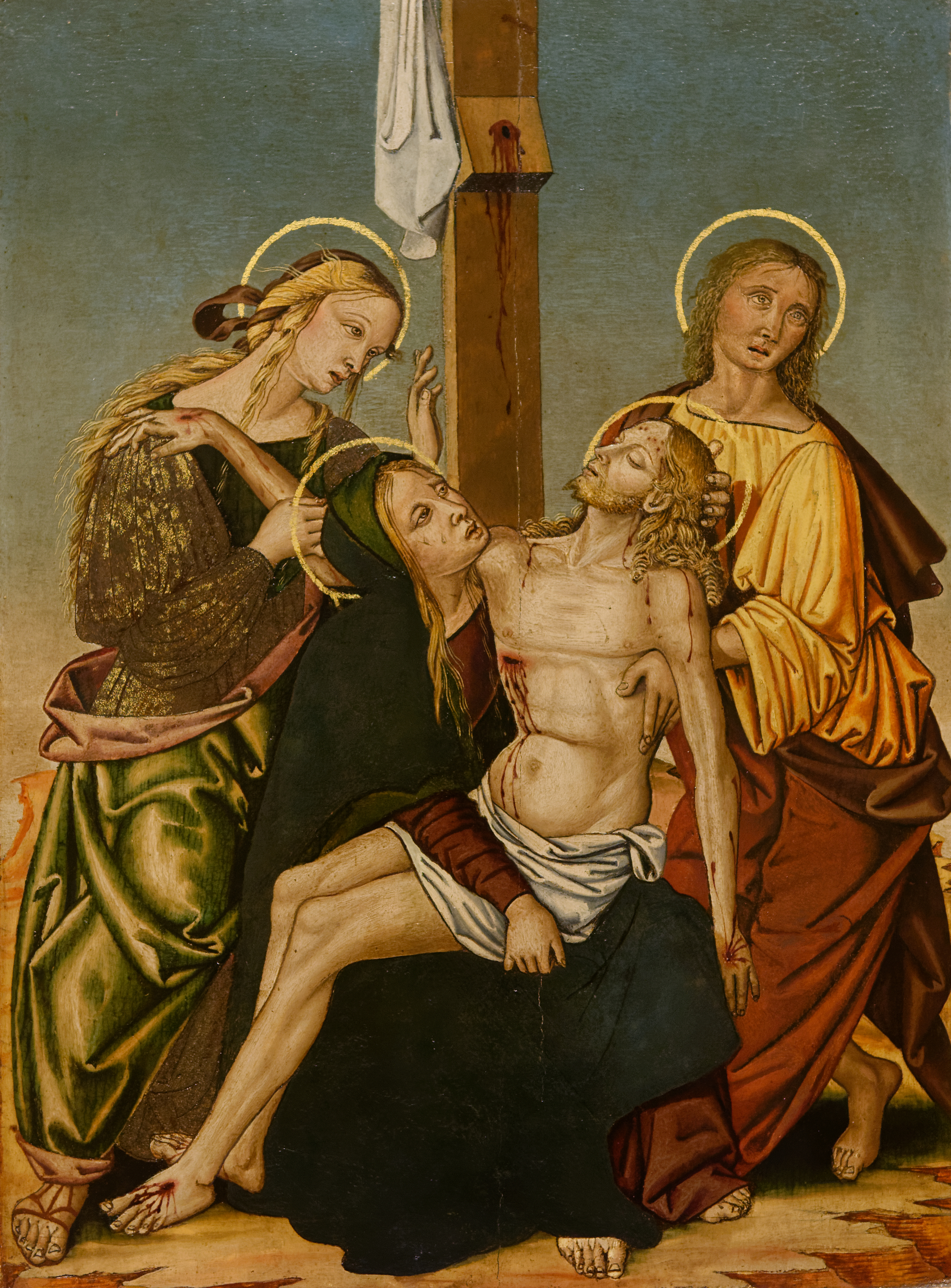
Lamentation over the Dead Christ, circa 1510
