= Still Life (Winman novel) =

2021 novel by Sarah Winman

Still Life is a 2021 novel by Sarah Winman, set in London, England and Florence, Italy.

It was a Sunday Times bestseller, BBC "Between the Covers" pick and a BBC Radio 4 "Book at Bedtime" selection.

Winman won the £10,000 inaugural InWords Literary Award, given to 'a novel published in English or a writer's body of work'.

Themes include art history, the ongoing impact of World War II, chosen families and the 1966 flood of the River Arno in Florence.

== References to other works ==
Characters quote from Baedeker's Guide to Florence. E. M. Forster's 1908 novel, A Room with a View. Forster appears as a character in the book.

Artworks discussed include The Deposition from the Cross (Pontormo).
