= William Kowalski =

American novelist

- Born: William John Kowalski III; August 3, 1970 (age 56); Parma, Ohio, U.S.
- Education: St. John's College
- Occupations: Novelist; screenwriter
- Spouse: Alexandra Nedergaard
- Children: 2
- Parent(s): William John Kowalski Jr. Kathleen Emily Siepel
- Website: williamkowalski.com

William John Kowalski III (born August 3, 1970) is an American-Canadian novelist and screenwriter best known for his debut novel Eddie’s Bastard (1999). Other literary works include Somewhere South of Here, The Adventures of Flash Jackson, The Good Neighbor, and The Hundred Hearts, which won the Thomas Raddall Atlantic Fiction Award. Kowalski has also written several short novels for adult literacy programs. His work has been translated into over a dozen languages.

== Biography ==
Kowalski is the eldest child of Dr. William John Kowalski Jr. of Buffalo, N.Y. (born 1942) and Kathleen Emily Siepel of Angola, N.Y. (b. 1942). In 1974, the family moved to Erie, Pennsylvania. He attended Erie Day School from 1976 to 1984, Cathedral Preparatory School for Boys from 1984 to 1985, and McDowell High School from 1985 to 1988, where he played bass in the rock group Gideon Winter, which was named after a major character in the novel Floating Dragon by Peter Straub. He also acted in numerous high school and community theater productions. In 1988, Kowalski attended the Mercyhurst College Summer Writers' Institute, where he studied under Dr. Ken Schiff (founder of the institute) and W.S. "Jack" Kuniczak (novelist and noted translator of Sienkiewicz). He enrolled at Boston's Emerson College in 1988 to study creative writing but left in 1989, later stating that he felt he needed more life experience before continuing to write seriously. Kowalski later explained his reasoning in an interview, expressing concern that too much focus on formal training could limit meaningful content in writing:

We have far too many writers in America these days who are expert stylists but who really aren't writing about anything. They can write like hell, but they don't have much to say, because they haven't done anything except study writing. As soon as I realized I was in danger of having this happen to me, I dropped out of college... Life makes writers-nothing else does.

As a result, he took a year off from school and worked at two now-defunct Boston bookstores, Avenue Victor Hugo and Globe Corner Bookstore.

In 1990, Kowalski matriculated at St. John's College in Santa Fe, New Mexico, a four-year program whose curriculum consists of the "Great Books" of Western Civilization, including not only literature, but also philosophy, mathematics, the sciences, music and art. He believes this program made him "more well-rounded, and as a result, a more interesting person".

Kowalski has stated that his literary influences include Ernest Hemingway and John Irving, Spanish-language authors Isabel Allende and Gabriel García Márquez, and more populist authors like spy writer John le Carré, southwestern author Tony Hillerman and sea-story writer Patrick O'Brian.

== Literary career ==
Kowalski is the author of five works of literary fiction. Eddie's Bastard (1999), Somewhere South of Here (2001), The Adventures of Flash Jackson (2003), and The Good Neighbor (2004) were all published in the U.S. by HarperCollins and in the United Kingdom by Transworld/Doubleday/Black Swan. The Hundred Hearts (2013) was published by Thomas Allen Publishers (now Dundurn) in Canada, and was subsequently published in German by Eichborn/Luebbe in 2015.

Kowalski also writes shorter books for adults with literacy challenges, called Rapid Reads. These are published by Orca Books' Raven imprint. These are The Barrio Kings (April 2010), The Way It Works (2010), Something Noble (March 2012), Just Gone (September 2013), and The Innocence Device (September 2014). Something Noble, a novel about redemption in a neighborhood blighted by gang violence, has been translated into Swedish and Korean.

Kowalski's work has been translated into over a dozen languages and has appeared on bestseller lists around the world, including The Times of London.

=== Eddie's Bastard ===
In his New York Times review of Eddie's Bastard, William J. Cobb complemented Kowalski for his style and exuberance but faulted him for making the novel both sentimental and anachronistic. Los Angeles Times reviewer Mark Rozzo was more impressed, rejecting the charge of sentimentality and praising the work for its "enviably gentle pacing," "unflappable good nature" and "honeyed glow".

The novel earned Kowalski a place in the Barnes & Noble Discover Great New Writers program in 1999 and won the 2001 Exclusive Books Boeke Prize, putting his novel in the company of such other well-known novels as Midnight in the Garden of Good and Evil, The Poisonwood Bible, Life of Pi, The Kite Runner and The Girl with the Dragon Tattoo.

His sequel to Eddie's Bastard, Somewhere South of Here, was described by Elizabeth Judd as being confident and entertaining in the Kerouac mold, noting Kowalski's "talent for casual invention" and "bravado," even though it never reaches the "deeper truths" of its own story.

=== Other awards ===
- 2003: The Adventures of Flash Jackson: Literary Guild Alternate Selection.
- 2011: The Barrio Kings: Golden Oak Award nomination from the Ontario Library Association.
- 2014: Something Noble: Golden Oak Award nomination from the Ontario Library Association.
- 2014: The Hundred Hearts: Thomas Raddall Atlantic Fiction Award winner from the Writers' Federation of Nova Scotia

In addition to the above literary accolades, Kowalski has one screenwriting credit, "Coyote Beach".

== Personal life ==
Kowalski is married to Alexandra Nedergaard (b. 1968) of Toronto, Ontario. They have two children.
