= Exclusive Books =

Bookseller chain in South Africa

Exclusive Books Group (Pty) Ltd
- Company type: Private
- Industry: Bookselling
- Founded: 1951; 75 years ago
- Founder: Philip Joseph; Pamela Joseph; Pauline Joseph
- Headquarters: Johannesburg, South Africa
- Number of locations: 45+ (2025)
- Area served: South Africa; Botswana; Namibia
- Key people: David Vinokur (Chairman); Grattan Kirk (CEO)
- Products: Books, Boardgames
- Website: exclusivebooks.co.za

Exclusive Books is one of South Africa's largest bookselling chains with stores throughout South Africa, as well as one in Botswana and one in Namibia.

As of 1 December 2013, the chain is owned and operated by a private group of investors. It was previously owned by the Times Media Group (TMG), after TMG took control of Avusa.

== History ==
In 1951, Pam Joseph, in partnership with Philip Joseph's mother, Pauline, purchased a small second-hand bookshop in the centre of Johannesburg and renamed it Exclusive Books.

Philip Joseph expanded the business by setting up a further branch in 1954 in Hillbrow, then one of the most densely populated areas in the world. The bookstore offered late night and Sunday trading, contributing to its growth. The Hillbrow store closed in 1993, and within the same year, the Hyde Park store became the group's flagship. It was the largest bookshop of its kind in Southern Africa at the time.

In 1998, it launched the Fanatics loyalty program, which grew to a membership of 170,000 members by 2001. In 1999, Exclusive Books introduced Seattle Coffee Company cafés adjoining eighteen of the book stores.

Until 2012, they sponsored an annual book prize called the Exclusive Books Boeke Prize.

On 22 September 2013, it was announced that Exclusive Books, and its sister company Van Schaik Bookstore, were being sold by TMG to a private consortium led by Medu Capital, for a total of R435 million.

At the conclusion of the sale, the company briefly traded under the name Jadeite Trading (Pty) Ltd Trading As Exclusive Books, before being re-registered as Exclusive Books Group (Pty) Ltd. On 21 August 2014, the company announced its new brand and a shift in its corporate focus, including the introduction of its own café brand, EB Café.

In July 2017, Market Theatre Foundation partnered with Exclusive Books.

In June 2020, Exclusive Books announced that it would host all then-upcoming book launches online via Zoom, to comply with COVID-19 regulations.

== Corporate social responsibility ==
In 2002, in a move to formalize the corporate social responsibility programme, Exclusive Books established the Exclusive Books Reading Trust. The three trustees are Zakes Mda, Mandla Langa, and Brian Wafawarowa.

The Reading Trust was established to fund literacy, library and reading projects around South Africa. Through the Reading Trust Exclusive Books has opened libraries in Cape Town and Limpopo and has donated thousands of books every year to various organizations and charities.

== E-commerce ==
The first Exclusive Books e-commerce site was launched as "exclusivebooks.com" and went live in 1999. In 2010, this was replaced by "exclus1ves.co.za", which was one of the first e-commerce sites in South Africa to incorporate gamification. The company now operates its e-commerce store as "exclusivebooks.co.za".
