= Descent from the Cross =

Artistic depiction of the biblical scene

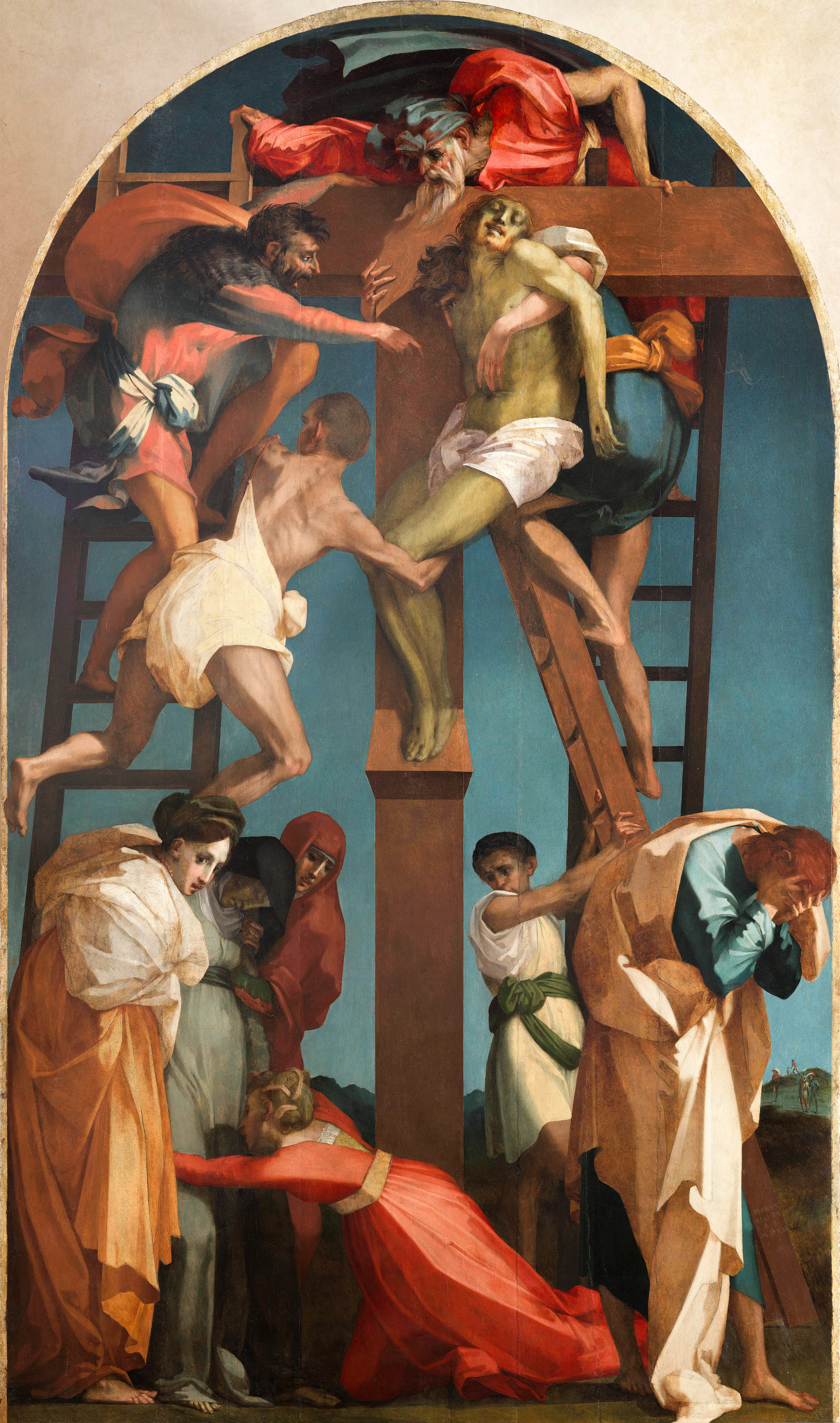
Rosso Fiorentino, Descent from the Cross (1521). Oil on wood. 375 × 196 cm. Pinacoteca Comunale di Volterra, Italy

The Descent from the Cross (Greek: Ἀποκαθήλωσις, Apokathelosis), or Deposition of Christ, is the scene, as depicted in art, from the Gospels' accounts of Joseph of Arimathea and Nicodemus taking Christ down from the cross after his crucifixion (John 19, John 19:38–42). The subject became popular in Byzantine art in the 9th century, and in the West from the 10th century. The Descent from the Cross is the thirteenth Station of the Cross, and is also the sixth of the Seven Sorrows of the Blessed Virgin Mary.

Other figures not mentioned in the Gospels who are often included in depictions of this subject include John the Evangelist, who is sometimes depicted supporting a fainting Mary (as in the work below by Rogier van der Weyden), and Mary Magdalene. The Gospels mention an undefined number of women as watching the crucifixion, including the Three Marys, (Mary Salome being mentioned in Mark 15 (Mark 15:40)), and also that the Virgin Mary and Mary Magdalene saw the burial (Mark 15:47). These and further women and unnamed male helpers are often shown.

== Development of the image ==
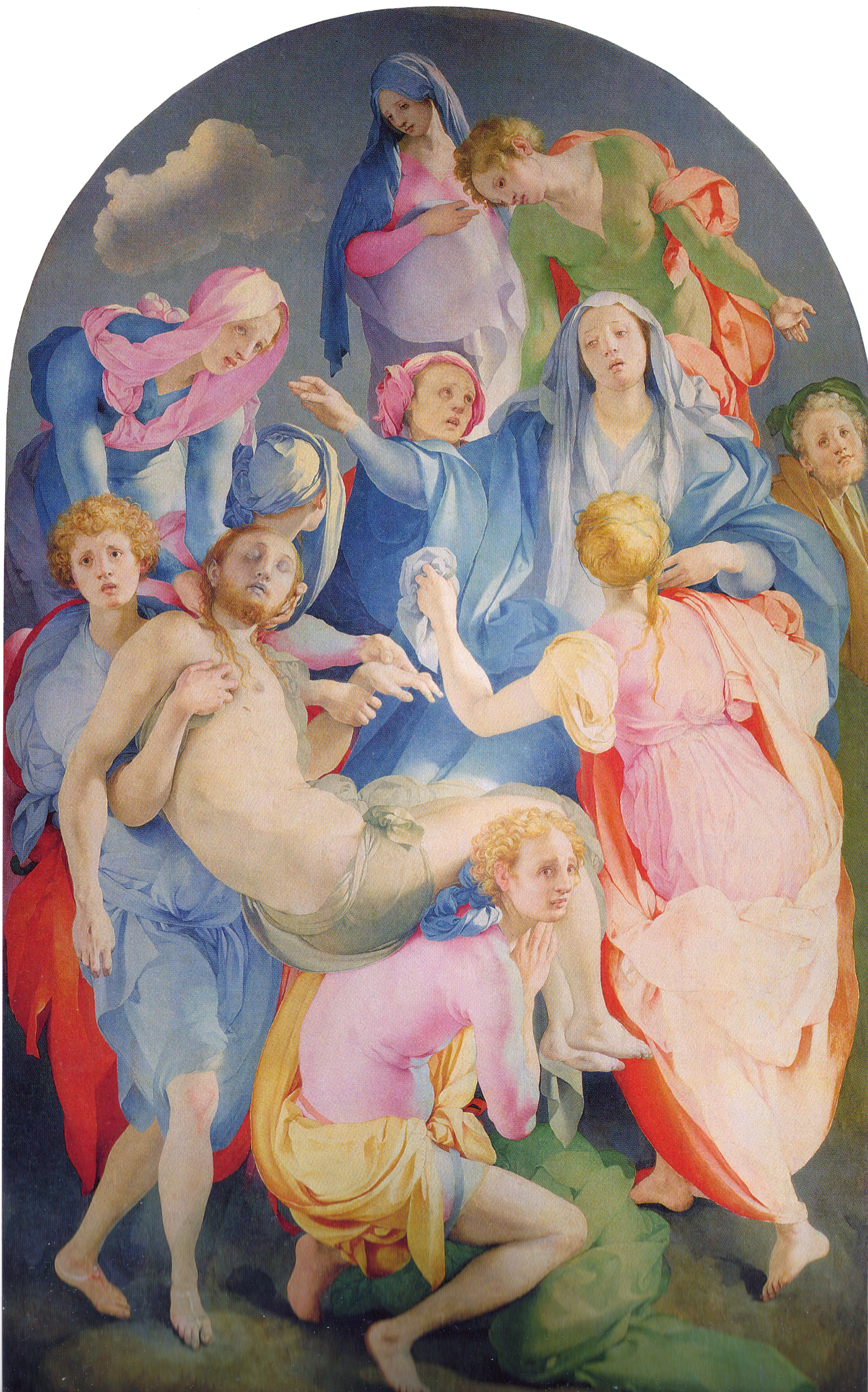
Pontormo, The Descent from the Cross (1525–1528).

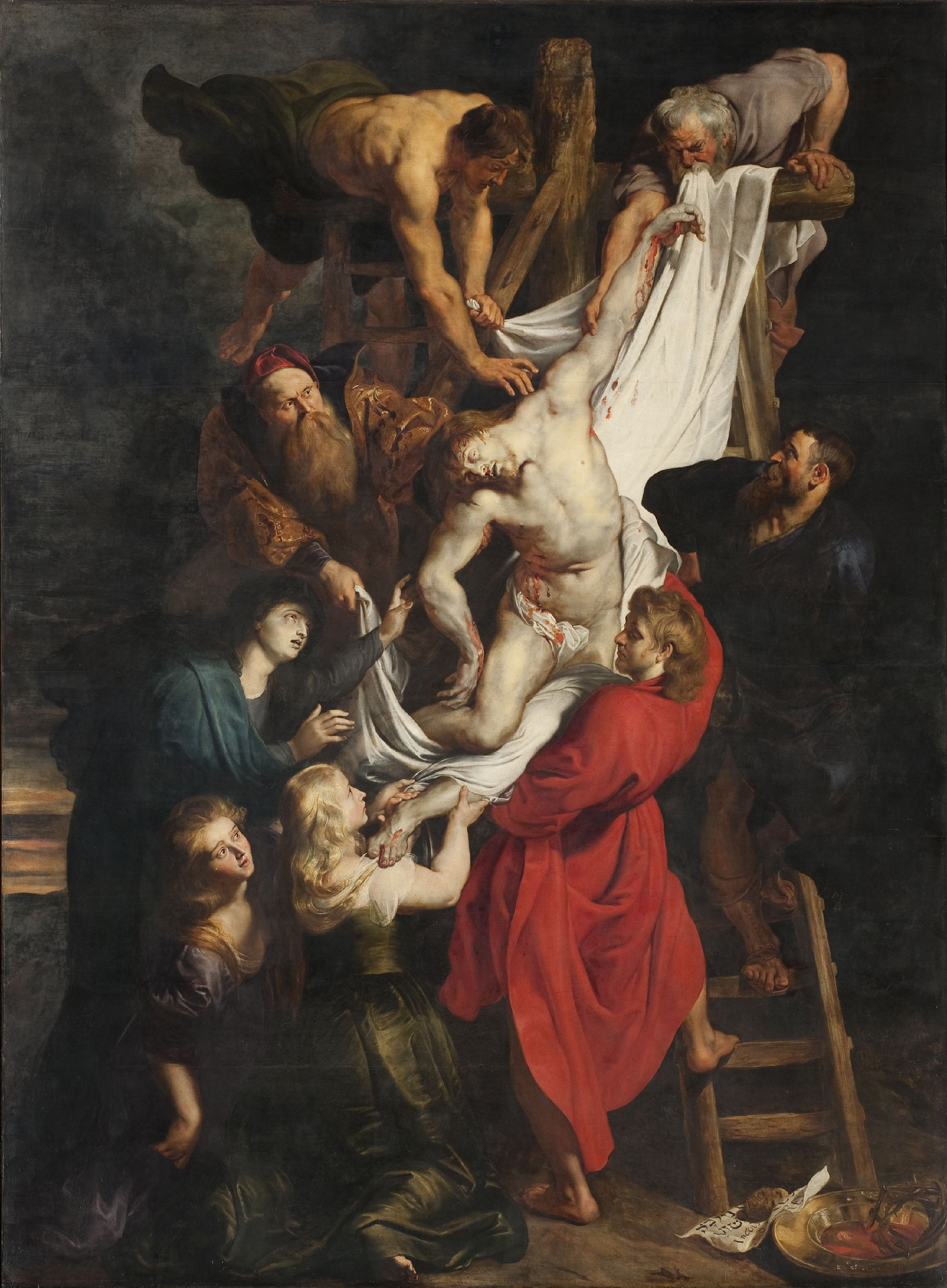
Peter Paul Rubens, The Descent from the Cross (1612–1614)

Even in early depictions the details and posing of the composition, and especially the position of Christ's body, are varied. The scene was usually included in medieval cycles of the Life or the Passion of Christ, between the Crucifixion and the Entombment of Christ. The Lamentation of Christ, or Pietà, showing the body of Christ held by Mary, may intervene between these two, and is common as an individual image, especially in sculpture. The Bearing of the Body, showing Christ's body being carried to his tomb, and the Anointing of Christ's Body, showing the body laid flat on the top of the tomb or a similarly shaped "anointing-stone", are other scenes that may be shown. This last is especially important in Orthodox art, where it is shown on the Epitaphios.

With the Renaissance the subject became popular for altarpieces, partly because of the challenges of the composition, and the suitability of its vertical shape. Rosso Fiorentino's Volterra Deposition is usually regarded as his most important work, and Pontormo's altarpiece of the subject is perhaps his most ambitious work. The subject was painted several times by both Rubens and Rembrandt, the latter of whom repeated one of his paintings (now in Munich) in a large print, his only one to be mainly engraved, as well as making two other etchings of the subject.

== Selected examples ==
- Deposition of Christ (c. 1433) by Fra Angelico, in the National Museum of San Marco, Florence
- Descent from the Cross (c. 1435) by Rogier van der Weyden, in the Museo del Prado, Madrid
- Deposition from the Cross, Filippino Lippi, completed circa 1506, by Pietro Perugino, in the Galleria dell'Accademia, Florence
- Deposition from the Cross (1521) by Rosso Fiorentino in the Pinacoteca of Volterra
- Deposition from the Cross (1528) by Pontormo at the Capponi Chapel of church of Santa Felicita, Florence
- Deposition of Christ (1545) by Bronzino in the Palazzo Vecchio, Florence
- The Descent from the Cross (1612–1614), by Peter Paul Rubens, at the Cathedral of Our Lady, Antwerp
- The Descent from the Cross (1995–1996), by David Folley, now at the Jesus Chapel, St Andrew's Church, Wickford, Essex

== Gallery ==
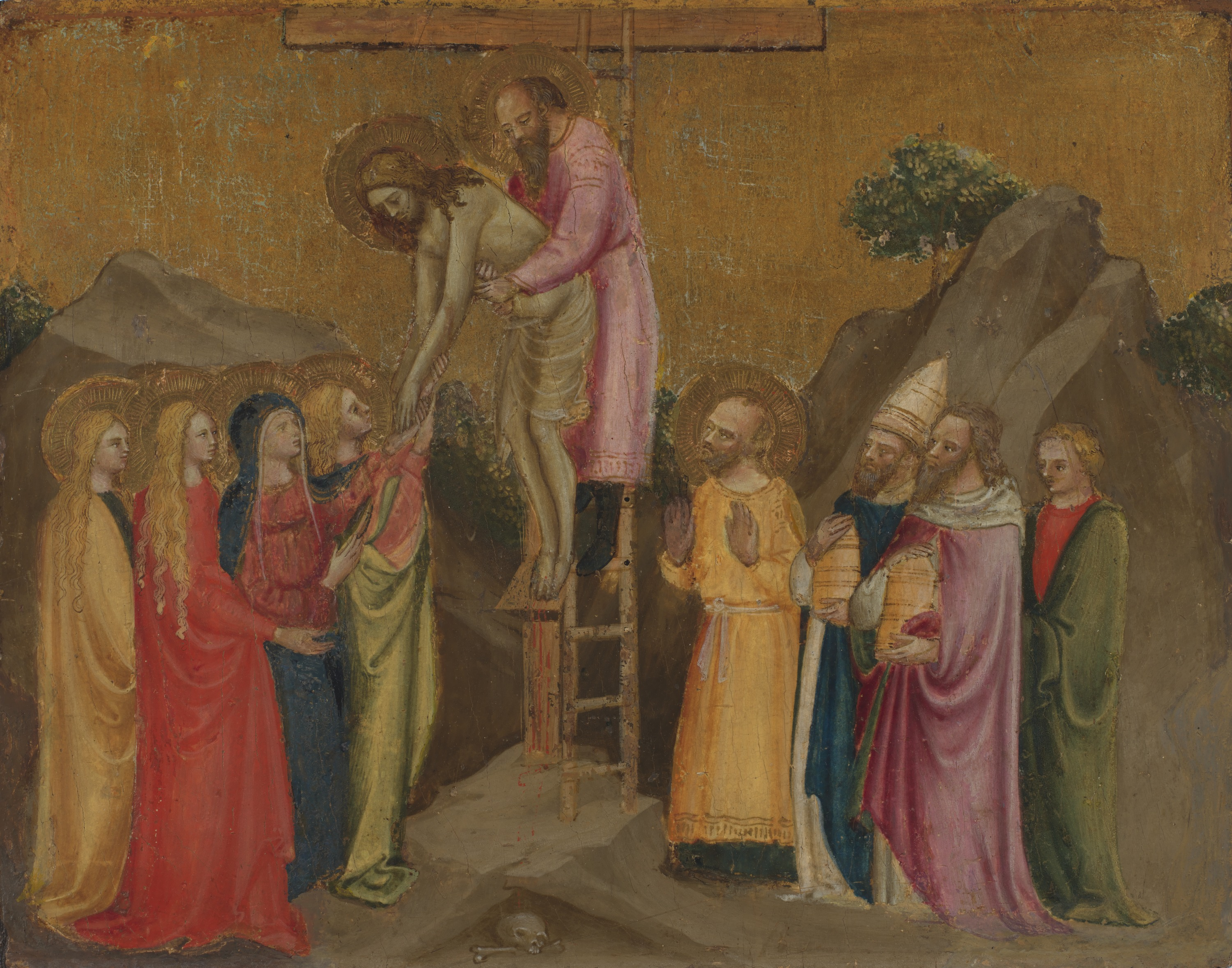
Descent from the Cross, 14th century, oil on wood, Italy

Descent from the Cross. Armenian manuscript. Daniel of Uranc gospel, 1463.

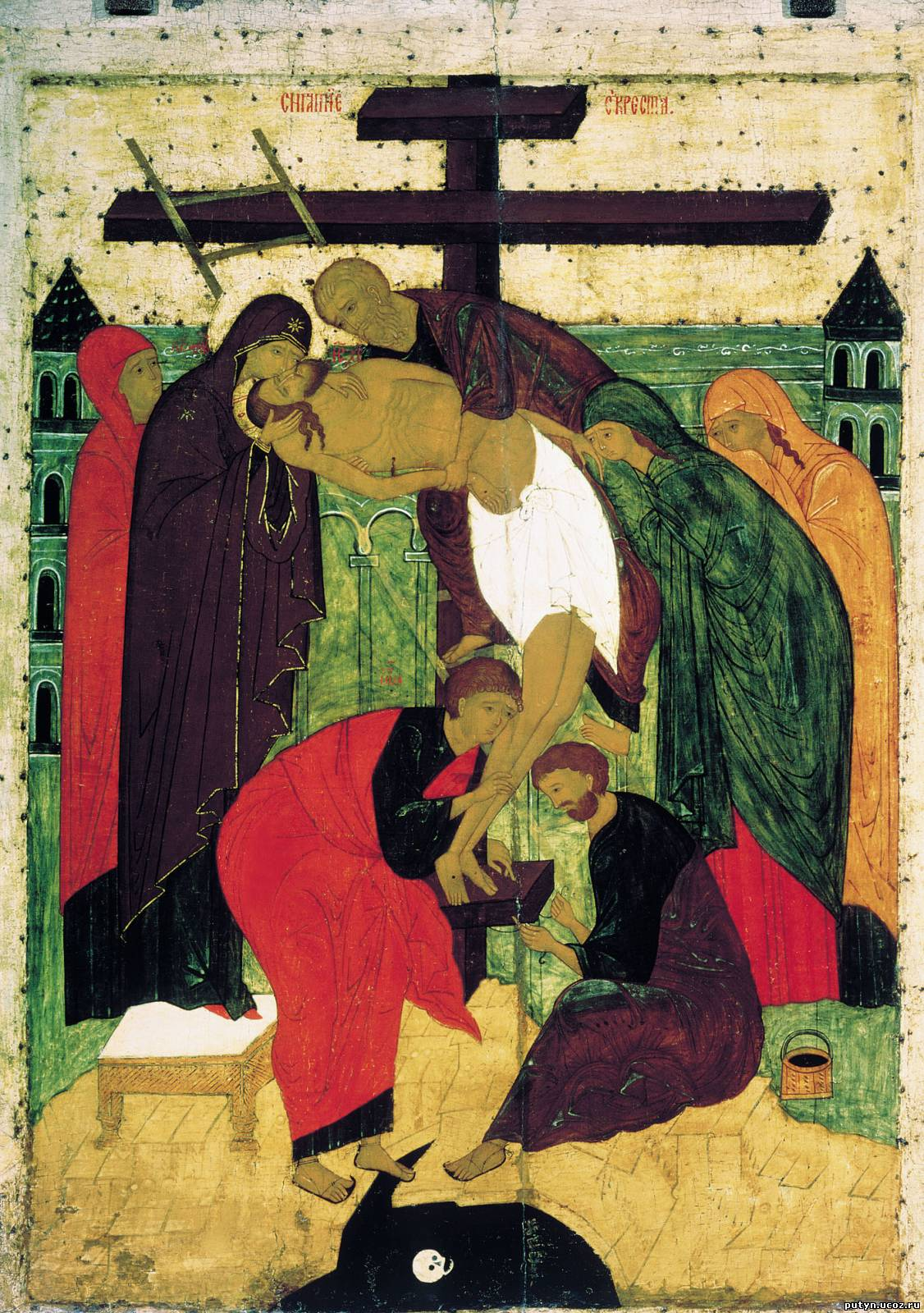
Descent from the Cross, 15th century icon

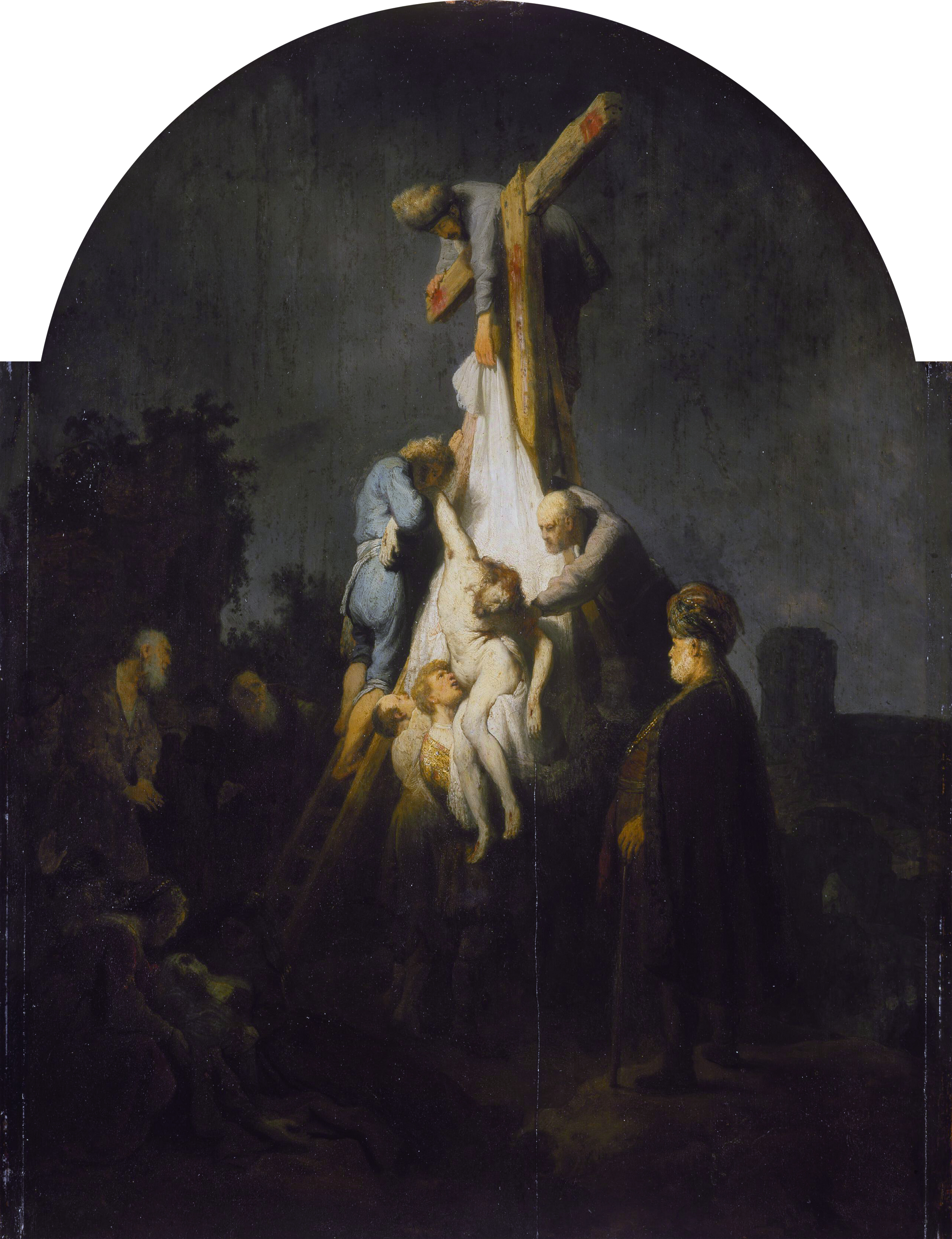
Rembrandt, The Descent from the Cross (1633)

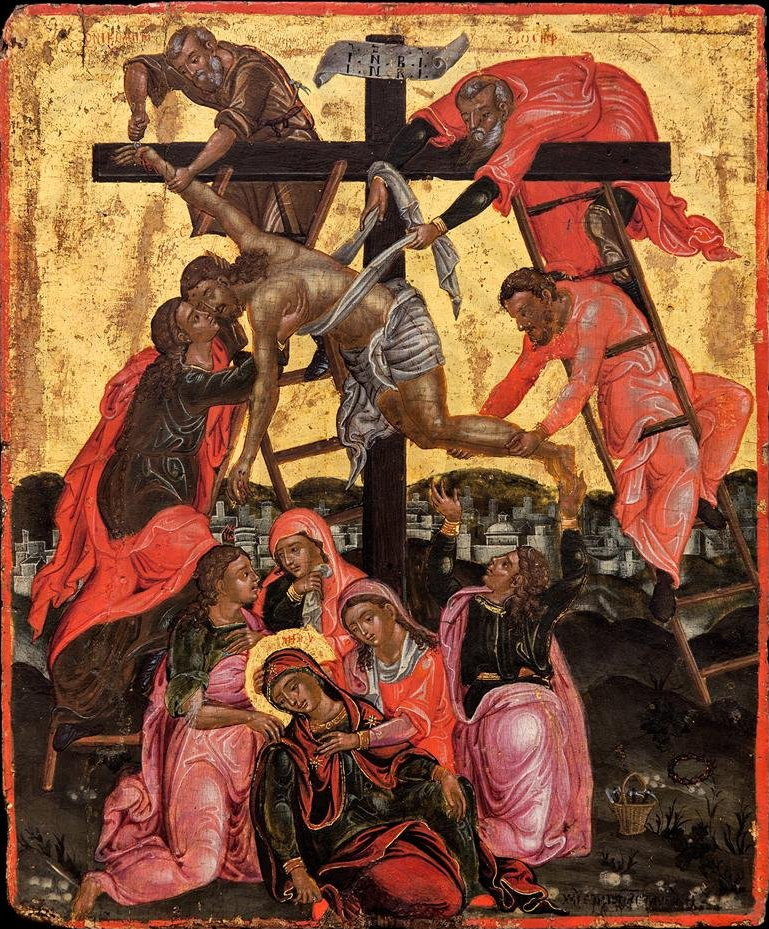
Stylianos Stavrakis, Descent from the Cross (1729–1786)

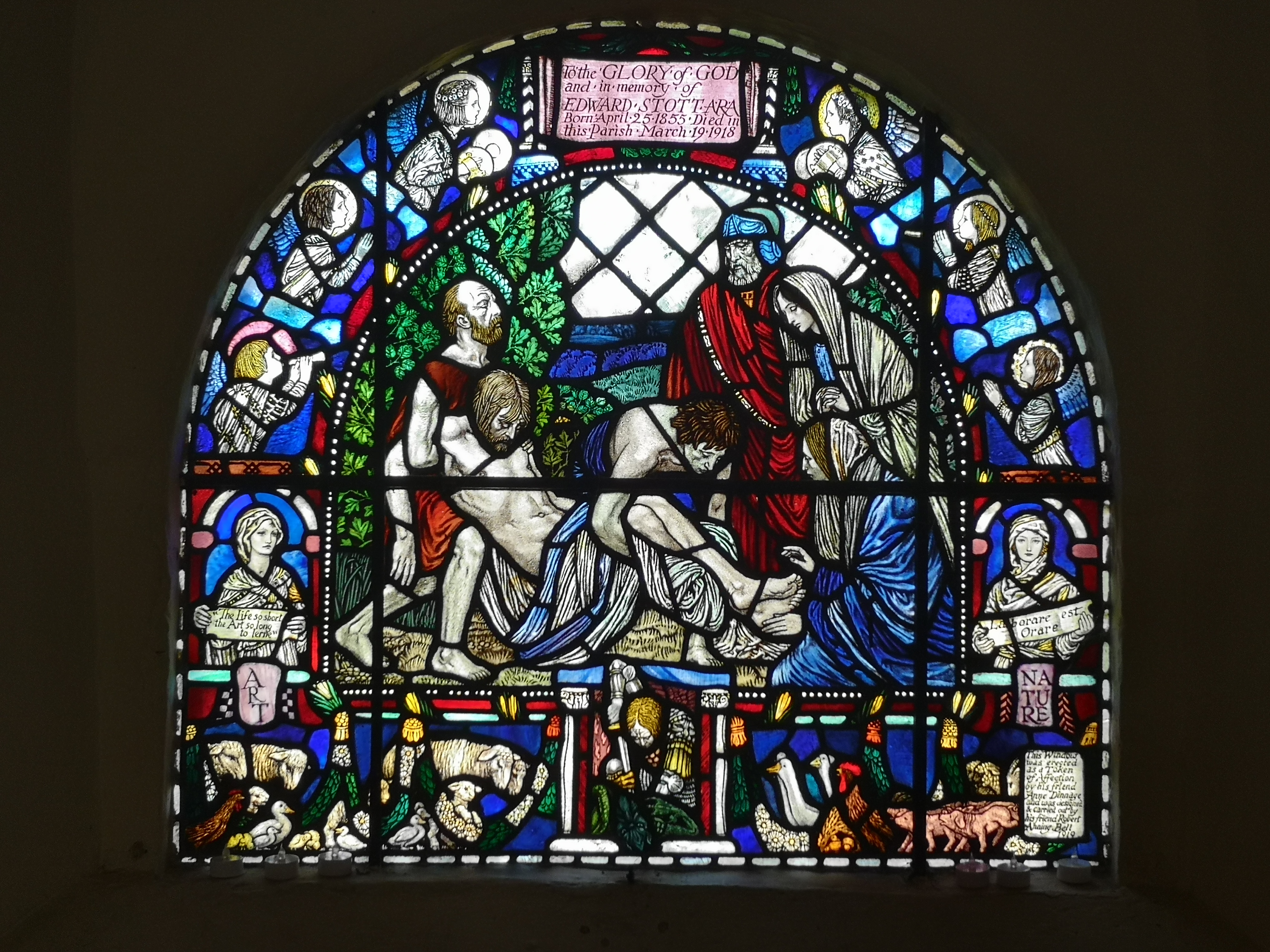
Edward Stott Memorial Window by Robert Anning Bell (1919)

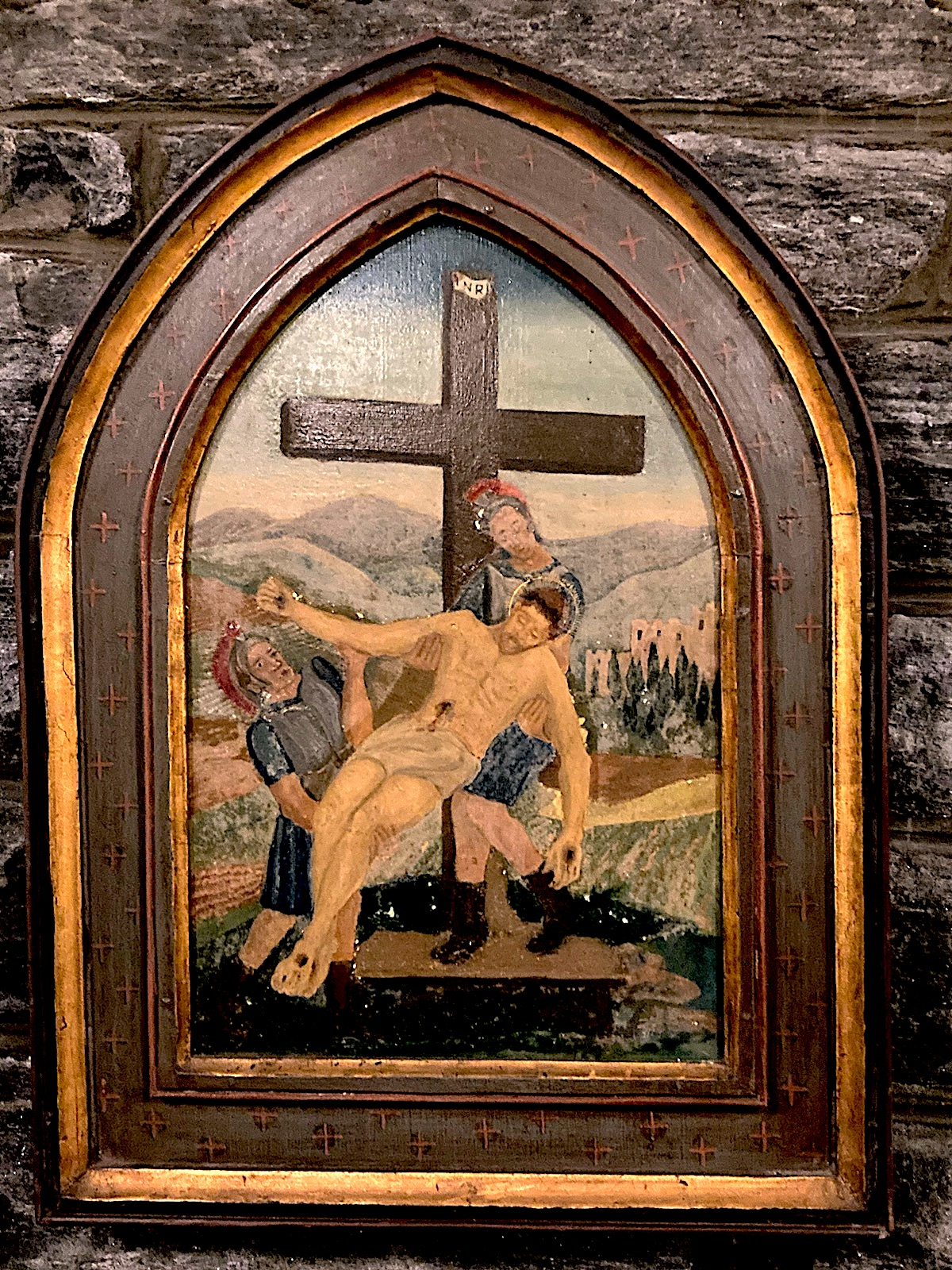
Descent from the Cross, by Constance LaBoiteaux Drake (1962), Church of the Good Shepherd (Rosemont, Pennsylvania)

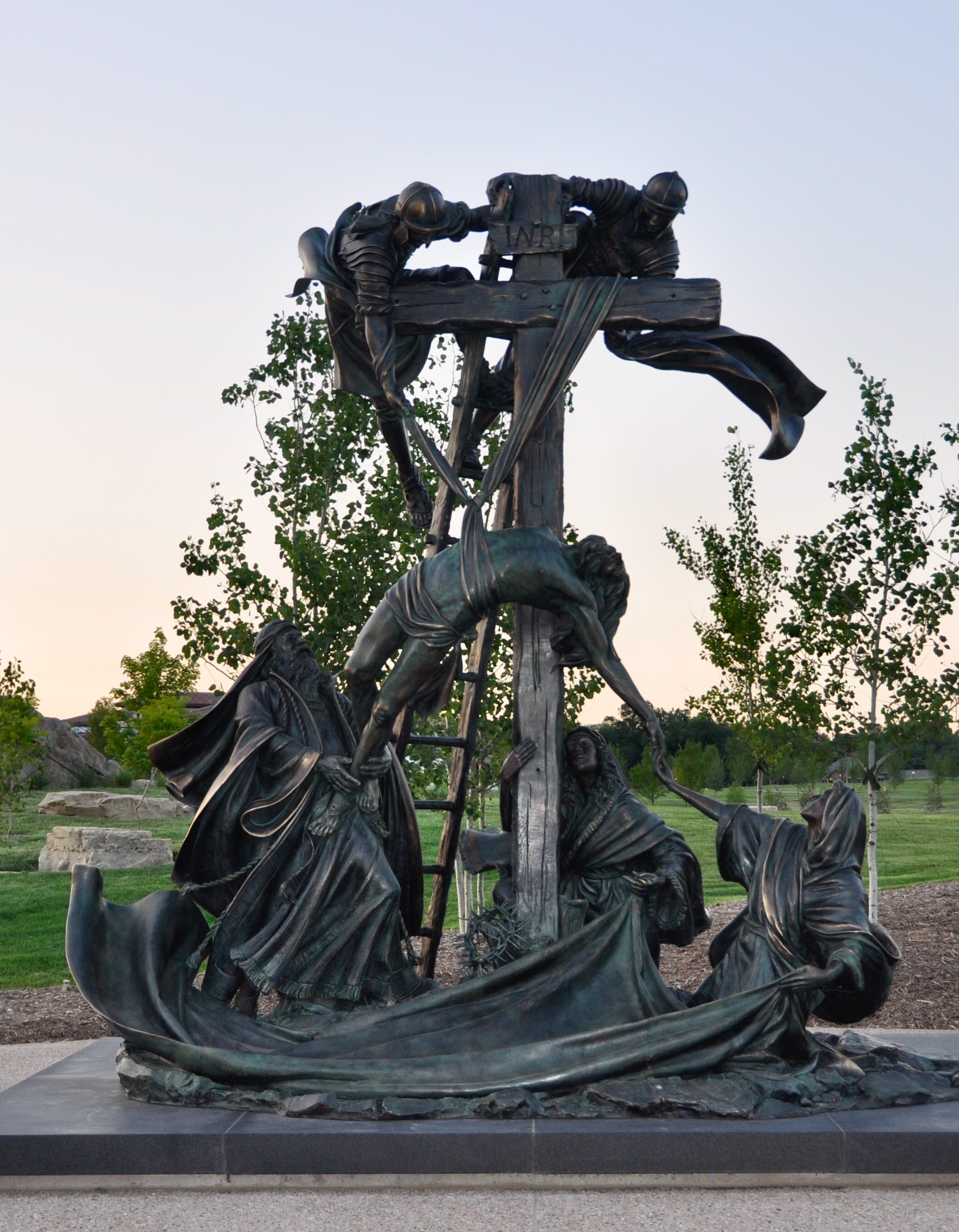
Bronze sculpture by Lundeen Sculpture, Cloisters on the Platte near Omaha, Nebraska (2018)

== See also ==
- Antimension
- Epitaphios (liturgical)
- Life of Jesus in the New Testament
- Seven Sorrows of Mary
- Pietà
