= When God Was a Rabbit =

2011 novel by Sarah Winman

- First edition (Headline)
- Author: Sarah Winman
- Language: English
- Publisher: Headline Publishing Group
- Publication date: 2011
- LC Class: PR6123.I5743 W56

When God Was a Rabbit is a book by Sarah Winman that was first published in 2011. It won Winman various awards including New Writer of the Year in the Galaxy National Book Awards and was one of the books chosen by Richard & Judy in their 2011 Summer Book Club.

== Synopsis ==
When God Was a Rabbit follows the life of a young girl – Eleanor Maud (Elly for short) – as she grows up first in Essex, then Cornwall and the various characters she meets and befriends along the way. The book is named after God, a pet rabbit given to Elly by her brother who is a constant companion during her childhood. Overall it is a story about love in all its forms, surrounding the central characters, Elly, her brother and their extended circle of family and friends.

== Awards ==
- New Writer of the Year in the Galaxy National Book Awards (United Kingdom), 2011
- Newton First Book Award in the Edinburgh International Book Festival (United Kingdom), 2011
- Waterstones 11 (United Kingdom), 2011
- The Exclusive Books Boeke Prize (South Africa), 2011

== Reviews ==
- Claudia FitzHerbert: Triumph and disaster, The Spectator, 19 March 2011
- Anthony Cummins: Fiction in Brief, The Telegraph, 28 March 2011
- Richard Madeley and Judy Finnigan: Review: When God Was a Rabbit, Summer 2011
- David Hebblethwaite: Book Review Sarah Winman, The Huffington Post, 14 December 2011

== Edition ==
- Sarah Winman: When God Was a Rabbit (Headline Review: London, 2011) (ISBN 9780755379286).
