= Ludovico di Angelo Mattioli =

Italian painter

Ludovico or Lodovico di Angelo Mattioli (active 1481 – 1525) was an Italian painter of the early-Renaissance period.

== Biography ==
He was active in Perugia and is best known for training Bernardino di Mariotto. He appears to have been possibly contemporaneous with Fiorenzo di Lorenzo. He painted an altarpiece in 1488 for the Oratory of Santi Simone e Fiorenzo, later found just outside the chapel of San Anello in the Duomo of Perugia.
