= The Descent from the Cross (David Folley) =

Painting by David Folley

The Descent From The Cross
- Artist: David Folley
- Year: 1995–96
- Catalogue: 7CC01A
- Type: Mixed media on canvas
- Dimensions: 2.1 m × 2.4 m (6 ft 11 in × 7 ft 10 in)

The Descent from the Cross by David Folley was commissioned by Rev. Raymond Chudley to mark his retirement in 1996 as team leader of St Andrew's Church, Wickford, Essex.

Over the centuries The Descent from the Cross, or Deposition of Christ or Descent of Christ from the Cross, has been a common subject in Christian art. Famous examples from the old masters include those by Peter Paul Rubens, Rembrandt, Jacopo Pontormo and Rogier van der Weyden whose work influenced Folley's geometric composition.

Folley's homage to Rogier van der Weyden’s masterpiece is a modern interpretation to “inspire the viewer to contemplate the historical, human and mystical elements of the crucifixion”. It was rendered by the painter in response to Rev. Raymond Chudley's request to create a work where the “viewer receives more from it the more he or she looks”.

Folley's controversial commission received a mixed response. The ecclesiastical response to the work was approval; Chudley said, “It is slightly controversial, perhaps, but so dramatic. The viewer receives more from it the more he or she looks.” In his dedication of the work, the Bishop of Bradwell, Right Reverend Laurie Green, explained to the congregation that Folley “has depicted the Descent of the Body of Christ from the Cross like the icons of old” to “meditate and reflect on the scene of utter horror”. In the transcript of the dedication he continues, “We want the brutal truth told but not in a brutal way.” In summing up his dedication the bishop stated: "This was truth seen through the believing eye of the artist […]We should embrace the vision."

Others however found the work to be ‘savage’. On the last visit the painter made to view the work in 2007 he found the painting behind a curtain; as the church warden informed him, “unfortunately, some of our congregation still find the image too painful to look at”.

The commission remit from Chudley was to paint a work which engages, inspires and uplifts the viewer to contemplate the historical and mystical human presence as found in the scene. With this in mind the painter included many Christian iconographic references. Two examples from the painter's private notes: Firstly, in keeping with the fifteenth century tradition, Chudley has been depicted in the role of the doner, kneeling in prayer with his attention transfixed upon the body of Christ. Secondly, the painter has included himself in the painting not as an ego motive but as a reflection of the Horation adage, 'the painter must live through his subjects’ actions so that their depiction is emotionally convincing.'

Chudley was introduced to Folley in 1976 when he was curate-in-charge of the Plymouth parish of Leigham and Glenholt where the painter had a studio. At the time, the painter was painting his version of the crucifixion inspired by Hieronymus Bosch’s The Garden of Earthly Delights. Impressed by the teenager's artistic ability Rev. Chudley asked if he could have the finished work. Unfortunately it was never finished and subsequently destroyed by the painter in 1982.

Twenty years later in 1995, Folley was commissioned to paint a large altar painting depicting Christ's Descent from the Cross. The painting's first public unveiling was on Thursday 28 March 1996 at St. Andrew's Church Plymouth prior to the painting's transportation to Wickford. The Bishop of Bradwell, Laurie Green, unveiled and blessed the work on 5 Ma 1996, at the 09.30am Eucharist.

== Contemporary Commentaries ==
- Peach, Victor, A few thoughts on the significance of the fetus in the Man, Eucharist explanation notes (1996)
- Green, Laurie, transcript for the painting's Dedication at Wickford (1996)
- Thompson, Alan, G., The Descent From The Cross - A Painting By David Folley (2001)
