= H. G. Wells: War with the World =

- Genre: Docudrama
- Directed by: James Kent
- Starring: Michael Sheen; Sally Hawkins; Sarah Winman
- Composer: Nick Powell
- Country of origin: United Kingdom
- Original language: English

Production
- Executive producer: Leanne Klein
- Producers: Colette Flight; Sias Wilson
- Running time: 90 minutes

Original release
- Network: BBC Two
- Release: 30 September 2006

Related
- George Orwell: A Life in Pictures; Agatha Christie: A Life in Pictures; Elizabeth David: A Life in Recipes

H. G. Wells: War with the World is a 2006 BBC Television docudrama telling the life story of the British author H. G. Wells, who is played in the film by Michael Sheen. The title of the film echoes that of one of Wells' best-known novels, The War of the Worlds (1898).

== Plot ==
The film dramatises the story of the author's life, by using H. G. Wells' own words. It tells the story of Wells' transformation from self-confident womaniser, socialist radical and young literary prophet to burdened missionary, dedicated to creating a World State.

== Cast ==
Michael Sheen as H. G. Wells
Sally Hawkins as Rebecca West
Sarah Winman as Jane Wells
Dermot Crowley as George Bernard Shaw
Branka Katic as Moura Budberg
Jacek Koman as Maxim Gorky
Kenneth Jay as Henry James
Michael Cochrane as Minister
Rebecca Ramsden as Millie
Elizabeth Elvin as Mrs. Hallam
Keir Charles as Sykes
Shane Board as Frank Wells
Abigail Davies as Russian Reporter
Roger Heathcott as Josef Stalin
Thomas-James Fisher as Jip Wells
Lady Sara Rönneke as Georgie
Chris Wilson as Reporter Andy Callaghan as Gorky's friend
