= Pacino di Buonaguida =

Italian painter

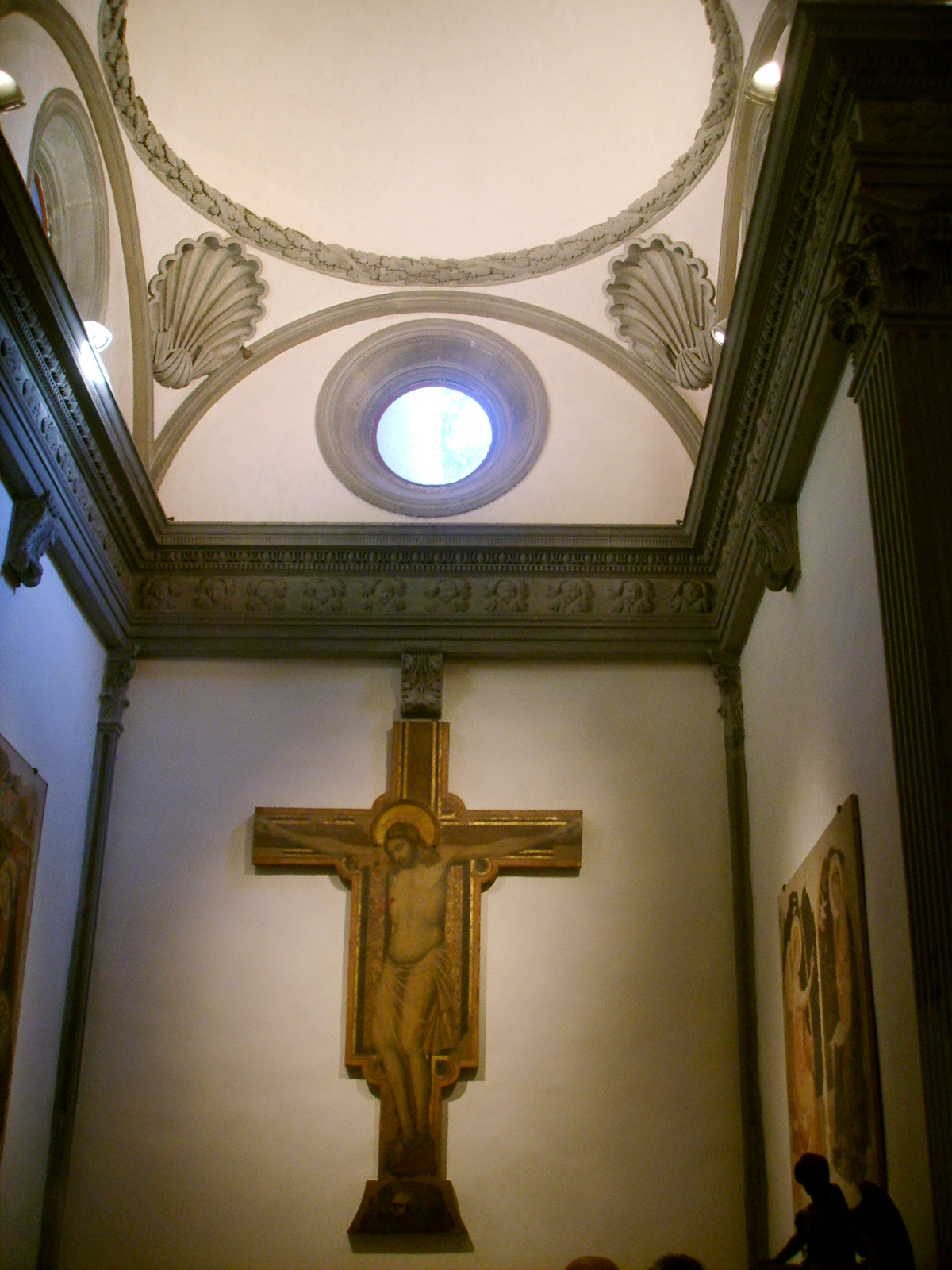
Crucifix by Pacino in the church of Santa Felicità, Florence

Pacino di Buonaguida (active c. 1303 – about 1347) was an Italian painter active in Florence in the Gothic.

Little is known of his biography, and only one work is signed, an altarpiece at the Accademia di Belle Arti in Florence. Scholars now attribute over 50 works to the painter. The Chiarito tabernacle at the Getty Museum in California is attributed to Pacino, and he contributed to an important illuminated manuscript, the Laudario di Sant'Agnese. A complex Tree of Life attributed to Pacino is at the Accademia.
