= The Deposition from the Cross (Pontormo) =

Painting by Pontormo

Deposition from the Cross
- Deposizione (Italian)
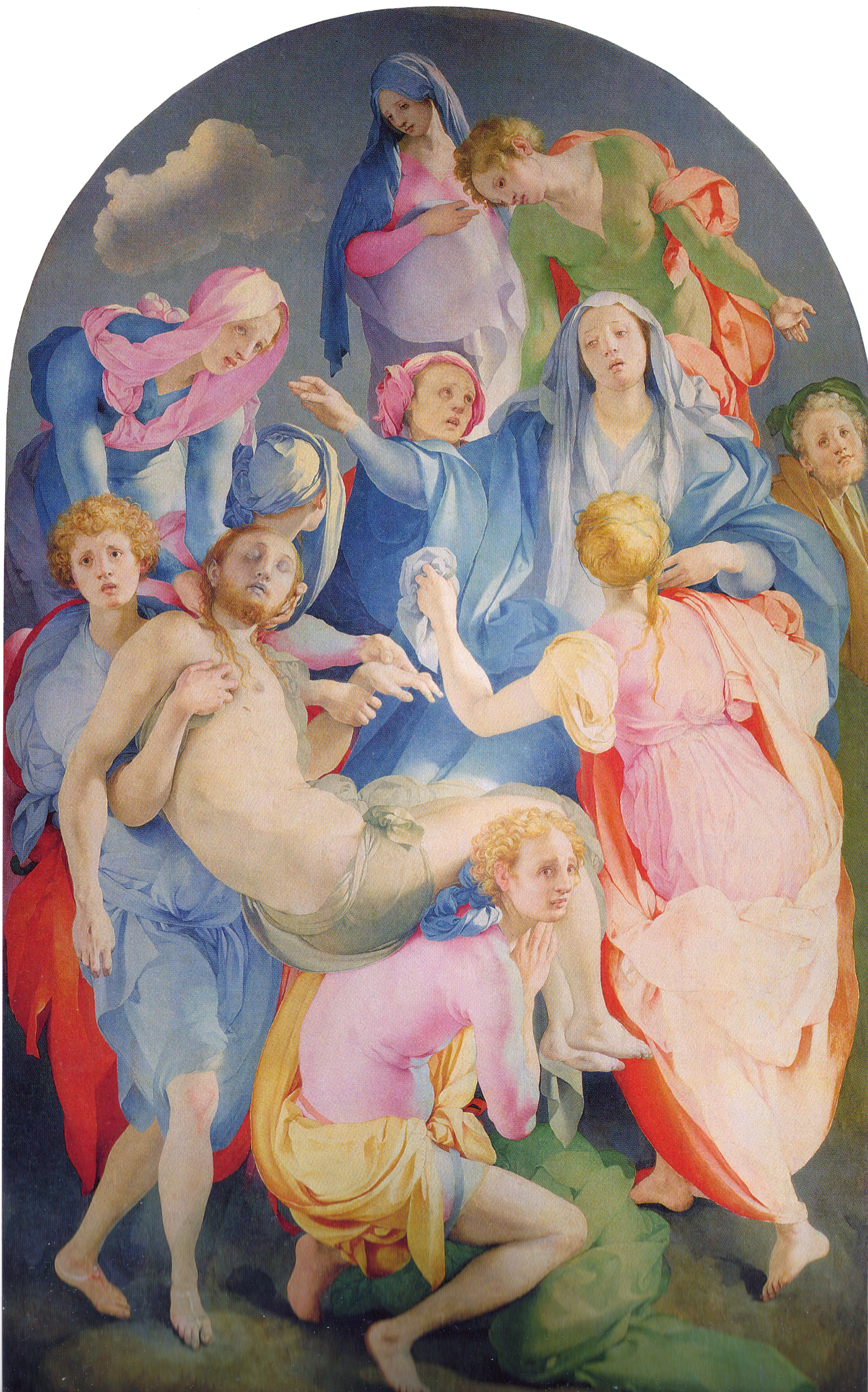
- Artist: Jacopo Pontormo
- Year: c. 1525–1528
- Type: Tempera on wood
- Dimensions: 313 cm × 192 cm (123 in × 76 in)
- Location: Church of Santa Felicita, Florence

The Deposition from the Cross is an altarpiece, completed in 1528, depicting the Deposition of Christ by the Italian Renaissance painter Jacopo Pontormo. It is broadly considered to be the artist's surviving masterpiece. Painted in tempera on wood, it is located above the altar of the Capponi Chapel of the church of Santa Felicita in Florence.

== Interpretation ==
This painting suggests a whirling dance of the grief-stricken. They inhabit a flattened space, comprising a sculptural congregation of brightly demarcated colors. The vortex of the composition droops down towards the limp body of Jesus off center in the left. Those lowering Christ appear to demand our help in sustaining both the weight of his body (and the burden of sin Christ took on) and their grief. No cross is visible; the natural world itself also appears to have nearly vanished: a lonely cloud and a shadowed patch of ground with a crumpled sheet provide sky and stratum for the mourners. If the sky and earth have lost color, the mourners have not; bright swathes of pink and blue envelop the pallid, limp Christ.

Pontormo's undulating mannerist contortions have been interpreted as intending to express apoplectic and uncontrolled spasms of melancholy. The Virgin, larger than her counterparts, swoons sideways inviting the support of those behind her; the Swoon of the Virgin was a controversial moment at the time. The assembly looks completely interlocked, as if architecturally integrated. Legend has it that Pontormo set himself in self-portrait at the extreme right of the canvas; but ultimately, the most compelling and empathic figure is the crouching man in the foreground, whose expression mixes the weight of the cadaver and the weight of melancholy.

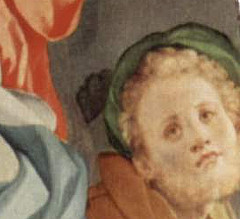
Possible self-portrait

This painting plays a key role and is discussed extensively in Sarah Winman's novel, Still Life.

== Other works ==
The Deposition from the Cross is one of the standard scenes from the life of Jesus in medieval art, and because of the complexities of the composition, it is one in which Renaissance artists continued to take a great interest. Several years prior to Pontormo's masterpiece, the Florentine painter Rosso Fiorentino had painted a more phantasmagorical and gymnastically challenged array in his crowded version of the Deposition of 1521.

Pontormo's grieving crowds and brightness of color also provide a stark contrast to Caravaggio's somber Deposition from the Cross or Entombment in the Vatican Pinacoteca. The Deposition by Raphael in the Galleria Borghese shows a later, though related scene: the Entombment of Christ.

In addition to works of the same subject by other artists, Pontormo's own work from the time provides a useful comparison. The decoration in the dome of the Capponi chapel is now lost, but four roundels with the Evangelists still adorn the pendentives, which were painted by both Pontormo and his apprentice Bronzino. The swathed drapery in The Visitation (1529) in the church of San Michele e Francesco at Carmignano bears a striking resemblance to that in the Deposition. The contrapposto of the figures can be compared to Pontormo's Annunciation (1520s) frescoed on the adjacent wall.
