= Column of Santa Felicita, Florence =

Coordinates: 43°46′02″N 11°15′08″E

The Column of Santa Felicita is a monumental column with Corinthian capital standing in front of the church of Santa Felicita in Florence, region of Tuscany, Italy.

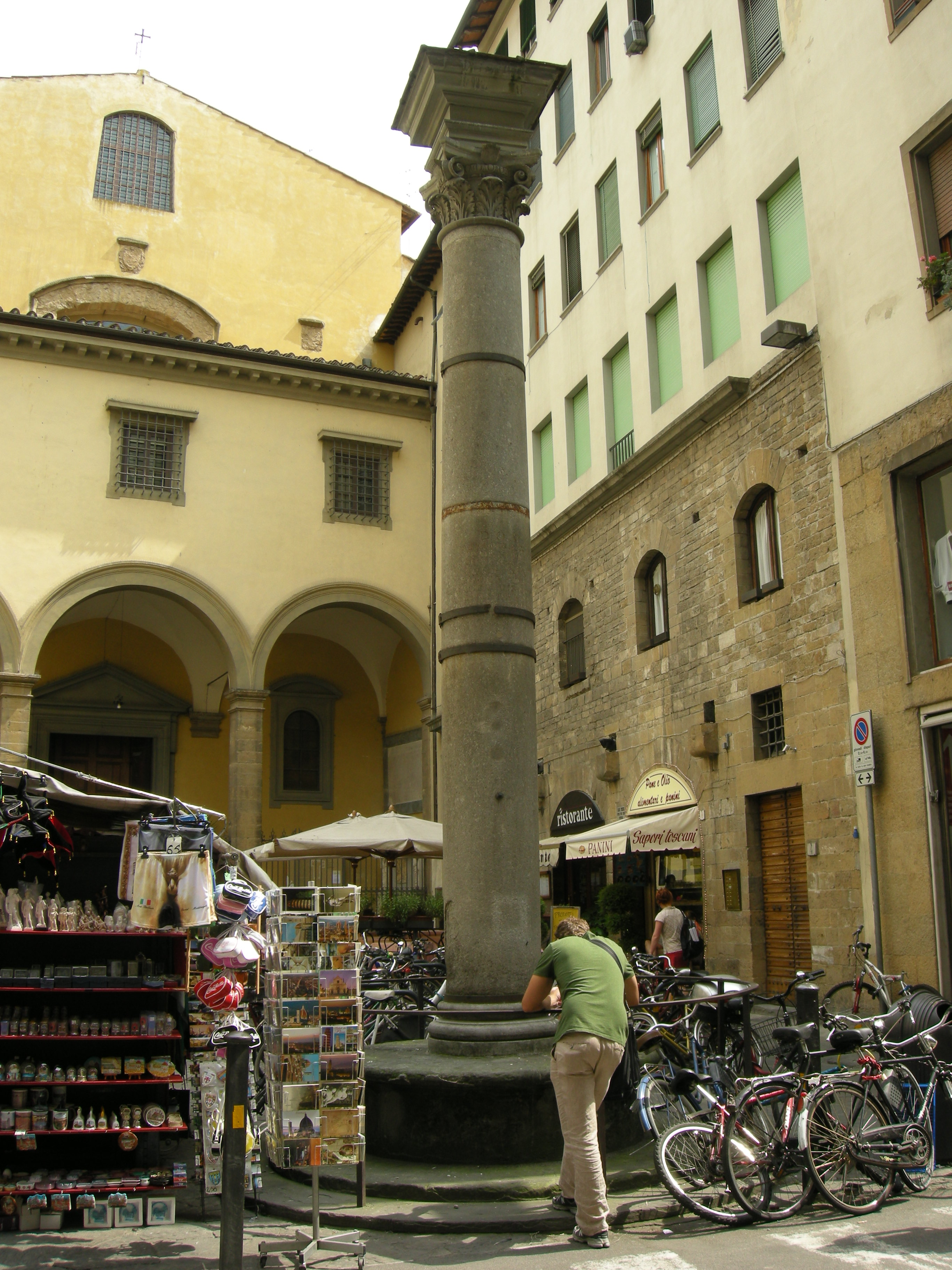
Column of Santa Felicita

== History ==
Putatively the column was erected to celebrate the 13th-century victories or crusades led by the Dominican friar Peter of Verona against the Cathar heresy in Northern Italy. In 1484, the capital had a terracotta statue Peter of Verona preaching, as he had to the Florentines and organizing his militia of the "Società di Santa Maria" used to persecute heretics. The column was financed by Amerigo De Rossi, whose ancestor was a follower of the Dominican preacher. There is some evidence that the column was erected earlier at the site of some former paleochristian tombs, and was surmounted by crosses.

The St Peter of Verona statue fell in 1723, but was replaced by a marble statue by Antonio Montauti, that itself was removed in the 19th century. Further injury was added when the Germans, destroying the bridges to the Arno river, mined the access to Ponte Vecchio, shattering the column. It has been cobbled together by metal rings, and it subsists in the tiny piazza crowded by tourist booths, forlorn in state, secular in apparel, shorn of all emblems of prior purposes.
