= Santa Felicita, Florence =

Roman Catholic church in Florence

Coordinates: 43°46′0.60″N 11°15′9.49″E

Church of Saint Felicity of Florence (Chiesa di Santa Felicita)
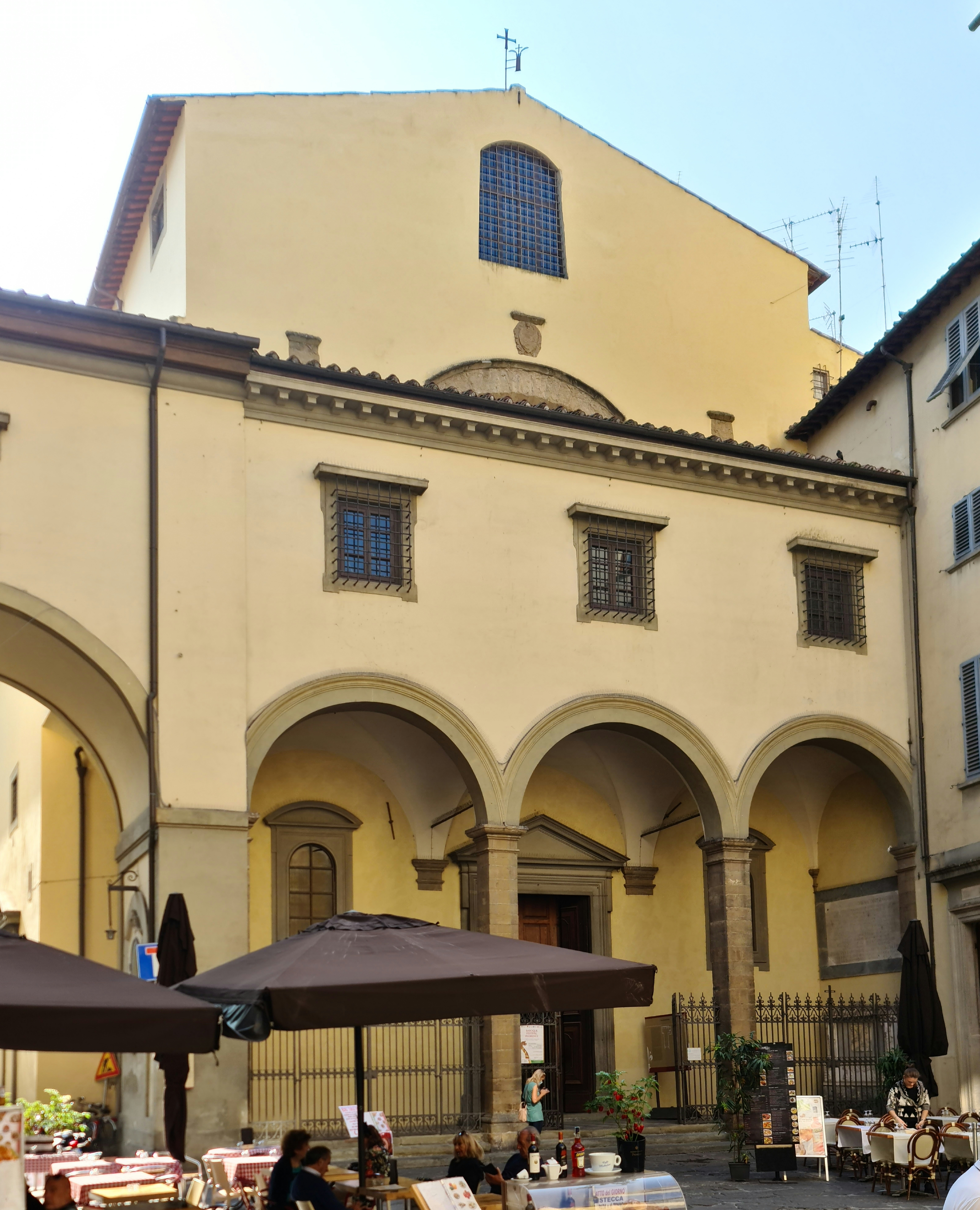
- West front of Santa Felicita behind Vasari Corridor.

Religion
- Affiliation: Roman Catholic
- Province: Florence

Location
- Location: Florence, Italy
- Interactive map of Church of Saint Felicity of Florence (Chiesa di Santa Felicita)

Architecture
- Architect: Ferdinando Ruggieri
- Type: Church
- Groundbreaking: 1736
- Completed: 1739

Interior of the church

Santa Felicita (Church of St Felicity) is a Roman Catholic church in Florence, region of Tuscany, Italy, probably the oldest in the city after San Lorenzo. In the 2nd century, Syrian Greek merchants settled in the area south of the Arno and are thought to have brought Christianity to the region. The first church on the site was probably built in the late 4th century or early 5th century and was dedicated to Saint Felicity of Rome. A new church was built in the 11th century and the current church largely dates from 1736–1739, under design by Ferdinando Ruggieri, who turned it into a one nave edifice. The monastery was suppressed under the Napoleonic occupation of 1808–1810.

The Vasari Corridor passes through the façade of this church and on the inside there is large window, covered by a thick gate, where the Grand Dukes of the Medici family used to listen to the mass without being seen by the people staying at ground level.

== Description ==
In the piazza in front of the façade, stands the rebuilt 15th-century Column of Santa Felicita. Only the 14th century Chapter House survives from the Romanesque with fragmentary frescoes (1387) by Niccolò di Pietro Gerini (Crucifixion and in the ceiling, roundels with the Redeemer and the Seven Virtues).

The Brunelleschian sacristy dates from 1473 and was under the patronage of the Canigiani family. There are the 14th century Madonna with Child and Saints by Taddeo Gaddi, the 15th century Adoration of the Magi by Francesco d'Antonio and St. Felicity with Her Seven Sons by Neri di Bicci.

The Barbadori (or Capponi) chapel dates also to the 15th century (1419–1423); it was designed by Filippo Brunelleschi and when the patronage passed to Lodovico di Gino Capponi the decoration was entrusted to Pontormo, who worked on it from 1525 until 1528. The painting of the vault has disappeared but in the chapel can still be seen the Four Evangelists in the pendentives and two of the greatest masterpieces by Pontormo: the Virgin and the Angel Gabriel on the side wall and the altarpiece of the Deposition above the end altar. The latter, enclosed in its gilded fame, with its surrealistic dimensions of elongated and entangled bodies and its range of iridescent colours, constitutes one of the most important works of Early Mannerism. The stained glass window depicting the Journey to the Sepulchre is a copy of the one done by Guglielmo da Marcillat in 1526.

The desire to create a complementary space to this led to the decoration of the opposite Canigiani chapel by Bernardino Poccetti (Miracle of Our Lady of the Snow, 1589–1590). In 1565, as recorded by Vasari himself, Grand Duke Cosimo I de' Medici decided to build the long corridor which would connect the old Priors' Palace in Piazza della Signoria with the new Medici residence, previously property of the Pitti family; as this would pass through the church of Santa Felicita, the church began to play a very important role in the life of the Medici court. Cigoli was responsible for the design of the chancel whose patrons were the Guicciardini family (and where the famous historian Francesco was buried in 1540). The work continued until the vault was decorated by Cinganelli (c. 1620); on the altar is the Adoration of the Shepherds attributed to Francesco Brina (1587).

In the church there are also the Martyrdom of the Maccabees (1863) by Antonio Ciseri in the 3rd chapel on the right, the Meeting of St. Anne and St. Joachim, attributed to Michele Tosini, at the end of the right transept, the Assumption of the Virgin with Saints (1677), attributed to Baldassare Franceschini, at the end of the left transept. In the Caponni chapel you can see The Deposition from the Cross (1528) by Jacopo Pontormo one of Pontormo's surviving masterpieces.

The sacristy has a painted crucifix (circa 1310) attributed to Pacino di Buonaguida.

== Bibliography ==
- Guglielmo Maetzke, Fiesole: scoperta di tombe etrusche in via G. Matteotti; Firenze: resti di basilica cimiteriale sotto santa Felicita; Sticciano scalo (Grosseto): scoperta di un tesoretto monetale disperso, in Notizie degli scavi di antichità, vol. 11, Roma, Accademia Nazionale dei Lincei, 1957, pp. 268–327

== Sources ==
- Cesati, Franco (2002). Le chiese di Firenze. Rome: Newton Compton.
