= Sarah Winman =

British author and actor (born 1964)

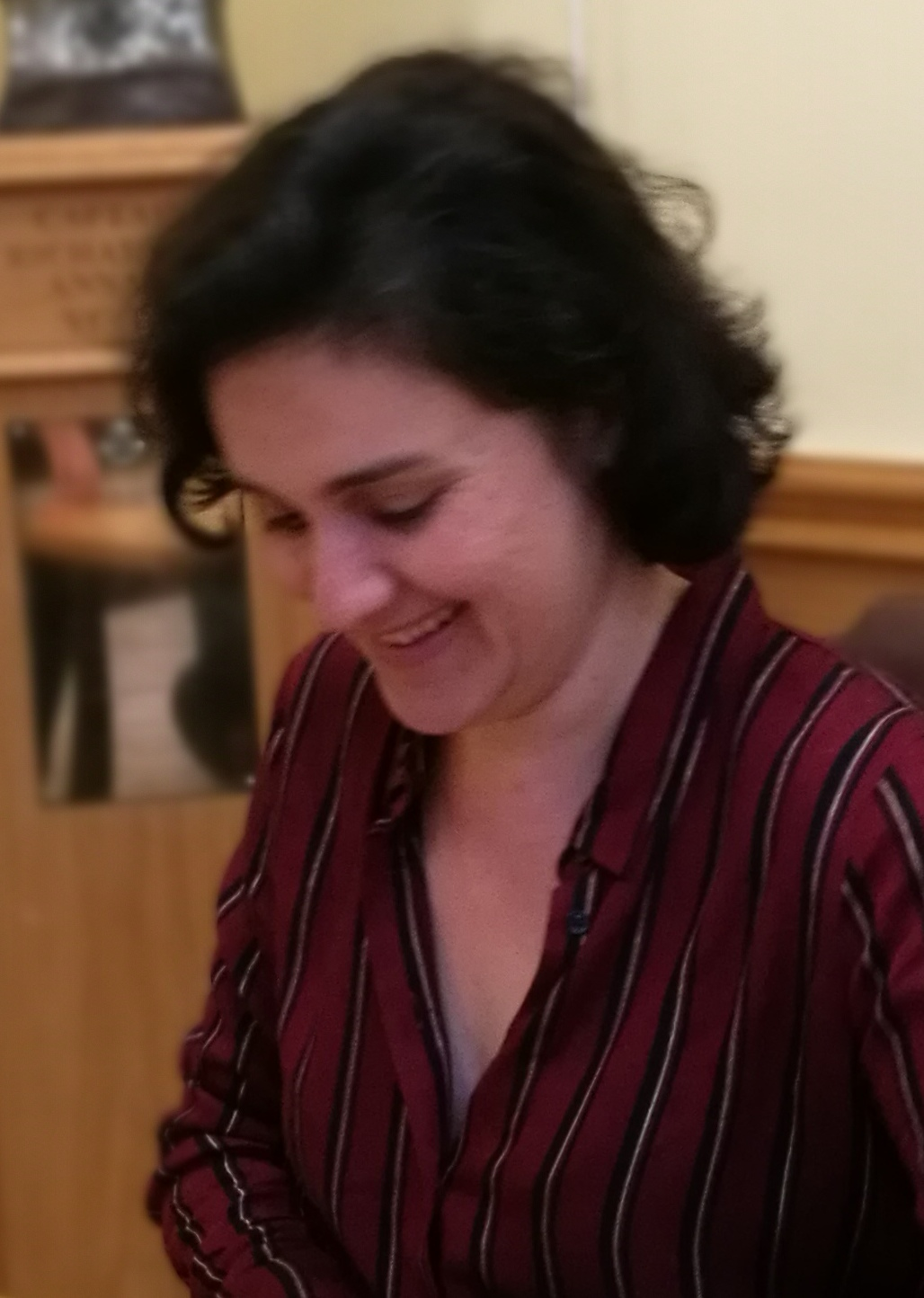
- Winman at the 2017 Durham Book Festival
- Born: Sarah Winman; 24 December 1964 (age 61); Ilford, Essex, England
- Occupations: Novelist and actor
- Years active: 1987–present

Sarah Winman (born 24 December 1964) is a British author and actor.

== Biography ==
In 2011, Winman's debut novel, When God Was a Rabbit (2011), became an international bestseller and won Winman several awards including New Writer of the Year at the Galaxy National Book Awards.

Winman's second novel, A Year of Marvellous Ways (2015), was published on 18 June 2015.

Winman's third novel, Tin Man, was published on 27 July 2017 and shortlisted for the 2017 Costa Book Award for Novel.

Winman's fourth novel, Still Life, was published on 1 June 2021.

Winman is an openly gay woman, having come out in the early 1980s.

== Acting credits ==
- A Quiet Conspiracy (1989)
- Act of Will (1989)
- Chimera (1991)
- Stay Lucky (1991)
- El C.I.D. (1992)
- The Inspector Alleyn Mysteries (1993)
- Staggered (1994)
- Chandler & Co (1995)
- September (1996)
- Taggart (1998)
- A Certain Justice (1998)
- Midsomer Murders (1999)
- Doctors (2001)
- The Discovery of Heaven (2001)
- The Forsyte Saga (2002)
- Bad Girls (2002)
- Prime Suspect VI: The Last Witness (2003)
- Foyle's War (2003)
- The Bill (2003–2005)
- Casualty (2005)
- H. G. Wells: War with the World (2006)
- Consuming Passion: 100 Years of Mills & Boon (2008)
- Holby City (2008–2010)
- Undeniable (2014)
- Call the Midwife series 6 episode 5 (2017)

== Bibliography ==
- When God Was a Rabbit, Headline Review, 2011, ISBN 978-0-7553-7928-6
- A Year of Marvellous Ways, Headline Review, 2015, ISBN 978-0-7553-9094-6
- Tin Man, Tinder Press, 2017, ISBN 978-0-7553-9095-3
- Still Life, Fourth Estate, 2021, ISBN 978-0-0082-8336-0
