= Between the Covers (TV programme) =

Book discussion TV programme

- Genre: Talk show; Book club; Comedy
- Created by: Sara Cox
- Presented by: Sara Cox
- Theme music composer: Mat Andasun
- Country of origin: United Kingdom
- Original language: English
- No. of series: 8
- No. of episodes: 50

Production
- Executive producer: Amanda Ross
- Producers: Emma Cahusac; Pollyanne Galpin; Holly Godsland; Scott Jenkins
- Running time: 29 minutes
- Production company: Cactus TV

Original release
- Network: BBC
- Release: 9 October 2020 – 3 December 2024

Between the Covers is a BBC talk show hosted by Sara Cox in which guest stars talk about their favourite books, alongside other book picks as well.

In March 2024, a Between The Covers Live! Tour was announced. The initial run of shows would have show dates in London, Oxford, Nottingham, Birmingham, Reading and Brighton and would feature Jo Brand, Kacey Ainsworth, Stephen Mangan, and Joseph O'Connor. The tour would be hosted by the TV series executive producer, Amanda Ross.

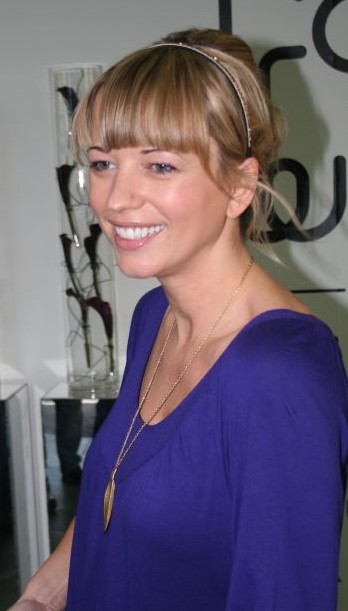
Sara Cox is the presenter of Between The Covers

== Episodes ==
=== Series One (2020) ===
Sara Cox talks to guest stars about their favourite books as well as a book of the week pick from 2020, and a book written by one of the guests. These books are:

Book of the Week Pick (From 2020)

- The Midnight Library by Matt Haig
- Love After Love by Ingrid Persaud
- Fifty-Fifty by Steve Cavanagh
- This Lovely City by Louise Hare
- Small Pleasures by Clare Chambers
- Love in Colour: Mythical Tales from Around the World, Retold by Bolu Babalola
- The Devil and the Dark Water by Stuart Turton

Book Written By a Guest

- Sex Power Money (2019) by Sara Pascoe
- The Thursday Murder Club (2020) by Richard Osman
- Love and Other Thought Experiments (2020) by Sophie Ward
- To Be a Gay Man (2020) by Will Young
- Just Ignore Him (2020) by Alan Davies
- The Corner Shop (2019) by Babita Sharma
- Home Stretch (2020) by Graham Norton

No.	Guest Stars	Directed by	Original air date
1	Sara Pascoe, Tom Allen, Sophie Ellis-Bextor, and Phil Wang	Toby Baker; Jonathan Stow (videotape director)	9 October 2020
First episode. Books chosen by the guests are Americanah (2013) by Chimamanda Ngozi Adichie (Sara Pascoe),Tales of the City (1978) by Armistead Maupin (Tom Allen), Hangover Square (1941) by Patrick Hamilton (Sophie Ellis-Bextor), and The Iliad (ca. 8th century B.C.E.) by Homer (Phil Wang). The Book of the Week Pick from 2020 is The Midnight Library by Matt Haig, and the book written by a guest is Sex Power Money (2019) by Sara Pascoe.
2	Richard Osman, Ricky Wilson, Ellie Taylor, and Lolly Adefope	Toby Baker; Jonathan Stow (videotape director)	16 October 2020
Books chosen by the guests are Life After Life (2013) by Kate Atkinson (Richard Osman), Born Standing Up: A Comic’s Life (2007) by Steve Martin (Ricky Wilson), Harry Potter and the Philosopher's Stone (1997) by J.K. Rowling (Ellie Taylor), and The First Bad Man (2015) by Miranda July (Lolly Adefope). The Book of the Week Pick from 2020 is Love After Love by Ingrid Persaud, and the book written by a guest is The Thursday Murder Club (2020) by Richard Osman.
3	Ade Adepitan, Rebecca Front, Bill Bailey, and Sophie Ward	Toby Baker; Jonathan Stow (videotape director)	23 October 2020
Books chosen by the guests are Half of a Yellow Sun (2006) by Chimamanda Ngozi Adichie (Ade Adepitan), The Wind in the Willows (1908) by Kenneth Grahame (Rebecca Front), A Confederacy of Dunces (1980) by John Kennedy Toole (Bill Bailey), and Dusty Answer (1927) by Rosamond Lehmann (Sophie Ward). The Book of the Week Pick from 2020 is Fifty-Fifty by Steve Cavanagh, and the book written by a guest is Love and Other Thought Experiments Club (2020) by Sophie Ward.
4	Andi Osho, Jo Brand, Will Young, and Ade Edmondson	Toby Baker; Jonathan Stow (videotape director)	30 October 2020
Books chosen by the guests are Red Dwarf (1989) by Grant Naylor (Andi Osho), The Ragged-Trousered Philanthropists (1914) by Robert Tressell (Jo Brand), Lord of the Rings (1954 - 1955) by J. R. R. Tolkien (Will Young), and War and Peace (1867) by Leo Tolstoy (Ade Edmondson). The Book of the Week Pick from 2020 is This Lovely City by Louise Hare, and the book written by a guest is To Be a Gay Man (2020) by Will Young.
5	Anita Rani, Laura Whitmore, Alan Davies, and Russell Kane	Toby Baker; Jonathan Stow (videotape director)	6 November 2020
Books chosen by the guests are The Master and Margarita (1966) by Mikhail Bulgakov (Anita Rani), Matilda (1988) by Roald Dahl (Laura Whitmore), The Sellout (2015) by Paul Beatty (Alan Davies), and Madame Bovary (1856) by Gustave Flaubert (Russell Kane). The Book of the Week Pick from 2020 is Small Pleasures by Clare Chambers, and the book written by a guest is Just Ignore Him (2020) by Alan Davies.
6	Meera Syal, Babita Sharma, Guvna B, and Dave Gorman	Toby Baker; Jonathan Stow (videotape director)	13 November 2020
Books chosen by the guests are Beloved (1987) by Toni Morrison (Meera Syal and Babita Sharma), The Ruthless Elimination of Hurry (2019) by John Mark Comer (Guvna B), and Who on Earth is Tom Baker? An Autobiography (1997) by Tom Baker (Dave Gorman). The Book of the Week Pick from 2020 is Love in Colour: Mythical Tales from Around the World, Retold by Bolu Babalola, and the book written by a guest is The Corner Shop (2020) by Babita Sharma.
7	Desiree Burch, Graham Norton, Grace Dent, and Ben Miller	Toby Baker; Jonathan Stow (videotape director)	20 November 2020
Books chosen by the guests are Dietland (2015) by Sarai Walker (Desiree Burch), The Other Side of the Bridge (2006) by Mary Lawson (Graham Norton), Fleishman is in Trouble (2019) by Taffy Brodesser-Akner (Grace Dent), and The Three-Body Problem (2008) by Cixin Liu (Ben Miller). The Book of the Week Pick from 2020 is The Devil and the Dark Water by Stuart Turton, and the book written by a guest is Home Stretch (2020) by Graham Norton.

=== Series Two (2021) ===
Sara Cox talks to guest stars about their favourite books as well as a book recently published in 2021, and a popular book from 2020. These books are:

2021

- The Fine Art of Invisible Detection by Robert Goddard
- Should We Fall Behind by Sharon Duggal
- Sixteen Horses by Greg Buchanan
- Another Life by Jodie Chapman
- The Last House on Needless Street by Catriona Ward
- The Frequency of Us by Keith Stuart

2020

- The Vanishing Half by Brit Bennett
- The Lying Life of Adults by Elena Ferrante
- The Girl with the Louding Voice by Abi Daré
- Agent Running in the Field by John le Carré
- Hamnet by Maggie O’Farrell
- Shuggie Bain by Douglas Stuart

No.	Guest Stars	Directed by	Original air date
1	Mel Giedroyc, Griff Rhys Jones, Oti Mabuse, and Rick Edwards	Toby Baker	10 May 2021
Books chosen by the guests are Les Misérables (1862) by Victor Hugo (Mel Giedroyc), One Two Three Four: The Beatles in Time (2020) by Craig Brown (Griff Rhys Jones), Think Like A Monk (2020) by Jay Shetty (Oti Mabuse), and Other Minds: The Octopus and the Evolution of Intelligent Life (2017) by Peter Godfrey-Smith (Rick Edwards). The recently published book from 2021 is The Fine Art of Invisible Detection by Robert Goddard, and the popular book from 2020 is The Vanishing Half by Brit Bennett.
2	Vick Hope, Rob Delaney, Rick Stein and Rachel Parris	Toby Baker	17 May 2021
Books chosen by the guests are Swing Time (2016) by Zadie Smith (Vick Hope), A Manual for Cleaning Women (2015) by Lucia Berlin (Rob Delaney), The Leopard (1958) by Giuseppe Tomasi di Lampedusa (Rick Stein), and The Name of the Wind (2007) by Patrick Rothfuss (Rachel Parris). The recently published book from 2021 is Should We Fall Behind by Sharon Duggal, and the popular book from 2020 is The Lying Life of Adults by Elena Ferrante.
3	Phil Davis, Katherine Ryan, Adjoa Andoh and David Baddiel	Toby Baker	24 May 2021
Books chosen by the guests are Great Expectations (1861) by Charles Dickens (Phil Davis), Everybody Died, So I Got a Dog (2019) by Emily Dean (Katherine Ryan), Plainsong (1999) by Kent Haruf (Adjoa Andoh), and Emma (1815) by Jane Austen (David Baddiel). The recently published book from 2021 is Sixteen Horses by Greg Buchanan, and the popular book from 2020 is The Girl with the Louding Voice by Abi Daré.
4	Hugh Dennis, Don Warrington, Zoe Lyons and Giovanna Fletcher	Toby Baker	31 May 2021
Books chosen by the guests are Jemima J (2000) by Jane Green (Giovanna Fletcher), The Mandibles (2016) by Lionel Shriver (Zoe Lyons), The Fire Next Time (1963) by James Baldwin (Don Warrington), and One Hundred Years of Solitude (1967) by Gabriel García Márquez (Hugh Dennis). The recently published book from 2021 is Another Life by Jodie Chapman, and the popular book from 2020 is Agent Running in the Field by John le Carré.
5	Nish Kumar, Stacey Dooley, Caitlin Moran and Robert Webb	Toby Baker	7 June 2021
Books chosen by the guests are A Little Life (2015) by Hanya Yanagihara (Nish Kumar), Home Body (2020) by Rupi Kaur (Stacey Dooley), How to be a Medieval Woman (1438) by Margery Kempe (Caitlin Moran) and Waterland (1983) by Graham Swift (Robert Webb). The recently published book from 2021 is The Last House on Needless Street by Catriona Ward, and the popular book from 2020 is Hamnet by Maggie O'Farrell.
6	Ranvir Singh, Micky Flanagan, Reginald D. Hunter and Sophie Willan	Toby Baker	15 June 2021
Books chosen by the guests are The Moonstone (1868) by Wilkie Collins (Ranvir Singh), Glue (2001) by Irvine Welsh (Micky Flanagan), The Joke (1967) by Milan Kundera (Reginald D. Hunter) and Planet Young (2009) by Gerry Potter (Sophie Willan). The recently published book from 2021 is The Frequency of Us by Keith Stuart, and the popular book from 2020 is Shuggie Bain by Douglas Stuart.

=== Series Three (2021) ===
Sara Cox talks to guest stars about their favourite books as well as a new book from 2021 and a Booker Prize backlist gem. These books are:

2021

- Sorrow And Bliss by Meg Mason
- The Coward by Jarred McGinnis
- Still Life by Sarah Winman
- Ascension by Oliver Harris
- Small Things Like These by Claire Keegan
- Sankofa by Chibundu Onuzo

Booker Prize backlist gems

- Good Behaviour (1981) by Molly Keane
- The Bookshop (1978) by Penelope Fitzgerald
- Exit West (2017) by Mohsin Hamid
- The Garden of Evening Mists (2011) by Tan Twan Eng
- Fingersmith (2002) by Sarah Waters
- The Secret Scripture (2008) by Sebastian Barry

No.	Guest Stars	Directed by	Original air date
1	Emilia Fox, Dane Baptiste, Andy Parsons and Evanna Lynch	Tim Van Someren	10 November 2021
Books chosen by the guests are Three Women (2019) by Lisa Taddeo (Emilia Fox), The Autobiography of Malcolm X (1965) by Malcolm X (Dane Baptiste), Oh, The Places You'll Go! (1990) by Dr. Seuss (Andy Parsons) and Loving Sabotage (1993) by Amélie Nothomb (Evanna Lynch). The new book from 2021 is Sorrow And Bliss by Meg Mason, and the Booker Prize backlist gem is Good Behaviour (1981) by Molly Keane.
2	John Thomson, Fern Brady, Lou Sanders and Olly Smith	Tim Van Someren	17 November 2021
Books chosen by the guests are Carte Blanche (2011) by Jeffery Deaver (John Thomson), Oranges Are Not The Only Fruit (1985) by Jeanette Winterson (Fern Brady), Delicacy (2021) by Katy Wix (Lou Sanders) and The Spy and the Traitor (2018) by Ben MacIntyre (Olly Smith). The new book from 2021 is The Coward by Jarred McGinnis, and the Booker Prize backlist gem is The Bookshop (1978) by Penelope Fitzgerald.
3	Ben Miller, Kacey Ainsworth, Rob Rinder and Sindhu Vee	Tim Van Someren	24 November 2021
Books chosen by the guests are The Fight (1975) by Norman Mailer (Ben Miller), The Unbearable Lightness of Being (1984) by Milan Kundera (Kacey Ainsworth), To Kill a Mockingbird (1960) by Harper Lee (Rob Rinder) and She Left Me the Gun (2013) by Emma Brockes (Sindhu Vee). The new book from 2021 is Still Life by Sarah Winman, and the Booker Prize backlist gem is Exit West (2017) by Mohsin Hamid.
4	Alan Davies, Sarah Kendall, Iain Stirling and Suzi Ruffell	Tim Van Someren	1 December 2021
Books chosen by the guests are May We Be Forgiven (2012) by A. M. Homes (Alan Davies), Slaughterhouse-Five (1969) by Kurt Vonnegut (Sarah Kendall), The Acid House (1994) by Irvine Welsh (Iain Stirling) and Little Women (1868) by Louisa May Alcott (Suzi Ruffell). The new book from 2021 is Ascension by Oliver Harris, and the Booker Prize backlist gem is The Garden of Evening Mists (2011) by Tan Twan Eng.
5	Sharleen Spiteri, Prue Leith, Jason Forbes and Ben Willbond	Tim Van Someren	8 December 2021
Books chosen by the guests are Perfume: The Story of a Murderer (1985) by Patrick Süskind (Sharleen Spiteri), The Lightning Thread (2021) by David Profumo (Prue Leith), The Canterbury Tales (1440) by Geoffrey Chaucer (Jason Forbes) and Any Human Heart (2002) by William Boyd (Ben Willbond). The new book from 2021 is Small Things Like These by Claire Keegan, and the Booker Prize backlist gem is Fingersmith (2002) by Sarah Waters.
6	Greg James, Imogen Stubbs, Fleur East and Lloyd Griffith	Tim Van Someren	15 December 2021
Books chosen by the guests are Right Ho, Jeeves (1934) by P.G. Wodehouse (Greg James), A Fine Balance (1995) by Rohinton Mistry (Imogen Stubbs), Enduring Love (1997) by Ian McEwan (Fleur East) and How to Stop Time (2017) by Matt Haig (Lloyd Griffith). The new book from 2021 is Sankofa by Chibundu Onuzo, and the Booker Prize backlist gem is The Secret Scripture (2008) by Sebastian Barry.

=== Series Four (2022) ===
Sara Cox talks to guest stars about their favourite books as well as a new book from 2022 and a book from the Big Jubilee Read. These books are:

2022

- People Person by Candice Carty-Williams
- Two Storm Wood by Philip Gray
- Lessons In Chemistry by Bonnie Garmus
- Love Marriage by Monica Ali
- Metronome by Tom Watson
- Exactly What You Mean by Ben Hinshaw
- The Dictator's Wife by Freya Berry

Big Jubilee Read

- The English Patient (1992) by Michael Ondaatje
- The Lonely Londoners (1956) by Sam Selvon
- Arrow Of God (1964) by Chinua Achebe
- The Handmaid's Tale (1985) by Margaret Atwood
- The Secret River (2005) by Kate Grenville
- The Night Tiger (2019) by Yangsze Choo
- The Crow Eaters (1978) by Bapsi Sidhwa

No.	Guest Stars	Directed by	Original air date
1	Richard Osman, Deborah Frances-White, David Morrissey and Vick Hope	Tim Van Someren	11 May 2022
Books chosen by the guests are The Talented Mr. Ripley (1955) by Patricia Highsmith (Richard Osman), Rainbow Milk (2020) by Paul Mendez (Deborah Frances-White), Giovanni's Room (1956) by James Baldwin (David Morrissey) and Noughts & Crosses (2001) by Malorie Blackman (Vick Hope). The new book from 2022 is People Person by Candice Carty-Williams, and the Big Jubilee Read book is The English Patient (1992) by Michael Ondaatje.
2	Sir Trevor McDonald, Sarah Hadland, Peter Davison and Cariad Lloyd	Tim Van Someren	18 May 2022
Books chosen by the guests are The Fatal Shore (1986) by Robert Hughes (Sir Trevor McDonald), My Name Is Lucy Barton (2016) by Elizabeth Strout (Sarah Hadland), Polar (2002) by T.R. Pearson (Peter Davison) and H is for Hawk (2014) by Helen Macdonald (Cariad Lloyd). The new book from 2022 is Two Storm Wood by Philip Gray, and the Big Jubilee Read book is The Lonely Londoners (1956) by Sam Selvon.
3	Richard E Grant, Deborah Meaden, Stephen Bailey and Sukh Ojla	Tim Van Someren	25 May 2022
Books chosen by the guests are Alice's Adventures In Wonderland (1865) by Lewis Carroll (Richard E Grant), Cocktail Hour Under the Tree of Forgetfulness (2011) by Alexandra Fuller (Deborah Meaden), Where the Crawdads Sing (2018) by Delia Owens (Stephen Bailey) and The Gargoyle (2008) by Andrew Davidson (Sukh Ojla). The new book from 2022 is Lessons In Chemistry by Bonnie Garmus, and the Big Jubilee Read book is Arrow of God (1964) by Chinua Achebe.
4	Jo Brand, Darren Harriott, Nina Wadia and Neil Morrissey	Tim Van Someren	1 Jun 2022
Books chosen by the guests are The Faber Book of Reportage (1987) edited by John Carey (Jo Brand), The Road to Character (2015) by David Brooks (Darren Harriott), The Return of Faraz Ali (2022) by Aamina Ahmad (Nina Wadia) and Disgrace (1999) by J. M. Coetzee (Neil Morrissey). The new book from 2022 is Love Marriage by Monica Ali, and the Big Jubilee Read book is The Handmaid's Tale (1985) by Margaret Atwood.
5	Emeli Sandé, Pierre Novellie, Rev Kate Bottley and Adrian Scarborough	Tim Van Someren	8 Jun 2022
Books chosen by the guests are Maria Callas: The Woman Behind the Legend (1981) by Arianna Huffington (Emeli Sandé), No One Is Talking About This (2021) by Patricia Lockwood (Pierre Novellie), The Five (2019) by Hallie Rubenhold (Rev Kate Bottley) and Offshore (1979) by Penelope Fitzgerald (Adrian Scarborough). The new book from 2022 is Metronome by Tom Watson, and the Big Jubilee Read book is The Secret River (2005) by Kate Grenville.
6	Mel Giedroyc, Jordan North, Jen Brister and Rhys Stephenson	Tim Van Someren	15 Jun 2022
Books chosen by the guests are The Way We Live Now (1875) by Anthony Trollope (Mel Giedroyc), The Heart's Invisible Furies (2017) by John Boyne (Jordan North), A Prayer for Owen Meany (1989) by John Irving (Jen Brister) and The Old Man and the Sea (1951) by Ernest Hemingway (Rhys Stephenson). The new book from 2022 is Exactly What You Mean by Ben Hinshaw, and the Big Jubilee Read book is The Night Tiger (2019) by Yangsze Choo.
7	Dan Smith, Catherine Bohart, Colin Salmon and Katy Wix	Tim Van Someren	21 Jun 2022
Books chosen by the guests are The Overstory (2018) by Richard Powers (Dan Smith), The Topeka School (2019) by Ben Lerner (Catherine Bohart), The Count of Monte Cristo (1844) by Alexandre Dumas (Colin Salmon) and Bluets (2009) by Maggie Nelson (Katy Wix). The new book from 2022 is The Dictator's Wife by Freya Berry, and the Big Jubilee Read book is The Crow Eaters (1978) by Bapsi Sidhwa.

=== Series Five (2022) ===
Sara Cox talks to guest stars about their favourite books as well as a new book from 2022 and one from the Booker Prize back catalogue. These books are:

2022

- The Perfect Golden Circle by Benjamin Myers
- The Second Sight of Zachary Cloudesley by Sean Lusk
- Sometimes People Die by Simon Stephenson
- The Night Ship by Jess Kidd
- Take My Hand by Dolen Perkins-Valdez
- The Dance Tree by Kiran Millwood Hargrave

Booker Prize

- Cloud Atlas (2004) by David Mitchell
- Snap (2018) by Belinda Bauer
- The Long Song (2010) by Andrea Levy
- The Remains of the Day (1989) by Kazuo Ishiguro
- Moon Tiger (1987) by Penelope Lively
- Us (2014) by David Nicholls

No.	Guest Stars	Directed by	Original air date
1	Graham Norton, Alex Jones, Amanda Abbington and JJ Chalmers	Tim Van Someren	8 Nov 2022
Books chosen by the guests are Kindred (1979) by Octavia E. Butler (Graham Norton), Educated (2018) by Tara Westover (Alex Jones), Deep (2014) by James Nestor (Amanda Abbington) and Forrest Gump (1986) by Winston Groom (JJ Chalmers). The new book from 2022 is The Perfect Golden Circle by Benjamin Myers, and the Booker Prize book is Cloud Atlas (2004) by David Mitchell.
2	Ruth Jones, Kae Kurd, Jessie Cave and Samuel West	Tim Van Someren	15 Nov 2022
Books chosen by the guests are The Island of Missing Trees (2021) by Elif Shafak (Ruth Jones), Scary Smart (2021) by Mo Gawdat (Kae Kurd), The School for Good Mothers (2022) by Jessamine Chan (Jessie Cave) and Howards End (1910) by E. M. Forster (Samuel West). The new book from 2022 is The Second Sight Of Zachary Cloudesley by Sean Lusk, and the Booker Prize book is Snap (2018) by Belinda Bauer.
3	Paterson Joseph, Sophie Raworth, Al Murray and Jenny Eclair	Tim Van Someren	22 Nov 2022
Books chosen by the guests are The Hitchhiker’s Guide To The Galaxy (1979) by Douglas Adams (Paterson Joseph), The Salt Path (2018) by Raynor Winn (Sophie Raworth), Catch-22 (1961) by Joseph Heller (Al Murray) and I'm Glad My Mom Died (2022) by Jennette McCurdy (Jenny Eclair). The new book from 2022 is Sometimes People Die by Simon Stephenson, and the Booker Prize book is The Long Song (2010) by Andrea Levy.
4	Tom Allen, Pam Ferris, Rakhee Thakrar and Stephen Mangan	Tim Van Someren	6 Dec 2022
Books chosen by the guests are The Song of Achilles (2011) by Madeline Miller (Tom Allen), All the Light We Cannot See (2014) by Anthony Doerr (Pam Ferris), A Man Called Ove (2012) by Fredrik Backman (Rakhee Thakrar) and The Secret Diary of Adrian Mole, Aged 13 ¾ (1982) by Sue Townsend (Stephen Mangan). The new book from 2022 is The Night Ship by Jess Kidd, and the Booker Prize book is The Remains of the Day (1989) by Kazuo Ishiguro.
5	Gabby Logan, Ade Adepitan, Kerry Godliman and Tom Read Wilson	Tim Van Someren	13 Dec 2022
Books chosen by the guests are The Echo Chamber (2021) by John Boyne (Gabby Logan), Guns, Germs and Steel (1997) by Jared Diamond (Ade Adepitan), Free Love (2022) by Tessa Hadley (Kerry Godliman) and The Moon's a Balloon (1971) by David Niven (Tom Read Wilson). The new book from 2022 is Take My Hand by Dolen Perkins-Valdez, and the Booker Prize book is Moon Tiger (1987) by Penelope Lively.
6	Ugo Monye, Sarah Keyworth, Clara Amfo and Rick Edwards	Tim Van Someren	20 Dec 2022
Books chosen by the guests are The Purpose Driven Life (2002) by Rick Warren (Ugo Monye), Tomorrow, and Tomorrow, and Tomorrow (2022) by Gabrielle Zevin (Sarah Keyworth), White Teeth (2000) by Zadie Smith (Clara Amfo) and The Scout Mindset (2021) by Julia Galef (Rick Edwards). The new book from 2022 is The Dance Tree by Kiran Millwood Hargrave, and the Booker Prize book is Us (2014) by David Nicholls.

=== Series Six (2023) ===
Sara Cox talks to guest stars about their favourite books as well as a new book from 2023 and a book set in Europe to celebrate Eurovision.

2023

- In the Blink of an Eye by Jo Callaghan
- The Space Between Us by Doug Johnstone
- Weyward by Emilia Hart
- Strange Sally Diamond by Liz Nugent
- Hungry Ghosts by Kevin Jared Hosein
- Old God's Time by Sebastian Barry

Eurovision-inspired book

- Burial Rites (2013) by Hannah Kent
- Lullaby (2016) by Leïla Slimani
- Death and the Penguin (1996) by Andrey Kurkov
- The Summer Book (1972) by Tove Jansson
- I'm Not Scared (2001) by Niccolò Ammaniti
- My Family and Other Animals (1956) by Gerald Durrell

No.	Guest Stars	Directed by	Original air date
1	Angela Scanlon, DJ Spoony, Rob Rinder, and Cerys Matthews	Tim Van Someren	13 Mar 2023
Books chosen by the guests are Untamed (2020) by Glennon Doyle (Angela Scanlon), Natives (2019) by Akala (DJ Spoony), Utz (1988) by Bruce Chatwin (Rob Rinder) and Under Milk Wood (1954) by Dylan Thomas (Cerys Matthews). The new book from 2023 is Blink of an Eye by Jo Callaghan, and the Eurovision-inspired book is Burial Rites (2013) by Hannah Kent, which is set in Iceland.
2	Alan Davies, Ivo Graham, Samantha Bond, and Sunetra Sarker	Tim Van Someren	20 Mar 2023
Books chosen by the guests are Bad Blood (2000) by Lorna Sage (Alan Davies), High Fidelity (1995) by Nick Hornby (Ivo Graham), Bel Canto (2001) by Ann Patchett (Samantha Bond) and How To Kill Your Family (2021) by Bella Mackie (Sunetra Sarker). The new book from 2023 is The Space Between Us by Doug Johnstone, and the Eurovision-inspired book is Lullaby (2016) by Leïla Slimani, which is set in France.
3	Mel Giedroyc, Sophie Duker, Hugh Fearnley-Whittingstall, and Nigel Havers	Tim Van Someren	27 Mar 2023
Books chosen by the guests are The Magic Mountain (1924) by Thomas Mann (Mel Giedroyc), Send Nudes (2022) by Saba Sams (Sophie Duker), How to Read Water (2017) by Tristan Gooley (Hugh Fearnley-Whittingstall) and The Darling Buds of May (1958) by H.E. Bates (Nigel Havers). The new book from 2023 is Weyward by Emilia Hart, and the Eurovision-inspired book is Death and the Penguin (1996) by Andrey Kurkov, which is set in Ukraine.
4	Sara Pascoe, Charlie Higson, Katie Melua, Adam Garcia	Tim Van Someren	3 Apr 2023
Books chosen by the guests are My Phantoms (2021) by Gwendoline Riley (Sara Pascoe), Pop. 1280 (1964) by Jim Thompson (Charlie Higson), Born to Run (2009) by Christopher McDougall (Katie Melua) and Oryx and Crake (2003) by Margaret Atwood (Adam Garcia). The new book from 2023 is Strange Sally Diamond by Liz Nugent, and the Eurovision-inspired book is The Summer Book (1972) by Tove Jansson, which is set in Finland.
5	Nick Knowles, Sara Barron, Ore Oduba, and Helen McGinn	Tim Van Someren	10 Apr 2023
Books chosen by the guests are Smoke and Mirrors (1998) by Neil Gaiman (Nick Knowles), I'll Show Myself Out (2022) by Jessi Klein (Sara Barron), A Clockwork Orange (1962) by Anthony Burgess (Ore Oduba) and Hollywood Wives (1983) by Jackie Collins (Helen McGinn). The new book from 2023 is Hungry Ghosts by Kevin Jared Hosein, and the Eurovision-inspired book is I'm Not Scared (2003) by Niccolò Ammaniti, which is set in Italy.
6	Laura Whitmore, Meera Syal, Gethin Jones, and Joe Thomas	Tim Van Someren	17 Apr 2023
Books chosen by the guests are After The Silence (2020) by Louise O'Neill (Laura Whitmore), Sophia (2015) by Anita Anand (Meera Syal), War Doctor (2019) by David Nott (Gethin Jones) and The Secret History (1992) by Donna Tartt (Joe Thomas). The new book from 2023 is Old God's Time by Sebastian Barry, and the Eurovision-inspired book is My Family and Other Animals (1956) by Gerald Durrell, which is set in Corfu, Greece.

=== Series Seven (2023) ===
Sara Cox talks to guest stars about their favourite books as well as a new book from 2023 and a classic from the Booker back catalogue.

2023

- The Seventh Son by Sebastian Faulks
- The Square of Sevens by Laura Shepherd-Robinson
- Remember, Mr Sharma by A. P. Firdaus
- Falling Animals by Sheila Armstrong
- Devil’s Breath by Jill Johnson
- The Unspeakable Acts of Zina Pavlou by Eleni Kyriacou

Booker Prize

- The God of Small Things (1997) by Arundhati Roy
- Paddy Clarke Ha Ha Ha (1993) by Roddy Doyle
- The Light of Day (2003) by Graham Swift
- My Sister, the Serial Killer (2019) by Oyinkan Braithwaite
- Any Human Heart (2002) by William Boyd
- Redhead by the Side of the Road (2020) by Anne Tyler

No.	Guest Stars	Directed by	Original air date
1	Rob Delaney, Anita Rani, Richard Armitage, and Jo Brand	Tim Van Someren	6 November 2023
Books chosen by the guests are Pessimism is for Lightweights (2023) by Salena Godden (Anita Rani), My Father's House (2023) by Joseph O'Connor (Jo Brand), North and South (1854) by Elizabeth Gaskell (Richard Armitage) and Runaway (2004) by Alice Munro (Rob Delaney). The new book from 2023 is The Seventh Son by Sebastian Faulks, and the Booker Prize book is The God of Small Things (1997) by Arundhati Roy.
2	Adrian Edmondson, Angela Barnes, Annie Macmanus, and Chris McCausland	Tim Van Someren	13 November 2023
Books chosen by the guests are The History Man (1975) by Malcolm Bradbury (Adrian Edmondson), Stasiland (2002) by Anna Funder (Angela Barnes), How To Build A Boat (2023) by Elaine Feeney (Annie Macmanus) and The Cleaner (2013) by Mark Dawson (Chris McCausland). The new book from 2023 is The Square of Sevens by Laura Shepherd-Robinson, and the Booker Prize book is Paddy Clarke Ha Ha Ha (1993) by Roddy Doyle.
3	Adam Kay, Alex Jones, Omari Douglas, and Sandi Toksvig	Tim Van Someren	20 November 2023
Books chosen by the guests are The Last Romeo (2018) by Justin Myers (Adam Kay), The Other Boleyn Girl (2001) by Philippa Gregory (Alex Jones), Convenience Store Woman (2016) by Sayaka Murata (Omari Douglas) and The Black Angels (2023) by Maria Smilios (Sandi Toksvig). The new book from 2023 is Remember, Mr Sharma by A. P. Firdaus, and the Booker Prize book is The Light of Day (2003) by Graham Swift.
4	Ahir Shah, Andi Osho, Ed Byrne, and Suzi Ruffell	Tim Van Someren	27 November 2023
Books chosen by the guests are Leviathan (1651) by Thomas Hobbes (Ahir Shah), Will (2021) by Will Smith and Mark Manson (Andi Osho), Captain Corelli's Mandolin (1994) by Louis de Bernières (Ed Byrne) and The Seven Husbands of Evelyn Hugo (2017) by Taylor Jenkins Reid (Suzi Ruffell). The new book from 2023 is Falling Animals by Sheila Armstrong, and the Booker Prize book is My Sister, the Serial Killer (2019) by Oyinkan Braithwaite.
5	Ben Miller, Kerry Godliman, Laura Smyth, and Nish Kumar	Tim Van Someren	4 December 2023
Books chosen by the guests are Animals (2014) by Emma Jane Unsworth (Ben Miller), I Know Why The Caged Bird Sings (1969) by Maya Angelou (Kerry Godliman), Out of Love (2020) by Hazel Hayes (Laura Smyth) and Between the World and Me (2015) by Ta-Nehisi Coates (Nish Kumar). The new book from 2023 is Devil’s Breath by Jill Johnson, and the Booker Prize book is Any Human Heart (2002) by William Boyd.
6	Bill Paterson, Ellie Taylor, Geri Halliwell-Horner, and Miles Jupp	Tim Van Someren	11 December 2023
Books chosen by the guests are Cannery Row (1945) by John Steinbeck (Bill Paterson), The Stranding (2021) by Kate Sawyer (Ellie Taylor), The Book Thief (2006) by Markus Zusak (Geri Halliwell-Horner) and The Marriage Portrait (2022) by Maggie O'Farrell (Miles Jupp). The new book from 2023 is The Unspeakable Acts of Zina Pavlou by Eleni Kyriacou, and the Booker Prize book is Redhead by the Side of the Road (2020) by Anne Tyler.

=== Series Eight (2024) ===
Sara Cox talks to guest stars about their favourite books as well as a book of the week pick from 2024.

2024

- All the Colours of the Dark by Chris Whitaker
- Glorious Exploits by Ferdia Lennon
- There are Rivers in the Sky by Elif Shafak
- Butter by Asako Yuzuki
- Whale Fall by Elizabeth O'Connor
- The Kellerby Code by Jonny Sweet

No.	Guest Stars	Directed by	Original air date
1	Alan Davies, Taj Atwal, Sara Pascoe, and Adrian Edmondson	Tim Van Someren	29 October 2024
Books chosen by the guests are Will and Testament (2016) by Vigdis Hjorth (Alan Davies), Demon Copperhead (2022) by Barbara Kingsolver (Taj Atwal), All Fours (2024) by Miranda July (Sara Pascoe) and You Are Here (2024) by David Nicholls (Adrian Edmondson). The new book from 2024 is All the Colours of the Dark by Chris Whitaker.
2	Stephen Mangan, Maisie Adam, Richard Ayoade, and Elizabeth Day	Tim Van Someren	5 November 2024
Books chosen by the guests are A Goat's Song (1994) by Dermot Healy (Stephen Mangan), In Cold Blood (1966) by Truman Capote (Maisie Adam), Tenth of December (2013) by George Saunders (Richard Ayoade) and The Light Years (1990) by Elizabeth Jane Howard (Elizabeth Day). The new book from 2024 is Glorious Exploits by Ferdia Lennon.
3	Neneh Cherry, Tom Allen, Olly Smith, and Sophie Raworth	Tim Van Someren	12 November 2024
Books chosen by the guests are Homegoing (2016) by Yaa Gyasi (Neneh Cherry), The Time Traveler's Wife (2003) by Audrey Niffenegger (Tom Allen), The Book Thief Nina Simone's Gum: A Memoir of Things Lost and Found (2021) by Warren Ellis (Olly Smith) and Trails and Tribulations: The Running Adventures of Susie Chan (2024) by Susie Chan (Sophie Raworth). The new book from 2024 is There Are Rivers in the Sky by Elif Shafak.
4	Graham Norton, Cariad Lloyd, Jack Edwards, and Meera Syal	Tim Van Someren	19 November 2024
Books chosen by the guests are So Long, See You Tomorrow (1979) by William Maxwell (Graham Norton), Persuasion (1817) by Jane Austen (Cariad Lloyd), Evenings and Weekends (2024) by Oisin McKenna (Jack Edwards) and Somebody I Used to Know (2018) by Wendy Mitchell (Meera Syal). The new book from 2024 is Butter by Asako Yuzuki.
5	Sir Trevor McDonald, Gemma Whelan, Neil Delamere, and Jo Brand	Tim Van Someren	26 November 2024
Books chosen by the guests are A Promised Land (2020) by Barack Obama (Sir Trevor McDonald), Engleby (2007) by Sebastian Faulks (Gemma Whelan), Leonard and Hungry Paul (2019) by Rónán Hession (Neil Delamere) and Big Sky (2019) by Kate Atkinson (Jo Brand). The new book from 2024 is Whale Fall by Elizabeth O’Connor.
6	Richard Osman, Ranvir Singh, Ben Miller, and Alex Jones	Tim Van Someren	3 December 2024
Final episode. Books chosen by the guests are Trustee from the Toolroom (1960) by Nevil Shute (Richard Osman), Ghosted (2021) by Jenn Ashworth (Ranvir Singh), The Wager (2023) by David Grann (Ben Miller) and A Court of Thorns and Roses (2015) by Sarah J. Maas (Alex Jones). The new book from 2024 is The Kellerby Code by Jonny Sweet.

== Cancellation ==
On 9 August 2025, the BBC announced it had axed Between the Covers after eight series and it would not return for a ninth series in the autumn.
