= Gooley =

Gooley may refer to:

- 8202 Gooley, a minor planet

== People with the surname ==
- Barry Gooley (born 1956), astronomy shop president, after whom the minor planet is named
- Dan Gooley (fl. 1967-2014), American baseball coach
- Dana Gooley, musicologist, writer on Liszt and Lisztomania
- Michael Gooley, founder of UK travel agency Trailfinders
- Nikki Gooley (fl. 1988-2009), make-up artist
- Russell Gooley, 2005 Australian X-Factor contestant
- Tristan Gooley (born 1973), British natural navigator and writer
- Walter Gooley (born 1934), American politician from Maine
