= Emilia Hart =

British-Australian novelist

Emilia Hart is a British-Australian novelist.

== Biography ==
Hart was born in Sydney and educated at Barker College. She studied law and English at the University of New South Wales and became a lawyer. In her mid-20s, she moved to London. Her grandfather is the novelist and playwright Barry Oakley. At 26, after suffering a stroke, she decided to write a novel.

== Writing ==
=== Weyward ===
Hart began writing her debut novel, Weyward, while living in Cumbria, where the novel is set. She drew comparisons between the Pendle Witch Trials of 1612 and the rise in violence against women during the COVID-19 lockdown, remarking that "the two seemed horribly linked".

Weyward was published in the UK in February 2023, and in the United States in March 2023, where it became a New York Times bestseller. It was described as an "entertaining read" by The Times. Kirkus Reviews called it "thoughtful and at times harrowing". On BBC's Between The Covers, it was praised as a "spellbinding debut novel". In May 2023, The New York Times included the book in its summer roundup of historical fiction.

=== The Sirens ===
Hart's second novel, The Sirens, was published on 13 February 2025. The novel, loosely based on various myths of sirens, mermaids and selkies, is set in Australia, Ireland and aboard a doomed 19th-century British prison ship bound for New South Wales. Like Weyward, this novel has several interconnected female narrators and blends historical fiction with magical realism and a contemporary take on traditional folk tales.

== Awards and honours ==
Weyward won two Goodreads Choice Awards in December 2023, for Best Debut Novel and Best Historical Fiction, receiving 45,000 and 62,000 votes in each category, respectively.

== Bibliography ==
=== Novels ===
- Weyward (2023) ISBN 9781250280800
- The Sirens (2025) ISBN 9781250390219

=== Short stories ===
- "Apples" (Featured in Of the Flesh (2024) ISBN 9780008697372)
