= Suicide prevention and intervention in India =

Suicide prevention and intervention efforts in India are in the nascent stage. According to the World Health Organization (WHO), suicide in India is a serious public health issue but it can be prevented with timely interventions that are based on evidence. Suicide prevention is also one of the United Nations Sustainable Development Goals (SDG3.4.2) wherein they have asked member countries to work towards reduce global suicide rates by one third by 2030. Notable steps taken by the Government of India include the decriminalization of suicide in the Mental HealthCare Act of 2017 and launching of India's first mental health toll free helpline KIRAN. Many experts have emphasised the urgent need for a national strategy for suicide prevention to be implemented that is multi-sectoral in nature.

Fortunately, India released its first national suicide prevention strategy in November 2022. According to a journal article authored by Dr. Vikas Arya (The University of Melbourne), "the national strategy outlines various objectives, key stakeholders, and timeframes by which the objectives should ideally be achieved. The Ministry of Health and Welfare has been recognized as the key organization in ensuring the adoption of the plan at the national level, while various other ministries (e.g., the Ministry of Education, the Ministry of Social Justice and Empowerment, and the Ministry of Agriculture) and stakeholders (e.g., state and local governments, NGOs, community-level health workers, academics, and the media) are identified as key actors. It is hoped that all these various ministries and stakeholders will come together to implement the plan successfully at the national, state, and local levels. The strategy draws on the World Health Organization's (WHO) model of a multisectoral approach to suicide prevention with the goal of reducing suicide mortality by 10 % in India by 2030". He also suggests that "while the first national suicide prevention strategy of India highlights the importance of both public health and health care strategies, given the lack of resources in the health care system of India, public health strategies for suicide prevention should be prioritized including restriction of lethal means (e.g., ban on lethal pesticides), gatekeeper training and awareness programs in various different settings (e.g., schools), responsible reporting of suicide among different media platforms, and improving the quality of suicide surveillance data".

== Government Initiatives ==
=== Decriminalization of suicide ===
The Mental Health Care Act 2017 negated laws of Section 309 of the Indian Penal Code and stated that attempting suicide is not a crime. The person attempting suicide is believed to be under a lot of stress and does not warrant punishment. Furthermore, the act announces provisions such as access to free healthcare and rehabilitation for people who attempt suicide.

=== Kiran ===
Ministry of Social Justice & Empowerment launched KIRAN (1800-599-0019), a toll-free 24/7 mental health helpline in September 2020 to help individuals in need of mental health support. The aim of the helpline, which was developed by the Department of Empowerment of Persons with Disabilities (DEPwD) is to provide psychological support in the wake of increasing distress and psychosocial vulnerabilities due to the COVID-19 pandemic.

The helpline will provide services such as screening, mental health first aid, crisis management and referrals to other mental health professionals. Over 600 clinical psychologists and psychiatrists are involved in the helpline. Calls can be made in 13 languages: Hindi, Assamese, Tamil, Marathi, Odia, Telugu, Malayalam, Gujarati, Punjabi, Kannada, Bengali, Urdu and English.

=== Compensation for family members of Covid positive suicide victims ===
On September 23, 2021, the Union Government of India said that they are considering providing monetary assistance to bereaved family members of individuals who died by suicide within thirty days of being diagnosed with Covid. This took place after the Supreme Court's advice to include suicide deaths as being caused by distress from COVID-19.

=== Suicide Prevention Policy ===
Madhya Pradesh government has started working to formulate the India's first suicide prevention policy by taking serious note of suggestion letter given by eminent psychiatrist Dr Satyakant Trivedi who runs a campaign against suicide "Say Yes To Life".

On the State's existing suicide-prevention infrastructure, Vishvas Sarang, the Minister of Medical Education, said that the latest initiative is not aimed specifically for the state but the government viewed the problem as universal and the strategy would suggest measures to reduce the instances everywhere in the country.

“Suicide is undoubtedly a big problem in society and every section of it is affected by it. We witness frequent cases of suicide, and this is definitely linked to mental health. To check this and find a solution to this problem, we have come up with an extensive action plan,” said Minister.

=== Community programs ===
Centre for Mental Health Law and Policy (CMHLP) work to implement evidence backed suicide prevention interventions in rural India through their Suicide Prevention and Implementation Research Initiative (SPIRIT).

Interventions include training youth and making them aware of mental health, safely storing pesticides and training community people to identify and support at-risk individuals.

In collaboration with Sangath, Quicksand Design Studio, Centre for Mental Health Law and Policy (CMHLP) are leading a program called iOutlive! where suicides among young people in Urban India belonging to marginalized and deprived identities will be addressed. Interventions include resource sharing, campaigns and chat based peer support services.

=== Gatekeeper training ===
Suicide Prevention India Foundation (SPIF) have collaborated with the QPR institute to offer gate keeping training in India. This training aims to equip members of the public with basic knowledge about the signs of suicide and first aid skills so that they can identify and support a person undergoing a suicide crisis. SPIF is also working to create a community of gatekeepers in India so that help is more accessible to those who need it.

=== National Alliance for Suicide Prevention ===
Mariwala Health Initiative has announced a National Alliance to bring together individuals from multiple sectors including research and policy to work towards a common goal of suicide prevention. They aim to support community based interventions and prioritise the lived experiences of individuals. They've also published a report titled 'Suicide Prevention: Changing the Narrative' where the Indian scenario is summarised.

=== Helplines ===
Many organizations run helplines to provide immediate support to individuals facing suicidal thoughts or urges. Please see List of suicide crisis lines.

=== Centralized pesticide-storage facility ===
Vijayakumar and colleagues (supported by the Sneha Suicide Prevention Centre in India and WHO) constructed two centralized storage facilities in two villages in Tamil Nadu as an effort to reduce pesticide-related suicides. Farmers could store their pesticides in storage boxes (similar to a bank locker) and they could access their pesticide-storage boxes with the key to their own locker. There was a significant reduction in pesticide suicides in the villages where this facility was constructed compared to other villages in Tamil Nadu.

Few state government in India like Madhyapradesh has started thinking about the concept of pesticide banks.
