= Spellbound (Green novel) =

2003 novel by Jane Green

- Author: Jane Green
- Language: English
- Genre: Chick lit
- Published: 2003 Michael Joseph
- Publication place: United Kingdom
- Pages: 448
- ISBN: 978-0-7181-4464-7

Spellbound is the British title of a 2003 novel by Jane Green, which was published in America under the title To Have and to Hold.

== Synopsis ==
Alice is a formerly mousy and high-strung London girl who marries Joe, a wealthy business executive whom she had a crush on as a girl. It is revealed that Joe is a serial philanderer who, in spite of his best efforts, is unable to avoid chasing women. He married Alice because he viewed her as a compliant "project" he could craft into the perfect trophy wife. In this, he succeeded. As Alice intermittently suspects Joe is having affairs she becomes unhappy with her marriage, which is blessed with enormous wealth and prestige but has no warmth or passion.

Joe becomes increasingly involved with a new business executive named Josie, and their relationship is discovered. Joe is forced by the company to relocate to its New York office or lose his job. Desperate, Joe convinces his wife of the merits of moving to the United States and she agrees to the move on the condition that they have a house in the country as well as their original apartment in New York City.

After the move Alice becomes increasingly invigorated and secure with herself as she takes on the project of restoring an old country home to immaculate condition. Joe, a fastidious urbanite, dislikes being in the country and the couple begins growing apart from one another: Joe spends more and more time in the city alone, but Alice no longer misses him as much because she feels increasingly fulfilled with small-town life and her new friends.

Alice's longtime best friend, Emily, visits her and brings along her boyfriend, Harry, whom Alice and Joe met back in England before the move. Emily reveals that she no longer thinks Harry is "the one" and is instead enamored with a man named Colin...who has a girlfriend. Alice is aghast that her friend would consider infidelity and advises her to give Harry a chance.

As the lengthy visit continues and Emily and Harry share Alice and Joe's country home with them, Alice and Harry grow close. Eventually, on the night Joe is finally rejected by his latest extramarital pursuit and all four are at a local party, Alice and Harry kiss under the stars while intoxicated. Emily sees Alice and Harry kissing and renounces her friendship with Alice. She and Harry return to England the next day as planned, where they promptly end their relationship.

Days later, Josie has moved to New York as well and contacts Joe, who immediately falls for her once more. They continue their extramarital relationship, but Alice quickly discovers it by checking Joe's e-mail accounts. Alice separates from Joe, who suffers a nervous breakdown in his New York apartment while Alice remains in their country home.

In the end, Alice and Emily reconcile and Emily encourages Alice to start a relationship with Harry, whom she obviously fancies. She does so.

== Response ==
Emma Hagestadt of The Independent said that the book "gamely subverts the [chick lit] genre by looking at what happens when Mr Right turns into Mr Wrong and when the heroine finds unexpected redemption in natural hair colour and orthopaedic shoes." Deirdre Donahue of USA Today commended the book to single women envious of their friends wedded bliss with the observation that "marriage to Mr. Apparently Perfect has rarely been so deliciously depicted as a very unwise concept." Spellbound topped the Original Fiction section of the Daily Telegraph's best-seller list on 26 January 2003 dropping to third place by 2 March 2003. To Have and to Hold was placed 29th in the Hardcover section of the New York Times Best seller list for 25 July 2004. In 2008 Spellbound was voted 16th greatest holiday read of all time by 2,000 female customers of Play.com.
