= Rob Delaney =

American comedian and actor (born 1977)

- Delaney in 2026
- Born: January 19, 1977 (age 49); Boston, Massachusetts, US
- Citizenship: United States; United Kingdom
- Occupations: Comedian; actor; writer; activist
- Years active: 2003–present
- Spouse: Leah Delaney
- Children: 4 (Note: One child is deceased.)
- Website: robdelaney.com

Robert Thomas Delaney (born January 19, 1977) is an American and British comedian, actor, writer, and activist. He is best known for co-creating and starring as Rob Norris in the sitcom Catastrophe (2015–2019), and Peter in the superhero films Deadpool 2 (2018) and Deadpool & Wolverine (2024).

Delaney has also appeared in the films Hobbs & Shaw (2019), Bombshell (2019), Tom & Jerry (2021), Home Sweet Home Alone (2021), The School for Good and Evil (2022), Mission: Impossible – Dead Reckoning Part One (2023), and Love at First Sight (2023).

== Early life ==
Delaney was born in Boston, Massachusetts, on January 19, 1977, the son of Nancy and Robert Delaney. He grew up in Marblehead, Massachusetts. He is of Irish descent. He attended New York University's Tisch School of the Arts and graduated with a degree in musical theater in 1999.

== Career ==
=== Twitter ===
Delaney came to the attention of the public via Twitter, where he began posting in 2009. By 2016, he had over 1.2 million followers. While other comics were hesitant to share their material on social media, he is considered one of the first comedians to use social media to publish jokes. He credited Irish comedy writer Graham Linehan with his rise in popularity after Linehan began responding to his tweets. In 2010, Paste magazine named Delaney one of the 10 funniest people on Twitter. In May 2012, he became the first comedian to win the award for "Funniest Person on Twitter" at The Comedy Awards.

=== Writing ===
Delaney has written articles for Vice and The Guardian. His book Rob Delaney: Mother. Wife. Sister. Human. Warrior. Falcon. Yardstick. Turban. Cabbage. was published by Spiegel & Grau in November 2013. His memoir A Heart That Works, about the loss of his two-and-a-half-year-old son Henry to brain cancer, was published by Spiegel & Grau in 2022.

=== Acting ===
==== Film ====
In the film Deadpool 2 (2018), Delaney played Peter Wisdom, an average middle-aged man who has no superpowers and joins Deadpool's X-Force. As part of the film's promotion, a Twitter account was launched in Peter's name.

Throughout 2019, Delaney had a series of cameos in Hollywood blockbuster films. He reteamed with director David Leitch and actor Dwayne Johnson for Hobbs & Shaw, in which he appeared as Agent Loeb. He appeared as a theater director in Paul Feig's comedy-drama Last Christmas. Both movies went to No. 1 at the UK box office. He also appeared opposite Anne Hathaway in The Hustle as Todd and the Fox News drama Bombshell co-starring Charlize Theron. He filmed a cameo as Elvis Presley in Dexter Fletcher's Elton John musical biopic Rocketman, which was omitted from the theatrical cut. It was also reported that he would appear opposite Reynolds another time, in Pokémon: Detective Pikachu. However, he did not appear in the final film. In September 2019 he was cast in The Good House opposite Sigourney Weaver and Kevin Kline.

==== Television ====
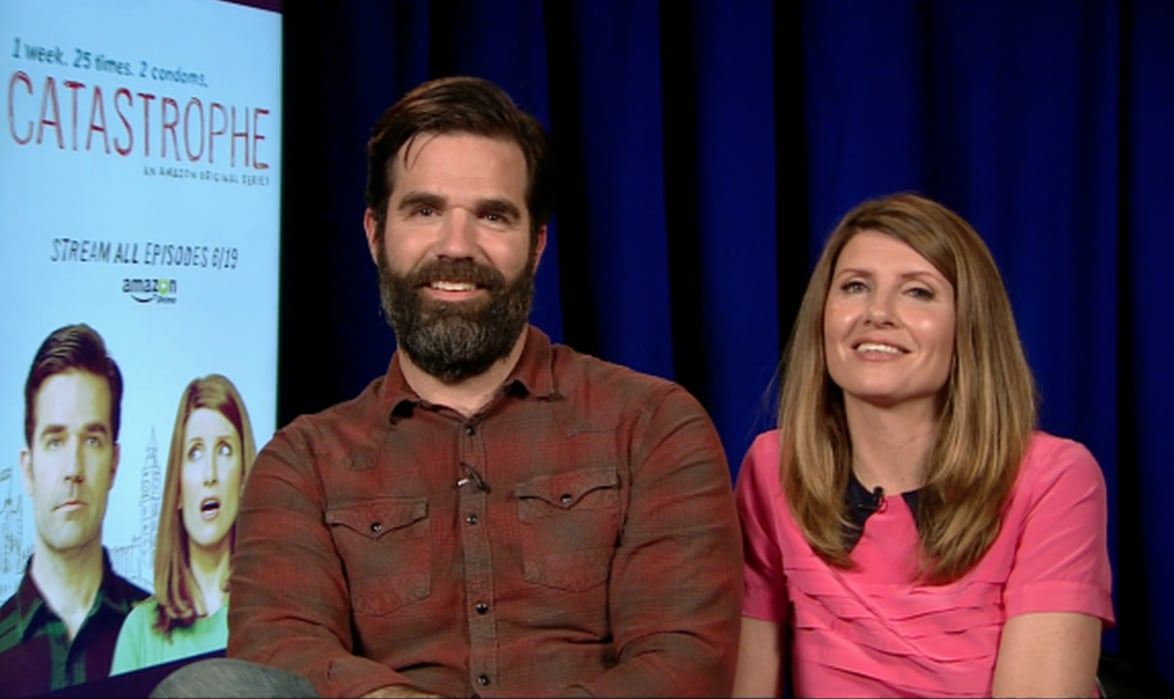
Delaney and Sharon Horgan being interviewed about Catastrophe in 2015

In December 2011, Comedy Central announced that Delaney would shoot a pilot for a variety show, called @RobDelaney. However, the series was not picked up. Instead, Delaney moved on to co-write and co-star with Sharon Horgan in Catastrophe, that began airing in the UK on January 19, 2015, on Channel 4. The show follows their characters after they get together following a brief affair while he is in the UK on business, and then moves there permanently after he learns that she has become pregnant. It debuted in the United States on Amazon in June 2015. The program ended after four seasons. Channel 4 aired the concluding episode on February 12, 2019, while Amazon announced the US release date to be March 15 of the same year. The series earned him his first Emmy Award nomination, for "Outstanding Comedy Writing".

Since moving to the UK in 2014, Delaney has appeared on several British panel shows, including Have I Got News for You, Would I Lie to You?, 8 Out of 10 Cats, The Big Fat Quiz of the Year and Room 101. In 2016, he appeared on Travel Man as a guest host for the Spanish city of Seville, and in March 2021, he was the guest announcer on Ant & Dec's Saturday Night Takeaway.

In 2024, Delaney portrayed the villainous Nick Stripling in the first season of Bad Monkey. Delaney played recurring character Josh/Neighbor Guy in the 2025 Showtime miniseries Dying for Sex starring Michelle Williams and Jenny Slate, for which he received a Primetime Emmy Award nomination.

== Personal life ==
Delaney resides in London with his wife Leah; they have had four sons together. In February 2018, Delaney revealed that their two-and-a-half-year-old son Henry had died the previous month, having received extensive treatment for a brain tumor since 2016. The film Deadpool & Wolverine, in which Delaney appears as Peter, is dedicated to Henry's memory. The couple's fourth son was born in August 2018. In 2020, Delaney wrote about getting a vasectomy. Since 2024, he has been a UK citizen.

Delaney has publicly shared his experience with multiple health concerns, including depression and alcoholism. In 2002, he blacked out while driving and crashed into a building owned by the Los Angeles Department of Water and Power. He broke his left wrist and right arm, and had both of his knees gashed to the bone. This prompted him to stop drinking.

In 2018, Delaney became the first presenter on the CBeebies Bedtime Stories programme to tell a story in Makaton, which he used to communicate with his late son Henry.

On Sara Cox's show Between the Covers, Delaney chose the short story collection A Manual for Cleaning Women by Lucia Berlin as one of his favorite books.

Delaney is an atheist.

== Political views ==
In 2016, Delaney became a member of the Democratic Socialists of America.

In June 2017 he endorsed the Labour Party in the 2017 general election, despite being unable to vote as a non-UK citizen (but longtime resident). In November 2018, he supported a petition organized by Labour campaign group Momentum calling on Labour MPs to vote against the EU withdrawal agreement which had been negotiated by Theresa May's government.

In November 2019, Delaney joined other public figures in signing a letter supporting Labour Party leader Jeremy Corbyn, describing him as "a beacon of hope in the struggle against emergent far-right nationalism, xenophobia and racism in much of the democratic world" and endorsed him in the 2019 general election. In December 2019, along with 42 other public figures, he signed a letter endorsing the Labour Party under Corbyn's leadership in the 2019 general election. The letter stated that "Labour's election manifesto under Jeremy Corbyn's leadership offers a transformative plan that prioritises the needs of people and the planet over private profit and the vested interests of a few".

In June 2024 in the run-up to the 2024 general election, Delaney again expressed his support for Jeremy Corbyn, this time backing his campaign to be re-elected as the MP for Islington North, as an independent candidate following his departure from the Labour Party.

== Filmography ==
Key
†	Denotes works that have not yet been released

=== Film ===
Year	Work	Role	Notes
2007	Wild Girls Gone	Whipped Cream Ass Man	
2014	Life After Beth	News Anchor	
2018	Deadpool 2	Peter	
2019	The Hustle	Todd	
2019	Rocketman	Elvis Presley	Deleted scene
2019	Hobbs & Shaw	Agent Loeb	
2019	Last Christmas	Theatre Director	
2019	Bombshell	Gil Norman	
2021	Tom & Jerry	Henry Dubros	
2021	Wrath of Man	Boss Blake Halls	
2021	The Good House	Peter Newbold	
2021	Ron's Gone Wrong	Andrew Morris (voice)	
2021	Home Sweet Home Alone	Jeff McKenzie	
2022	The Bubble	Marti	
2022	The School for Good and Evil	Stefan	
2023	Northern Comfort	Ralph	
2023	Mission: Impossible – Dead Reckoning Part One	JSOC	
2023	Love at First Sight	Andrew Sullivan	
2024	Argylle	Deputy Director Powell	
2024	Deadpool & Wolverine	Peter	
2025	Bank of Dave 2: The Loan Ranger	Carlo Mancini	
2025	The Occupant	John	
2026	Primate	Dr. Doug Lambert	Uncredited cameo
2026	Being Heumann	Congressman George Miller	
2026	Wildwood	Samuel	voice
2027	Animal Friends †	TBA	Post-production
2027	Road House 2 †	TBA	Post-production

=== Television ===
Year	Work	Role	Notes
2009	Coma, Period.	Dan Humford	10 episodes
2009	Outer Space Astronauts	Commander Cake	Episode: "One Year Ago"
2010	This Week in Comedy	Himself	Episode: "Karen Kilgariff/Rob Delaney"
2011	The Smoking Gun Presents: World's Dumbest	Himself	6 episodes
2012	Key & Peele	Various	3 episodes
2012	First Dates with Toby Harris	Brad	Episode: "Ex-Girlfriends"
2013	Rob Delaney Live at the Bowery Ballroom	Himself	Television special; also executive producer
2013	Cougar Town	Guide	Episode: "Have Love Will Travel"
2013	Burning Love	Kirk	3 episodes
2014	The Michael J. Fox Show	Clete Matthews	Episode: "Biking"
2015–2019	Catastrophe	Rob Norris	24 episodes; also co-creator, co-writer, and executive producer
2016	Travel Man: 48 Hours In	Himself	Episode: "Seville"
2018	Action Team	Victor	Episode: "Super Mega Robot"
2018	Trust	Lansing	Episode: "Kodachrome"
2018	Danger Mouse	Night Knight (voice)	Episode: "Daylight Savings Crime"
2018	Bitz & Bob	Bevel (voice)	41 episodes
2021	Ant & Dec's Saturday Night Takeaway	Guest Announcer	2 episodes
2021	No Activity	Magnolia (voice)	2 episodes
2021	Between the Covers	Himself	Episode #2.2
2021–2022	Fairfax	Grant (voice)	7 episodes
2021–2022	Birdgirl	Brian O'Brien (voice)	12 episodes
2021–2025	The Great North	Brian Tobin (voice)	5 episodes
2022	Ant and Dec's Saturday Night Takeaway	The Devil	3 episodes
2022	The Man Who Fell to Earth	Hatch Flood	8 episodes
2022–2024	Big Nate	Martin Wright, Various voices (voices)	23 episodes
2023	The Power	Tom	2 episodes
2023	Black Mirror	Mac	Episode: "Joan Is Awful"
2023–2024	Invincible	Nuolzot / Séance Dog (voice)	2 episodes
2024	Dinner with the Parents	Jimmy Spiegel	2 episodes
2024	Bad Monkey	Nick Stripling/Christopher	Main cast
2025	Dying for Sex	Neighbor Guy	Main cast
2026	Ponies	Stanley	Episode: "Night Moves"
2026	Furious	Oliver Charles	2 episodes
2026	Max & the Midknights	Martin Wright (voice)	Episode: "The Great Crossover"

=== Audio ===
Year	Title	Role	Notes
2024	The Mysterious Affair at Styles	Alfred Inglethorp	Audible original
