= Play to the End =

2004 novel by Robert Goddard

- Author: Robert Goddard
- Language: English
- Genre: Crime fiction / Thriller
- Publisher: Bantam Press
- Publication date: 2004
- Publication place: United Kingdom
- Media type: Print (Hardback & Paperback)
- Pages: 369 pp.
- ISBN: 978-0-593-04760-6
- OCLC: 56446197

Play to the End is a crime novel by Robert Goddard first published in 2004. It is set in Brighton in December 2002 and revolves around a local entrepreneur whose wealth may be based on shady practices carried out by his family business at some point in the past.

== Plot summary ==
Middle-aged actor Toby Flood is touring the South of England with a recently discovered play by Joe Orton called Lodger in the Throat. When the company arrive in Brighton for a one-week run at the Theatre Royal, Flood is confident that he will be able to use his stay to get in touch with his estranged wife Jenny, who has filed for divorce and is now living with Roger Colborn, a local businessman, on the outskirts of the city. Flood is surprised to find that it is Jenny who contacts him first: She tells him she is being stalked and, as she believes that her husband is to blame for it, asks him to do something about it.

This is how Flood meets Derek Oswin, the alleged stalker, an eccentric man his own age who, just like his deceased father and grandfather before him, worked for the Colborns' family business until its liquidation in 1989. It turns out Oswin has written a history of the company but so far has not found a publisher. Talking to Oswin and to other people he meets, either by chance or by design, Flood more and more gets the impression that Roger Colborn is a dangerous man who has something to hide, and that Jenny must be saved from the clutches of the Colborn family before it is too late.

Thus, Flood's interest in the affairs of the now-defunct company is fuelled by his desire to win back Jenny, to the point that his professional life is affected. Trying to dig up dirt on the Colborns, he is drawn into a quagmire of events he cannot make head or tail of and eventually misses an evening's performance without giving any notice. When, however, on the following day he finds his understudy—the man who saved his neck the previous night—dead in the streets of Brighton he realizes the seriousness of the situation. In the course of one week homes are broken into, evidence is stolen, several people die, family secrets are uncovered, and an inheritance is reclaimed. Justice triumphs in the end.
