= Amanda Ross (television executive) =

British television executive

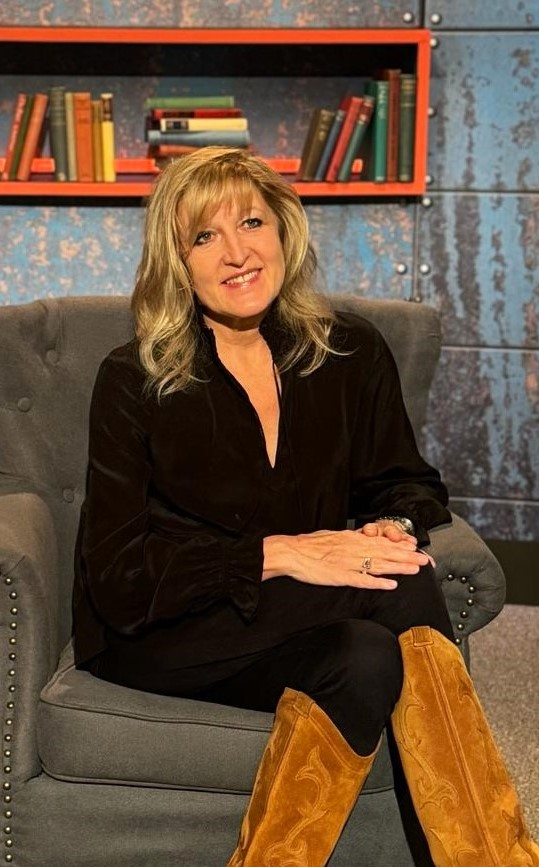
Amanda Ross on the set of Between the Covers Series 7

Amanda Ross is a prominent British television executive known for her significant contributions to the television industry, particularly in developing long running formats, food and book-related programming.

She is co-founder and CEO of Cactus TV, a production company she founded with her husband Simon Ross in 1994. Cactus specialises in broad-based entertainment, features and chat shows, making programmes for many major UK broadcasters, including the BBC, ITV, UKTV and Channel 4. In a recent Broadcast Independent Survey 2023, Cactus was ranked as the fourth biggest supplier to the BBC and the fifth biggest supplier to ITV by hours.

Always closely involved in her productions, Amanda has won a Royal Television Society Award and been nominated for four others as a producer and a director. Amanda has been instrumental in creating and maintaining many long running TV programme brands including Saturday Kitchen for over 18 years (2006 – ongoing), Between The Covers for 8 series (2020-ongoing), and Richard & Judy, 5 nights a week for 8 years (2001–2009).

Before founding her own production company, Amanda worked for many major TV companies, including ITV, BBC, and American channel VH1 - producing, presenting, and creating formats.

She made her network debut as a presenter on the ITV Telethon in 1988 and has since hosted many shows including her own gameshow format Follow Your Nose (ITV, 1992) and Intuition (Anglia, 1999). Most recently, she also hosted a live stage tour of Between The Covers, presented awards and made several podcast and radio appearances.

== Early life and education ==
Amanda Ross (née Stevens) grew up in Pitsea, Essex, alongside her two brothers. They lived on a small holding with their grandparents overlooking the Thames estuary and kept a variety of animals.

Unfortunately, due to plans to create a new road, their home was compulsorily purchased. Her parents divorced when she was 11 and she moved many times after that, living in several council estates in the area. She pursued her passion for drama and completed 3 A levels at SEEVIC in Thundersley.

Between Sixth form and university she worked in a bank, and later as an au pair for a family in Paris. At their properties in the South of France, she taught herself to properly cook, and regularly prepared dinners for 20 people.

She received a BA (Hons) in Drama and Theatre Arts at Birmingham University, where she fostered her ambition to be a children's presenter. Whilst at Birmingham she performed in 3 successful plays at the Edinburgh Fringe, including playing Celia in Volpone and singing and performing comedy in a sellout revue style show. Amanda was the first person in her family to go to university.

== Career ==
=== Early career ===
Shortly before graduating in 1984, Amanda got a job as trainee/researcher at Central Television. Here she earned her first TV credits, writing and working on make & do and cookery items for Saturday Starship. After a year in the role, she toured Germany as a singer with a 30-piece big band in order to get an Equity card to further progress her performing career.

When she returned to the UK, she produced a variety of music and entertainment shows, including the Roxy, Catchphrase, and Chain Letters. She went on to work on many live children's shows including, No 73, Get Fresh, Gimme 5, Motormouth and Ghost Train.

She realised her dream of becoming a children's TV presenter once she had already been working for years as a producer. At job interviews, she was put under pressure to pick one or the other, but Amanda persisted as she loved doing both. She presented and produced on Children's ITV shows Docurama: Shooting Stars (1990) and Follow Your Nose (1992). Follow Your Nose was a gameshow format devised by Amanda Ross. In it, a team of children were set challenges around different tourist attractions. Each successfully completed challenge would earn the team a letter tile. At the end of the show, the children had to rearrange their letter tiles to quickly guess the ‘puzzleword’ related to where they were. If their guess took less than 30 seconds, the team would win a prize.

She went on to work on Mouse Trap (1991–1992) as producer writing games, puzzles and successfully reformatting the show and producing 75 show series for German transmission, as Maus Reiss Aus on RTL Germany. The new format was later sold to Holland and Greece.

She started her own TV production company Cheeky Productions in 1993. The first commission was a televised special on The Royal Premiere of The Fugitive attended by Princess Diana. The programme was presented by Amanda Ross, Andrew O’Connor and Iain Johnstone, and featured interviews with Harrison Ford, Arnold Kopelson, Andrew Davis and Clint Eastwood.

She produced and directed film packages for This Morning, Good Morning Anne and Nick, Film ’93, What's Up Doc, London Tonight, The Little Picture Show and Sky News. She coordinated booking of US talent for Jonathan Ross Presents (BBC 1 & VH1) and made live appearances on GMTV and The Time The Place.

=== Cactus TV ===
In 1994, she founded Cactus TV, with fellow TV Producer and husband, Simon Ross. Cactus TV secured an unprecedented number of commissions from different channels in their first few years, and continued to gain a reputation as a dependable, hard-working indie under Amanda and Simon's leadership. She created and produced a diverse array of entertaining and popular programming across numerous genres—from low-budget channel interstitials and high-volume studio-based quizzes to large-scale TV events, award shows and musical spectaculars like Songs of Bond, The British Soap Awards and The British Book Awards.

In the first five years, Cactus created and produced many quiz and game shows, including Incognito (BBC1, 2 series, 87 episodes), King of the Castle (ITV, 19 episodes), It's Anybody's Guess (ITV, 40 episodes), Sports Anorak of the Year (UK Gold, 2 series, 64 episodes), Intuition (Anglia TV), Upshot (Anglia), and Morphit (BBC1).

Intuition saw Amanda Ross make a return to presenting. The ten-episode light entertainment series aired in 1999 on Anglia TV. In it, four contestants had to use their intuition to match improbable facts to fellow contestants.

For the youth market, Cactus created the lively current affairs discussion show Mad For It (ITV), which was nominated for three RTS Awards, and Off The Wall (Anglia). Other youth-oriented series included Pop-elganger (UK PLAY), For Your Ears Only (UK PLAY), and The TV Set (LWT).

Most prominently during this time period, Cactus created and produced The British Soap Awards, originally hosted by Richard Madeley and Judy Finnegan from 1999 to 2002. This was an annual awards ceremony celebrating the best moments in British soap operas, and was the highest-rated entertainment show for 3 successive years on any TV channel, capturing a remarkable 53% audience share, amounting in 12.8 million people tuning in. The format continues to be produced by ITV.

=== Richard & Judy ===
Thanks to the close working relationship developed during the production of The British Soap Awards, Amanda became aware that Richard & Judy had begun to feel unhappy at ITV, after 13 years of working on This Morning.

In May 2001, Amanda made headlines when she secured a multi-million-pound deal for Richard & Judy to move to Channel 4. This was big news as the presenter pair became so closely associated with the brand of This Morning, that many viewers referred to the show as the Richard & Judy show rather than its original name. The commission brought Amanda and Cactus’ name to a new level of mainstream prominence as Richard & Judy insisted that they'd like to be exclusively signed with Cactus to produce the new show, and it became the biggest single commission by Channel 4 to an independent production company, and remains so.

Industry experts were sceptical about Richard & Judy presenting a later timeslot on Channel 4 as they felt that it would not fit with the young viewership the channel attracted, but Amanda and Simon worked hard to make the switch a success. After initial struggles with the ratings, the show steadily climbed in popularity, securing a renewal by Channel 4 at the end of their initial contract for an even more impressive sum.

For the next eight years, Richard & Judy broadcast live to the nation each weekday at 5pm, establishing the coveted ‘5 o’clock slot’ and consistently attracting over 2 million viewers. The show generated numerous media stories, welcomed a wide variety of celebrities, from Madonna to Bill & Hillary Clinton, and received nominations for both a Royal Television Society Award and an Indie Award. During this series run, Cactus consistently ranked in top 10 independent production companies in Britain.

In 2004, Amanda made headlines again when she introduced the idea of a TV Book club, hosted by Richard and Judy. Although there were initial doubts from TV bosses whether these shows would have the needed entertainment value, Amanda was emboldened by the success of Oprah in America. Her instinct was proven right when books featured on the programme enjoyed astronomical boosts in sales. The sales of ‘Starter For Ten’, David Nicholls debut novel, saw an 871% uplift in the week after it was discussed on the Book Club, and ‘Star Of The Sea’ by Joseph O’Connor had sales immediately multiply, going from just under 4000 books sold before transmission to over a million almost overnight. 'Star of the Sea' instantly went to No 1 in the Sunday Times Best Seller lists and stayed at the top of the charts for 13 weeks.

Amanda was responsible for all the book choices, and over the years helped make best sellers of authors, including David Nicholls, Kate Mosse and Victoria Hislop. Other notable choices included ‘The Lovely Bones’ by Alice Sebold, ‘The Time Traveler's Wife’ by Audrey Niffenegger, ‘Cloud Atlas’ by David Mitchell, ‘My Sister's Keeper’ by Jodi Picoult and ‘Restless’ by William Boyd.

Amanda never made any money from the sales, unlike her American counterparts, as that was the condition of promoting books on British television. However, her influence on book sales was recognised by publishers who hoped to have their books featured on her show, and she could request a change to a book's publication date or cover. She is credited as being responsible for changing the cover of Cecelia Ahern's ‘P.S. I Love You’ from pink to blue to make it more appealing to male readers, her choice propelled Ahern to an international Bestseller.

The Book Club also played a pivotal role in the creation of The British Book Awards, a televised event sponsored by Galaxy, then the National Book Awards sponsored by Specsavers. This event was broadcast annually on Channel 4 from 2004 to 2008 and on UKTV's entertainment channel Watch in 2009. Later, it led to the commission of ITV Crime Thriller Awards (2008 – 2014), which ran for six years on ITV with accompanying documentary series and book clubs. These awards were attended by many stars including Dame Helen Mirren, Benedict Cumberbatch, Ricky Gervais, and were hosted for the last three years by Bradley Walsh.

Ross booking policy and the stature of the show made it a destination for Hollywood stars. She secured exclusive interviews with the likes of Bill & Hillary Clinton, George Clooney, Tony Blair and Madonna. Ross coached Cherie Blair for her first TV guest appearance which was on the show in September 2004.

In October 2008, Cactus transferred Richard & Judy to UKTV's Watch, where their show continued to attract A-list celebrity guests until its final broadcast on July 1, 2009.

=== Saturday Kitchen ===
In 2006, Cactus won the tender to produce Saturday Kitchen, a live cooking and entertainment show on BBC One with a brand new format created by Simon and Amanda. Under Amanda and Simon's leadership the show got a fresh look from its initial seasons 2002-2006, with their new format points like 'Heaven & Hell' and the 'Omelette Challenge', and instantly became a slot winning success. The only retention from the previous incarnation was the name. Amanda Ross attracted a whole new line-up of chefs including some of the world's best, Michel Roux, Antonio Carluccio, Jamie Oliver, Angela Hartnett, Thomas Keller, Rick Stein, Nathan Outlaw, Marcus Wareing, Gennaro Contaldo, Ching-He Huang, Yotam Ottolenghi and Theo Randall.

Broadcast live from Cactus Studios every Saturday morning, the show features incredible dishes prepared by some of the world's top chefs, along with entertaining conversations with popular TV celebrities and the best clips from the BBC's food archive. Ross originally cast James Martin to host from June 2006 to March 2016. Matt Tebbutt currently hosts the series.

Recent guests include Kit Harrington, Danny Trejo, Mel B, Stanley Tucci, Rob Brydon, John Bishop, Gary Barlow, Mo Gilligan, Tom Allen, Dan Ackroyd, Paloma Faith, Hugh Bonneville, Jennifer Saunders, Antonio Banderas, Idris Elba and Dawn French.

The series has kept up slot winning ratings regularly delivering over 2 million viewers on a Saturday morning. In addition to its live broadcasts, Amanda was able to secure commissions for Saturday Kitchen spin-off series including Best Bites, Celebration Kitchen and Christmas Kitchen, further cementing its place as a beloved staple of British weekend television.

=== Cookery School ===
In 2013, Ross opened an award-winning cookery school with Michel Roux Jr. Described as "a destination for keen cooks and amateur chefs seeking insight, inspiration and instruction from a host of culinary luminaries", the school ran for five years and won Food & Travel: Cookery School of the Year Award in 2016.

=== Between The Covers ===
Since launching Richard & Judy Book Club, Amanda created and produced a significant number of book-based campaigns on TV, earning numerous awards for her contribution to the British publishing industry.

In 2020, Cactus announced another addition to their book-based TV offering – a primetime BBC Two series Between The Covers hosted by Sara Cox. In each episode, Sara is joined by four different celebrity guests who each bring a book they love, a BYOB that they want to persuade everyone else to read, and review curated new releases. The aim of the series was to encourage people to read for pleasure and was one of the few shows that was first produced during Covid lockdown restrictions. As with all book-related programming produced by Cactus TV, the new book picks of the series were ultimately selected by Amanda Ross.

The programme has been renewed year on year, and series 8 released in October 2024 with previous series available to view on BBC iPlayer.

As an expansion of the successful franchise, a live stage version of the TV series, Between The Covers Live! went on its first tour in June 2024, hosted by Amanda Ross. Amanda, who picks all the books for the television series was joined by three of the best loved stars from Between The Covers - Kacey Ainsworth, Jo Brand, Stephen Mangan and Bestselling author of ‘Star of the Sea’, Joseph O’Connor. The New Book Pick selected for this tour was 'Ministry of Time' by Kaliane Bradley, now a Sunday Times and New York Times Bestseller. Kaliane also joined them on stage to discuss her inspiration and writing process.

Amanda Ross said the idea for the tour, which spanned theatres in London, Oxford, Nottingham, Birmingham, Reading and Brighton, came from feedback from viewers that "the TV show is too short, and that they would love to join in the ultimate fantasy book group".

A bookshop was set up at each venue to give the audience an opportunity to buy the books discussed and speak more to the panel during book signings.

=== Credits ===
Amongst many others Amanda has produced:

Name	Channel	Year
Saturday Kitchen	BBC One	2006 - Ongoing
Saturday Kitchen Best Bites	BBC One	2016 - Ongoing
Celebration Kitchen	BBC One	2020 - Ongoing
Between The Covers	BBC Two	2020 - Ongoing
The Chris McCausland Show	ITV	2024
Big Zuu's Breakfast Show	ITV	2023
Laura Whitmore's Breakfast Show	ITV	2023
Vick Hope's Breakfast Show	ITV	2023
Oti Mabuse's Breakfast Show	ITV	2023
Katie Piper's Breakfast Show	ITV	2022 - 2024
Garraway's Good Stuff	ITV	2022
Go Veggie & Vegan With Matt Tebutt	Channel 5	2022
Martin & Roman's Weekend Best!	ITV	2021
Martin & Roman Sunday Best	ITV	2020
The Sara Cox Show	ITV	2019
Zoe Ball on Saturday/Sunday	ITV	2018
Modern Wheels or Classic Steals	UKTV	2018
Kitchen Garden Live with the Hairy Bikers	BBC	2017
John Torode's Malaysian Adventure	UKTV	2016
On Fame/Friendship/Romance	UKTV	2015
Weekend	ITV	2014 - 2017
Christmas Kitchen	BBC	2014 - 2016
A Taste of Britain	BBC	2014 - 2015
Spring Kitchen	Channel 4	2014
Munch Box	ITV	2013 - 2014
Roux Scholarship	UKTV	2013
Roux Masterclass	UKTV	2013
Crime Connections	ITV 3	2012
Madhur Jaffrey's Curry Nation	UKTV	2012
Drop Down Menu	Channel 4	2011
Fern	Channel 4	2011
10 Mile Menu	ITV	2011
Roux Legacy	UKTV	2011
Crime – A-Z of Crime	ITV3	2011
The TV Book Club	Channel 4	2010 - 2012
Booked: Stars Of The Galaxy Book Awards	Channel 4	2010 - 2011
Star Chefs (2010)		2010
Crime - The People's Detective	ITV 3	2010
Rachel Allen – Dinner Parties	RTE & UKTV	2010
The Hairy Bikers' Food Tour of Britain	BBC	2010
Celebrity Pressure Cooker	ITV	2010
Rachel Allen – Home Cooking	RTE & UKTV	2009
Richard & Judy	UKTV	2009
A Farewell To Floyd	BBC Two	2009
Crime Thriller Season and Awards	ITV 3	2008 - 2014
Rachel Allen – Bake	RTE & UKTV	2008
Richard & Judy Wine Club	Channel 4	2005
The National Book Awards		2004 - 2019
The Spirit of Diana: The Debate	Living TV	2003
Britain Into Europe	BBC	2002
Songs Of Bond	ITV	2002
Richard & Judy	Channel 4	2001 - 2008
Cliff Richard – The Hits I Missed	ITV	2001
Pop-Elganger	UKTV	2001
For Your Ears Only	UKTV	2001
The Real America	BBC	2001
King Of The Castle	ITV	2000
The Incredible Journey	BBC	2000
Men For Sale	ITV	1999
The British Soap Awards	ITV	1999 - 2002
Intuition	Anglia	1999
It's Anybody's Guess	ITV	1999
Foursite	Channel 4	1999 - 2000
In Search of Fame	BBC One	1999
The TV Set	LWT	1998
Off The Wall	ITV	1998
The Last Resort	Channel 4	1997
Sports Anorak Of The Year	UKTV	1997 - 1998
Rowland Rivron Bites The Bullet	UKTV	1996
Incognito	BBC	1995 - 1996
How To Deal With …	BBC One	1995

== Impact & Contributions ==
Under Amanda and Simon's leadership, Cactus ranked among the top ten suppliers of programming to the BBC & ITV by volume, according to industry reports.

In a recent Broadcast Independent Survey 2023, Cactus was ranked as the fourth biggest supplier to the BBC and the fifth biggest supplier to ITV by hours.

Amanda champions diversity on and off-camera, as is reflected by the range of chefs and presenters that have been featured in the programming she produces. Most recently, she secured a commission from ITV for The Chris McCausland Show (2024), the first chat show hosted by a blind person. Having featured Chris as a guest on other Cactus shows, Amanda identified his clear star power and pitched his own show to ITV. The show was nominated for a TV Choice Award.

This inclusive approach is also applied to Cactus’ ongoing shows. In 2024, Amanda produced the first ever ‘Pride Special’ on Saturday Kitchen, which was positively received by the press.

Ross oversees all of Cactus' book and writing initiatives, creating and producing a number of major book-based campaigns on TV, including Richard & Judy's Book Club (and associated Summer Read), the televising of The Galaxy National Book Awards and The Crime Thriller Awards, The Specsavers TV Book Club, The Zoe Ball Book Club and Between The Covers. In 2007 her book choices accounted for more than 26 per cent of all books sold in the UK, reportedly boosting the publishing trade by over £200 million.

Ross was named No 1 in The Observer newspaper's List of the 50 most powerful people in publishing. She won a British Book Trade Award for inspiring wider reading in 2006, and The Bookseller Award for expanding the market in 2006 and 2007, and an Outstanding Achievement Award in 2009. She received an RTS Educational Television Award in 2007 for her role in the Channel 4 "Lost for Words Season", which focused on children's literacy. She was voted in the top five of London's "Literary Life" in the Evening Standard's "1000 Most Influential People 2008".

In 2007, Red magazine ran a feature on Amanda calling her one of their ‘Red Hot’ women. They commended her abilities as a tastemaker, consistently championing thought-provoking, entertaining and compelling’ reads. Harper's Bazaar highlighted her contributions to TV and publishing, naming her one of Britain's Most Influential Women. At the time of publication one in every four of the top 100 books sold in the UK were amongst Amanda Ross’ picks.

She was also a trustee of the children's charity Kidscape, and on the UK Advisory Board for the charity Room to Read. She is an ambassador for Wellbeing of Women, and also for the National Literacy Trust.

Over the years, Amanda has acted as a judge on many BAFTA TV panels, Royal Television Society panels and gets regular mentions on industry podcasts, such as ‘The Rest Is Entertainment’.

== Personal life ==
Amanda resides in London with her husband, Simon Ross (TV executive producer, co-founder of Cactus TV, brother of Jonathan Ross) and their two adopted sons.

From a young age, Amanda loved keeping pets including many rescue cats, even naming her first TV production company after her dog Cheeky in 1993. In 2007, her dogs became the first canines to be mentioned in Who's Who when Amanda was entered, the same year as Kate Moss.

Amanda first met Simon in the late 1980s when visiting her former colleagues on Crosswits at Tyne Tees Television. They introduced her to Simon, who had taken over Amanda's role as puzzle writer and unlike her, was really enjoying it. They went on to work together on a variety of shows for 6 months but only began dating when Amanda left to work on a travel show at Granada TV. They got married in Northumberland in October 1990.

Having experienced professional success independent of one another and collaborated on a variety of projects, the pair started Cactus TV together in 1994. They attribute their successful working relationship to the fact they are interested in different aspects of the business and always respect and trust each other's knowledge and input on the way the company should be run.

Outside of their shared passion for producing television, Amanda and Simon enjoy taking on property renovation projects. In 2003, they purchased a property in Italy with a large olive grove. They renovated the property turning it into their dream home. Over time they also began producing small batches of their own olive oil that Amanda gifts to friends, chefs and special guests on Cactus TV productions. Theo Randall has used hundreds of litres in his restaurant. Yotam Ottalenghi is reported to have wanted to buy a batch of the olive oil for his delicatessen.

After a decade of undergoing fertility treatment, Amanda and Simon adopted two boys from the British care system in 2010. Amanda enjoys spending as much time as possible with her family, indulging her passions for cooking, eating, and entertaining.
