= Home Stretch =

Novel by Graham Norton

- First edition
- Author: Graham Norton
- Cover artist: Tom Haugomat
- Language: English
- Genre: Social novel; Family saga; Gay literature
- Publisher: Hodder & Stoughton
- Publication date: 2020
- Publication place: United Kingdom
- Pages: 368
- ISBN: 0-063-11209-4
- Dewey Decimal: 823

Home Stretch is the third novel written by the author, presenter, and comedian Graham Norton.

== Plot ==
In a small village in Ireland in 1987, a car crash occurs which kills three of the six passengers while paralysing another. The novel then follows one of the survivors, Connor, from 1987 to 2019 as well as his wider family through various locations including London, Liverpool, and New York.

== Promotion ==
The book was promoted on Sara Cox's BBC talk show Between the Covers.
