= Richard and Judy =

Duo of TV presenters

Richard and Judy is a term used to refer to married British television presenters Richard Madeley and Judy Finnigan. They co-hosted the ITV programme This Morning from 1988 to 2001 and later presented the chat show Richard & Judy from 2001 to 2009.

== Marriage and family ==
Madeley and Finnigan met in 1982 while working on separate television programmes for Granada Television. Both were married to other people at the time. After divorcing their previous spouses, they began a relationship and married in 1986 in Manchester. The couple had two children together: Jack Christopher (born 1986) and Chloe Susannah (born 1987), both born in Manchester.

== This Morning ==
They presented This Morning from its launch in 1988 until 2001. The programme featured a range of segments, including celebrity interviews, household tips, cookery, and phone-ins, and typically aired for around two hours each weekday morning on ITV. Initially broadcast from the Albert Dock in Liverpool, production moved to London in 1996.

Since leaving, Madeley has appeared on This Morning solo to promote his autobiography. On 5 October 2009, the couple joined the show's then-current hosts, Phillip Schofield and Holly Willoughby, to celebrate its 21st anniversary. They also returned for a special one-off episode to mark the programme's 25th anniversary.

== Richard & Judy ==
In 2001, they left This Morning after being approached by Channel 4 to host a programme titled Richard & Judy, which aired for one hour in the Dinner time slot.

The show was produced by Cactus TV, a company run by Simon Ross, the brother of Jonathan Ross, and his wife Amanda Ross. In February 2007, the couple issued a public apology on air following the discovery of a phone scam related to the daily quiz You Say We Pay, in which winners were selected in advance while viewers were still encouraged to call the premium-rate entry number. On the same broadcast, Madeley and Finnigan announced that the quiz would be suspended until further notice. Later that week, it was reported that police investigations would be conducted, potentially leading to interviews with the hosts. Channel 4 stated that the scam might have occurred over two series of the show. Both hosts denied involvement in the scam, which was exposed by The Mail on Sunday after receiving the story from media publicist Jonathan Hartley.

The show introduced two clubs: the Richard & Judy Book Club and the Richard & Judy Wine Club, which were similar in format to those associated with Oprah Winfrey. The Book Club focused on literature by new and emerging authors, with one book reviewed each week. An awards ceremony was held annually to announce the book selected as "Read of the Year".

In July 2008, Finnigan underwent knee surgery and took a brief leave of absence from the show to recover. During this period, Madeley was joined by guest presenters Emma Bunton and Myleene Klass, and presented one edition of the show alone on 23 July 2008.

In 2008, it was announced that their Channel 4 series which began in June would be the last for the programme, and ended on 22 August 2008. However, they signed a contract for a new prime-time show on UKTV's new channel, Watch. Their new show still contained features such as the "Book Club" and "Summer Read".

=== Move to Watch ===
Richard and Judy began hosting a new topical chat show on UKTV's digital channel, Watch, after seven years at Channel 4. The programme, Richard and Judy's New Position, premiered on 7 October 2008 and aired weeknights at 8:00 PM. The first episode was viewed by 200,000 people, but viewership declined over time, with the second episode attracting 53,000 viewers and numbers eventually falling to 11,000. This contrasted with their previous show on Channel 4, which had garnered up to 2.5 million viewers. Due to the decline in viewership, it was announced on 8 May 2009 that the show would be discontinued in July. The presenters commented that the low ratings were due to a lack of audience engagement.

== Other work together ==
Richard and Judy co-wrote an autobiography, Richard and Judy: The Autobiography, which was published in 2002 by Hodder & Stoughton.
