= Small Pleasures =

Novel

- First edition
- Author: Clare Chambers
- Language: English
- Genre: Historical; Romance
- Publisher: Weidenfeld & Nicolson
- Publication date: 2020
- Publication place: United Kingdom
- Pages: 343
- ISBN: 978-1474613880
- Dewey Decimal: 823.92

Small Pleasures is a historical romance novel written by author Clare Chambers. It was longlisted for the 2021 Women's Prize for Fiction, and featured on the BBC's talk show Between the Covers as a Book of the Week Pick.

== Plot ==
Set in 1957, the novel follows Jean Swinney, journalist for a local newspaper who investigates the claim of a woman who says her daughter was the result of a virgin birth.

== Awards and nominations ==
The book was longlisted for the 2021 Women's Prize for Fiction.

== Promotion ==
The book was promoted on Sara Cox's BBC talk show Between the Covers as a 'Book of the Week Pick'.
