= The Fine Art of Invisible Detection =

UK mystery crime thriller novel

- First edition
- Author: Robert Goddard
- Cover artist: David Wardle
- Language: English
- Genre: Mystery; Crime; Thriller
- Publisher: Hodder & Stoughton
- Publication date: 2020
- Publication place: United Kingdom
- Pages: 384
- ISBN: 978-1787632349
- Dewey Decimal: 823

'The Fine Art of Invisible Detection' is a 2021 mystery crime thriller novel by Robert Goddard.

== Promotion ==
The book was featured on the BBC talk show Between the Covers.
