= Boysie Singh =

Gangster, pirate and murderer from Trinidad and Tobago

Boysie Singh, (5 April 1908 – 20 August 1957) (also known as John Boysie Singh, the Raja (the Hindi word for king), or just Boysie) was a gangster, pirate and murderer from Trinidad and Tobago.

== Early life ==
John Boysie Singh was born on 5 April 1908 on 17 Luis Street in Woodbrook, Port of Spain in British Trinidad and Tobago to Bhagrang Singh (a fugitive who immigrated to British Trinidad from Punjab, British India) and his wife.

== Criminal career ==
He had a long and successful career as a gangster and gambler before turning to piracy and murder. For almost ten years, from 1947 until 1956 he and his gang terrorized the waters between Trinidad and Tobago and Venezuela. They were responsible for the deaths of approximately 400 people. They would promise to ferry people from Trinidad to Venezuela but en route he would rob his victims at gunpoint, kill them and dump them into the sea.

Boysie was well known in Trinidad and Tobago. He had successfully beaten a charge of breaking and entering which nearly resulted in his deportation before he was finally executed after losing his third case - for the murder of his niece. He was held in awe and dread by most of the population and was frequently seen strolling grandly about Port of Spain in the early 1950s wearing bright, stylish clothes. Mothers, nanis, and ajees would warn their children: "Behave yourself, man, or Boysie goyn get, allyuh!"

Boysie Singh died in Port of Spain by being hanged in 1957 for the murder of a dancer, Hattie Werk.

== Popular culture ==
Mustapha Matura wrote an unpublished play called The Life of Boysie Singh.

Novelist Ingrid Persaud published The Lost Love Songs of Boysie Singh in 2024, exploring Boysie's life through four women's experience of being involved with him.
