= The Crow Eaters =

1978 novel by Bapsi Sidhwa

- Cover of 1st edition, 1978
- Author: Bapsi Sidhwa
- Publisher: ILMI Printing Press
- Publication date: 1978
- Awards: Big Jubilee Read

The Crow Eaters is a 1978 comic novel by Bapsi Sidhwa. The novel is about a Parsi family. The book was Sidhwa's debut novel.

Sidhwa said in a 2012 interview that she was "still delighted" with the novel and regularly found passages of the book " ... that still make me laugh out loud. I remember laughing a lot as I was writing the book and being in a very good humour, for the most part". The BBC described the book in 2022 as "Wickedly funny and searingly honest [and] a vibrant portrait of a Parsi family taking its place in colonial India on the brink of the 20th century".

It was initially self-published in English in 1978. In 1980, it was published by Sangam Books of Mumbai, India and by Cape in London (ISBN 9780224018500). It has been republished several times including in 2015 by Daunt (ISBN 9781907970610). It was translated into Urdu in 2012 by Muhammad Umar Memon.

The novel attracted a hostile reception in Pakistan upon publication in 1982 due to its depiction of Parsis. In a 2012 interview Sidhwa recalled that The Crow Eaters received a warmer reception in Pakistan after the novel was well received by British reviewers. Sidhwa recalled that "A lot of Parsis were offended ... It was the first novel ever written about the Parsis, and the community was not accustomed to seeing themselves fictionalised or made fun of. They certainly accept and love the book now".

A bomb scare at the Intercontinental Hotel accompanied the publication of the book in Lahore.

The book was included in the Big Jubilee Read to celebrate the Platinum Jubilee of Elizabeth II in 2022.

== Plot ==
The book is about a Parsi family, the Junglewallas, in pre-partition India and their move from central India to the city of Lahore. The book opens with the death of the family patriarch, businessman Fareedon Junglewalla. Fareedon's conflicts with his mother-in-law provide many of the novel's comic scenes.
