= Robert Goddard (novelist) =

English novelist (born 1954)

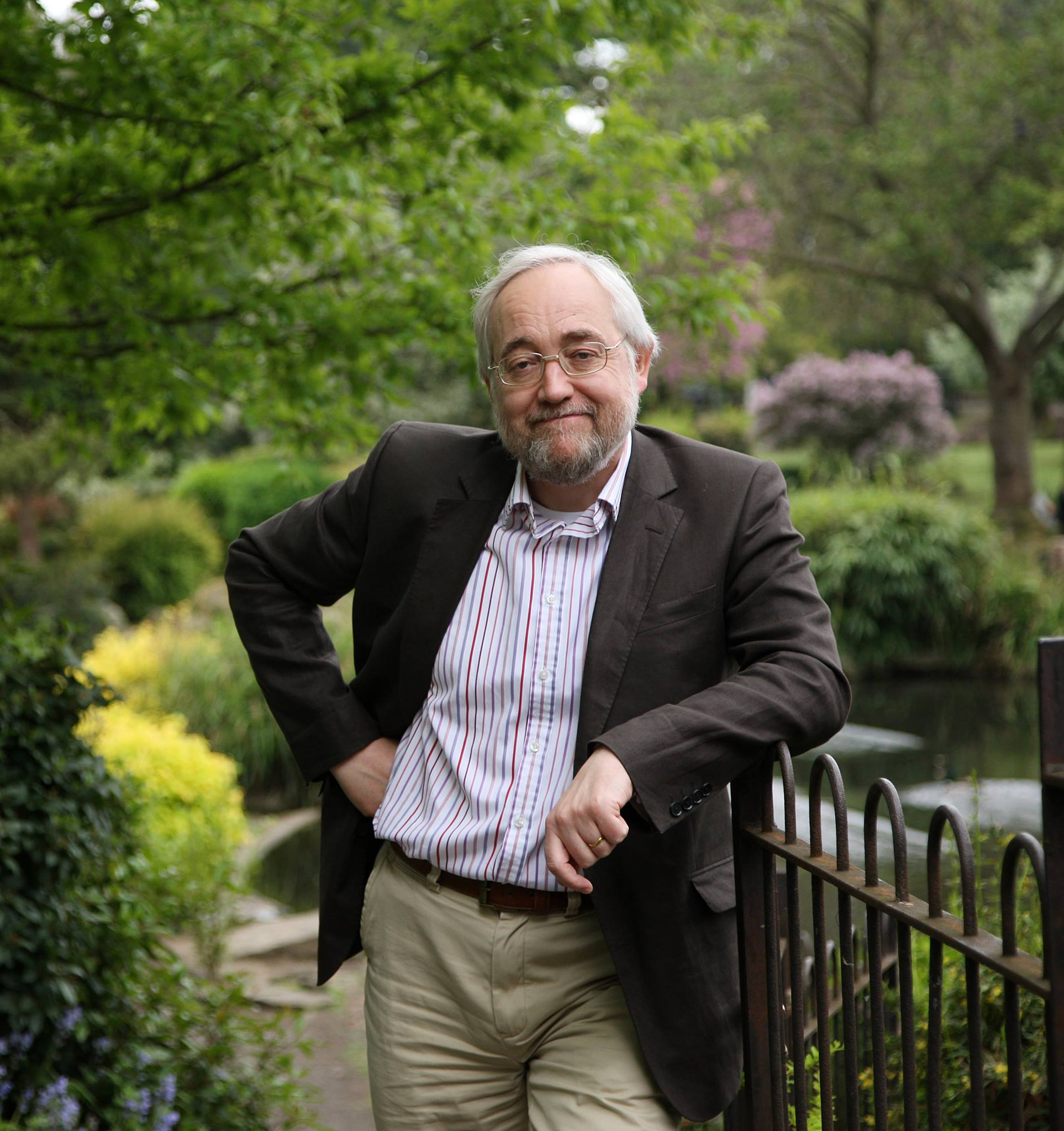
- Born: Robert William Goddard; 13 November 1954 (age 71); Fareham, Hampshire, England
- Occupation: Novelist
- Writing career
- Genres: Mystery fiction, Crime fiction

Robert William Goddard (born 13 November 1954) is an English novelist.

Goddard's first novel, Past Caring, was published in 1986. His book Long Time Coming won the 2011 Edgar Award for Best Original Paperback and was nominated for the 2011 Anthony award in the same category.

In 2019, Goddard was awarded the Cartier Diamond Dagger by the Crime Writers' Association for his outstanding lifetime contribution to the crime fiction genre.

== Harry Barnett ==
The books Into the Blue, Out of the Sun and Never Go Back, although distinct books in their own right, form a chronological series featuring the central character of Harry Barnett. Barnett also appears in both of Goddard's two published short stories, one of which, Toupee for a Bald Tyre, is set in 1970 before the events of the books.

== Bibliography ==
=== Novels ===
- Past Caring (August 1986), ISBN 0-7090-2743-5 (also published as The Historian)
- In Pale Battalions (May 1988), ISBN 0-593-01410-3
- Painting the Darkness (June 1989), ISBN 0-593-01413-8
- Into the Blue (May 1990), ISBN 0-593-01808-7. Harry Barnett, Book 1.(adapted as a TV film in 1996 starring John Thaw)
- Take No Farewell (June 1991), ISBN 0-593-01859-1 (Published in North America as Debt of Dishonour)
- Hand in Glove (November 1992), ISBN 0-593-02489-3
- Closed Circle (November 1993), ISBN 0-593-02492-3
- Borrowed Time (April 1995), ISBN 0-593-03587-9
- Out of the Sun (June 1996), ISBN 0-593-03614-X. Harry Barnett, Book 2
- Beyond Recall (June 1997), ISBN 0-593-03617-4
- Caught in the Light (June 1998), ISBN 0-593-04266-2
- Set in Stone (November 1999), ISBN 0-593-04271-9
- Sea Change (November 2000), ISBN 0-593-04274-3
- Dying to Tell (November 2001), ISBN 0-593-04758-3
- Days Without Number (May 2003), ISBN 0-593-04759-1
- Play to the End (May 2004), ISBN 0-593-04760-5
- Sight Unseen (May 2005), ISBN 0-593-05363-X
- Never Go Back (April 2006), ISBN 0-593-05365-6. Harry Barnett, Book 3
- Name to a Face (September 2007), ISBN 0-593-05367-2
- Found Wanting (September 2008), ISBN 0-593-06023-7
- Long Time Coming (UK: January 2010, US: March 2010), ISBN 0-593-06025-3
- Blood Count (UK: March 2011), ISBN 0-593-06508-5
- Fault Line (UK: March 2012), ISBN 0-593-06520-4
- The Ways of the World (2013), ISBN 9780593069738. James 'Max' Maxted trilogy, Book 1
- The Corners of the Globe (2014), ISBN 9780593069752. James 'Max' Maxted trilogy, Book 2
- The Ends of the Earth (2015), ISBN 9780593069790. James 'Max' Maxted trilogy, Book 3
- Panic Room (2018), ISBN 9780593076361
- One False Move (2019), ISBN 9780593076385
- The Fine Art of Invisible Detection (2021), Umiko Wada, Book 1 ISBN 9781787632349
- This Is the Night They Come For You (2022), ISBN 9781787635081 Mouloud Taleb and Souad Hidouchi, Book 1
- The Fine Art of Uncanny Prediction (2023), Umiko Wada, Book 2 ISBN 9781787635104
- This Is the Day They Dream of (2025), Mouloud Taleb and Souad Hidouchi, Book 2), ISBN 9781787635128

=== Short stories ===
- 'Toupee for a Bald Tyre'. (Harry Barnett). Included in The Detection Collection ISBN 978-0-00-756971-7 (Orion, 2005)
- 'Intersection: Paris, 1919', 2013. Prologue to ‘The Ways of the World’’. Made available for free.
- 'Birthday Buoy' (Harry Barnett). Included in First Edition: Celebrating 21 Years of Goldsboro Books (Dome Press, 2020)
