= Greg Buchanan =

British novelist and video game writer

- Born: 1989 (age 36–37)
- Education: University of Cambridge; University of East Anglia; King's College London
- Occupations: Novelist, Video game writer
- Website: https://www.gregbuchanan.co.uk

Greg Buchanan (born 1989) is a Scottish novelist and video game writer. He is the author of Sixteen Horses, a literary thriller published in 2021. His video game work includes the BAFTA longlisted American Election and Paper Brexit, and his writing credits include No Man's Sky and Metro Exodus.

== Early life and education ==
Buchanan was born in 1989 and lives in the Scottish Borders. He graduated with a BA in English from the University of Cambridge, an MA in creative writing from the University of East Anglia, and completed a Ph.D. at King's College London in identification and ethics. In 2014, he published a paper on experimental novelist B.S. Johnson.

== Career ==
Buchanan joined the video games industry in 2016 after participating in a game jam with the team at the video game studio Lionhead right before the company shut down. He broke into the industry by creating his own independent political game Paper Brexit. He later worked at Supermassive Games, the creators of Until Dawn. In 2017, Buchanan was hired to work on No Man's Sky with its Pathfinder update, and worked on the 30-hour story update Atlas Rises and beyond.

In 2020, Buchanan released American Election, an interactive fiction game starring Abigail Thoreau, a campaign assistant working to elect her candidate in a parallel world version of 2016. It was longlisted for the 2020 BAFTA Games award for ‘Game Beyond Entertainment’ as well as being an honorable mention for Excellence in Narrative at the Independent Games Festival 2020.

Buchanan's debut novel Sixteen Horses was released in 2021 in the UK and US. Publishers Weekly reviewed it as "a dark, ambitious, and highly intelligent thriller" and soon after Gaumont U.K. announced they had acquired the rights to develop a drama adaptation. The Guardian described it as "utterly gripping, exquisitely written and existentially depressing as only a drizzly afternoon in a dying English seaside town can be." Robert Purchese of Eurogamer writes "what Sixteen Horses also reminds me is how powerfully text can be wielded in the right hands." It was also picked as one of the literary titles to be covered in BBC Two's next series of Between the Covers.

== Honours and awards ==
- 2019, Europe "Sports & Games" category of the Forbes 30 Under 30, for video game writing
- 2020 BAFTA Games award long list (American Election)
- 2020 honorable mention for Excellence in Narrative at the Independent Games Festival (American Election)
