= Tristan Gooley =

British navigator and writer (born 1973)

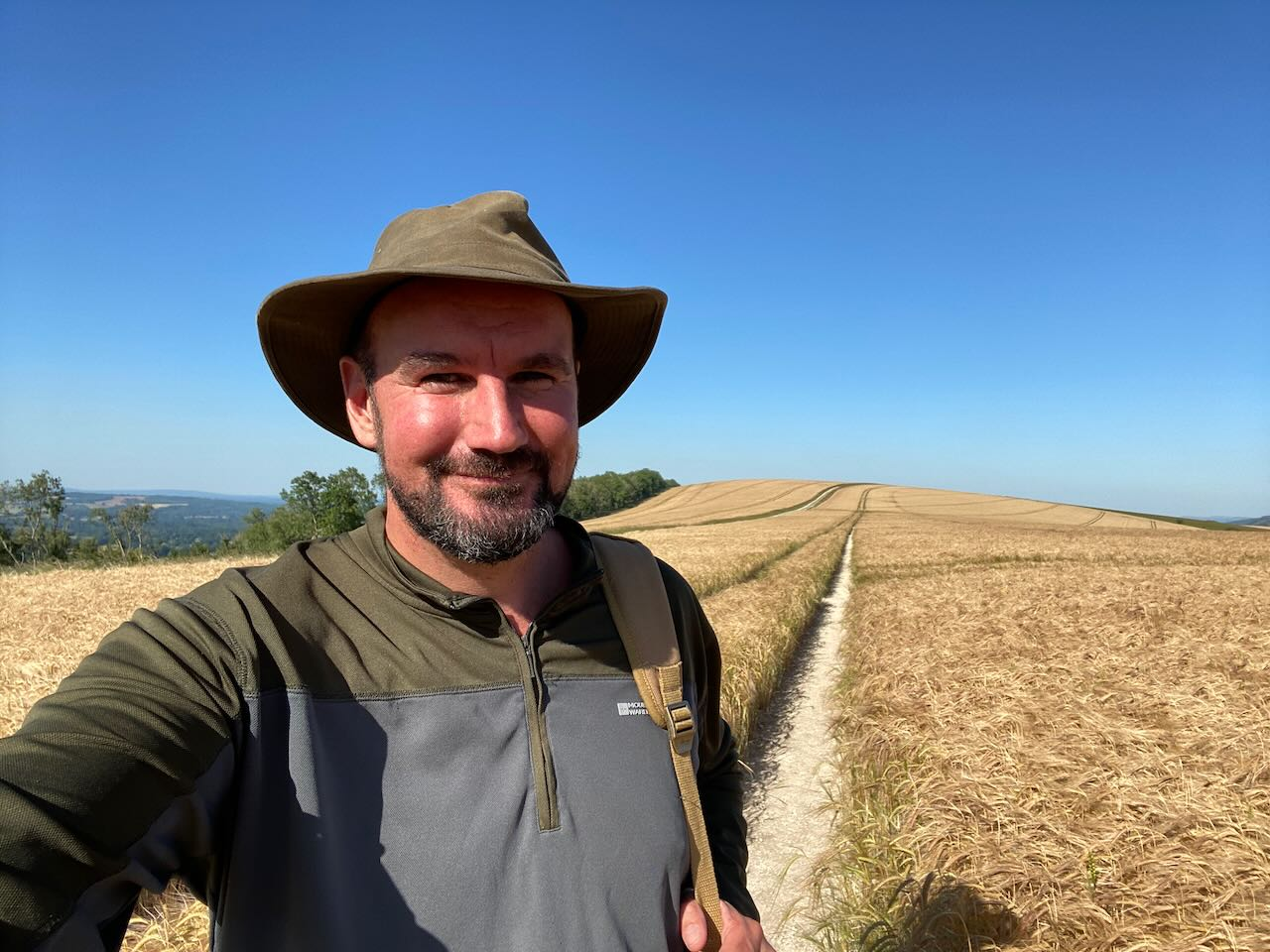
- Gooley at Bignor Hill, West Sussex in 2020

Tristan Gooley (born 1973) is a British writer on natural navigation.

== Early life and education ==
Gooley was born in 1973; his father is Sir Michael Gooley, the founder of Trailfinders, who was knighted in 2021 for services to business and charity.

Gooley has a BA in history and politics (1996) from Newcastle University. He climbed Mount Kilimanjaro while in his teens, and, aged 19, he spent three days lost on the slopes of Gunung Rinjani, an active volcano in Indonesia.

== Travel and navigation ==
Gooley has walked with the Dayak in Borneo, and in 2009 studied and practiced natural navigation methods with the Tuareg in the Libyan Sahara. In 2012 he led a short-handed small boat voyage, from the Orkney Islands into the Arctic Circle, to test Viking methods and determine whether nature can help a navigator estimate their distance from land. He has walked from Glasgow to London and parachuted off a building in Australia. After years of extreme journeys, aged 36 he turned towards smaller journeys and studying nature.

In 2008, he became the second person, after Steve Fossett (1944-2007), to have both sailed solo and flown solo across the Atlantic; as of 2023, he is the only living person to have done so.

Gooley specialises in interpreting nature's signs, and has been referred to as the "Sherlock Holmes of Nature".

He has identified a type of path, which has been recognised by the Royal Institute of Navigation. The "smile path" is a (smile-shaped) curve, formed when walkers avoid an obstacle or, during Covid, seek to preserve safe distance from other people.

== Writing ==
Gooley has written for the New York Times, the Sunday Times, the Wall Street Journal and the BBC. He is the author of books which have been translated into 19 languages, and have been referenced by artists including David Hockney.

== Recognition ==
Gooley is a fellow of the Royal Institute of Navigation and of the Royal Geographical Society.

In 2020 was awarded the Harold Spencer-Jones Gold Medal by the Royal Institute of Navigation in recognition of an outstanding contribution to navigation.

== Personal life ==
Gooley is married to Sophie and they have two sons. They live in Eartham, West Sussex.

Gooley is vice-chairman of Trailfinders, the travel agency founded in 1970 by his father.

== Selected publications ==
=== Books ===
- Gooley, Tristan (2011). The natural navigator. London: Virgin. ISBN 978-1-905264-94-0.
- Gooley, Tristan (2013). The natural explorer. London: Sceptre. ISBN 978-1-4447-2031-0.
- Gooley, Tristan (2014). The walker's guide to outdoor clues and signs : their meaning and the art of making predictions and deductions. London. ISBN 978-1-4447-8008-6.
- Gooley, Tristan (2014). How to connect with nature. London. ISBN 978-0-230-76807-9.
- Gooley, Tristan (2017). How to read water : clues and patterns from puddles to the sea. London. ISBN 978-1-4736-1522-9.
- Gooley, Tristan (14 April 2022). The Secret World of Weather: how to read signs in every cloud, breeze, hill, street, plant, animal, and dewdrop. Sceptre. ISBN 978-1-5293-3958-1.
- Gooley, Tristan (2023). How to Read a Tree : clues & patterns from roots to leaves. [S.l.]: Sceptre. ISBN 978-1-5293-3959-8.

=== Articles ===
- Gooley, Tristan (March 2010). "The Natural Way of Not Getting Lost". BBC Radio 4, Today. Retrieved 5 May 2023.
- Gooley, Tristan and MacDonald, Ross (July 2010). "Navigating the Urban Jungle". New York Times. Retrieved 5 May 2023.
- Gooley, Tristan (March 2013). "Nature's Radar". Journal of Navigation. 66 (2): 161–179. doi:10.1017/S0373463312000495. S2CID 128428067.
- Gooley, Tristan (April 2008). "Double Atlantic" (PDF). Yachting Monthly. pp. 60–64. Archived from the original (PDF) on 26 May 2013.
- Gooley, Tristan (May 2019). "Walking", The Wall Street Journal. Retrieved 5 May 2023.
- Gooley, Tristan (April 2023). "How to use a tree as a compass (and other tricks)" The Times. Retrieved 5 May 2023.
- Gooley, Tristan (April 2023). "A captain’s-eye view of weird, wondrous weather at sea". The Telegraph. Retrieved 5 May 2023.
