= Bolu Babalola =

British writer (born 1991)

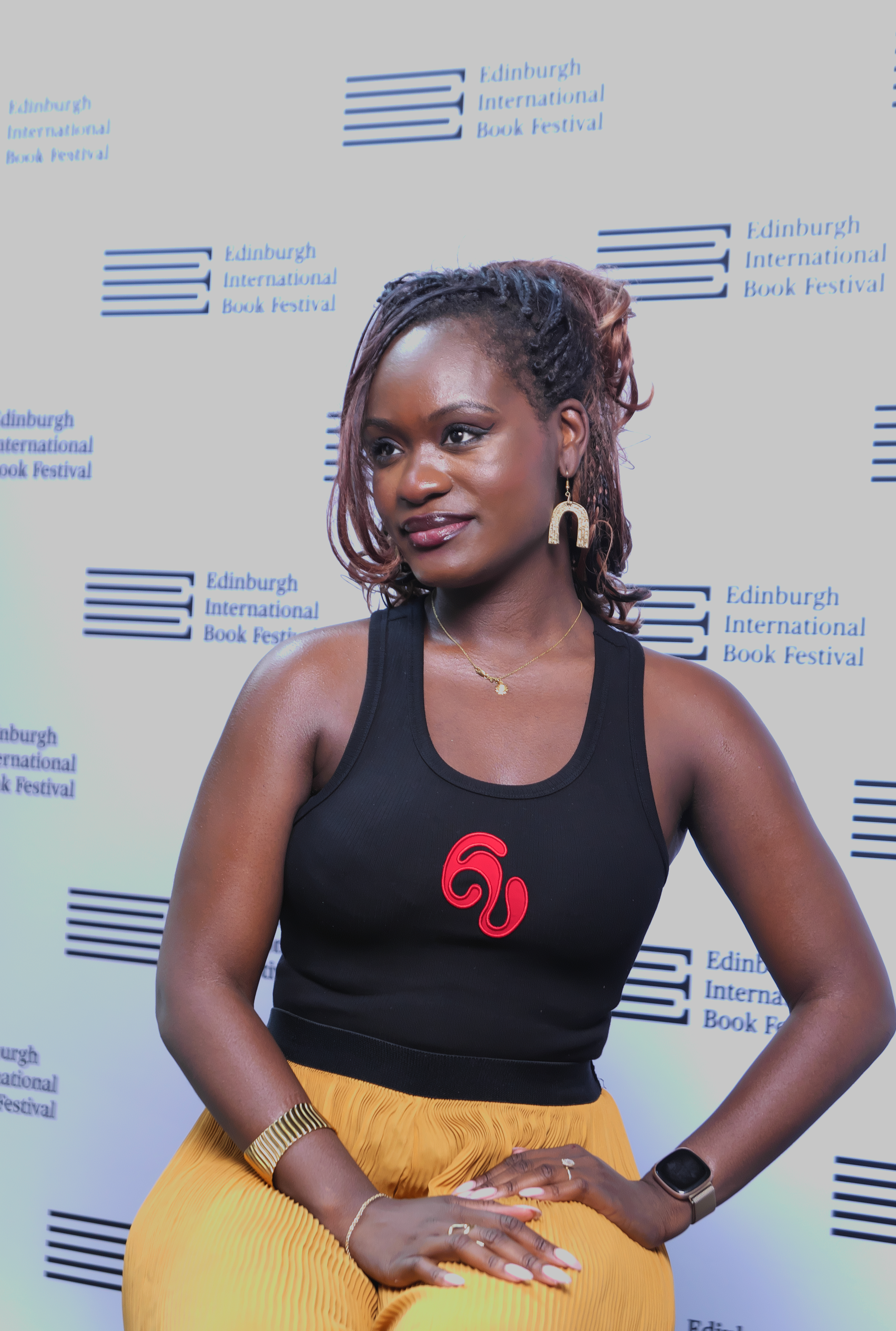
- Babalola in 2025
- Born: 24 February 1991 (age 35); Southwark, London, England
- Education: University of Reading; University College London
- Occupations: Author, journalist, screenwriter
- Website: www.bolubabalola.com

Bolu Babalola (born 24 February 1991) is a British author, screenwriter, and journalist. Her debut anthology Love in Colour was published in 2020 and became a Sunday Times Bestseller. She appeared on the 2021 Forbes 30 under 30 list for Media and Marketing in Europe.

== Early life ==
Babalola was born in Guy's Hospital in Southwark to Nigerian Yoruba parents and grew up in East London. She attended Valentines High School in Ilford for sixth form. She went on to graduate with a Bachelor of Laws from the University of Reading in 2012 and later a Master of Arts in American Politics and History from University College London in 2018.

== Career ==
Babalola began her career working as an assistant writer and producer for BBC Comedy, contributing to The Javone Prince Show and Tracey Ullman's Show. She pitched the Cecile Emeke web series Ackee & Saltfish, assistant producing the pilot episode. As of August 2020, she was working on a television programme with Tiger Aspect. She was shortlisted in 2016 for The Guardian and 4th Estate B4ME prize for her debut story, "Netflix and Chill".

She has written for publications such as Vice, Vulture, GQ, Cosmopolitan, and Stylist.

A television and film columnist for Dazed, Babalola is a self-professed "Romcomoisseur". She named Insecure by Issa Rae and Larry Wilmore, Brown Sugar, When Harry Met Sally, My Best Friend's Wedding, Nick and Norah's Infinite Playlist, Lovesick, and New Girl as her favourite romcoms. She praised Michaela Coel's I May Destroy You. She called the characters Ashley Banks from The Fresh Prince of Bel-Air and the titular character of the series Moesha, played by Brandy Norwood, important examples of "just dark skin black girls living".

On September 10, 2021, the television show she wrote, executive produced and created, Big Age, premiered on Channel 4.

In 2018, Babalola sent a tweet with a photoshopped image of her and Michael B. Jordan, asking Twitter to help find her "holiday romance" as a joke. The tweet went viral, and was featured on Entertainment Tonight and The Steve Harvey Show. Jordan and Babalola later met when he was promoting a film in London. Babalola explained: "At the Q&A at the end, I stood up and said: "Hi, it's me, the love of your life." It was mortifying, but he was so lovely."

A Twitter humourist, she has said that Twitter is an important space for building community, especially among Black women.

=== Love in Colour ===
Babalola's debut anthology, Love in Colour, was published in 2020 by Headline Publishing Group. The collection of short stories "remixes ancient love stories from Asia, Greece, and around Africa for a new audience", including pre-colonial Yoruba stories, Orisha traditions, and Ancient Soninke tales. She stated that she hopes the book is a "step towards decolonizing tropes of love". Babalola changed many of the stories to make the female characters more empowered, and to demonstrate consent and love without suffering. She has said that its important to her to write about and for Black women, stating: "you're used to seeing white women play [romantic archetypes]. They're fun girls, independent, they have their own minds and they have access to their own iteration of romance. Why don't we have that?"

Love in Colour was featured on 13 November 2020 as "book of the week" of BBC2's book club programme Between the Covers, hosted by Sara Cox. Fellow writers Candice Carty-Williams, David Nicholls, and Meg Cabot have praised Love in Colour, with Babalola saying "That's when it felt real... Meg Cabot who I adored growing up, who I still adore, loves the book… That's the moment when it sunk in." The anthology has been translated into Dutch, German and Portuguese (Brazil).

=== Honey & Spice ===
In August 2020, Babalola began teasing her next novel, "a collegiate rom-com set in an Afro-Caribbean Society in a UK university, where enemies become friends and eventually lovers". In January 2021, it was announced she had signed a deal with Headline Review for Honey & Spice, as well as another untitled project. William Morrow and Company acquired the North America rights. Honey & Spice was published in summer 2022.

The sequel to Honey & Spice, Sweet Heat, was published in fall 2025. A film adaptation is in development at Working Title Films.

== Bibliography ==
=== Novels ===
- Honey & Spice (2022)
- Sweet Heat (2025)

=== Short story collections ===
- Love in Colour: Mythical Tales from Around the World, Retold (2020); released as Love in Color to US market in 2021.

=== Short stories ===
- "Netflix and Chill" (2016)
