= Weyward =

2023 novel by Emilia Hart

- First edition cover
- Author: Emilia Hart
- Language: English
- Genre: Historical fiction
- Published: March 7, 2023
- Publisher: St. Martin's Press
- Publication place: United States
- Media type: Print (hardcover)
- Pages: 336
- ISBN: 978-1250280800

Weyward is a 2023 novel by British-Australian writer Emilia Hart. The novel is historical fiction with elements of the supernatural. A story of female power and resilience, it has been called an example of feminist "witcherature."

== Plot ==
The novel intertwines three stories of different women throughout history: Altha in the 1600s, Violet in the 1940s, and Kate in the present day. As each of them faces obstacles because of their gender, each also has access to a mysterious power that comes from nature.

== Reception ==
Weyward debuted at number 8 on The New York Times bestseller list.

A review in BookPage magazine stated, "Most of the novel's men are portrayed as unremittingly villainous, and some readers will wish for a little more complexity there. Still, Weyward is a satisfying, well-plotted historical page turner and a welcome addition to the feminist field of 'witcherature.'" Kirkus Reviews noted that the book "captures the ways patriarchy has sought to limit women for all of history and the ways women have found to carve out freedom for themselves," and called it a "successful blend of historical fiction and modern feminism." Publishers Weekly called Weyward "captivating" and "triumphant," stating that "Hart skillfully weaves together the stories of the determined women, showing how they confronted a patriarchal society to take control of their lives."
