= Jane Green (author) =

English-born American author (born 1968)

- Born: 31 May 1968 (age 58); London, England
- Other name: Jane Green Warburg
- Occupation: Author
- Years active: 1998–present
- Spouse(s): first, David Burke; second, Ian Warburg
- Children: 6, of whom 2 are stepchildren

Jane Green (born in 1968) is an English novelist based in the United States. As of 2014, Green's books had sold in excess of 10 million copies globally, with translations of them appearing in thirty-one languages. She has been described as "One of the first of the chick lit crew".

== Biography ==
Jane Green was born in London, England, on 31 May 1968. She attended South Hampstead High School, and went on to study fine art at Aberystwyth University.

== Career ==
Green was employed by Granada TV as a publicist in her early 20s. She continued working as a journalist throughout her twenties, writing women's features for publications including The Daily Express.

Green left The Daily Express in 1996, to begin work which in the publication of her first book, Straight Talking, seven months later, for which there was a bidding war. The book launched her career as "the queen of chick lit". As of 2014, Green had over 10 million books in print. "Jane Green" is the name she continued to use in her writing career, including after she married her second spouse, Ian Warburg of the Warburg banking family.

Green has taught at writers' conferences, and writes for various publications including Cosmopolitan magazine and The Huffington Post. Her contribution of an e-book on the marriages of English royals for ABC News, Green became an ABC News Radio correspondent, and covered the 2011 wedding of Catherine Middleton to Britain's Prince William.

Green contributed a story on the virtue of marital fidelity for The Moth Radio Hour, which was recorded in November 2015, and aired in September 2016.

== Personal life ==
Green is now divorced after living in Westport, Connecticut, with her second husband, investment adviser Ian Warburg (grandson of Mary and Edward Warburg), whom she married 6 March 2009. Green has four children from her first marriage to American investment banker David Burke and two stepchildren.

== Books ==
- Jemima J: A Novel About Ugly Ducklings and Swans (1998)
- Mr. Maybe (2001)
- Bookends (2002)
- Babyville: A Novel (2003)
- Straight Talking: A Novel
- Spellbound [UK] / To Have and to Hold [US]
- The Other Woman: A Novel (2005)
- This Christmas (2005)
- Life Swap [UK] / Swapping Lives [US] (2006)
- Second Chance (2007)
- The Beach House (2008)
- Girl Friday [UK] / Dune Road [US] (2009)
- The Love Verb [UK] / Promises to Keep [US] (2010)
- The Patchwork Marriage [UK] / Another Piece of my Heart [US] (2012)
- The Accidental Husband [UK] / Family Pictures [US] (2013)
- Tempting Fate (2014)
- Saving Grace (2015)
- Cat and Jemima J (novella) (2015)
- Summer Secrets (2015)
- Falling: A Love Story (2016)
- Good Taste [a food & entertaining/nonfiction book] (2016)
- The Sunshine Sisters (2017)
- The Friends We Keep (2019)
- Sister Stardust (2022)
- Rewilding (2026)
