= Jemima J =

2000 novel by Jane Green

- First edition
- Author: Jane Green
- Language: English
- Publisher: Broadway Books
- Publication date: 2000
- Publication place: United Kingdom
- Media type: Hardcover

Jemima J: A Novel About Ugly Ducklings and Swans is a 2000 novel by British author Jane Green.

== Synopsis ==
Jemima Jones is a clever, good-hearted, but self-deprecating columnist for a small newspaper in Kilburn, London. At 217 pounds (98 kg), she envies her slim, glamorous coworker Geraldine and resents her two likewise slim flatmates, who frequently take advantage of her good nature while mocking her for her size. Jemima has a crush on Ben, the office hunk, but feels too embarrassed by her appearance to approach him. When her office finally gets internet access, Jemima begins visiting chatrooms and develops a long-distance relationship with a handsome gym owner named Brad from Santa Monica, California. At the same time, Ben leaves the newspaper for a television position, leaving Jemima alone with a broken heart.

To get over Ben, Jemima throws herself into her online relationship with Brad and re-invents herself as "JJ", an attractive newsreader. Geraldine furthers the false identity by putting Jemima's face on a photo of a fit magazine model. After seeing the doctored photo, Brad falls head over heels for "JJ" and invites Jemima to visit him. Jemima impulsively accepts the invitation and finds herself forced to lose almost 100 pounds (45 kg) in just over six months in order to match the image of "JJ." As Jemima slims down, Geraldine takes the role of her fairy godmother, buying Jemima a whole new wardrobe, coloring her hair, and teaching her how to use make-up.

Having lost the weight, Jemima flies to California and meets Brad, who takes her to his impressive home. Soon, however, she begins to realize that she and Brad are incompatible in almost every way except physically. Brad's job often leaves Jemima alone in a strange city all day. Jemima attempts to befriend Brad's overweight, overprotective personal assistant Jenny, only to be coldly rebuffed. Lonely and disenchanted, Jemima distracts herself by exercising and soon becomes dangerously underweight. She comes to the conclusion that her newfound obsession with thinness is as unhealthy as her former obesity, and that her obesity was a cover for lifelong insecurities that are still present even though she is now thin. Finally she befriends Lauren, a fellow Englishwoman and journalist now living in Santa Monica, who upon hearing Jemima's story, warns her that Brad's behavior is suspicious.

The final straw comes when Jemima accidentally discovers a huge stash of fat fetish pornography, including sexually explicit photos of Jenny, while cleaning Brad's bedroom. She confronts Brad, who confesses that he has always been attracted to large women and that he and Jenny have been in love since high school, but that he needs a slim, conventionally attractive girlfriend in order to keep up appearances in beauty-conscious Santa Monica. Jemima, crushed and furious at the betrayal, leaves him, only to find herself stranded in California for six more weeks as she cannot afford to change her flight after spending nearly all her savings on travelling. Lauren takes her in and offers her a temporary job with a magazine publisher.

By happenstance, Jemima learns that Ben has become a celebrity back home and is at that moment in Santa Monica on business. Jemima rushes to meet him. Ben, who has not seen Jemima since her transformation, barely recognizes her, but the two quickly realize that their feelings go far deeper than appearances. They spend a passionate night together. Ben must return to England the following morning, but promises to call as soon as he gets home. Jemima is devastated when his call never comes.

After several more weeks in California, Jemima finally summons the courage to phone Geraldine, who scolds her for not reaching out sooner. Ben lost Jemima's number and, frantic to contact Jemima, reached out to Geraldine, but Geraldine, who did not have Jemima's new phone number with Lauren, was unable to help him. Meanwhile, in a magazine interview, Ben has confessed to the whole country that he is in love with Jemima.

Geraldine once again plays fairy godmother by sending Jemima a copy of Ben's magazine interview and a return ticket home. Jemima reunites with Ben and the two start a relationship. Jemima is happy, lets go of her body issues, and learns to love herself for who she is.

== Reception ==
Critical reviews of Jemima J were mixed, with People recommending it as a "Pick" in their "Picks and Pans" column, describing it as a "sweet and tasty" read in the style of Bridget Jones's Diary. However both Kirkus Reviews and Publishers Weekly criticized the writing and humor as weak but praised its unusual premise and "engaging plot twists." The book also received criticism for its negative portrayal of body issues and its unrealistic, dangerous depictions of starvation dieting and its results.

== Sequel ==
The character of Jemima reappears in a short story, "Cat and Jemima J," which was released in 2015. In it, Jemima befriends Cat, a younger woman struggling with alcoholism and a string of bad relationships, even though Jemima's own fairy tale ending has collapsed unexpectedly. The short story serves as a teaser for Green's Summer Secrets, in which Cat is the protagonist. Jemima herself does not appear in Summer Secrets.

In 2017, Green stated in interview that she was considering a full sequel to Jemima J but that "there are other stories I need to tell before I revisit."
