= Ingrid Persaud =

Trinidad and Tobago-born writer, artist, academic

Ingrid Persaud FRSL
- Born: Trinidad and Tobago
- Education: London School of Economics; Goldsmith College; Central St. Martins
- Occupations: Writer, artist and academic
- Notable work: Love After Love (2020)
- Awards: Commonwealth Short Story Prize; BBC National Short Story Award; Costa First Novel Award

Ingrid Persaud is a Trinidad and Tobago-born writer, artist, and academic, who lives in the United Kingdom. A Fellow at the Royal Society of Literature, she won the BBC National Short Story Award in 2018 and the Commonwealth Short Story Prize in 2017 with her debut short story "The Sweet Sop". The narrative revolves around an estranged father and son reuniting through their shared love for chocolate.

Ingrid's first book, Love After Love was published in 2020; it won the Costa Book Award for First Novel.

In 2024, Persaud released her latest novel, The Lost Love Songs of Boysie Singh.

== Education and work ==
Persaud read law at the London School of Economics and studied fine art at Goldsmiths, University of London and Central Saint Martins. Persaud taught law at King's College London, and the Fletcher School of Law and Diplomacy, and worked as a visual artist and project manager before becoming a writer.

== Writing career ==
Persaud began writing in her 40s, after working as a legal academic and visual artist.

She has also written for National Geographic, Granta, Prospect and Pree, as well as The Guardian and the I newspaper.

=== Love After Love ===
Persaud's debut novel was published on 31 March 2020 by Faber & Faber in the UK and 4 August 2020 through One World/Random House in the USA.

The story, set in modern-day Trinidad, centres the Ramdin-Chetan family, told from three separate perspectives: Betty Ramdin, her son Solo, and their lodger Mr Chetan. These characters form an unconventional household full of love and affection until the night when a glass of rum, a heart to heart and a terrible truth explodes the family unit, driving them apart. The novel asks us to consider what happens at the very brink of human forgiveness, and offers hope to anyone who has loved and lost and has yet to find their way back.

The book examines love in many iterations and also highlights the treatment of gay people in the Caribbean, the fragility of life as an undocumented migrant in the United States, as well as traditional religious beliefs contrasted with unconventional spirituality.

She received critical acclaim including from The Guardian's reviewer, who said, "Persaud gives us a captivating interrogation of love in all its forms, how it heals and how it harms, the twists and torments of obsession (mania), sex and romance (eros), family (storge), friendship (philia), acceptance or rejection by the community, and so on." The New York Times stated: "Great books about love, like this one, feel like precious and impossible gifts. We should cherish the writers who provide them."

The title of Persaud's novel refers to a poem of the same name by Caribbean author and poet Derek Walcott.

== Awards and recognition ==
Persaud was elected a Fellow of the Royal Society of Literature (FRSL) in 2025.

Year	Title	Award	Category	Result	Ref.
2020	Love After Love	Costa Book Awards	First Novel	Won	
2021	Love After Love	Authors' Club Best First Novel Award	—	Won	
2021	Love After Love	Diverse Book Awards	Adult	2nd Place	
2021	Love After Love	Indie Book Awards (UK)	Fiction	Won	
2021	Love After Love	Independent Booksellers' Book Prize	Fiction	Shortlisted	

== Personal life ==
Persaud left Trinidad at 18 and moved to the UK to study. She has lived at various times in Boston and Barbados. She has identical twin sons.

== Bibliography ==
=== Novels ===
- Love After Love (2020)
- The Lost Love Songs of Boysie Singh (2024)

=== Short stories ===
- "The Sweet Sop" (2017)
