= Clare Chambers (novelist) =

British novelist of different genres

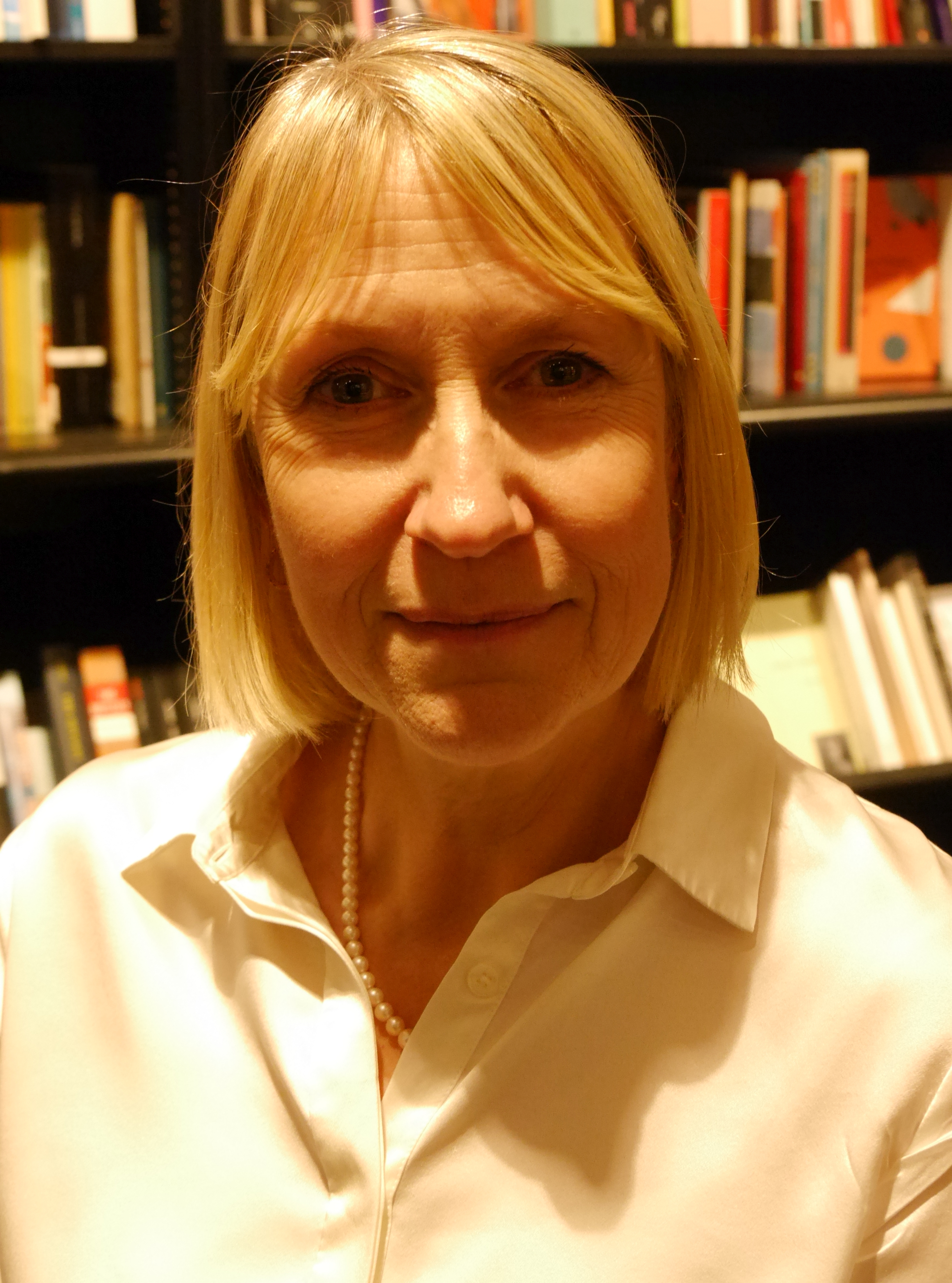
- Chambers at Hatchards London in 2024
- Born: 1966 (age 59–60); Croydon, Greater London, England, UK
- Occupation: Novelist
- Spouse: Peter
- Writing career
- Language: English
- Period: 1992–present
- Genres: Romance, children's fiction
- Notable awards: RoNA Award

Clare Chambers (born 1966) is a British novelist of different genres. In 1999, her novel Learning to Swim won the Romantic Novel of the Year Award by the Romantic Novelists' Association.

== Biography ==
Clare Chambers was born in Croydon, Greater London, the daughter of English teachers. In 1984, she went up to Oxford to read English at Hertford College. After graduating, she and her future husband, Peter, also a teacher, moved to New Zealand, where she wrote her first novel. The couple lived in Norwood, Surrey, close to Selhurst Park, and in 1993 moved to Bromley, Kent, where they brought up their children.

== Bibliography ==
=== Single novels ===
- Uncertain Terms (1992)
- Back Trouble (1994)
- Learning to Swim (1998)
- A Dry Spell (2000)
- In a Good Light (2004)
- The Editor's Wife (2007)
- Bright Girls (2009)
- Burning Secrets (2011)
- Small Pleasures (2020)
- Shy Creatures (2024)
