= Wendy Mitchell (activist) =

English dementia awareness activist (1956–2024)

Wendy Patricia Mitchell (31 January 1956 – 22 February 2024) was an English writer and a dementia activist.

== Biography ==
Mitchell was born in Wakefield, West Yorkshire as Wendy Patricia Draper. She grew up in her family's pub and was a sportswoman during her school years in Pontefract. She later became a fell-walker in the Lake District.

Mitchell raised her two daughters as a single mother while working as a cleaner and later in administrative roles within the NHS. After being diagnosed with dementia, she retired from her position as a rota manager at Leeds General Infirmary. She then campaigned for workplaces to support employees newly diagnosed with dementia.

In retirement, Mitchell pursued writing and photography, capturing local wildlife in her village of Walkington. She contributed to various organizations, including Innovations in Dementia and York Minds and Voices, and advised on the BBC TV series Casualty and the film Still Alice (2014). Throughout her life, Mitchell authored three books.

Mitchell raised funds for Dementia UK through annual challenges, which included skydiving, firewalking, and wing walking. She chose to end her life through the voluntarily stopping eating and drinking (VSED), a topic she discussed in her book One Last Thing. In her final blog post, she expressed her belief that she had taken control of her own life and urged others to campaign for assisted dying laws.

She died on 22 February 2024, at the age of 68.

== Bibliography ==
Her published works are:

- Mitchell, Wendy (2018). Somebody I used to know. Ballantine Books. ISBN 9781524797911.
- Mitchell, Wendy (2022). What I wish people knew about dementia: from someone who knows. Bloomsbury. ISBN 9781526634481.
- Mitchell, Wendy (2023). One last thing: how to live with the end in mind. Bloomsbury Publishing Plc. ISBN 9781526658753.
