= Agent Running in the Field =

2019 novel by John le Carré

- First edition cover
- Author: John le Carré
- Audio read by: John le Carré
- Language: English
- Publisher: Viking Books
- Publication date: 17 October 2019
- Publication place: United Kingdom
- Media type: Print (Hardcover and paperback)
- Pages: 288
- ISBN: 978-0-241-40123-1
- Dewey Decimal: 823/.914
- LC Class: PR6062.E33 L43 2019

Agent Running in the Field is a 2019 novel by British writer John le Carré, published on 17 October 2019. It was le Carré's final novel to be published before his death in 2020.

== Plot summary ==
The novel is set in 2018 and depicts the relationship between Nat (né Anatoly), a 47-year-old member of the British Secret Intelligence Service (MI6), and Ed, a young man with whom he plays badminton weekly. After their matches, Ed rants about Brexit and Donald Trump, to which Nat quietly listens and tacitly agrees. Meanwhile, Nat is running an operation to monitor a Ukrainian oligarch living in London. Through this mission, one of Nat's agents reveals that Ed is giving British secrets to Russian intelligence. Nat's MI6 colleagues suspect Nat of abetting him and grill him. Through their questioning and Nat's continued investigation, Operation Jericho is revealed: a plan for the UK to use covert means to undermine the EU at the US's behest.

== Themes ==
In an extract from the novel published prior to publication, The Guardian describes how "Nat admits to serious reservations about the idea of England "as the mother of all democracies", describing the country as in freefall, with "a minority Tory cabinet of 10th-raters ... Labour no better. The sheer bloody lunacy of Brexit". Boris Johnson is described in the book as a "pig-ignorant foreign secretary". John le Carré's editor at Viking Books, Mary Mount, has said that "The thing about Le Carré is that he's always been as much at home in Europe as Britain. A man with his experience of the Cold War could not walk away from the divisions in Britain, and between Britain and Europe. ... After the referendum, there was no choice for him except to look at where we are now ... It is incredibly prescient, and a very emotional book in terms of how connected he feels to the history of Britain and Europe. There's no looking away, he addresses the very current political crisis".

== Critical reception ==
According to Bethanne Patrick, writing for NPR, "The pre-publication press release tells us this is le Carré's 'Brexit novel', but that diminishes a novel that may be a portrait in miniature of modern spies, but is in miniature as detailed and astonishing and entertaining as anything in its genre today." Robert McCrum wrote of the book; "Le Carré delivers a tale for our times, replete with the classic seasoning of betrayal, secret state shenanigans and sad-eyed human frailty, all baked into an oven-hot contemporary thriller that’s partly inspired by the machinations of 21st-century Ukraine, today more than ever the fatal crossroads of great power politics." An anonymous book review at Kirkus Reviews summarized: "A tragicomic salute to both the recuperative powers of its has-been hero and the remarkable career of its nonpareil author." Michael J. McCann found the book "a pleasure to read," but noted that the secondary characters were underdone and the ending "feels hurried and rather truncated."
