= Trailfinders =

British travel company

- Industry: Travel; Holidays
- Founded: 1970
- Founder: Mike Gooley
- Headquarters: United Kingdom
- Website: https://www.trailfinders.com/

Trailfinders is a British travel company in the United Kingdom and Ireland.

It is the largest independently-owned travel company in the United Kingdom, and has 47 travel centres in the UK and Ireland. The company "specialises in tailormade travel worldwide" including Europe, Australia, New Zealand, North and South America, Asia and Africa. Uniquely, Trailfinders safeguard client money in an ATOL approved Trust Account until they return home from holiday.

== History ==
Trailfinders was founded by former SAS-officer Sir Mike Gooley in October 1970 in an office on Earls Court Road in west London.

In 1972 Trailfinders became the UK's first flight consolidator and advertised discounted air tickets in the national press. In 1979 the company became the first travel organiser to be IATA-licensed and to be granted an ATOL licence by the Civil Aviation Authority. In 1990 the company pioneered the concept of tailormade travel.

Trailfinders is the largest independently owned travel company in the United Kingdom and employs over 1100 staff. It has made travel arrangements for over 16 million clients and has 44 travel centres in the UK and 3 in Ireland.

== Awards ==
Trailfinders has won more than 100 national awards.

Recent awards include:

Which? Awards - Travel Brand of the Year 2026

Which? Awards - Travel Brand of the Year 2025

Trustpilot - #1 Travel Agent

Wanderlust Travel Award - Favourite Tour Operator 2024

The Times, The Sunday Times & The Sunday Times Travel Magazine Travel Awards 2025 - Best Tour Operator For the 12th consecutive year and since the inception of these awards

Food & Travel Magazine Awards 2018, 2017 - Tour Operator of the year

National Geographic Traveller 2017 - Travel Experts

The Guardian - Most Trusted 2016 and Best Package Holiday Operator 2016

The Telegraph Travel Awards - Best Tour Operator 2014, 2012, 2011, 2008, 2007, 2005, 2004, 2003, 2002, 2001

Which? Awards - Best Travel Company 2015

Which? Consumer Travel Survey - Best Holiday Company 2014, 2013

CLIA UK & Ireland Cruise Excellence Awards - High Street Travel Agent of the Year 2015, 2014

== Ownership ==
Trailfinders was founded by Mike Gooley who is also the owner and executive chairman.

Gooley was named Entrepreneur of the Year in the Consumer Services category at the inaugural EY National Entrepreneur of the Year awards in December 1999. In 2006 he was appointed a CBE for his services to the Travel Industry and to charity. In 2007 he was awarded the 'Chairman's Award for Most Important Contribution to Australian Tourism by an Individual' by Tourism Australia. In 2018 the Sunday Times Rich List named him as the UK's 21st most generous giver to charity. He was granted the rank of Knight Bachelor for services to Business and Charity in the Queen's 2021 Birthday Honours List.
