= Starter for Ten =

Starter for Ten may refer to:

- A catchphrase from the Granada TV series University Challenge
- Starter for Ten (novel), a 2003 novel by David Nicholls
  - Starter for 10 (film), the 2006 film adaptation of the above book
  - Starter for Ten (musical), a 2024 stage musical adaptation of the novel and film
