= One Day (musical) =

2026 musical by Amanda Sudano, Abner Ramirez, and David Grieg

- The Musical
- Music: Amanda Sudano; Abner Ramirez
- Lyrics: Amanda Sudano; Abner Ramirez; Freya Catrin Smith (additional lyrics)
- Book: David Greig
- Setting: Edinburgh; St Swithin's Day
- Basis: Novel One Day by David Nicholls
- Premiere: 11 March 2026: Royal Lyceum Theatre, Edinburgh
- Productions: 2026 Edinburgh; 2026 West End

One Day is a musical with music and lyrics by Amanda Sudano and Abner Ramirez (with additional lyrics by Freya Catrin Smith) and a book by David Greig. Based on the 2009 novel of the same name, the musical follows Emma and Dex, whose lives have taken them in different directions, but one day keeps bringing them back together.

Directed by Max Webster, the world premiere production of One Day opened in Edinburgh at the Royal Lyceum Theatre in March 2026. It is scheduled to transfer to the Garrick Theatre in London's West End from 17 November 2026. Sharon Rose and Jamie Muscato originated the roles of Em and Dex in both productions.

== Background ==
The musical is based on the 2009 novel One Day, by David Nicholls. The novel sold over six million copies worldwide and was translated into forty languages. It won the 2010 Galaxy Book of the Year, and has been adapted into a feature film and television series for Netflix. On its release in 2009, Producer Simon Friend read the novel on the tube, and subsequently tried to produce an adaption of One Day, for over a decade.

The idea for the novel came to Nicholls whilst adapting Hardy's Tess of the D'Urbervilles, a novel he had previously read as a student. He was reminded by a particular passage that indicated that one date, held more significance to Tess than any other. "There it was again; that ordinary day that turns out not to be ordinary at all."

Set in Edinburgh, the musical sees Dexter and Emma graduate on St Swithin's Day in 1988. Over the next 20 years, we see snapshots of the same day each year; showing how their lives unfold.

== Productions ==
=== World premiere ===
The musical received its world premiere at the Royal Lyceum Theatre on 11 March 2026, following previews from 27 February. Prior to opening at the Lyceum, the run was extended by two weeks until 19 April.

The theatre was reconfigured in the round, including on stage cabaret style seating. Initial casting was announced on St Swithin's Day 2025, with Jamie Muscato playing Dexter and Sharon Rose as Emma. Further principal casting included Josefina Gabrielle as Alison Mayhew, Miracle Chance as Tilly, Dan Buckley as Ian, Kelly Hampson as Sylvie, Peter Hannah as Callum, David Birrell as Stephen, and Matthew McKenna as Mr Godalming.

The production has a book by the former Artistic Director of the Lyceum David Greig and features a score by Johnnyswim members Abner and Amanda Ramirez. Set and costume designs are by Rae Smith, with lighting by Bruno Poet, sound design by Simon Baker, arrangements by Nigel Lilley, and orchestrations by Simon Hale. It is directed by Max Webster, with choreography by Carrie-Anne Ingrouille.

The Gross book office income was the highest of any production in the theatres history.

=== West End ===
On 18 June 2026, it was announced that the production was transferring to the Garrick Theatre in London's West End. It is scheduled to run from 17 November 2026 until 14 March 2027. The West End production is performed with a traditional proscenium arch, rather than the in the round format used by the original production. At the time of the announcement it was revealed that the original leads Sharon Rose and Jamie Muscato would continue their roles as Emma and Dexter in the West End. In October, it was announced that original cast members Dan Buckley and Kelly Hampson would also continue, with all other roles recast.

Prior to opening in the West End a video of Muscato singing the song You was released.

== Musical numbers ==
Act I

- "One Day - Opening"
- "Blackbirds"
- "Make A Life Worth Living"
- "Loco Caliente"
- "Taj Mahal"
- "Em and Dex"
- "Night Swimming"
- "The Lifestyle"
- "Make A Life Worth Living (Reprise)"
- "Pick Up, Em"
- "Showbiz"
- "Em's One Day"

Act II

- "It's My Day"
- "The Maze"
- "River Lights"
- "Showbiz (Reprise)"
- "You"
- "Em and Dex (Reprise)"
- "Blackbirds (Reprise)"
- "Dex's One Day"
- "It All Starts Here Today"

=== Band ===
The musical uses a six piece orchestra, including keys, drums, violin, synth, cello, guitar, bass guitar and double base.

== Cast and characters ==
Character	World Premiere	West End
Character	2026	2026
Dexter Mayhew	Jamie Muscato	Jamie Muscato
Emma Morley	Sharon Rose	Sharon Rose
Alison Mayhew	Josefina Gabrielle	Anna-Jane Casey
Tilly	Miracle Chance	Romona Lewis-Malley
Sylvie	Kelly Hampson	Kelly Hampson
Ian	Dan Buckley	Dan Buckley
Callum	Peter Hannah	Dougie Carter
Stephen Mayhew	David Birrell	Christopher Dickins
Mr Godalming	Matthew McKenna	Ross Dawes
Miffy (Note: The role of Miffy was added for the West End Production.)	N/A	Jennifer Louise Jones
Jasmine/Sonia (Note: The role of Sonia was added for the West End Production.)	Ailsa Brown Imogen Brown Isla Walker	Bonnie Harper Esmae Kevany Hannah McIntyre Ava-Rae Timewell

== See also ==
- One Day (novel), 2009 novel
- One Day, 2011 feature film
- One Day (TV series), 2024 television adaption
