= Random House Studio =

American production company

- Founded: November 2005; 20 years ago
- Headquarters: New York
- Number of locations: 2
- Key people: Peter Gethers (president); Jeffrey Levine (Head of Television)
- Number of employees: 10 (2013)
- Parent: Random House (2005–2016); Fremantle North America (2016–present)
- Divisions: Random House Films; Random House Television

Random House Studio is a production company responsible for adapting books published by Penguin Random House to film and television. The company, originally owned by the Random House unit of Penguin Random House, was transferred to Bertelsmann sister company Fremantle North America in 2016.

== History ==
Random House became involved in the home video market in the early 1980s. Random House Home Video's first project was the acquirement of rights to seventeen years' worth of Sesame Street shows. This branch of Random House lasted until the late 2000s.

Random House established a book-to-film unit, Random House Films, in 2005. A Focus Features deal and a co-finance plan for reasonably budgeted, adult-oriented movies were under development at the same time.

Random House Films soon acquired the book and film rights to One Day from writer David Nicholls, allowing for simplified parallel development with an editor/producer. The book debuted in 2009, at the same time the film had begun production, and the film reached the screens in 2011. The film had a budget of $15 million and grossed $13.8 million domestically and $56.7 million globally; the book sold 1.5 million copies (with an additional 750 thousand copies of the movie edition). One Day was the film unit's most successful production.

The unit made a deal in October 2011 to create a movie franchise of Ross Macdonald's detective Lew Archer, with Joel Silver and Warner Bros.

In July 2012, Random House announced the creation of the Random House Studio (RHS) and Random House Television (RH TV). Random House Studio would contain both the TV and film divisions, and would work with affiliate Fremantle on the TV series developments. RH TV headquarters in Fremantle's Los Angeles offices and its Head of Television is Jeffrey Levine.

On July 1, 2013, RHS's parent company merged with Penguin to form Penguin Random House.

In February 2013, Focus Features and Random House Studio teamed up for film rights, production, and co-financing of Jo Baker's novel Longbourn, with the book to be published in the fall by Transworld Publishers in the U.K., Alfred A. Knopf in the U.S., and Random House in Canada.

In September 2014, Random House Studio signed a first look production deal with Universal Pictures, under which Random House would be producer on the projects developed and filmed based on Penguin Random House books. This buttresses the existing deal between Random House Films and Focus Features, a Universal subsidiary.

Heartland Table, starring chef Amy Thielen, was RH TV's first co-production (with Tavola Productions), and premiered September 14, 2014 on the Food Network. Thielen's companion book, The New Midwestern Table, was issued by Clarkson Potter, a Penguin Random House imprint, on September 24.

The studio and Jupiter Entertainment entered a deal for several unscripted programs, and Jupiter was developing three shows by July 2016.

In July 2016, Fremantle took over the company from Penguin Random House. Fremantle signed Random House Studios with Chinese Meridian Entertainment for theatrical productions while handling TV productions internally. The unscripted programs subsequently moved from Jupiter to Fremantle.

== Filmography ==
- Reservation Road (2007)
- One Day (book 2009, film 2011) writer David Nicholls
- Lay the Favorite (2012) Likely Story and Emmett/Furla Films, The Weinstein Company

Meridian Entertainment co-productions

- The Silent Land, based on a novel by Graham Joyce
- Longbourn, an adaptation of a Jo Baker novel
- City Of Light, based on the nonfiction book Death In The City Of Light by David King

=== Television ===
- Heartland Table (Food Network) (2013–2014) Tavola Productions, Food Network
- Loving Day (Showtime)
- Rachel Carson TV movie (HBO)
- No God But God - unscripted series in development original by Jupiter Entertainment
- The Knowledge (based on a book by Lewis Dartnell, currently an unscripted series in development originally by Jupiter Entertainment)
- God Made Me Do It (author Jonathan Merritt, currently an unscripted series in development originally by Jupiter Entertainment)
