= One Day (novel) =

2009 novel by David Nicholls

- First edition
- Author: David Nicholls
- Cover artist: Craig Ward
- Language: English
- Publisher: Hodder & Stoughton
- Publication date: 11 June 2009
- Publication place: United Kingdom
- Media type: Print
- Pages: 448 pp
- ISBN: 0-340-89696-5
- Preceded by: The Understudy
- Followed by: Us

One Day is a novel by David Nicholls, published in 2009. A couple spend the night together on 15 July 1988, knowing they must go their separate ways the next day. The novel then visits their lives on 15 July every year for the next 20 years. The novel attracted generally positive reviews and was named 2010 Galaxy Book of the Year. Nicholls adapted his book into a screenplay for a feature film, which was released in 2011. A television series was produced by Netflix in 2024.

== Plot ==
Dexter and Emma spend the night together after their graduation from the University of Edinburgh, on 15 July 1988. They talk about how they will be once they are 40, but the next day, they must go their separate ways.

Over the next 20 years, the novel provides a snapshot on 15 July each year, showing how their lives unfold, very differently to their expectations, including their on-again off-again relationship.

Just out of university, Emma wants to improve the world. She writes and performs plays, but they are unsuccessful. Dexter travels the world, drinking and womanizing. Eventually Emma and Dexter each relocate to London, where Emma becomes a waitress in Kentish Town, at a Tex-Mex restaurant, while Dexter becomes a television presenter.

While both make various attempts to get together, something always prevents it. They remain friends but have relationships with other people, each secretly longing for the other. They are drawn closer through a holiday together and the death of Dexter's mother.

Emma breaks up with her boyfriend, Ian, after realising she doesn't love him. During this time she finds a job as a teacher, after years of struggle, despite having a "double-first degree". Dexter, meanwhile, has become an alcoholic and drug addict, and his career collapses. Dexter's behaviour puts a strain on their friendship. Finally, after being treated rudely by Dexter at a restaurant, Emma breaks off the friendship.

At the wedding of Emma's former roommate, they meet again. Emma admits she wants Dexter back. She has just ended an affair with the headmaster of her school. However, Dexter is in a relationship with Sylvie, who is pregnant. Dexter invites Emma to his wedding.

Emma tries to overcome her problems and begins to write, while Dexter is unemployed and overwhelmed by his role as a father after his divorce from Sylvie, who was having an affair. Emma goes to Paris in the hope of writing a sequel to her first successful children's novel. Visiting Emma in Paris, Dexter learns that she has met someone else, and for the first time admits his feelings to her. Emma chooses Dexter.

Emma and Dexter marry. Emma wants a child, and they are frustrated by their failed attempts to conceive. Dexter opens a deli-café and achieves success with it.

Emma and Dexter have an appointment to see a house. On the way there, Emma is killed in a bicycle accident. In despair, Dexter starts to drink again and provokes people in bars to get beaten.

He is comforted by his ex-wife Sylvie, his father, and his daughter. Three years after Emma's death, Dexter travels with his daughter to Edinburgh, where he and Emma met, and they climb Arthur's Seat together, as he and Emma climbed it 19 years earlier.

The book ends with a vivid and lingering memory of what happened 20 years before: their goodbye kiss after the evening, promise to stay in touch, and goodbye.

== Major themes ==
Nicholls recalls that as a student, he read a passage in Thomas Hardy's 1891 novel Tess of the D'Urbervilles in which Tess realises that as well as birthdays and anniversaries "there was yet another date, of greater importance to her than those; that of her own death...a day which lay sly and unseen and among all the other days of the year, giving no sign or sound." Twenty years later, Nicholls was adapting Hardy's novel for the BBC and was reminded of the passage; "There it was again; that ordinary day that turns out not to be ordinary at all."

This gave the author the idea for a novel in which the date of a major character's death would form the basis for vignettes of the characters' lives, without the events of the other 364 days, thus avoiding the cliches of birthdays, Valentine's Day or New Year's Eve. St Swithun's Day (15 July) was chosen as it fitted with the graduation day at which the reader first encounters the characters and the "themes of unpredictability" of the proverb.

Writing in The Times, John O'Connell writes, "For, in spite of its comic gloss, One Day is really about loneliness and the casual savagery of fate; the tragic gap between youthful aspiration and the compromises that we end up tolerating. Not for nothing has Nicholls said that it was inspired by Thomas Hardy." A critic in The London Paper observes that One Day "may be a love story, but it's no fairytale: Nicholls doesn’t shy from the harsh side of growing up, the disillusionment, regrets, and random cruelty of life.". According to Jonathan Coe, writing in "Guardian Books of the Year" (2009), "It's rare to find a novel which ranges over the recent past with such authority, and even rarer to find one in which the two leading characters are drawn with such solidity, such painful fidelity, to real life."

== Reception ==
The novel attracted mainly positive reviews. Writing in The Guardian, Harry Ritchie called it "a very persuasive and endearing account of a close friendship – the delight Emma and Dexter take in one another, the flirting and the banter that sometimes hide resentment and sometimes yearning, the way the relationship shifts and evolves as the years pass." Ritchie comments, "Just as Nicholls has made full use of his central concept, so he has drawn on all his comic and literary gifts to produce a novel that is not only roaringly funny but also memorable, moving and, in its own unassuming, unpretentious way, rather profound." This story is reminiscent of Same Time, Next Year.

Elizabeth Day of The Observer also praises the novel, although criticising "its structural flaws", since "some of the most important events in their life are never recounted." Despite this, she concludes by commenting "there is no doubt that One Day is a beguiling read. But although I really liked it, I wanted desperately to love it because Nicholls is, I think, a far better writer than this format allows him to be."

The Times deflected comparisons to When Harry Met Sally..., "saccharine" assumptions, and expectations that the "more literary" will snobbishly gratify themselves that they never read "'commercial' romantic comedies with cartoons and squiggly writing on the cover. Well, be convinced: One Day is a wonderful, wonderful book: wise, funny, perceptive, compassionate and often unbearably sad. It's also, with its subtly political focus on changing habits and mores, the best British social novel since Jonathan Coe's What a Carve Up."

Author Nick Hornby also praised the book on his blog, calling it "A big, absorbing, smart, fantastically readable on-off love story." His blurb is used in some editions of the book, such as the US paperback edition.

In 2010, the novel was named Popular Fiction Book of the Year at the UK's annual Galaxy National Book Awards ceremony, and was later granted the accolade of Galaxy Book of the Year.

== Adaptations ==
=== Feature film ===
At the time of the book's publication, Nicholls wrote that he was adapting his novel as a film script. He acknowledged the difficulties in casting people who "could be both students and middle-aged! But I think we've found a way."

The film was directed by Lone Scherfig for Random House Films and Focus Features, with a theatrical release in August 2011. Anne Hathaway and Jim Sturgess portrayed Emma and Dexter, respectively. Filming took place in England, Scotland, and France.

=== Television series ===
In November 2021, it was announced that Netflix was set to adapt the novel into a television series. The writing team for the series was to be headed by Nicole Taylor, working with Anna Jordan, Vinay Patel and Bijan Sheibani and the series was to be produced by Drama Republic, Universal International Studios and Focus Features. Ambika Mod and Leo Woodall star as lead roles.

=== Musical ===
A stage musical based on the film received its world premiere in March 2026 at the Royal Lyceum Theatre in Edinburgh. It is transferring to the Garrick Theatre in London's West End, running from 17 November 2026 to 14 March 2027. Original leads Jamie Muscato and Sharon Rose will continue as Dexter and Emma.
