= Just like Home =

Just like Home may refer to:

- Just like Home (1978 film), a Hungarian film
- Just like Home (2007 film), a Danish film
