= Sweet Sorrow =

Sweet Sorrow may refer to

- Sweet Sorrow (band), South Korean vocal group
- Sweet Sorrow (novel), a 2019 novel by David Nicholls
- "Sweet Sorrow" (The Green Green Grass), a 2007 TV sitcom episode
- "Sweet Sorrow" (Heartbeat), a 2010 TV drama episode
- "Sweet Sorrow" (Upstart Crow), a 2017 TV sitcom episode
