= Lone Scherfig =

Danish film director and screenwriter (born 1959)

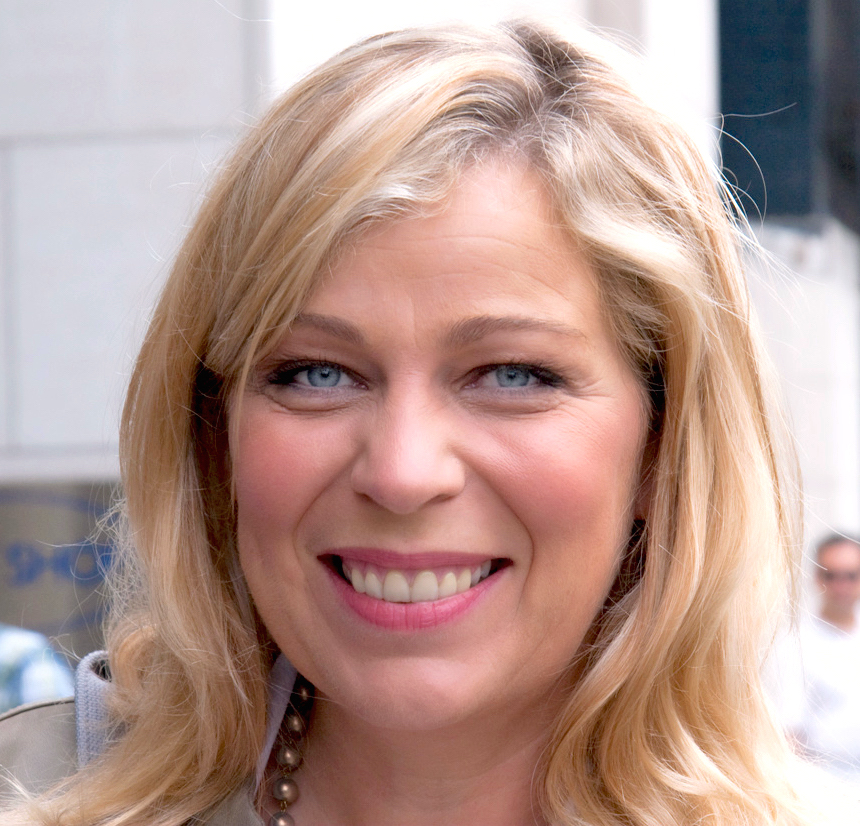
- Scherfig at the 2009 Toronto International Film Festival
- Born: 2 May 1959 (age 67); Copenhagen, Denmark
- Occupations: Film director, screenwriter

Lone Scherfig (Danish: [ˈloːnə ˈɕɛɐ̯fi]) (born 2 May 1959) is a Danish film director and screenwriter. She is especially known for her films Italian for Beginners (2000) and An Education (2009), and is also known for her romantic comedies, such as One Day (2011).

== Early life and education ==
Lone Scherfig graduated from the National Film School of Denmark in 1984.

She initially worked in the advertising business and won awards (including the Lion d'Argent) at the Cannes International Advertising Film Festival.

== Career ==
=== 1980s–1990s: beginnings ===
Scherfig began her career as a director with the television film Margrethes elsker in 1985. Her directorial debut in film came with Kaj's fodselsdag. The film was critically successful and garnered her the Grand Jury prize and the Club Espace Award at the Rouen Nordic Film Festival. For a period of time following such success, Scherfig wrote and directed a few short films, and worked with both radio shows and the stage.

She directed the film Når mor kommer hjem (1998), which received the Grand Prix at the Montreal Film Festival and the Cinekid Award in Amsterdam.

=== 2000s: Italian for Beginners ===
Scherfig made her international breakthrough with the film Italian for Beginners (2000), which was critically acclaimed and won several awards, including the Jury Grand Prix Silver Bear award at the Berlin International Film Festival. Hailed as a feel-good movie, the film is preoccupied with themes of hope, happiness, and choice. It is credited as the most profitable Scandinavian film to date.

Following the creative constraints of the Dogme 95 movement, Scherfig set the film almost entirely on location within a small space, used sound found only at the source, and shot it on video. The film involves several characters and their various romantic or other interactions that unfold across this limited setting. As opposed to many other Dogme 95 films, Scherfig's is rather upbeat and comedic. It has been noted for its rather amusing tone.

Following Italian for Beginners, Scherfig made the deadpan comedy Wilbur Wants to Kill Himself, released in 2002. This film, not considered a part of the Dogme 95 canon, is a touching movie centered on a suicidal man who is constantly saved and cared for by his brother. Noted by critics to be a surprisingly lighthearted affair, the movie was praised for Scherfig's ability to craft deep and interesting characters. Critic A.O. Scott mused that the film's tone "ranges from stoic to diffident to quizzical, at least on the surface. But there is an undercurrent of deep and complicated feeling beneath the Scottish reserve; it is signalled by the music, and by Ms. Scherfig's exquisite sense of nuance." Scherfig worked closely with the prolific writer Anders Thomas Jensen in developing a screenplay for this film. She aligned her work with the production companies Sigma Films and Zentropa. Although well received, Wilbur was not as commercially successful as Italian for Beginners. It served as a catalyst for her Dogme 95 related project called the Advance Party, in which both Scherfig and Jensen helped write characters for Lars Von Trier.

Scherfig followed this by writing and directing another character-focused film: Just Like Home, released in 2007. In this comedic endeavour, set in a little town, several characters unite to discover who could be causing a commotion in the streets at night. The movie explores the various residents of the town and their interactions with each other. Claiming constraints related to the Dogme 95, Scherfig said that the film was written piece by piece every day that it was shot. She has said the story is "about trust...the fundamental belief that people you hardly know will want the best for you." While receiving little commercial or critical spotlight, the film served as a bridge between Scherfig's earlier experiments and her more American successes.

=== 2010s: Further success, An Education ===
In 2009, An Education, Scherfig's most critically lauded film, was released. With a screenplay written by esteemed British fiction author Nick Hornby, the movie was based on journalist Lynn Barber's experiences as a teenager in post-war Britain. The film's story follows 16-year-old Jenny (played by Carey Mulligan) as she is picked up one rainy night by David (played by Peter Sarsgaard), and brought into the bustling and exciting adult London society. Centered on this tender and somewhat morally ambiguous romantic relationship between David and Jenny, the movie was hailed as being subtle and deliberate in its pacing and tone. Many reviewers noted the exceptional performance of Carey Mulligan as the protagonist. She was nominated for an Academy Award for her performance; the film was nominated for Best Picture and Nick Hornby (for Adapted Screenplay).

On making the film, Scherfig has talked about her focus on the theme of being an American teenager examined throughout the story, saying,

"my guess is about America is that it's this combination of innocence and freedom that attracts you. Here in Denmark, as well, it was more liberated than it is now, and was definitely more innocent and less dangerous. I mean, when I was a teenager, the world was a lot safer than it is now for my daughter as a teenager, which meant that I could have a lot more fun. It wasn't risky the way it is now."

She has also discussed the pleasures of working in a more collaborative spirit for this movie, commenting that the movie was "the same piece that we [were] all working on, and that was really important to me as a director that everyone was making the same film, that everyone contributed to the package and tried to strengthen it and get as many facets as possible but not be over-inventive, [to] just tell the story as well as we possibly could."

Scherfig's next film, titled One Day and released in 2011, follows the lives of two romantically engaged individuals as they intersect one day each year. Based on novel of the same name by David Nicholls and adapted by him as a screenplay, the movie marks a more turning point for Scherfig's career in reaching a larger audience than any of her previous films. The plot and story of the movie has been characterized as somewhat simple and predictable, but critics noted that Scherfig gave the dialogue and tone of the film a distinct freshness. The reputations of leading actors Anne Hathaway and Jim Sturgess both helped attract a wider audience.

Scherfig had declared her interest in working with Hathaway on this project. She also commented on the difficulties of working with someone else's screenplay, saying in an interview that:

It's so much easier to work with something you've written, because you can cut things or add things on the spot. You can be much more at home and at ease with what you do. You don't feel unfaithful to the writer because there is no writer. Most of the other films I've done I've co-written, and I prefer it. But having said that, when you work with someone else's characters, you get a lot of gifts. You get an entire world, you get to portray people that you couldn't have made up, and entire worlds that are fascinating because they are not yours. It's much harder, I really think it's much harder

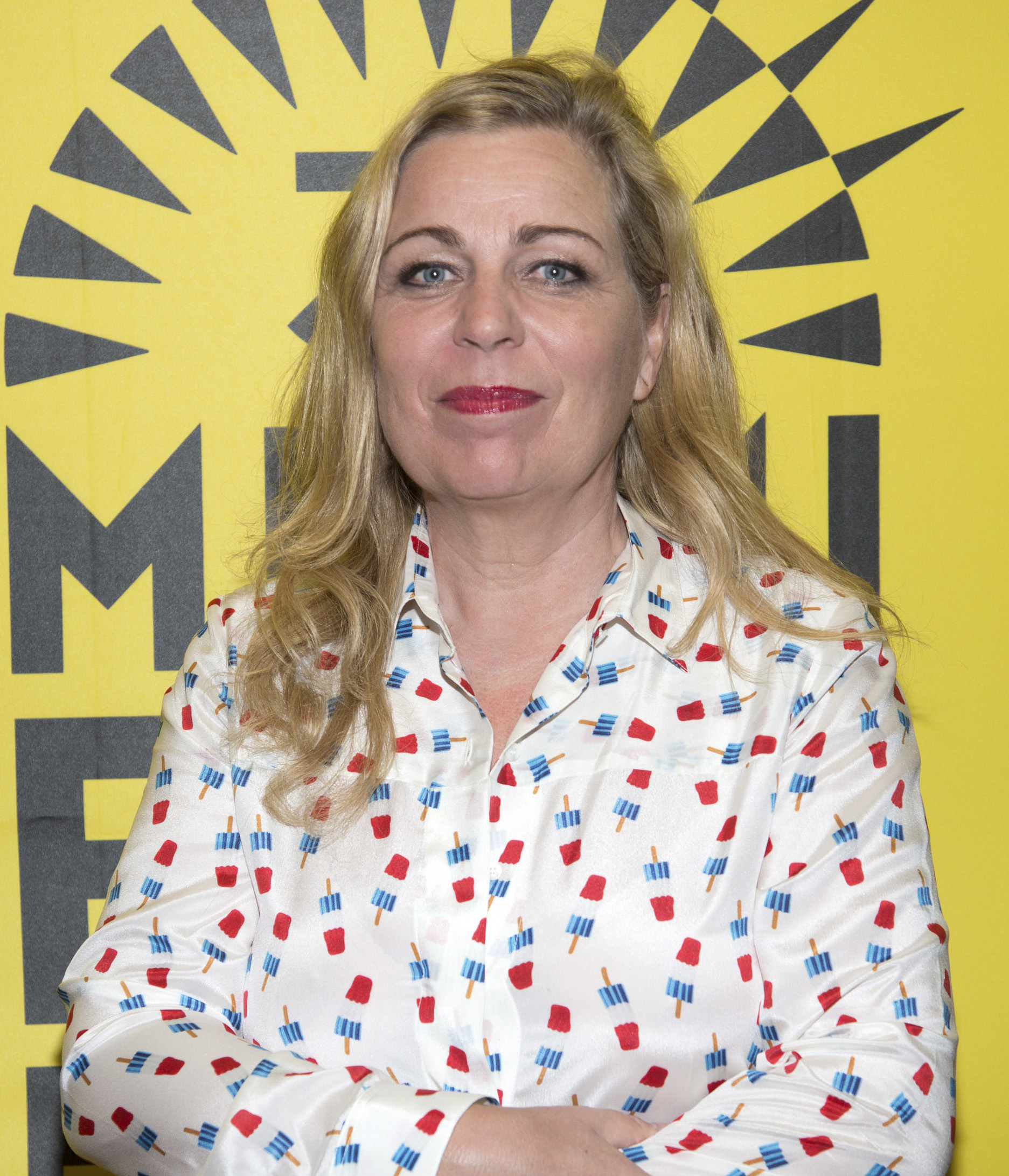
Scherfig at the 2017 Miami International Film Festival

Scherfig worked as a consultant writer for the Danish film Alting. She has worked on other projects (such as Red Road and Donkeys) in helping write and develop characters. In 2014 her film The Riot Club, based on the stage play Posh by Laura Wade, was released. The film follows two first-year students amongst the privileged elite of Oxford University, determined to join the infamous Riot Club, where reputations can be made or destroyed over the course of a single evening. Universal Pictures distributed the film in the UK and Ireland.

== Recognition and awards ==
Scherfig has come to be known in the film industry for her experimentation with creative constraints and astute attention to detail.

She has received a BAFTA nomination, a FIPRESCI Award, a Jury Prize at Berlin International Film Festival, and numerous other awards and nominations. Movies she has directed have received BAFTA and Oscar nominations, and numerous other awards and nominations.

Kaj's fødselsdag won both the Club Espace Award and the Grand Jury Prize at the Rouen Nordic Film Festival in 1991. Når mor kommer hjem won the Cinekid Film Award in 1998.

At the Berlin International Film Festival, Italian for Beginners won the FIPRESCI Prize, the Prize of Ecumenical Jury, the Reader Jury of the "Berliner Morgenpost," and the Silver Berlin Bear, and was nominated for the Golden Berlin Bear. It was also nominated for a Bodil (as was Wilbur Wants to Kill Himself and An Education). Italian for Beginners was nominated at the Chicago International Film Festival, the European Film Awards, the Goya Awards, and picked up awards at Bordeaux International Festival of Women in Cinema, the Festróia-Tróia International Film Festival, the Flaiano Film Festival, the Hamptons International Film Festival, the Paris Film Festival, the Robert Festival, the Valladolid Film Festival, and the Warsaw International Film Festival.

Wilbur Wants to Kill Himself garnered nominations from the British Independent Film Awards, the Chlotudis Awards, the Robert Festival, the Valladolid Film Festival, and came in second place at the Emden International Film Festival. It took home awards at the Festróia-Tróia International Film Festival, the Hamptons International Film Festival, the Skip City International D-Cinema Festival, the U.S. Comedy Arts Festival, and the Victoria Independent Film & Video Festival in Canada.

Although Just Like Home was shunned by critics, Scherfig's fourth film was offered the most recognition. An Education was nominated at the BAFTA Awards, the British Independent Film Awards, the European Film Awards, the Film Critics Circle of Australia Awards, the Satellite Awards, and the Academy Awards. It won various awards at the Chicago International Film Festival, the Independent Spirit Awards, the Mill Valley Film Festival, the Robert Festival, and the Sundance Film Festival.

Year	Title	Award	Work	Result	Notes
2010	British Academy Film Awards (BAFTA)	Best Director	An Education	Nominated	
2001	Berlin International Film Festival	Silver Berlin Bear	Italian for Beginners	Won	
2001	Berlin International Film Festival	Golden Berlin Bear	Italian for Beginners	Nominated	
2001	International Federation of Film Critics	FIPRESCI Award	Italian for Beginners	Won	

== Filmography ==
Film

Year	Title	Director	Writer	Notes
1990	Kaj's fødselsdag	Yes	No	
1998	Når mor kommer hjem	Yes	Yes	
2000	Italian for Beginners	Yes	Yes	
2002	Wilbur Wants to Kill Himself	Yes	Yes	
2007	Just Like Home	Yes	Yes	
2009	An Education	Yes	No	
2011	One Day	Yes	No	
2012	Alting	No	Yes	
2014	The Riot Club	Yes	No	
2016	Their Finest	Yes	No	
2019	The Kindness of Strangers	Yes	Yes	
2023	The Movie Teller	Yes	No	

TV movies

- Margrethes elsker (1985)
- Den gode lykke (1993)

TV series

Year	Title	Director	Writer	Notes
1994	Flemming og Berit	Yes	No	6 episodes
1997	Taxa	Yes	Yes	2 episodes
2000	Morten Korch – Ved stillebækken	Yes	Yes	11 episodes
2005	Krøniken	Yes	No	1 episode
2015	The Astronaut Wives Club	Yes	No	2 episodes (Also executive producer)
2022	The Shift	Yes		Creator, main author
