= Us (British TV series) =

2020 British TV comedy-drama series

- Genre: Comedy drama
- Written by: David Nicholls
- Directed by: Geoffrey Sax
- Starring: Tom Hollander; Saskia Reeves
- Country of origin: United Kingdom
- Original language: English
- No. of series: 1
- No. of episodes: 4

Production
- Producers: Roanna Benn; Greg Brenman; Tom Hollander
- Running time: 55:00

Original release
- Network: BBC One
- Release: 20 September – 11 October 2020

Us is a 2020 British television comedy-drama series based on the book Us by English author David Nicholls and adapted by him for the screen. The series stars Tom Hollander and Saskia Reeves as a married couple, the Petersens.

The series is directed by Geoffrey Sax and has original music composed by Oli Julian.

== Synopsis ==
As their son, Albie, is about to leave home for university, married couple, Douglas and Connie Petersen (Tom Hollander and Saskia Reeves), have made plans to go on a "holiday of a lifetime", touring Europe. Connie, frustrated after 24 years together, tells her inhibited, orderly and risk-averse biochemist husband, Douglas, that now that Albie is leaving home, she no longer wants to stay married to him. The story follows Douglas and the family over the course of the holiday as he tries to win back the love of Connie. As their holiday progresses, the series alternates between the present day and flashbacks that show how the young Douglas (Iain De Caestecker) and Connie (Gina Bramhill) met.

== Cast and characters ==
- Tom Hollander as Douglas Petersen
- Saskia Reeves as Connie Petersen
- Tom Taylor as Albie Petersen
- Iain De Caestecker as young Douglas
- Gina Bramhill as young Connie
- Thaddea Graham as Kat
- Sofie Gråbøl as Freja
- Charlotte Spencer as Karen Petersen

== Production ==
The series was filmed between July and October 2019.

Compared with the novel there was a reduction in the overall number of destinations due to budgetary and logistical reasons. Even so four crews were employed with over 162 sets with filming undertaken in London, Buckinghamshire, Paris, Amsterdam, Venice, and Barcelona. For economic reasons many train scenes were filmed in real time on real trains.

The series first aired on the BBC in September 2020.

== Reception ==
The review aggregator website Rotten Tomatoes reported an approval rating of 93% based on 15 reviews, with an average rating of 7.01/10. Metacritic, which uses a weighted average, assigned a score of 76 out of 100 based on 8 critics, indicating "generally favorable reviews".

== Episodes ==
No. overall	No. in season	Title	Directed by	Written by	Original release date	Viewers (millions)
1	1	"Episode 1"	Geoffrey Sax	David Nicholls	20 September 2020	6.58
Douglas Petersen is looking forward to a tour of Europe with his wife Connie and his son Albie. It is meant to be the trip of a lifetime and the last chance for some quality time together as a family. But in spite of Douglas's meticulous preparation and planning, things do not work out quite as planned.
2	2	"Episode 2"	Geoffrey Sax	David Nicholls	27 September 2020	5.85
Despite a rocky start in Paris, the European tour continues. Next stop: Amsterdam, where it seems that nothing can prevent the family from getting into the holiday spirit.
3	3	"Episode 3"	Geoffrey Sax	David Nicholls	4 October 2020	5.38
4	4	"Episode 4"	Geoffrey Sax	David Nicholls	11 October 2020	5.27
Now he has found Albie, Douglas’s dogged determination to keep his family together must be enough to win his son back, and change Connie’s feelings.
