= One Day (2011 film) =

2011 romantic drama film by Lone Scherfig

- Theatrical release poster
- Directed by: Lone Scherfig
- Screenplay by: David Nicholls
- Based on: One Day by David Nicholls
- Produced by: Nina Jacobson
- Starring: Anne Hathaway; Jim Sturgess; Patricia Clarkson; Ken Stott; Romola Garai
- Cinematography: Benoît Delhomme
- Edited by: Barney Pilling
- Music by: Rachel Portman
- Production companies: Random House Films; Film4; Color Force
- Distributed by: Focus Features (United States); Universal Pictures (United Kingdom)
- Release dates: 8 August 2011 (New York City premiere); 19 August 2011 (United States); 24 August 2011 (United Kingdom)
- Running time: 108 minutes
- Countries: United States; United Kingdom
- Language: English
- Budget: $15 million
- Box office: $59.4 million

One Day is a 2011 romantic drama film directed by Lone Scherfig from a screenplay by David Nicholls, based on Nicholls' 2009 novel of the same name. It stars Anne Hathaway and Jim Sturgess, with Patricia Clarkson, Ken Stott and Romola Garai in supporting roles. It was released in the United States on 19 August 2011 by Focus Features and in the United Kingdom on 24 August 2011 by Universal Pictures.

After meeting and spending the night together on St. Swithun's Day on the eve of their college graduation, Dexter and Emma are shown each year over 20 years on this same date.

A television series adaptation of the same source novel, starring Ambika Mod and Leo Woodall was released on Netflix in 2024.

== Plot ==
Dexter Mayhew and Emma Morley meet every 15 July—St. Swithin's Day—over 20 years. Dexter is from a southern, wealthy, upper-class family, privately educated at Winchester College whilst Emma is from a working-class family from northern England. On 15 July 1988, after graduation from the University of Edinburgh, they spend a platonic night together, agreeing to "just be friends."

One year later, Dexter helps Emma move to London to become a writer before heading to India. Finding little success by 1990, she starts working in a Mexican restaurant, where she meets Ian, an aspiring comedian and sci-fi buff.

World traveller Dexter works as a TEFL teacher in Paris. Visiting Emma on 15 July 1991, he suggests they take a holiday, so the next year they travel to Dinard. Despite their mutual attraction, Emma turns down Dexter's advances as he lacks commitment.

By 1993, Dexter is a successful television presenter on a raucous late-night show. Visiting his parents on 15 July 1994 after his mother's terminal cancer diagnosis, he arrives still inebriated from last night's partying, infuriating his father. Unimpressed with Dexter's wild lifestyle, his mother tells him he is not yet a nice person. That night, Emma has a first date with Ian; despite their lack of chemistry, they begin a relationship.

By 1995, Emma has become a schoolteacher and lives with Ian, who increasingly irritates her. Dexter's new show makes him "the most annoying man on telly". Meeting Emma for dinner on 15 July 1996, Dexter gets high on cocaine, flirts with another, and insults Emma quoting George Bernard Shaw, "Those who can, do; those who can't, teach.” Storming off, she declares they have outgrown each other, telling him that although she loves him, she no longer likes him.

Two years later, now mid-30, Dexter loses his television career, failing to capture younger audiences, and by 1999, is in a serious relationship with Sylvie. Meanwhile, Emma has split up with Ian; who confronts her over their breakup and his jealousy of Dexter after reading her diary whilst she reminds him she pays the mortgage and despises Star Trek II: The Wrath of Khan, Ian's obsession.

Before leaving, Ian nonetheless praises her short stories, urging her to have them published. On 15 July 2000, Emma and Dexter attend the wedding of mutual friends. His old roommate Callum, now very wealthy, offers him a job. Emma reveals she has received a book deal, and Dexter that he is engaged to a pregnant Sylvie. Dexter and Emma rekindle their friendship.

By 2001, Dexter is a devoted father to Jasmine and unaware Sylvie is cheating with Callum. Emma's book is published. Two years pass, and Dexter is divorced. He travels to Paris on the Eurostar to visit successful author Emma, who lives there.

Hopeful after a previous drunken tryst with Emma following his divorce, Dexter learns of her new French, jazz musician boyfriend Jean-Pierre, so he departs. Having second thoughts, Emma chases after Dexter. They share a passionate kiss on the banks of Canal Saint-Martin and finally begin a relationship.

Emma and Dexter are engaged by 2004 and eventually marry. Dexter opens a café in England, sharing custody of Jasmine, and he and Emma try, unsuccessfully, to have a child. On 15 July 2006, Emma is killed by a lorry whilst riding her bicycle.

Inconsolable, Dexter returns to being self-destructive. Over the years, he is comforted by Sylvie, Jasmine, his widowed father, and even Ian, now working in insurance and happily married with children, who visits Dexter and tells him Emma "lit up" around him, assuring him that "she made you decent... and you made her so happy".

On 15 July 2011, Dexter visits Arthur's Seat in Edinburgh with Jasmine. The film flashes back to 1988: after their night together, Dexter declines Emma's invitation to spend the day together, but changes his mind. They climb Arthur's Seat and at the top, he suggests that instead of being casual friends, they "finish what they started" the previous night. Racing back to the flat, they bump into Dexter's parents. Emma leaves, and Dexter tells them she is just a friend, but chases after her for her number. They kiss passionately, and promise to see one another again.

== Cast ==
- Anne Hathaway as Emma Morley
- Jim Sturgess as Dexter Mayhew
- Romola Garai as Sylvie Cope
- Rafe Spall as Ian, Emma's comedian boyfriend
- Ken Stott as Steven, Dexter's father
- Patricia Clarkson as Alison, Dexter's mother
- Jodie Whittaker as Tilly, Emma's university friend
- Tom Mison as Callum, Dexter's university friend
- Jamie Sives as Mr. Jamie Hazeel
- Toby Regbo as Samuel Cope, Sylvie's brother
- Georgia King as Suki Meadows, girlfriend of Dexter
- Matt Berry as Aaron
- Matthew Beard as Murray Cope, Sylvie's brother
- Heida Reed as Ingrid
- Amanda Fairbank Hynes as Tara
- Gamma Ray Dali as Emma Morley (Anne Hathaway body double)

== Production ==
The film is a co-production between Random House Films and Focus Features. Film4 Productions is co-financing.

Actress Anne Hathaway said she was clandestinely given the script as the film was set in the United Kingdom and director Scherfig was not looking for any American actresses for the part. Hathaway flew to London for a meeting with Scherfig to explain why she should get the part. Hathaway later said it was "the worst meeting of my life... I was just inarticulate", but on leaving Hathaway wrote out a list of songs for Scherfig to listen to, saying, "I clearly didn't communicate to you what I needed to today. But I think these songs can do it for me." Scherfig did listen to them, which led to Hathaway getting the part.

Principal photography commenced in July 2010. Filming took place on location in Scotland, England and France. The production filmed in Edinburgh, the city where Dexter and Emma first meet, in August 2010. Various landmark locations, including Arthur's Seat, were used. Production then moved to London. Parliament Hill Lido in north London was used for scenes in which Emma, of varying ages, swims. Filming took place inside a house in Granville Road in Stroud Green for scenes involving Jim Sturgess and Romola Garai. Scenes in the shop and cafe were filmed at Leila's shop and cafe on Arnold Circus, close to Brick Lane in the East End. UK railway station filming took place at Ridgmont Station on the Bedford to Bletchley Marston Vale Line. Filming in France took place in Dinan and Dinard, near Saint-Malo, in Brittany. A seaside club was turned into the Café Paradis, designed to ape Greek themes.

== Critical reception ==
On Rotten Tomatoes the film has a 36% approval rating based on 143 reviews, with an average rating of 5.1/10. The site's consensus states: "Despite some fresh narrative twists, One Day lacks the emotion, depth, or insight of its bestselling source material". On Metacritic, it has a score of 48% based on reviews from 41 critics, indicating "mixed or average reviews". CinemaScore polls reported that the average grade moviegoers gave the film was a "B−" on an A+ to F scale.

Betsy Sharkey of the Los Angeles Times called it a "heartbreaking disappointment of a film" while Peter Howell of the Toronto Star said "Long before the credits roll, you may find yourself wishing your life could flash before your eyes, to end the monotony of this relentless turning of calendar pages." In contrast, Roger Ebert gave the film three stars out of four, saying, "One Day has style, freshness, and witty bantering dialogue." Anne Hathaway's Yorkshire accent in the role of Emma was regarded as subpar by the newspaper columnist Suzanne Moore. Reviewing the film on BBC Radio 4's Front Row, she said the accents were "all over the shop". Moore went on to say, "Sometimes she's from Scotland, sometimes she's from New York, you just can't tell".

== Soundtrack ==
One Day (Original Motion Picture Soundtrack)

Soundtrack album by Various Artists
- Released: August 16, 2011
- Genres: Alternative rock Electronic; Pop
- Label: Island

No.	Title	Artist	Length
1.	"Sparkling Day"	Elvis Costello	4:46
2.	"Roll to Me"	Del Amitri	2:12
3.	"Aftermath" (Hip Hop Blues)	Tricky	7:39
4.	"Reverend Black Grape"	Black Grape	5:11
5.	"Born of Frustration"	James	4:36
6.	"Rocks"	Primal Scream	3:35
7.	"Praise You" (One Day OST Version)	Fatboy Slim	5:22
8.	"The Rhythm of the Night"	Corona	3:24
9.	"Angels"	Robbie Williams	3:58
10.	"Life Is a Rollercoaster"	Ronan Keating	3:55
11.	"Sowing the Seeds of Love"	Tears for Fears	6:15
12.	"Joy"	François Feldman	4:06
13.	"Tear Off Your Own Head (It's a Doll Revolution)"	Elvis Costello	3:31
14.	"One Day Main Titles"	Rachel Portman	1:53
15.	"Wedding Chorus"	Rachel Portman	1:38
16.	"July 15th"	Rachel Portman	1:37
17.	"We Had Today"	Rachel Portman	3:43

== Television series ==
In 2024 Netflix screened a television series written by Nicole Taylor, working with Anna Jordan, Vinay Patel and Bijan Sheibani. It was produced by Drama Republic, Universal International Studios and Focus Features. Ambika Mod and Leo Woodall starred in the lead roles.

== See also ==
- Same Time, Next Year (1978)
