= Rescue Me (British TV series) =

- Genre: Romantic comedy
- Written by: David Nicholls
- Starring: Sally Phillips
- Theme music composer: Raynard Miner and Carl Smith
- Opening theme: "Rescue Me" by Oliver Darley
- Ending theme: Reprise
- Composer: Matt Dunkley
- Country of origin: United Kingdom
- Original language: English
- No. of series: 1
- No. of episodes: 6

Production
- Executive producers: Greg Brenman; Gareth Neame
- Producer: Christine Langan
- Running time: 60 minutes
- Production company: Tiger Aspect Productions

Original release
- Network: BBC One
- Release: 3 March – 7 April 2002

Rescue Me is a British romantic comedy television series produced by Tiger Aspect Productions and broadcast on BBC One in 2002. It was created, and principally written, by David Nicholls and stars Sally Phillips as Katie Nash, a woman who is recovering from a divorce while at the same time writing relationship features for Eden, the women's magazine she works on. The series was filmed from November to December 2001. It ran for six episodes, averaging 3.4 million viewers and a 15% audience share in its Sunday night timeslot. The low ratings meant it was not recommissioned for a second series, leaving an unresolved cliffhanger. Nicholls had written four episodes of the unmade second series before discovering Rescue Me had been cancelled. As a result, he took a break from screenwriting to concentrate on his debut novel Starter for Ten. A cover version of "Rescue Me", performed by Oliver Darley, is the series theme tune.

== Cast ==
- Sally Phillips as Katie Nash, a feature writer on a magazine.
- Stewart Wright as Eddie Chisholm, the sub-editor who is Katie's shoulder to cry on.
- Oliver Chris as Luke Chatwin, the humorous photographer.
- James Lance as Guy, the magazine art director.
- Eliza Bennett as Natasha Bell, the deputy editor.
- Vincent Regan as Matthew Nash, Katie's husband.
- Sasha Behar as Emma Peters, the editor.
- Andrea Lowe as Melanie Woods, Emma's PA.

== Episodes ==
No.	Title	Directed by	Written by	Original release date
1	"Episode 1"	Kate Dennis	David Nicholls	3 March 2002
2	"Episode 2"	Kate Dennis	David Nicholls	10 March 2002
3	"Episode 3"	Kate Dennis	David Nicholls	17 March 2002
4	"Episode 4"	Julian Holmes	David Nicholls	24 March 2002
5	"Episode 5"	Julian Holmes	Oliver Brown	31 March 2002
6	"Episode 6"	Christine Langan	David Nicholls	7 April 2002
