= You Are Here (TV series) =

British television series

- Based on: You Are Here by David Nichols
- Screenplay by: David Nichols
- Directed by: Lenny Abrahamson
- Starring: Claire Foy; Matthew Macfadyen
- Country of origin: United Kingdom
- Original language: English
- No. of series: 1

Production
- Executive producers: Lenny Abrahamson; Anna Ferguson; Claire Foy; Ed Guiney; Andrew Lowe; Matthew Macfadyen; David Nichols; Emma Norton; Jonny Richards
- Producer: Claire Shepherd
- Production company: Element Pictures

Original release
- Network: BBC One; Starz

You Are Here is an upcoming BBC television series adapted by David Nichols from his own novel of the same name. It is directed by Lenny Abrahamson and starring Claire Foy and Matthew Macfadyen.

== Premise ==
A couple meet for the first time on a walking holiday from The Lake District planned by a mutual friend.

== Cast ==
- Claire Foy as Marnie
- Matthew Macfadyen as Michael
- Karla Crome as Cleo
- Tom Stourton as Conrad
- Josiah Green-Mhlanga as Anthony

== Production ==
The series was announced by the BBC and Starz in July 2026. The series is produced by Element Pictures. Lenny Abrahamson is the series director, with David Nichols adapting his own novel You Are Here into the eight-part series. Nicholls had previously stated in 2024 that discussions about an adaptation had been ongoing.

Nicholls and Abrahamson are both also executive producers alongside Claire Foy and Matthew MacFadyen who were announced as leading the cast. Ed Guiney, Andrew Lowe and Emma Norton are executive producers for Element Pictures with Jonny Richards and Anna Ferguson for the BBC. The series producer is Clare Shepherd.

In August 2026, Foy and Mcfadyen were joined in the cast by Josiah Green-Mhlanga, Karla Crome and Tom Stourton.

Filming took place in late-2026, with filming locations including Manchester, The Lake District and Richmond, North Yorkshire.
