= Starter for Ten (musical) =

2024 stage musical

- Production logo
- Music: Hatty Carman; Tom Rasmussen
- Lyrics: Hatty Carman; Tom Rasmussen; Emma Hall; Charlie Parham
- Book: Emma Hall; Charlie Parham
- Basis: Starter For Ten (novel) by David Nicholls; Starter for 10 (film)
- Premiere: 29 February 2024: Bristol Old Vic
- Productions: 2024 Bristol; 2025 Bristol and Birmingham

Starter for Ten is a British stage musical based on the 2003 novel of the same name by David Nicholls, and its 2006 film adaptation. It has music and lyrics by Hatty Carman and Tom Rasmussen, and book and lyrics by Emma Hall and Charlie Parham.

== Production history ==
=== World premiere: Bristol (2024) ===
The musical had its world premiere at the Bristol Old Vic beginning previews on 29 February 2024 (with a press night on 7 March) for a limited run until 30 March. The production is directed by Charlie Parham, choreographed by Shelley Maxwell, designed by Frankie Bradshaw, sound design by Gregory Clarke with Will Burton as casting director and Nick Barstow as music supervisor.

=== Bristol revival and Birmingham (2025) ===
The musical was restaged at the Bristol Old Vic from 10 September to 11 October 2025, before transferring to the Birmingham Repertory Theatre from 22 October to 1 November 2025. Mel Giedroyc reprised her role as Irene / Julia Bland. Full casting was announced on 3 June 2025.

== Cast and characters ==
Character	Bristol	Bristol / Birmingham
Character	2024	2025
Rebecca	Eubha Akilade	Asha Parker Wallace
Spencer	Stephenson Ardern-Sodje	Christian Maynard
Brian Jackson	Adam Bregman	Adam Bregman
Lucy	Miracle Chance	Miracle Chance
Irene / Julia Bland	Mel Giedroyc	Mel Giedroyc
Patrick	Will Jennings	Will Jennings
Des	Luke Johnson	Luke Johnson
Professor Bowman	Gemma Knight-Jones	Rachel John
Alice	Emily Lane	Imogen Craig
Mrs Harbinson	Natasha O’Brien	Michelle Bishop
Bamber Gascoigne	Robert Portal	Stephen Ashfield
Young Brian	Finlay Blackman William Hall Rockingham Ooi-Griffiths	Robert Bambridge Miles Martin Raphael Rees

== Song List ==
As per the 2025 production at the Bristol Old Vic

Act 1

- Starter for Ten – Bamber and Company
- Growing Pains – Brian
- Fresh Meat – Full Company
- Touched by an Angel– Brian and Company
- Time to Quiz – Patrick, Lucy, Brian, Alice and Colin
- Lucy’s Turn – Lucy
- Buckle Up – Full Company
- For the Story – Alice
- The Christmas Special – Bamber and Company
- Heroes – Rebecca, Brian and Company

Act 2

- Weightless – Full Company
- Time to Shine – Julia Bland, Patrick, Lucy, Alice and Brian
- Heroes (reprise) – Rebecca and Dr Bowman
- Whiplash – Full Company
- Everything Grows – Irene and Brian
- The Final Round – Full Company
- Falling With You – Full Company
