= The Witches (musical) =

Musical

Roald Dahl's The Witches
- Poster for the original production
- Music: Dave Malloy
- Lyrics: Dave Malloy; Lucy Kirkwood
- Book: Lucy Kirkwood
- Basis: The Witches by Roald Dahl
- Premiere: 7 November 2023: Olivier Theatre, National Theatre, London
- Productions: 2023 London

The Witches (or Roald Dahl's The Witches) is a stage musical with book and lyrics by Lucy Kirkwood and music and lyrics by Dave Malloy, based on Roald Dahl's 1983 children's novel of the same name.

== Production history ==
=== World premiere: London (2023–24) ===
The musical had its world premiere in the Olivier Theatre at the National Theatre, London as a co-production with the Roald Dahl Story Company on 21 November 2023 (following previews from 7 November), running until 27 January 2024. The production will be directed by Lyndsey Turner and choreographed by Stephen Mear.

Full casting was announced on 4 September 2023 including Katherine Kingsley as the Grand High Witch, Daniel Rigby as Mr. Stringer and Sally Ann Triplett as Gran.

A recording of the National Theatre cast was released on 27 June 2025.

== Premise ==
A boy and his grandmother live in a world run by witches, and The Grand High Witch is planning to turn the world's children into mice.

== Musical numbers ==
Act I

- "A Note about Witches" – The Witches
- "Ready to Go" – Luke and Young Company
- "How to Recognise a Witch" – Gran and Young Company
- "Heartbeat Duet" – Luke and Gran
- "Magnificent" – Mr Stringer and Hotel Staff
- "Bruno Sweet Bruno" – Bruno and Company
- "Processional" – Melanie and the Witches
- "One Day" – Grand High Witc and the Witches
- "Metamorphosis" – Grand High Witch and the Witches
- "Down with Children" – The Witches

Act II

- "Don't Say Mice" – Mr Stringer, Luke, Bruno, and Hotel Staff
- "When I Was Young" – Gran
- "Wouldn't It Be Nice?" – Grand High Witch
- "Out! Out! Out!" – Mr and Mrs Jenkins, Mr Stringer, Grand High Witch, Gran, and Hotel Guests & Staff
- "Get Up" – Helga and Hotel Kids
- "Bon Appétit" – Chef Chevalier
- "Kitchen Caper" – Luke and Kitchen Staff
- "Get Up (Reprise)" – Luke and Young Company
- "Soup Time" – Kitchen Staff, Mr Stringer, and the Witches
- "The Heart of a Mouse" – Gran, Luke, and Company

== Cast and characters ==
Character	London
Character	2023
Grand High Witch	Katherine Kingsley
Gran	Sally Ann Triplett
Mr Stringer	Daniel Rigby
Luke	Bertie Caplan Frankie Keita Vishal Soni
Bruno	Cian Eagle-Service George Menezes Cutts William Skinner
Helga	Jersey Blu Georgia Asanda Abbie Masike Chloe Raphael
Helen / Social Worker	Julie Armstrong
Melanie / Ensemble	Chrissie Bhima
Pippa	Zoe Birkett
Leticia / Potwasher	Maddison Bulleyment
Carol / Denise	Miracle Chance
Alison	Daniele Coombe
Dad / Sous Chef	Richard David-Caine
Pamela	Molly-May Gardiner
Kathy	Tiffany Graves
Head Waiter	Adrian Grove
Chef Chevalier / Doctor	Irvine Iqbal
Swing	Emily Langham
Emily	Bobbie Little
Bernice / Nurse	Tania Mathurin
Shelia	Amira Matthews
Kevin / Commis Chef	Jacob Maynard
Winnie / Mum	Laura Medforth
Mr Jenkins	Ekow Quartey
Chloe's Dad / Potager	Ben Redfern
Mrs Jenkins / Jan	Maggie Service
Cheryl	Alexandra Waite-Roberts

== Production team ==
Role	London
Role	2023
Director	Lyndsey Turner
Set and Costume	Lizzie Clachan
Choreographer	Stephen Mear
Music Supervisor	Nigel Lilley
Music director	Cat Beveridge
Lighting Designer	Bruno Poet
Co-Sound Designer	Alexander Caplen
Co-Sound Designer	Ian Dickinson
Video Designer	Ash J Woodward
Illusions	Chris Fisher & Will Houston
Casting Director	Bryony Jarvis-Taylor

== Critical reception ==
Reviews were positive, with The New York Times calling it a "deftly rendered production, a high-quality piece of family entertainment that skilfully blends the playful and the macabre, and does justice to the author’s distinct comic style.". The Independent and Time Out London both gave it 5 stars, Time Out calling it "a hysterically funny triumph". BroadwayWorld also gave it 5 stars, saying it "combines exuberant fun, quick-witted comedy and a positive attitude towards death to produce an enthralling, clever and incredibly funny production.".
