= The Understudy (novel) =

2005 novel by David Nicholls

- First edition
- Author: David Nicholls
- Language: English
- Publisher: Hodder & Stoughton
- Publication date: 2005
- Publication place: United Kingdom
- Pages: 406
- ISBN: 978-0-340-93521-7
- Preceded by: Starter for Ten
- Followed by: One Day

The Understudy is a 2005 novel by David Nicholls.

== Plot summary ==
Stephen C. McQueen is an actor living in London. Unlike his namesake, the famous Hollywood star, Stephen does not enjoy success, even though he considers himself very good at his profession. His career basically consists of "playing" dead people, i.e. victims of TV crimes, and the eponymous leading role in Sammy the Squirrel Sings Favourite Nursery Rhymes. He lives in a bedsit, and cannot even afford a refrigerator. His wife Alison left him for another man.

Often daydreaming about famous actors and their best scenes, Stephen is still looking for his own break-through as an actor. Meanwhile, he focuses on his job as understudy to Josh Harper, who plays Lord Byron on stage of the Hyperion Theatre on Shaftesbury Avenue. Josh, only recently voted the 12th sexiest man in the world, is the star of the show and embarking on a Hollywood career, having already collected a BAFTA award and waiting the release of his first major action blockbuster. Stephen dislikes Josh for his superficiality and envies him. One day he comes close to replacing the star of the show, when he is already in costume, before Josh appears in the nick of time. Stephen does not get to star that night, instead switching to his usual non-speaking extra role as a lycra-clad ghost that opens the door for Lord Byron (Josh) at the end of the play, and closes it behind him. Even Stephen's face is covered.

Josh knows that it would be his understudy's big chance, if he really was unavailable to act. He apologizes to Stephen for practically having him pulled off the stage last minute. He wants to make up for it by inviting Stephen to a party at his home. Stephen accepts, only to realize upon arriving at Josh's place that the invitation was meant to be a job offer. Josh introduces him to the caterers not as a guest, but as a fellow caterer. Since Stephen is too embarrassed to leave, he stays and serves drinks. He helps himself to a number of drinks, but underestimates the effects the alcohol has in combination with some medication he took. He meets Josh's wife, Nora, who hates to be at the party herself. Nora takes Stephen to the roof-top, in order to get away from Josh and his friends. Stephen knows that Josh's marriage has seen better times, and Nora mocks her husband. Both get drunk, and Nora eventually has to call a cab for Stephen.

The next day Stephen suffers from a major hangover. To his surprise, he finds Josh's BAFTA award in his bed. He stole it the night before. To make things worse, it's his day with his daughter Sophie, who lives with his ex-wife. Stephen picks her up late and hung-over, and their day together does not go well. The only good development in Stephen's life seems to be Nora, because Josh's American wife does not have many friends in London. She and Stephen begin to meet as friends, much to Stephen's delight. However, the situation grows complicated, once Stephen incidentally discovers that Josh is having an affair with the female lead of their play. Josh tries to explain himself and asks Stephen not to tell Nora about the affair. He also offers that he could pretend to be unavailable to act for a couple of days, which would give Stephen an occasion to star in the play. Stephen, who realizes that he has fallen in love with Nora, promises not to tell her, on the condition that Josh end the affair.

When Josh asks Stephen to cover up for him, in order that he can meet with yet another women, Stephen secretly passes information about the meeting point to the press. A yellow press scandal ensues, leaving Nora in desperation. She turns to Stephen. Even though he feels terrible about his role in the revelation, he invites Nora to stay at his place. The same night Stephen finds Nora almost lifeless from boozing and taking medication. He takes care of her, and takes her to bed when she drunkenly tries to seduce him. However, the next day Nora stumbles upon her husband's hidden BAFTA award and confronts Stephen about it. Also, she realizes that Stephen knew about Josh's affair. He tries to apologize and confesses his love to Nora. She leaves, enraged, and upon following her outside Stephen is intercepted by Josh, who had been looking for him. Josh punches and threatens Stephen, believing that he has been having an affair with his wife. When Josh starts beating Stephen Nora begs him to stop. As Josh continues attacking, Nora hits him in the face with his own BAFTA award.

Josh needs to be hospitalized. Stephen takes his place on stage. Since the show is missing its star, people return their tickets and hardly anybody comes to see his understudy. Nevertheless, Stephen's ex-wife and Sophie, his daughter, make it to the play. Stephen almost cannot take the pressure, but in the end delivers a decent performance. Sophie loves him for it, and even Alison apologizes for her disbelief in Stephen.

Stephen gets fired after his one and only evening performance. Josh has seen to it. When Stephen gets home, he finds Nora waiting for him. Together they leave for Paris.

== Characters ==
- Stephen C. McQueen – Not related to the Hollywood actor. Stage and movie actor, desperate to get a chance to deliver his break-through performance.
- Josh Harper – 12th sexiest man in the world and emerging superstar. Steven is Josh's understudy in a London theatre run. Josh is a notorious heart-breaker and Star Wars fan.
- Nora Harper – Former aspiring pop music star gone waitress. She met Josh in a diner and has moved with him to England.
