= Us (novel) =

2014 novel by David Nicholls

- First edition
- Author: David Nicholls
- Language: English
- Publisher: Hodder and Stoughton (UK); Harper (US)
- Publication date: Sep 2014 (UK); Oct 2014 (US)
- Publication place: United Kingdom
- Media type: Print
- Pages: 416
- ISBN: 0-340-89699-X
- Preceded by: One Day
- Followed by: Sweet Sorrow

Us is a 2014 novel by English author David Nicholls for whom it won the Specsavers "UK Author of the Year" award. It was also long-listed for the 2014 Man Booker Prize. The BBC screened a four-part TV adaptation of the novel, by Nicholls, in 2020, starring Tom Hollander, Saskia Reeves and Tom Taylor. In Canada, the Canadian Broadcasting Corporation (CBC) broadcast it as a six-episode mini-series.

== Plot introduction ==
The book begins when Connie, frustrated artist and Douglas Petersen's wife of nearly 25 years, tells him that because their son Albie is about to leave home for college, she wants to leave too. Douglas resolves that their last family holiday together, a 'grand tour' of the cultural and artistic gems of Europe, will "be the trip of a lifetime, one that will draw the three of them closer, and win the respect of his son. One that will make Connie fall in love with him all over again".

The narrative then alternates between the story of the disastrous trip, at the start of which Albie deserts his parents in Amsterdam, and that of Douglas's unlikely courtship and marriage to Connie, contrasting his disciplined scientific life as a biochemist with Connie's spontaneous artistic character.

== Reception ==
Tim Auld in The Telegraph, praised the novel, concluding "Us is a quiet joy, written with an undemonstrative simplicity that is hard to achieve. It’s also a novel that captures the zeitgeist and will speak to many middle-aged people who find that their marriage has run its course and realise they must start out on a new romantic journey. It won’t make waves like One Day, but then, no writer should expect that kind of success more than once in a lifetime."

Matt Cain, writing in The Independent, refused to be critical: "a reviewer is only ever respected if he demolishes someone's work and even if he loves it can often feel duty-bound to toss in at least one criticism. But I'm not going to do this as I think Us is a perfect book. And I don't care if that means I've failed as a reviewer, because I've already won as a reader."

Jay McInerney in The New York Times had some reservations, writing: "Nicholls is a deft craftsman, a skilled storyteller and a keen observer of contemporary mores. It would be interesting to see him challenge himself to dig deeper under the surface of contemporary life. Us will probably be welcomed by his legions of fans, though it’s unlikely to surprise or challenge or unsettle them in any way — or to provoke them to look at each other with a wild surmise."
