= Josefina Gabrielle =

British actress (born 1963)

- Born: Josefina Gabrielle Holmes; October 1963 (age 63); London, England
- Occupations: Actress, ballet dancer
- Years active: 1999–present
- Spouse: Michael Praed (2014–present)

Josefina Gabrielle Holmes, professionally known as Josefina Gabrielle (born October 1963), is a British actress and ballet dancer, best known for her performances in West End musicals and plays.

== Theatrical career ==
Gabrielle was born in London in October 1963 to a Spanish father and an English mother. She trained at the Arts Educational Schools, London and began her professional career dancing with the National Ballet of Portugal. Upon returning to Britain, she started a career in musical theatre, and has since appeared in numerous musical productions, in the West End and on Broadway.

In 1992, she was part of the ensemble in Nicholas Hytner's acclaimed revival of Rodgers and Hammerstein's Carousel. This production opened at the Royal National Theatre and transferred in 1993 to the Shaftesbury Theatre. Her other early roles include Iris in Fame at the Cambridge Theatre, Maggie in A Chorus Line at the Derby Playhouse and Cassie in a touring production of the same show, and Jenna in The Goodbye Girl at the Noël Coward Theatre.

She continued her association with Rodgers and Hammerstein in 1998 when she was chosen by director Trevor Nunn to star as Laurey Williams in his new production of Oklahoma! opposite Hugh Jackman which was staged at the National Theatre. It later transferred to the Lyceum Theatre in the West End. For her performance in Oklahoma!, she received her first Olivier Award nomination for Best Actress in a Musical. Her "Dream Ballet" was choreographed by Susan Stroman. When this revival transferred to Broadway in 2002, Gabrielle travelled with the show and made her Broadway debut with the new company.

Gabrielle's other roles include Dot/Maria in Sunday in the Park With George at the Leicester Haymarket, Roxie Hart in Chicago at the Adelphi and Cambridge theatres, Alexandra Spofford in The Witches of Eastwick at the Prince of Wales Theatre, Cassie in A Chorus Line at Sheffield's Crucible Theatre, Kathy Selden in Singin' in the Rain at the Leicester Haymarket and Sadler's Wells theatres, Irene Molloy in the Open Air Theatre, Regent's Park production of Hello, Dolly!

In Sweet Charity, which played first at the Menier Chocolate Factory and transferred to the Theatre Royal, Haymarket in the West End, Gabrielle played the roles of Nickie and Ursula, and received another Olivier Award nomination for her performance. Later in 2010, she played Lady Jacqui in the Crucible Theatre's, Sheffield production of Me and My Girl.

In 2012, she toured the UK in the role of Anna Leonowens in a production of Rodgers and Hammerstein's The King and I, her third musical by this duo. Later that year, she returned to the Menier Chocolate Factory to play the role of Gussie Carnegie in Maria Friedman's much acclaimed production of Stephen Sondheim's musical Merrily We Roll Along, which had its West End transfer to the Harold Pinter Theatre in 2013 and earned Gabrielle her third Olivier Award nomination for her performance. In May 2014, she joined the new cast of Charlie and the Chocolate Factory the Musical at the Theatre Royal, Drury Lane, as Mrs. Teavee. In August and September 2017, she took the lead role of Desirée in Sondheim's A Little Night Music at the Watermill Theatre, Newbury.

In 2018, she returned to Chicago when the production returned to the West End, to the Phoenix, this time playing the role of Velma Kelly. She played opposite the Roxie Harts of Sarah Soetart, Alexandra Burke and Caroline Flack. In 2020, she played Madame Thenardier in Les Misérables when the ‘new’ version re-opened the refurbished Queen's Theatre under its new name of the Sondheim Theatre. She was performing this role as of October 2022.

=== Theatrical roles ===
Year	Show	Role	Theatre	Notes	Ref
1992	Carousel	Ensemble	Royal National Theatre		
1993	Carousel	Ensemble	Shaftesbury Theatre		
1998	Oklahoma!	Laurey Williams	National Theatre		
1998	Oklahoma!	Laurey Williams	Lyceum Theatre		
2010	Me and My Girl	Lady Jacqui	Crucible Theatre'		
2012	The King and I	Anna Leonowens	Touring		
2012	Merrily We Roll Along	Gussie Carnegie	Menier Chocolate Factory		
2013	Merrily We Roll Along	Gussie Carnegie	Harold Pinter Theatre		
2014-2015	Charlie and the Chocolate Factory	Mrs. Teavee	Theatre Royal, Drury Lane		
2017	A Little Night Music	Desirée	Watermill Theatre, Newbury		
2018	Chicago	Velma Kelly	Phoenix Theatre		
2020-2022	Les Misérables	Madame Thenardier	Sondheim Theatre		
2023	42nd Street	Maggie Jones	Touring		
2023	Farewell Mister Haffmann	Suzanne	Theatre Royal, Bath		
2024	The Baker's Wife	Denise	Menier Chocolate Factory		
2026	One Day	Alison Mayhew	Royal Lyceum Theatre		

== Dramatic work ==
Gabrielle has appeared in various straight plays and comedies, including Noël Coward's Tonight at 8.30, a series of one act plays ( Red Peppers, The Astonished Heart, Family Album, Hands Across the Sea, Fumed Oak and Shadow Play ) at Minerva Theatre, Chichester opposite Alexander Hanson in 2006, The 39 Steps at the Criterion Theatre in 2007/08, The Murder Game at the King's Head Theatre in 2009, Park Avenue Cat at the Arts Theatre in 2011 and Ray Cooney's Two into One at the Menier Chocolate Factory in 2014. In 2017, she took over the role of Mavis in Maria Friedman's revival of Richard Harris' play Stepping Out at the Vaudeville Theatre.

== Film and television ==
Gabrielle's on screen credits include:

- Miranda as a dance teacher
- Doctors
- Heartbeat as Debbie Bellamy
- Born and Bred as Jacqueline Williamson
- Auf Wiedersehen, Pet as Ofelia
- Sunburn as Receptionist
- Oklahoma! as Laurey
- The 56th Annual Tony Awards as herself
- The Rosie O'Donnell Show as herself

== Recordings ==
She can be heard on the London cast recordings of Oklahoma!, The Goodbye Girl, Fame and Carousel.

== Awards and nominations ==
Year	Award	Category	Work	Result
1999	Laurence Olivier Awards	Best Actress in a Musical	Oklahoma!	Nominated
2001-2002	Outer Critics Circle Award		Oklahoma!	Nominated
2002	Astaire Awards	Best Female Dancer	Oklahoma!	Nominated
2011	Clarence Derwent Awards	Best Female in a Supporting Role	Sweet Charity	Won
2011	Laurence Olivier Awards	Best Performance in a Supporting Role in a Musical	Sweet Charity	Nominated
2012	Manchester Theatre Awards	Best Actress in a Visiting Production	King and I	Nominated
2014	Laurence Olivier Awards	Best Performance in a Supporting Role in a Musical	Merrily We Roll Along	Nominated
