= Oliver Darley =

- Genres: Pop, soul
- Occupation(s): Singer, actor
- Instrument: vocals

Oliver Darley is a singer and actor. After training at the Bristol Old Vic Theatre School, and performing with the Royal Shakespeare Company, his 2002 debut album as a singer was produced by Arif Mardin, and featured Aretha Franklin's acclaimed rhythm section, comprising Bernard Purdie, Cornell Dupree, and David "Fathead" Newman, with The Impressions performing on one track. Jools Holland also appears on the album. A track from the album, "Rescue Me", was used as the opening theme for the BBC TV series Rescue me.

His song "She's a Killer", co-written with Peter Cunnah, features in the 2002 film Whacked.

He was in the original West End cast (2004–05) of the Andrew Lloyd Webber/David Zippel musical The Woman in White, directed by Trevor Nunn.

He recently appeared as 'The Voice' in Dance 'til Dawn, alongside Vincent Simone and Flavia Cacace.

== Theatre ==
With the Royal Shakespeare Company

- 1992: The Alchemist
- 1992: Romeo & Juliet
- 1992: Antigone
- 1992: Columbus: The Discovery of Japan

With the New Shakespeare Company

- Hamlet
- A Midsummer Night's Dream
- The Card

West End

- The Woman in White

== Television ==
- The Bill (Thames)
- Shadows (Sky)
- 2000: The Sins (BBC)

== Discography ==
- 2002: Introducing Oliver Darley (East West Records)
- 2006: Sweet Sinner (Sony BMG)
- 2010: Still Crazy (Amber and Blue)
- 2014: Mindin' My Business (Amber and Blue)
- 2016: Simply Bowie (Amber and Blue)
