= Sweet Sorrow (novel) =

2019 novel by David Nicholls

- First edition cover
- Author: David Nicholls
- Cover artist: Nathan Burton
- Language: English
- Genre: Coming-of-age; Romance
- Published: 9 July 2019
- Media type: Print (hardcover, paperback)
- Pages: 405
- ISBN: 9781444715415
- Preceded by: Us
- Followed by: You Are Here

Sweet Sorrow is a 2019 coming-of-age novel by British writer David Nicholls. Narrated retrospectively by Charlie Lewis, it follows a summer in 1997 when, aged 16 and dealing with his parents' divorce, he joins an amateur production of Shakespeare's Romeo and Juliet after meeting Fran Fisher.

The novel was first published in Great Britain in 2019 by Hodder & Stoughton.

== Plot ==
In 1997, 16-year-old Charlie Lewis is struggling with the aftermath of his parents' divorce. He lives with his depressed, unemployed, and alcoholic father and feels directionless and uncertain about his future, having failed his GCSEs and facing a long, empty summer before the results come out.

One day, while reading next to an old mansion on a hill, Charlie meets Fran Fisher, a girl from a more affluent background who attends a nearby private school. Fran is involved in a local amateur theatre production of Shakespeare's Romeo and Juliet, and Charlie, smitten with her, joins the production as Benvolio to spend more time with her, despite his lack of acting experience.

As Charlie becomes more immersed in the theatre production, his relationship with Fran deepens, and the two fall in love. To obtain funds, Charlie works part-time at a petrol station, where he ultimately resorts to stealing scratchcards for their monetary prizes. His scheme is detected on the night after he loses his virginity to Fran. Humiliated, Charlie quits the play, but is ultimately persuaded by the other cast members to return.

Fran and Charlie ultimately break up after five months. Fran goes to college, while Charlie remains at home, saying that he needs to look after his depressed father, and takes a job working at an airport lounge.

Six years later, Charlie is convinced to leave his hometown, retake his failed exams, and apply to colleges. He becomes a visual effects artist and meets Niamh, who later becomes his fiancée. Just weeks before his wedding to Niamh, a 38-year-old Charlie attends a reunion of the old theatre company, where he briefly reconnects with Fran. He returns home and reflects on the summer and his subsequent life.

== Themes ==
Alex Preston of The Guardian described the novel as a love story about growing up and leaving home, and Charlie as falling for Shakespeare as well as Fran. Olivia Fricot of Booktopia similarly described it as both a story of first love and an "ode to the formative powers of art". Holly Williams of The Independent noted that Shakespeare changes Charlie's life without wholly transforming it, and identified the class difference between Charlie and Fran as a source of his insecurity.

Bethanne Patrick of The Washington Post described the theatre production as the backdrop to a story about first love and its echoes later in life. Alfred Hickling of The Guardian noted that Charlie's retrospective narration establishes that his relationship with Fran will not last, while Nicholls avoids becoming overly sentimental about teenage infatuation.

== Critical reception ==
Preston described Sweet Sorrow as a nostalgic love story that remains moving without becoming sentimental, and praised Nicholls's humour. Hickling called it a "funny, affectionate exploration of first love", although he considered 400 pages excessive for the story of a single summer and found that the scenes involving Charlie's father tended to drag.

Williams described Nicholls's writing as "an ideal blend of the gently humorous and utterly heartfelt", and praised his depiction of both the pleasures and difficulties of adolescence. She also considered the adult Charlie's present-day life too briefly developed. Patrick praised Nicholls's understanding of formative experiences and his depiction of first love as something reconsidered from the perspective of adulthood. Fricot described the relationship between Charlie and Fran as sincere and imperfect, and praised Nicholls's treatment of adolescent infatuation and self-consciousness.
