= Freya Catrin Smith =

British writer

Freya Catrin Smith is a UK-based musical theatre composer, lyricist and book writer.

== Career ==
She won the 2023 Fred Ebb Award, and the Chamber Musical Prize.

Smith created the musicals: Ride, The Limit, and a song cycle called Part A (with collaborator Jack Williams). She has also written additional lyrics for the upcoming musical One Day.

Ride is a musical based on the life story of Annie Londonderry, the first woman to cycle around the world. It was performed at the Charing Cross Theatre in September 2022, the Southwark Playhouse in August 2023, and the Old Globe Theatre in March 2024.

Smith has also been a finalist for the Cameron Mackintosh Composer Residency, the Stiles and Drewe Best New Song Prize, and the MTI Stiles + Drewe Mentorship Award.
