= One Day (TV series) =

- Release poster by Netflix
- Based on: One Day by David Nicholls
- Starring: Leo Woodall; Ambika Mod
- Composers: Anne Nikitin; Jessica Jones; Tim Morrish
- Country of origin: United Kingdom
- Original language: English
- No. of episodes: 14

Production
- Executive producers: Roanna Benn; David Nicholls; Jude Liknaitzky; Nicole Taylor
- Running time: 19–38 minutes
- Production companies: Drama Republic; Universal International Studios; Focus Features

Original release
- Network: Netflix
- Release: 8 February 2024

One Day is a British romantic drama limited series based on the 2009 novel by David Nicholls as well as the 2011 film adaptation. It follows the 14-year relationship of Emma Morley and Dexter Mayhew, who meet at a graduation ball after graduating from the University of Edinburgh, and stars Leo Woodall and Ambika Mod in the lead roles.

Premiering on 8 February 2024 on Netflix, it received critical acclaim and was the most-watched series globally during the week of 12 February, with 9.9 million views.

== Cast and characters ==
=== Main ===
- Leo Woodall as Dexter Mayhew
- Ambika Mod as Emma Morley

=== Recurring ===
- Eleanor Tomlinson as Sylvie
- Essie Davis as Alison Mayhew
- Tim McInnerny as Stephen Mayhew
- Jonny Weldon as Ian
- Brendan Quinn as Callum
- Billie Gadsdon as Jasmine
- Toby Stephens as Lionel Cope
- Joely Richardson as Helen Cope
- Amber Grappy as Tilly
- Adam Loxley as Graham
- Tim Preston as Gary
- John Macmillan as Aaron
- Rebekah Murrell as Suki
- Jodie Price as Sonya
- Sophie Wolff as Tara
- Joseph Pharoah as Andy
- Will Hislop as Toby
- Meghan Treadway as Kate
- Ella-Rae Smith as Naomi
- Mathilde Thomine Storm as Tove
- Sam Swan as Damian
- Beth Lindsey as Sarah
- Mark Rowley as Mr. Godalming
- Anthony Calf as Sid
- Edouard Chény as Jean-Pierre
- Emily Eaton-Plowright as Candy
- Ike Bennet as Kwame
- John Tueart as Andrew
- Hannah van Vliet as Lotte
- Julia Frith as Fiona

== Episodes ==
| No. | Title | Directed by | Written by | Original release date |
|---|---|---|---|---|
| 1 | "Episode 1" | Molly Manners | Nicole Taylor | 8 February 2024 |
On 15 July 1988 (St Swithin's Day), Emma Morley and Dexter Mayhew meet at a graduation ball after finishing their undergraduate studies at the University of Edinburgh. Emma is a working-class girl from Leeds while Dexter comes from a privileged family in London, and they have little in common. Nonetheless, they are interested in each other and spend a platonic night together in Emma's flat, talking about their future plans after university. In the morning, Dexter is in a hurry to meet his parents, but then chooses to spend some more time with Emma on Arthur's Seat (pretending to Emma that he has left a message for his parents). As they leave, Dexter asks Emma to have a drink with him at his flat. They exchange a look and start to run, but Dexter's parents are there. Emma takes her leave, but Dexter runs after her and asks for her number to keep in contact.
| 2 | "Episode 2" | Molly Manners | Bijan Sheibani; Nicole Taylor | 8 February 2024 |
A year has passed and Emma is indecisive whether she should stay with her stage director in a travelling theatre troupe or move back to Leeds with her family. She decides to move in with her best friend Tilly in London. Broke and miserable, she ends up working in a Mexican restaurant where she meets Ian—a self-proclaimed comedian. Dexter spends a year in Italy. His mother regularly asks about his future plans, and is dismissive when he mentions being a photographer. Dexter suspects his mother is ill. Dexter and Emma keep up their friendship through letters and postcards.
| 3 | "Episode 3" | Molly Manners | Nicole Taylor | 8 February 2024 |
In 1990, Dexter begins his career as a television presenter on a raucous late-night show while Emma begins to feel increasingly uneasy with her job at the restaurant. Dexter comes to the restaurant to see her, bringing his current girlfriend. After Emma's shift ends, Ian asks whether she would come to see one of his gigs; Emma tells him that she already has plans (with Dexter). Emma then spends the evening with Dexter on Primrose Hill where they chat about their friendships. While his mother's health is weighing on him, he tells Emma that she gives up on herself and reminds her why she's "one in a million".
| 4 | "Episode 4" | Kate Hewitt | Nicole Taylor | 8 February 2024 |
In 1991, as their friendship gets stronger, Emma and Dexter decide to take a holiday to Greece where they spend a week eating and swimming in the sea. Emma gives Dexter a set of rules they cannot break, one of which is not sleeping together. However, they are forced to break this rule as their room has only a double bed. During dinner, they play a game in which they tell each other secrets the other doesn't know. Dexter says he kissed a guy while Emma tells him that she used to have a massive crush on him when they first met in Edinburgh. Dexter brushes it off and tells her that it needs to be a secret, saying he already knew because Tilly told him. He also says that he used to have a crush on her too, but then says he "fancies everyone" and that he isn't looking for anything serious. They go skinny dipping in the Aegean where Dexter attempts to kiss her, and suggests a no-strings-attached, casual situation, which Emma rebuffs by dunking him under the water. Upset, Emma then gets out of the water.
| 5 | "Episode 5" | Kate Hewitt | Anna Jordan; Vinay Patel | 8 February 2024 |
In 1992, Dexter is invited to have lunch with his parents. Because of an extreme hangover, he arrives hours late and is still intoxicated. He brings his mother a gift from Emma. When his mother asks about their relationship, Dexter replies that they are just friends. She then confronts him on how unimpressed she is with his lifestyle and tells him that he has not reached his potential. He carries his ill mother up to her bedroom and sleeps through supper which he had promised to attend. His father, having hidden his car keys, drives him to Radley station and tells him to never come back to the house under the influence. Emma has her own small place and is dating Ian who tells her that Dexter has always taken her for granted. Dexter, upset over his visit to his parents, phones Emma from a public telephone at the station and, crying, says he needs her; he then remembers that Emma is on a date with Ian.
| 6 | "Episode 6" | Kate Hewitt | Bijan Sheibani | 8 February 2024 |
In 1993, Emma's role as a teacher is praised by many, including the school headmaster who seems to have taken a special interest in her. Before a drama performance she comforts her pupil Sonya, who is scared and hesitant about her ability to sing and dance in the show. Sonya recovers from her stage fright and Emma, who had been nervous about the show, receives a standing ovation for her effort. Dexter is adored by many of his fans, primarily girls, and has earned the moniker "sexy Dexy". However, he has also been panned by critics for his apparent hostility and called "the most annoying man on telly", which upsets him. Afraid and anxious, Dexter intoxicates himself before the live show and puts more alcohol in an empty water bottle to drink on stage. His bottle gets mixed up with his co-host Suki's, and the show turns into a disaster when Suki drinks the alcohol, starts coughing, and Dexter freezes on camera.
| 7 | "Episode 7" | John Hardwick | Nicole Taylor | 8 February 2024 |
The following year, Dexter is self-absorbed with his fame and wealth. Emma is unhappy with her writing career. She meets Dexter for dinner in a fancy restaurant selected by Dexter. Each time she tries to tell Dexter about her situation, he pays her little attention, frequently leaving the table to get high on cocaine and flirt with the cigarette girl. He gets progressively more cruel toward Emma, finally saying that "teaching is for those who can't do anything else". Emma storms out of the restaurant. Dexter follows her and attempts to make up for the situation, but Emma tells him that he used to make her feel good about herself and now makes her feel like "shit". She tells Dexter they are no longer friends and goes home to be comforted by Ian.
| 8 | "Episode 8" | John Hardwick | Anna Jordan | 8 February 2024 |
On the last day of term in 1995, Emma has sex with the school headmaster who gives her a Nokia mobile phone to keep in touch with him. Arriving home, she is confronted by Ian who is in her flat even though they broke up months ago. He accuses her of cheating with Dexter. Emma explains that she has not been in touch with Dexter for a year. She is outraged when she finds that Ian has been through her diaries and found pictures of her with Dexter. They argue but finally talk more calmly. Ian then asks Emma if she actually loved Dexter, and she replies that she used to love him years ago in Edinburgh. He tells her to publish her diary stories as he thinks they are good. After Ian leaves, Emma looks at her new phone and reminisces about Dexter, as he had promised to buy her dinner when she got a mobile phone. She then goes and buys cigarettes and alcohol. On the way home, she runs into her former student Sonya who tells Emma that she got into the University of Edinburgh to study English. Emma goes home, refrains from drinking the liquor she bought, and starts to write a novel based on the diaries.
| 9 | "Episode 9" | John Hardwick | Bijan Sheibani | 8 February 2024 |
In 1996, Dexter has met a woman named Sylvie and is invited to her house to meet her family. The family are clearly unimpressed by his career and television shows. They also try to get Dexter to drink, but he is now part of Alcoholics Anonymous, and resists their pushing. Dexter's agent calls him to break the news that he will not be contracted for a second season of his video-game-review show Game On!. After dinner, the family play a game that involves hitting each other with a rolled-up newspaper, which they find hilarious. They pressure him to take a turn that ends in him accidentally almost breaking Sylvie's nose. The family are furious with him. Dexter asks Sylvie to forgive him which she does but when he attempts to sleep, he has a flashback to Emma's flat in Edinburgh when they had their first platonic night together. Dexter begins laughing and wishes that he could tell Emma about his day. He tells Sylvie he loves her.
| 10 | "Episode 10" | Luke Snellin | Nicole Taylor | 8 February 2024 |
In 1997, Emma and Dexter attend the wedding of Tilly to Graham. Sitting with Sylvie, Dexter keeps looking at the back of the church, searching for Emma. She arrives with friends and sits at the back of the church but she and Dexter see each other. At the reception, Dexter is approached by his old flatmate Callum (now a multimillionaire) who offers him a job. Feeling humiliated, Dexter confronts Callum about the ethics of giving a job to a friend while Sylvie attempts to persuade him to take it. Emma makes a toast to the newlyweds and later, once the dancing has started, Dexter finds her and they reconnect while walking around a maze. Emma has been given a large enough advance from a publisher to write full time for a while. Dexter tells Emma that he is engaged and getting married soon because Sylvie is pregnant. Emma is shocked but regains her composure and says she is happy for him. She confesses that she has missed him every day, which he reciprocates. They kiss and promise to remain "best friends".
| 11 | "Episode 11" | Luke Snellin | Nicole Taylor | 8 February 2024 |
In 1998, Emma and Dexter frequently call each other to catch up with their lives. Dexter (now a father) is working in one of Callum's coffee shops. At home, Sylvie is unhappy and exhausted as the baby Jasmine doesn't sleep and the house renovations are stressful. Dexter is bothered by Sylvie's parents' nosiness about his career plans and tells Sylvie to not keep telling her parents. Sylvie then leaves for a hen party, something she's been looking forward to for weeks. While drinking a bottle of wine, Dexter takes care of Jasmine and discovers an old mixtape he and Emma used to listen to. He calls her asking her to come over but she is with Tilly and Graham. Later, Sylvie calls Dexter to check in. They have a conversation in which Dexter promises her that he's trying to figure everything out. However, Sylvie is secretly having an affair with Callum, having lied to her husband about the party.
| 12 | "Episode 12" | Luke Snellin | Nicole Taylor | 8 February 2024 |
In 1999, Dexter files for divorce from Sylvie and goes from London to Paris to see Emma, where she's doing research for her second book. Emma meets him at Gare du Nord and the two talk in a café. They then go to Emma's flat where Dexter attempts to kiss her. Emma rebuffs him, saying that she is now seeing a Frenchman named Jean-Pierre. Dexter gets defensive and questions why she never told him about it, explaining that he came to Paris to talk about the sex they had right after he and Sylvie got divorced. Emma tells him that not everything that happened was because of him and that she doesn't need his permission to be seeing someone new. In the middle of their argument, Jean-Pierre arrives as Emma has arranged a dinner for the three of them. A heartbroken Dexter bails out on dinner plan with the excuse that he picked up tonsillitis. Emma eventually comes back to the flat where they are intimate again. Dexter then promises Emma that he's never going to hurt her and tells her that he knows she could not get him out of her head.
| 13 | "Episode 13" | Luke Snellin | David Nicholls | 8 February 2024 |
In 2000, Emma and Dexter are a couple. Dexter wants a new start and persuades his father to allow him to use the money his mother had left him to turn an old fish market into a café. Emma tells Dexter's father that she has 100% confidence in the venture. By 2001, Dexter and Emma are planning their wedding and Emma's fourth novel is ready to be published. The two spend time with Jasmine, and Emma tells Dexter that she is ready for a baby, which Dexter has been waiting for her to say. A year later, Emma has not become pregnant. After an argument, Dexter tries to comfort her with talk about a house they might buy. Emma spends the day writing and then goes for a swim. She leaves Dexter a message apologising for snapping at him, telling him that she loves him and that she'll be five minutes late to their appointment to view the house. It is a rainy St Swithin's Day and on the way to meet Dexter, Emma is knocked off her bicycle by a reckless driver and killed, exactly 14 years after their first encounter in Edinburgh.
| 14 | "Episode 14" | Molly Manners | Nicole Taylor | 8 February 2024 |
In the aftermath of Emma's death, Dexter is broken and has revisited his old self-destructive behaviour, getting drunk and high on cocaine. After getting beaten up earlier, Dexter passes out at Sylvie's. His father takes him home where he sobs uncontrollably in his childhood bed. In 2004, Tilly, Graham, Sylvie, Ian and his father visit and attempt to comfort him. Ian, now happily married with children and lives in Taunton, tells Dexter how happy he made Emma. After everyone leaves, Dexter sits in the room where he stores Emma's belongings and starts imagining her beside him. Ghost Emma tells him that he won't always feel like this as tears roll down his face. Three years later, Dexter, Jasmine and his father go to Edinburgh where he visits the places he and Emma went on their first day. Outside her old apartment, he reminisces about their first night together. Jasmine asks Dexter if they can climb Arthur's Seat, and he trails behind her the same way he did Emma. Finally, he reminisces about their lives and imagines if he had kissed Emma on the steps after he had asked her for her number 19 years ago.

== Production ==
=== Development ===
Netflix ordered a new One Day adaptation in November 2021 from Drama Republic. The writers' room was led by Nicole Taylor and consists of Anna Jordan, Vinay Patel, and Bijan Sheibani. Executive producers included Nicholls and Taylor as well as Roanna Benn and Jude Liknaitzky. Molly Manners was attached to direct the series.

Actress Ambika Mod said in November 2022 that the series would cover more of the novel than the 2011 film adaptation.

=== Casting ===
In June 2022, it was announced Ambika Mod and Leo Woodall would star as the leads Emma and Dexter respectively. Eleanor Tomlinson and Essie Davis joined the cast as Sylvie and Alison respectively, as announced in July and October.

=== Filming ===
Principal photography began in London on 4 July 2022 before moving to Edinburgh on 18 July. Filming took place on location at the University of Edinburgh's Old College, as well as the city centre, West End, and Old Town.

=== Music ===
Original music was composed by Anne Nikitin, along with Tim Morrish and Jessica Jones of the musical duo Vanbur.

=== Dedication ===
At the end of the series, a dedication is shown: "In loving memory of Justin Eely". Eely was a senior online editor, also known as a finishing editor, who had worked on the entire series before dying unexpectedly. This role is "a largely technical role designed to ensure that a project is transmission-ready". He had a career stretching back to 1996, worked on many successful shows, including Killing Eve, Good Omens, and The Crown as well as Wes Anderson's latest film Asteroid City.

== Release ==
One Day premiered on 8 February 2024 on Netflix as a limited-run series.

== Reception ==
The series received critical acclaim and was the most-watched series globally during the week of 12 February 2024, with 9.9 million views.

The review aggregator website Rotten Tomatoes reported a 92% approval rating based on 49 critic reviews, with an average rating of 8/10. The website's critics consensus reads, "Chronicling the passage of time with well-observed sweep, One Day is by turns giddy and somber but always swooningly romantic". Metacritic, which uses a weighted average, assigned a score of 76 out of 100 based on 23 critics, indicating "generally favorable reviews". Anita Singh of the Telegraph awarded the series four stars out of five, writing "David Nicholls's bestselling novel has been skilfully turned into an easily digestible drama series for the Netflix age."

It was a breakthrough for the careers of leads Ambika Mod and Leo Woodall.

=== Accolades ===
| Award | Date of ceremony | Category | Nominee(s) | Result | Ref. |
|---|---|---|---|---|---|
| Gotham TV Awards | 4 June 2024 | Outstanding Performance in a Limited Series | Ambika Mod | Nominated | |
