= Miracle Chance =

English actress and singer (born 1992)

- Born: Miracle So Chance; 19 October 1992 (age 34)
- Education: Guildford School of Acting
- Years active: 2014–present
- Spouse: Jonathan Kogan (m. 2026)
- Website: www.miraclechance.co.uk

Miracle So Chance (born 19 October 1992) is an English actress, singer and composer. She is best known for her work in musical theatre.

== Early life ==
Chance grew up in Scorriton, a village near Buckfastleigh, Devon. She is the daughter of actor and artist Clem So, who was born in Liverpool to Chinese parents. Chance attended Park School and King Edward VI Community College. She took classes at the Totnes School of Dance from the age of nine. After spending a gap year at Idyllwild Arts Academy in California, Chance went on to graduate from the Guildford School of Acting in Surrey.

== Career ==
After graduating from drama school, Chance made her professional stage debut on the UK and Australia tour of Angelina Ballerina – the Mousical. She also took part in a number of workshops, including Everybody's Talking About Jamie. This was followed by roles in the Loserville revival at the Union Theatre, London, the UK tours of Footloose and The Wedding Singer as Urleen and understudying Julia respectively. In 2018, Chance played Cynthia in Priscilla, Queen of the Desert at the Queen's Theatre, Hornchurch and Columbia on the UK tour of The Rocky Horror Show.

During drama school, Chance met and befriended Blythe Jandoo and Kat Kleeve, with whom she formed a girl group called Maid. In 2019, Maid were one of six acts in contention to represent the United Kingdom at the Eurovision Song Contest, appearing in the BBC's Eurovision: You Decide. The group later rebranded to Arroh. Chance has also performed with the 1920s-themed vocal trio Wild Tonics and the rock band The Fratellis.

Chance was cast as Christine Canigula in the Off-West End production of Be More Chill in early 2020 before the show closed due to the COVID-19 pandemic. Chance reprised her role when Be More Chill re-opened and moved to the Shaftesbury Theatre in 2021, marking Chance's West End debut. That same year, Chance co-wrote the mini-musical Sitting Pretty with Lizzy Connolly, which ran at the Brighton Fringe Festival, and returned to the Queen's Theatre, Hornchurch for The Witchfinder's Sister, an adaptation of the novel by Beth Underdown. The following year, she played Ariel in the parody Unfortunate: The Untold Story of Ursula The Sea Witch at Edinburgh Fringe Festival and on tour.

In 2023, Chance took over the role of Veronica Sawyer in Heathers: The Musical at the Other Palace and featured in the original cast of the stage musical adaptation of Roald Dahl's The Witches at the National Theatre. In 2024, she originated the role of Lucy in the new musical adaptation Starter for Ten at Bristol Old Vic and played Brianna in the London production of the Australian musical Fangirls at the Lyric Theatre.

== Personal life ==
In February 2025, Chance announced her engagement to comedian and musician Jonathan Kogan. The couple married at Scorrier House in May 2026.

== Works ==
=== Stage ===
Year	Title	Role	Notes
2014	Angelina Ballerina – the Mousical	Viki	UK and Australia tour
2015	Loserville	Susie Alpine	Union Theatre, London
2016	Footloose	Urleen	UK tour
2017	The Wedding Singer	Julia (understudy)	UK tour
2017	The Christmasaurus Live	Snozzletrump / Ensemble	Hammersmith Apollo
2018	Priscilla, Queen of the Desert	Cynthia	Queen's Theatre, Hornchurch
2018–2019	The Rocky Horror Show	Columbia	UK tour
2020, 2021	Be More Chill	Christine Canigula	The Other Palace / Shaftesbury Theatre, London
2021	Sitting Pretty		Composer; Brighton Fringe Festival
2021	The Witchfinder's Sister	Grace	Queen's Theatre, Hornchurch
2022	Unfortunate: The Untold Story of Ursula The Sea Witch	Ariel	Edinburgh Fringe Festival / UK tour
2023	Heathers: The Musical	Veronica Sawyer	The Other Palace, London
2023	The Witches	Carol / Denise	National Theatre, London
2024	Starter for Ten	Lucy	Bristol Old Vic
2024	Fangirls	Brianna & Others	Lyric Theatre, Hammersmith
2025	Showstopper! The Improvised Musical		Bristol Old Vic
2026	One Day	Tilly	Royal Lyceum Theatre

=== Video games ===
Year	Title	Role	Notes	Ref.
2026	Wuthering Waves	Suoming		
