= You Are Here (novel) =

2024 novel by David Nicholls

- First edition cover
- Author: David Nicholls
- Language: English
- Genre: Romance
- Published: 23 April 2024
- Publisher: Sceptre
- Pages: 368
- ISBN: 9781444715446

You Are Here is a 2024 romance novel by British writer David Nicholls, published by Sceptre on 23 April 2024. It follows Marnie Walsh and Michael Bradshaw, who meet on a long-distance walk across northern England organised by their mutual friend Cleo.

The novel deals with loneliness, solitude and love in middle age. It won the Fiction category of the 2024 Books Are My Bag Readers' Awards. In July 2026, the BBC and Starz announced an eight-part television adaptation written by Nicholls and directed by Lenny Abrahamson, with Claire Foy and Matthew Macfadyen in the lead roles.

== Plot ==
Route taken in the novel

The novel alternates between the perspectives of Marnie Walsh, a 38-year-old divorced copy editor from London, and Michael Bradshaw, a 42-year-old geography teacher from York who is separated from his wife Natasha. Michael plans to walk the Coast to Coast route across northern England. Their mutual friend Cleo turns the first part of the walk into a group trip and invites Marnie along with several others.

Marnie is initially interested in another member of the group, Conrad. After the other walkers drop out, Marnie and Michael continue together, starting from the Irish Sea and making their way across the Lake District, the Yorkshire Dales and the North York Moors. Although Marnie had planned to take part for only the first three days, she remains on the trail beyond her original departure point.

During the journey, Marnie and Michael develop romantic feelings for each other and kiss. They stop short of having sex when a B&B landlady enforces a "no guests after 10 pm" rule. As Marnie considers continuing the walk, she discovers that Michael is expecting to meet Natasha and that he is still in love with her. Hurt, Marnie returns to London. When Natasha meets Michael, she reveals that she is pregnant by her new partner.

Months later, Michael arranges a school trip to London, where he and Marnie meet in Hyde Park. He apologises and tells her that he loves her. Michael, who did not finish the coast-to-coast walk, asks Marnie to return with him to complete its final two days. They kiss, and Marnie agrees to consider the invitation.

== Themes ==
Nicholls described loneliness and solitude as central concerns of You Are Here. He said that he did not want being alone to be presented simply as a condition that Marnie and Michael had to escape, since both characters also find satisfaction in their own company. He described the novel as concerning love at a different stage of life from his earlier work, and said that he was interested in how love changes according to age and circumstance.

Alex Preston of The Guardian discussed humour as part of Marnie's isolation. He wrote that she uses laughter to deflect moments of intimacy and described her sense of humour as both a form of protection and a barrier between her and other people. Preston contrasted this with Michael's greater seriousness and his awareness of the vulnerability involved in sincerity.

Preston also described the novel as containing two parallel seductions: the developing attraction between Marnie and Michael and Marnie's growing appreciation of the countryside. Lucy Atkins, also writing in The Guardian, described the story as following a familiar romantic structure of initial indifference, misdirected attraction, misunderstandings and obstacles, and characterised it as a "midlife redemption tale".

== Background ==
Nicholls said that criticism of the nostalgic settings of his earlier novels influenced his decision to set You Are Here in the present. He connected the novel to the experience of leaving the COVID-19 lockdowns, including the self-consciousness and awkwardness he associated with renewed social interaction and questions about friendship.

The novel is structured around the Coast to Coast Walk, the approximately 192-mile route devised by Alfred Wainwright from St Bees on the Irish Sea to Robin Hood's Bay on the North Sea. Nicholls walked the route himself in three sections, corresponding broadly to the Lakes, the Dales and the Moors. He said that he matched sections of the walk to stages in Marnie and Michael's relationship.

Nicholls later said that he could not imagine writing the novel without having walked the route. Some story events were planned beforehand, while others were prompted by places and experiences encountered during the walk; he cited the rain on Honister Pass and Angle Tarn as examples.

Although the route and landscape are real, Nicholls made the pubs, hotels and restaurants in the novel fictional and said that he had taken some small liberties with the route.

== Reception ==
Lucy Atkins of The Guardian described You Are Here as "a well-mapped romance". She praised Nicholls's ability to make "unpromising characters appealing" and his use of "pithy textural details" in depicting everyday life. Alex Preston, also writing in The Guardian, called it "a great comic novel" and "superb on the landscape".

Publishers Weekly found the story predictable but praised the terrain, the conditions encountered by Marnie and Michael and their dialogue.

The novel won the Fiction category of the 2024 Books Are My Bag Readers' Awards.

== Adaptation ==
In June 2024, Nicholls said that discussions about a screen adaptation had begun. He described the novel as more demanding to adapt than some of his other work because much of it takes place outdoors and contains long passages of dialogue, which he said could become visually uninteresting if transferred directly to the screen.

In July 2026, the BBC and Starz announced an eight-part television adaptation written by Nicholls and directed by Lenny Abrahamson, with Matthew Macfadyen as Michael and Claire Foy as Marnie. Nicholls said that the novel had been intended as "a close-up study of a relationship" set against a large landscape and that the adaptation had the same ambition.
