= Just like Home (2007 film) =

Just Like Home
- Theatrical release poster
- Directed by: Lone Scherfig
- Starring: Lars Kaalund; Bodil Jørgensen; Ann Eleonora Jørgensen
- Cinematography: Anthony Dod Mantle
- Production company: Zentropa
- Release date: 30 March 2007
- Running time: 97 minutes
- Country: Denmark
- Language: Danish

Just Like Home is a 2007 drama film directed by Lone Scherfig. It stars Lars Kaalund and Bodil Jørgensen.

== Cast ==
- Lars Kaalund as Apoteker
- Bodil Jørgensen as Myrtle
- Ann Eleonora Jørgensen as Margrethe
- Peter Gantzler as Erling
- Peter Hesse Overgaard as Lindy Steen

== Storyline ==
As the citizens of a secluded Danish town gradually lose their trust in one another, the sight of a naked man in the early morning hours sets off an unsettling wave of paranoia. Now, as a dedicated group of inhabitants set out to uncover the naked man's identity and re-establish their sense of community, they suddenly begin to realize that in assisting their neighbors they are simultaneously and inadvertently bettering themselves as well.
