= Sharon Rose =

English musical theatre actress

Sharon Rose is an English musical theatre actress. She is best known for playing the titular role in Sylvia, Eliza in Hamilton and Emma in the musical One Day.

== Early life and education ==
Rose's family is from Zimbabwe and her parents met in a band and were both Church Pastors, then Ministers, so music has always been an important part of her life, from a very young age. Despite not formally training, she stated in an interview that music was always her creative outlet "singing and playing together gave us a language of spontaneity in music that I feel helped me grow as a musician."

== Career ==
Rose made her West End debut in Beautiful: The Carole King Musical in 2016 as Little Eva and covering various roles as ensemble. The cast included Cassidy Janson as lead Carole King and Alan Morrissey as Gerry Goffin.

In 2019 Rose understudied the role of Diana Ross in Motown: The Musical at the Shaftesbury Theatre.

Rose joined the cast of Hamilton in London in 2021 as Eliza Schuyler.

In 2023 Rose played the titular role in the world premiere of the musical Sylvia at the Old Vic Theatre. The show celebrated the life of Emmeline Pankhurst's middle child, Sylvia Pankhurst and her role in the suffragette movement in the UK. Beverley Knight starred alongside Rose, as Emmeline. The two actresses reprised their rolesin 2026 for the UK tour of the show, ending its run at the Royal Albert Hall in London in November of the same year.

In 2025 Rose joined the cast of The Unlikely Pilgrimage of Harold Fry at Chichester Festival Theatre as Kate. The cast also included Jenna Russell as Maureen, Jack Wolfe as the Balladeer and Mark Addy as Harold Fry.

In July of the same year it was announced that Rose will play Emma in the musical One Day (from the book of the same title), alongside Jamie Muscato playing Dexter. The musical played the Royal Lyceum Theatre in Edinburgh from February until April 2026. In June it was announced that show will transfer to London in November 2026, with Muscato and Rose reprising their roles.

Year(s)	Production	Role	Location	Category	Ref.
2016	Beautiful: The Carole King Musical	Little Eva and Ensemble	Aldwych Theatre	West End	
2019	Motown: The Musical	Diana Ross (understudy)	Shaftesbury Theatre	West End	
	Caroline, or Change	Radio 2	UK Tour		
2020-2021	Hamilton	Standby, Eliza	Victoria Palace Theatre	West End	
2023	Sylvia	Sylvia Pankhurst	The Old Vic	Off West End	
2025	The Unlikely Pilgrimage of Harold Fry	Kate	Chichester Festival Theatre	Regional	
Feb-Apr 2026	One Day	Emma	Royal Lyceum Theatre	Regional	
2026	Sylvia	Sylvia Pankhurst	UK Tour and Royal Albert Hall	UK Tour	
2026	One Day	Emma	Garrick Theatre	West End	

=== Film and TV ===
Year	Title	Role	Notes
2020	Jingle Jangle : A Christmas Journey	Joanne	Movie
2024	Silent Witness	Dr Chloe Abbott	TV Series, 2 episodes
