= Starter for 10 (film) =

2006 film by Tom Vaughan

- US release poster
- Directed by: Tom Vaughan
- Written by: David Nicholls
- Based on: Starter for Ten by David Nicholls
- Produced by: Tom Hanks; Gary Goetzman; Pippa Harris
- Starring: James McAvoy; Alice Eve; Rebecca Hall; Charles Dance; Lindsay Duncan
- Cinematography: Ashley Rowe
- Edited by: Heather Persons
- Music by: Blake Neely
- Production companies: HBO Films; Playtone; BBC Films; Neal Street Productions
- Distributed by: Icon Film Distribution (United Kingdom); Picturehouse (United States)
- Release date: 10 November 2006
- Running time: 92 minutes
- Countries: United Kingdom; United States
- Language: English
- Budget: $5.7 million
- Box office: $1.7 million

Starter for 10 is a 2006 British romantic comedy-drama film directed by Tom Vaughan from a screenplay by David Nicholls, adapted from his 2003 novel Starter for Ten. The film stars James McAvoy as a university student who wins a place on a University Challenge quiz team. It premiered at the Toronto International Film Festival in September 2006, and was released in the UK and Ireland on 10 November 2006, and in Canada and the US on 23 February 2007.

The film's title is taken from the University Challenge catchphrase "Your starter for 10 ..." (i.e. the question given to both teams at the beginning of a round, which is worth ten points).

== Plot ==
In 1985, Brian Jackson is a first-year university student in English Literature and an information sponge. Since his working-class childhood in Southend-on-Sea, Brian has loved the TV quiz show University Challenge. After arriving at University of Bristol, Brian attends a party where he meets left-wing Jewish student Rebecca. Brian attempts to join the University Challenge team, but narrowly fails to secure a place when he helps another candidate, Drama student Alice, cheat on the qualifying test.

Brian tries to date Alice, despite her signals that she sees him as a friend. As term starts, Brian is invited to join the team after a member is knocked over by a bus. Patrick, a post-graduate student in mechanical engineering, has remained captain despite having led the team to successive losses on University Challenge. Lucy, an American student from Minneapolis majoring in medicine, completes the team. Brian impresses with his trivia knowledge and uses his time to get closer to Alice, eventually getting invited to her Suffolk cottage for New Year's Eve.

However, Brian embarrasses himself in front of her family by getting stoned while trying to impress Alice. He returns to Bristol for the rest of the vacation and meets Rebecca again. They are about to hookup, when he inadvertently calls Rebecca "Alice", offending her and ruining the moment. Spencer, his friend from Southend who runs a seaside arcade, makes a surprise visit to Brian's student accommodation and admits to being in legal trouble. Brian invites Spencer to a party before his court appearance.

During the party, Patrick insults Spencer's upbringing and belittles him. Spencer hits Patrick in the face and disrupts the event. Afterwards, Brian shares a drink with Rebecca and tries to apologise for his own behaviour. However, Rebecca still feels that Brian loves Alice. Rebecca encourages him to tell Alice how he feels. He takes her advice and arrives at Alice's flat to declare his love, but discovers Spencer there. Excited by his violent behaviour at the party, Alice had invited him back. Brian feels betrayed by them both, since Spencer knew how he felt about Alice.

Brian gets depressed and struggles with concentrating during University Challenge practices and his studies, threatening his university place. Patrick becomes frustrated with Brian, and as they arrive for their University Challenge match against Queen's College, Cambridge, berates him for his lack of focus. In response, Brian headbutts Patrick, but only succeeds in knocking himself unconscious. He is revived backstage by Rebecca, who has come to watch the show and gives him encouragement before he is escorted to the set.

En route, Brian is briefly left alone with an unsealed envelope containing the quiz questions. He reads one of the cards before putting it back in the envelope, and, inspired by the relative ease of a question about astronomy to which he already knew the answer, rejoins his team. The match starts off poorly, with nerves getting to Patrick as he fails to answer several questions. Brian slowly but surely saves them, getting into his swing as he answers question after question.

As the match is heating up and Brian's team has the momentum, quizmaster Bamber Gascoigne announces that the next question will be on astronomy and Brian inadvertently buzzes and gives the answer to the question he had previously seen before Gascoigne has even begun to read it. Realising that Brian has seen the cards, Gascoigne suspends the match and Brian's team is disqualified.

Brian returns home and falls into another depression, sleeping all day and ignoring calls. His mother tries to get him out of the house, but the person who finally reaches him is Spencer. He says that his court case has gone better than expected, with a suspended sentence, and that he is sorry for his behaviour and proud of Brian for chasing his dreams.

Inspired by his friend, Brian returns to Bristol and meets his tutor, promising that he is back for good. He then walks past Alice up to find Rebecca, who is taking part in a political demonstration. He asks her if she could ever forgive him for his mistakes, and if they can start again. She replies that he already knows the answer, and they kiss.

== Cast ==
- James McAvoy as Brian Jackson
- Alice Eve as Alice Harbinson
- Rebecca Hall as Rebecca Epstein
- Dominic Cooper as Spencer
- James Corden as Tone
- Simon Woods as Josh
- Catherine Tate as Julie Jackson
- Elaine Tan as Lucy Chang
- Charles Dance as Michael Harbinson
- Lindsay Duncan as Rose Harbinson
- Benedict Cumberbatch as Patrick Watts
- Mark Gatiss as Bamber Gascoigne
- James Gaddas as Mr Jackson
- John Henshaw as Des
- Guy Henry as Dr Morrison
- Ben Willbond as University Challenge Producer

== Production ==
Although set at Bristol University, the main quad and Gustave Tuck lecture theatre of University College London were used as sets. The University of Bristol Students Union building is in fact the university's School of Chemistry. The Granada TV studios are actually at the back of BBC Television Centre: the corridor (actually leading to the BBC multi-storey car park) was transformed for a day for the filming in 2005 with the addition of a Granada logo and pictures of past stars. The buildings at the end where a demonstration was held in which Brian tells Rebecca how much he likes her is the Queen Mary Court and King William Court at the University of Greenwich. Brian's home is shown as a slightly run-down seaside house, supposedly located in Westcliff-on-Sea. These scenes were actually filmed in the small village of Jaywick, near Clacton-on-Sea. Clacton Pier was used for the scenes set on the pier at Southend-on-Sea.

== Reception ==
On Rotten Tomatoes the film holds an approval rating 90% based on 77 reviews, with an average rating of 7/10. The site's critics consensus reads: "Starter For 10 is a spirited coming-of-age tale that remains charming and witty even as it veers into darker territory. The unique setting of a quiz show makes the film wittier than your average romantic comedy." Metacritic, which uses a weighted average, assigned the film a score of 69 out of 100, based on 25 critics, indicating "generally favorable" reviews.

Alice Eve later commented that there had been a "big debate" over whether the title of the film would be meaningful outside the UK, and that it "just didn't travel".

== Soundtrack ==
The Cure feature prominently in the film, with five of their songs used. The soundtrack also features music from The Smiths, The Psychedelic Furs, Buzzcocks, Yazoo, Motörhead, Echo & the Bunnymen, The Undertones, Tears for Fears, The Style Council and Kate Bush, amongst others. Several songs were released after the time in which the film is set (1985-1986).

== Stage adaptation ==
A musical based on both the novel and the film premiered at the Bristol Old Vic in February 2024.
