= Starter for Ten (novel) =

2003 novel by David Nicholls

- First edition
- Author: David Nicholls
- Language: English
- Subject: University Challenge
- Publication date: 2003
- Publication place: United Kingdom
- Pages: 480
- ISBN: 0-340-73487-6
- OCLC: 56442695
- Preceded by: None (debut novel)
- Followed by: The Understudy

Starter for Ten by David Nicholls is a novel first published in 2003 about the character Brian Jackson and his first year of university (1985–86), his attempts to get on the Granada Television quiz show University Challenge, and his tentative attempts at romance with Alice Harbinson, another member of the University Challenge team. The title is taken from an opening question to a round on the quiz show worth ten points, known as the teams' "starter for ten". Because this reference might be lost on American readers, it was originally released as A Question of Attraction when it was published in the United States.

It was adapted in 2006 as the film Starter for 10 and as a stage musical in 2024.

== Plot summary ==
The story, told in first-person narrative, is set in 1985 and chronicles the misadventures of student Brian Jackson in his first year at an unnamed university. A somewhat obsessive collector of general knowledge, Brian has been a fan since childhood of the television quiz show University Challenge which he used to watch with his late father, and on arriving at university, he seizes upon the opportunity to join its University Challenge team. He is initially unsuccessful, but is selected after one of the other team members is forced to drop out because of ill health. The TV show's catchphrase – "Your starter for 10" – gives the book its title.

Brian promptly falls for his glamorous teammate, Alice Harbinson, although the attraction is not mutual, and he may have more in common with a counterculturalist chum, Rebecca Epstein. Additionally, Brian finds himself caught between his new life, amongst the middle-class university set, and his old, with his working-class family and friends in the seaside town of Southend, Essex.

== Characters ==
- Brian Jackson — Narrator and central character of the story.
- Rebecca Epstein — The Marxist, Jewish law student with whom Brian has an intermittent relationship. She lives in the same residence hall as Alice and offers advice and encouragement to Brian.
- Alice Harbinson — The rich love interest of the narrator who has an unexplained scar on her lip. While wealthy, both she and her parents attempt to be socially conscious.
- Patrick — Tory Captain of the University Challenge team who provokes a fight with Spencer. He, like Brian, has a crush on Alice.

== Minor characters ==
- Tone and Spencer — Brian's working class friends. Tone gets a job as a salesman and, like Brian's father, is twisted by the need to make commission. Spencer runs into trouble while working and taking unemployment support, visits Brian, and causes a fight at the school.
- Mr. and Mrs. Harbinson — Alice's vegetarian and nudist parents, who barely tolerate Brian's visit to their palatial cottage in the country during the holidays.
- Lucy Chang — The fourth member of the team, a medical student, who serves as a force of moderation on the team. She is an international student from the United States.
- Des and Mum — Brian's Mother and her boyfriend, "Uncle" Des, whom she plans to marry.
- Neil — An actor who played Richard III and who went about on crutches to get into character for a part; he eventually becomes involved with Alice.
- Marcus and Josh — Brian's housemates who brew their own beer.

== Themes ==
=== Class ===
One of the major themes in Starter for Ten is social class. Brian Jackson is a working-class teenager from a one-parent family. His mother works in the chain-store Woolworths. On attending the prestigious University, Brian is aware that his state school background and working-class roots make him stand out. In an interview in The Guardian, the novel's writer David Nicholls expands on this theme.

== Adaptations ==
=== Film adaptation ===
The novel was adapted into a film in 2006 with screenplay by Nichols and directed by Tom Vaughan, starring James McAvoy as Brian.

=== Stage musical adaptation ===
The novel and film was adapted into a stage musical with music and lyrics by Hatty Carman and Tom Rasmussen, and book and lyrics by Emma Hall and Charlie Parham. It opened at the Bristol Old Vic in February 2024.
