= Anna Jordan =

English playwright

Anna Jordan (born 28 September 1979) is an English playwright, director, screenwriter and acting tutor. Her work has been presented at The Royal Court, Royal Exchange (Manchester) and internationally, with several productions of her plays in the United States and Germany, versions in Sweden, Ireland and productions planned in New Zealand, Canada and Turkey.

== Life and career ==
Jordan grew up in Brentford, West London, with a theatrical family.

Although both parents were actors, her journey after graduating from LAMDA drama school was not easy, so she began making and writing her own work. She then set up her own company, Without A Paddle, now a multiple award-winning theatre company and network.

=== Style ===
“There’s an obsession with discovering young, debut writers that carries an unrealistic burden of expectation,” Jordan says. “Even though winning the Bruntwood opened all sorts of doors, I’m hopefully a lot more level-headed about it than I would have been 10 years ago. 'Yen' isn’t my first play, but my seventh or eighth full-length piece.” She said that she does not "believe in writing plays without humour and hope."

Among her favorite writers are Jim Cartwright, Simon Stephens, David Eldridge and Sarah Kane. However, she states that her "first and greatest inspiration was John Sullivan’s 'Only Fools and Horses'."

=== Career ===
Jordan directed Tomorrow I’ll Be Happy by Jonathan Harvey for Lost Theatre as part of National Theatre Connections. The play ran from 27 February 2013 to 2 March 2013.

The British Theatre Guide reviewer of her play Chicken Shop wrote: "She is indubitably one of the hottest young talents around, so race to both the Park and 503 to catch her two fine plays while you have the chance." Chicken Shop won the London Fringe Production of the Year' Award for 2014.

Her play Freak premiered at the Assembly George Square Studios, Edinburgh, from 31 July 2014 to 25 August 2014, produced by Theatre 503 and Polly Ingham Productions. The British Theatre Guide reviewer wrote: "With two assured performances and a strong text, 'Freak' proves to be both lively and thoughtful and should prove very popular, especially with younger women." The play then ran at Theatre 503 in London from 2 September 2014 to 27 September 2014.

Her play Yen premiered at the Royal Exchange, Manchester in February 2015. The play revolves around two teen brothers who live alone, having been abandoned by their mother. Yen opened Off-Broadway in a MCC Theater production on 31 January 2017 at the Lucille Lortel Theatre. Directed by Trip Cullman, the cast features Justice Smith, Ari Graynor, and Lucas Hedges. In his review of the Off-Broadway production for The New York Times, Ben Brantley wrote: " 'Yen' is a thoughtful play, for sure, but too often you’re aware of the wheels churning behind it. And while everything clicks thematically (and symbolically), you may feel that the characters are being pushed into climactic positions by authorial hands...The production is most articulate at its least verbal, when the cast members give fractured physical life to their emotional confusion. " In 2023, Stratford East staged Jack and The Beanstalk pantomime.

She has also written for television, beginning with Succession. She later wrote episodes of Killing Eve, Becoming Elizabeth, One Day and Film Club. She will write on the upcoming second season of Sweetpea.

==== Acting tutor ====
Jordan is currently establishing a new, low-cost training programme for actors at the Hackney Showroom. She has taught and directed at Italia Conti Academy of Theatre Arts, Arts Ed, RADA and Identity, and has written for LAMDA and Central School of Speech and Drama. She coaches privately and runs the WAP Weekly Workout for Professional Actors.

== Plays ==
- Yen (2015), premiered at Royal Exchange, Manchester, directed by Ned Bennett.
- Chicken Shop (2014), premiered at Park Theatre, directed by Jemma Gross, 2014
- Freak (2014), Premiered at Assembly George Square Studios in the Edinburgh Festival Fringe and transferred to Theatre503 (London). Directed by Anna Jordan.
- Pop Music (2018), a Paines Plough and Birmingham Repertory Theatre production in association with Latitude Festival. Directed by James Grieve.

== Awards and honors ==
- Yen won the Bruntwood Prize for Playwriting in 2013
- Susan Smith Blackburn Prize 2015–16 Finalist for Yen
- West End Frame Fringe Production of the Year Award 2014 for Chicken Shop
- Overall Winner and Audience Award in the inaugural Off Cut Festival for her play Closer To God and Best New Writing in the Lost One Act Festival for Just For Fun – Totally Random
- The production of Tomorrow I'll Be Happy was one of ten plays out of 230 country-wide chosen to be performed at The National Theatre Shed.

== See also ==
- List of British playwrights since 1950
