= Bijan Sheibani =

British-Iranian theatre director

Bijan Sheibani (Persian: بیژن شیبانی) is a British theatre director and writer.

== Early life and education ==
Sheibani was born in Liverpool, and moved with his family to Hove when he was 7. He was schooled at St Andrew's C of E School in Hove and at Brighton College. He studied English literature at St Hugh's College, Oxford, and holds an MA in advanced theatre practice from the Central School of Speech and Drama.

== Career ==
Most recent theatre credits include The Brothers Size by Tarell Alvin McCraney, at the Young Vic Theatre, Inua Ellams' new play, Barber Shop Chronicles, at the National Theatre, and Circle Mirror Transformation by Annie Baker at Home Manchester. Earlier this year Barber Shop Chronicles toured to full houses in Australia and New Zealand after two sell-out runs at the National Theatre in 2017. It will tour the US in Autumn 2018.

Recent opera credits include Nothing by David Bruce at Glyndebourne Festival Opera and Danish National Opera (nominated for a 2017 Southbank Sky Arts Award for Best New Opera) and Tell Me The Truth About Love for Streetwise Opera.

Later this year Bijan will direct Clare Barron's award-winning new play Dance Nation for the Almeida Theatre (27 Aug-6 Oct).

Bijan has directed two short films, Groove is in the Heart, and Samira's Party, both of which were selected for the BFI London Film Festival and other international festivals, and he is currently developing a new short film with Film Four.

He was an associate director of the National Theatre from 2010 to 2015 under Nicholas Hytner and artistic director of Actors Touring Company (ATC) from 2007 to 2011. He won the James Menzies-Kitchen Award for Young Directors in 2003 and held the John S Cohen Bursary at the National Theatre Studio from 2003 to 2004. He was nominated for an Olivier Award in 2010 for Best Director for his production of Our Class, and his production of Gone Too Far! by Bola Agbaje won an Olivier Award for Outstanding Achievement in an Affiliate Theatre in 2008. The Brothers Size won Best International Production at the Barcelona Critics Circle Awards 2008 and was nominated for an Olivier Award in the same year. Bijan's production of Nothing for Glyndebourne was nominated for a 2017 Southbank Sky Arts Award for Best Opera.

== Credits ==
- Through His Teeth by Luke Bedford and David Harrower (2014, Royal Opera House)
- A Taste of Honey by Shelagh Delaney (2014, National Theatre)
- Emil and the Detectives (2013, National Theatre)
- Romeo and Juliet (2013 primary schools tour and National Theatre)
- Damned by Despair by Tirso de Molina (2012, Olivier Theatre)
- War Horse (US tour 2012–2014)
- The House of Bernarda Alba by Lorca (2011, Almeida Theatre)
- The Kitchen by Arnold Wesker (2011, National Theatre)
- Moonlight by Harold Pinter (2011, Donmar Warehouse)
- Greenland by Moira Buffini, Jack Thorne, Penelope Skinner and Matt Charman (2011, Lyttelton Theatre)
- The Typist by Rebecca Lenkiewicz (2010 Sky Arts/Riverside Studios)
- Eurydice by Sarah Ruhl (2010, ATC and Young Vic)
- Our Class by Tadeusz Slobodzianek (2009, National Theatre) Olivier Award nomination for Best Director
- Ghosts or Those Who Return by Henrik Ibsen and Rebecca Lenkiewicz (2009, ATC & Arcola Theatre)
- Tarantula in Petrol Blue by Anna Meredith and Philip Ridley (2009, Aldeburgh Music Festival)
- The Brothers Size by Tarell McCraney (2007, Young Vic and Tour/ 2008 Young Vic, UK Tour and Arcola Theatre Istanbul). Olivier nomination for Outstanding Achievement in an Affiliate Theatre and winner of the Barcelona Critics' Circle Award for best international production.
- Gone Too Far! (2007, Royal Court Theatre/ 2008 Hackney Empire/Albany tour with ATC). Olivier Award for Outstanding Achievement in an affiliate theatre.
- Fixer by Lydia Adetunji (2006 Almeida Theatre)
- Other Hands by Laura Wade (2006, Soho Theatre)
- Last Summer At Chulimsk (2006, Old Museum Arts Centre, Belfast - reading)
- Breath by Samuel Beckett (2006, BAC)
- Flush by David Dipper (2004, Soho Theatre)
- Party Time/One for the Road by Harold Pinter (2003, BAC)
- Have I None by Edward Bond (2002, Southwark Playhouse)
- Summer by Edward Bond (2002, Lion & Unicorn Theatre)
- The Lover by Harold Pinter (2000, Burton Taylor Theatre, Oxford)

=== Assistant director credits ===
- Measure for Measure development workshops (2008, assistant to Peter Brook, Bouffes du Nord)
- The Tempest by Thomas Ades (2007, Royal Opera House)
- Cinderella (2006, China Children's National Theatre)
- The Tempest by Thomas Ades (2005, Copenhagen Opera House)
- As You Like It (2005, Young Vic/ Wyndham's Theatre)
- A Dream Play by Strindberg (2005, NT)
- Twelfth Night (2004, English Touring Theatre)
- The Io Passion by Harrison Birtwistle (2004, Almeida Theatre)
- Terrorism by the Preshnikov Brothers (2003, Royal Court Theatre)
