= David Nicholls (writer) =

British novelist and screenwriter (born 1966)

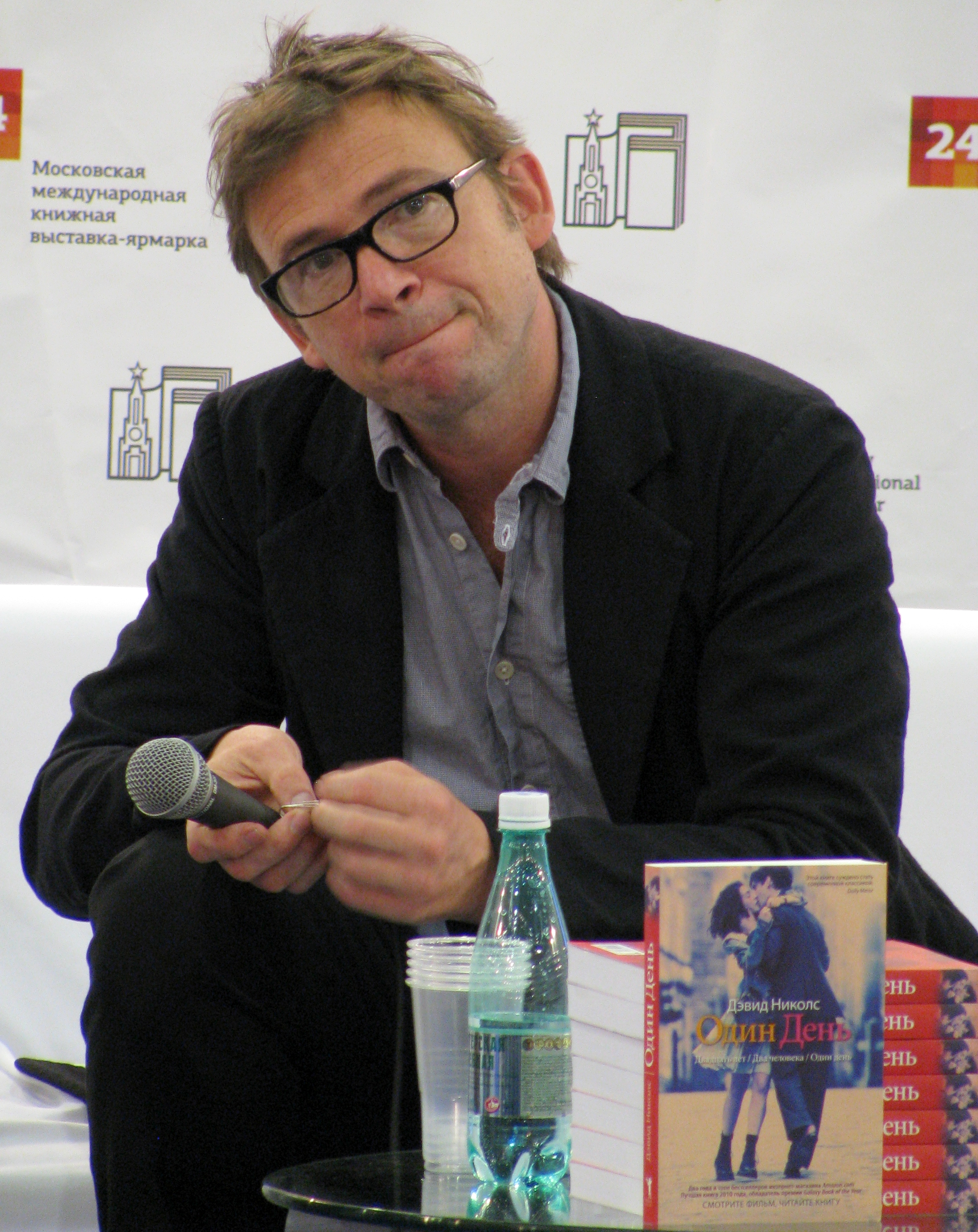
- Nicholls in 2011
- Born: David Alan Nicholls; 30 November 1966 (age 59); Eastleigh, Hampshire, England
- Education: Royal Central School of Speech and Drama; University of Bristol (BA)
- Occupations: Novelist; Screenwriter; Former actor
- Writing career
- Period: 1999–present
- Notable works: Starter for Ten; One Day; Us; Patrick Melrose; Sweet Sorrow

David Alan Nicholls (born 30 November 1966) is a British novelist and screenwriter. Initially an actor after graduating from college, he became a screenwriter, notably creating the television series Rescue Me (2002) and adaptations of novels, plays, and memoirs. He is the author of six novels, including One Day (2009).

== Early life and education ==
Nicholls is the middle of three siblings. He attended Barton Peveril College at Eastleigh, Hampshire, taking A-levels in Drama, English Literature, Physics and Biology. He took part in college drama productions, playing a wide range of roles. He went on to train at the Royal Central School of Speech and Drama. In 1988, he received a BA degree in drama and English from the University of Bristol. Later, he trained as an actor at the American Musical and Dramatic Academy in New York.

== First career ==
Throughout his 20s, he worked as an actor, using the stage name David Holdaway. He played small roles at various theatres, including the West Yorkshire Playhouse and, for a three-year period, at the Royal National Theatre. He struggled as an actor and has said: "I'd committed myself to a profession for which I lacked not just talent and charisma, but the most basic of skills. Moving, standing still – things like that." Nicholls says that a turning point in his career came when a friend gave him a copy of P. J. Kavanagh's memoir The Perfect Stranger (1966), which tells the author's own tale of maturation, finding love, and discovering his path in life.

== Writing career ==
=== Novels ===
Nicholls's third novel, One Day (2009), became an international bestseller and stayed in the Sunday Times top ten bestseller list for 10 weeks upon publication. It has since sold more than six million copies worldwide and been translated into 40 languages. The novel follows the lives of two characters - Emma and Dexter - on the same day each year over a 20-year period. A film adaptation under the same name was released in 2011, starring Anne Hathaway. In 2024, a 14-part Netflix adaptation premiered, reaching the top ten in 89 countries and garnering widespread acclaim.

Nicholl's six novels are about love and the experience of love in various life stages – with protagonists ranging from Douglas (58) at the end of his fourth novel Us (2014), to Charlie (16) at the start of his fifth novel Sweet Sorrow (2019), and Marnie (38) and Michael (42) in You Are Here (2024).

=== Screenwriting ===
Nicholls co-wrote the adapted screenplay of Simpatico (1999) and contributed four scripts to the third series of Cold Feet (2000). For the latter, he was nominated for a British Academy Television Craft Award for Best New Writer (Fiction). He created the Granada Television pilot and miniseries I Saw You (2000, 2002) and the Tiger Aspect six-part series Rescue Me (2002). Rescue Me lasted for only one series before being cancelled; Nicholls had written four episodes for the second series before being told of the cancellation. His anger over this led to him taking a break from screenwriting to concentrate on writing Starter for Ten (2003). When he returned to screenwriting, he adapted Much Ado About Nothing into a one-hour segment of the BBC's 2005 ShakespeaRe-Told season. For this, he was nominated for the British Academy Television Award for Best Single Drama. He wrote a screen adaptation of his novel One Day, which was made into a film starring Anne Hathaway and Jim Sturgess. In 2005, Nicholls wrote Aftersun for the Old Vic's 24-Hour Play festival. The play, starring James Nesbitt, Saffron Burrows, Catherine Tate and Gael García Bernal, was just 10 minutes long. Nicholls developed Aftersun into a one-off comedy for BBC One. It starred Peter Capaldi and Sarah Parish and was broadcast in 2006.

In 2006, his film adaptation Starter for 10 was released in cinemas. The following year, he wrote And When Did You Last See Your Father?, an adaptation of the memoir by Blake Morrison. His adaptation of Tess of the D'Urbervilles for the BBC aired in 2008. He has also adapted Great Expectations; the screenplay was listed on the 2009 Brit List, an annual industry poll of the best unmade scripts outside the United States. He wrote The 7.39, which was broadcast on BBC One in January 2014.

In 2015, he wrote the screenplay for Far from the Madding Crowd, an adaptation of Thomas Hardy's 1874 novel of the same name, for BBC Films. It is the fourth film adaptation of the novel.

Nicholls worked on the initial script for Bridget Jones's Baby (2016) but the script was re-written and he was not credited in the film. He wrote Patrick Melrose (2018), a five-part television series based on Edward St Aubyn's novels, and received a nomination for the Primetime Emmy Award for Outstanding Writing for a Limited Series, Movie, or Dramatic Special for his work on the show.

Theatre academic Martin White stated that Nicholl’s "work as a novelist is remarkable for its ability to appeal not only to the widest readership, but also to win plaudits from the most serious critics", noting "[his] ability to fuse, often in a single moment, as in life, both the height and depth of experience, being the sure sign of a writer of distinction".

== Personal life ==
Nicholls lives in Highbury in North London, with his partner of more than 25 years, Hannah Weaver, a script editor.

In 2015, Nicholl's was featured on BBC Radio 2's Book Club where he discussed his novel One Day. In August 2024, Nicholls was featured on the BBC Radio 4's Desert Island Discs.

== Awards and honours ==
=== Literary awards ===
- 2010: Galaxy Book of the Year Award, winner for One Day
- 2014: Specsavers National Book Awards for UK Author of the Year, winner for Us
- 2014: Man Booker Prize, longlisted for Us
- 2024: Bollinger Everyman Wodehouse Prize, shortlisted for You Are Here
- 2024: Books Are My Bag Readers' Awards, winner of the 'Fiction' category for You Are Here

=== Honours ===
- 2015: Honorary DLitt from the University of Edinburgh
- 2016: Honorary DLitt from the University of Bristol

== Novels ==
- Starter for Ten (2003)
- The Understudy (2005)
- One Day (2009)
- Us (2014)
- Sweet Sorrow (2019)
- You Are Here (2024)
