= 2021 in literature =

This article contains information about the literary events and publications of 2021.

== Events ==
- January 1 – British writer and illustrator Anthony Browne is appointed a Commander of the Order of the British Empire (CBE) in the 2021 New Year Honours for services to literature.
- September 7 – A Radio-Canada article reveals that 5,000 books from 30 French-language school libraries in Southwestern Ontario were destroyed by the Conseil scolaire catholique Providence because they included racial stereotypes relating to Indigenous peoples of the Americas. Although intended as a "gesture of reconciliation", the action meets with widespread condemnation.
- October 6 – The National Assembly of France adopts new legislation mandating a minimum price on book deliveries to protect independent bookstores from e-commerce giants including Amazon and Fnac, who have circumvented a 2014 law banning the free delivery of books by offering discounted shipping at €0.01.

== New books ==
=== Fiction ===
New adult fiction, sorted by author's last name
Author	Title	Date of Pub.	Ref.
Anuk Arudpragasam	A Passage North	July 13	
S.A Cosby	Razorblade Tears	July 6	
Rachel Cusk	Second Place	May 4	
Claire Fuller	Unsettled Ground	March 25	
Damon Galgut	The Promise	May	
Lauren Groff	Matrix	September 7	
Jakob Guanzon	Abundance	March 2	
Nathan Harris	The Sweetness of Water	June 15	
Zakiya Dalila Harris	The Other Black Girl	June 1	
Kazuo Ishiguro	Klara and the Sun	March 2	
Stephen Graham Jones	My Heart Is a Chainsaw	August 31	
Caroline Kepnes	You Love Me	April 6	
Stephen King	Billy Summers	August 3	
Stephen King	Later	March 2	
Emily Layden	All Girls	February 16	
John le Carré	Silverview	October 12	
Jamie Marina Lau	Gunk Baby	April 28	
Patricia Lockwood	No One Is Talking About This	February 16	
Nadifa Mohamed	The Fortune Men	May 27	
Ewan Morrison	How to Survive Everything	March 1	
Jason Mott	Hell of a Book	June 28	
Caleb Azumah Nelson	Open Water	February 4	
Viet Thanh Nguyen	The Committed	March 2	
Anna North	Outlawed	January 5	
Nnedi Okorafor	Remote Control	January 19	
Helen Oyeyemi	Peaces	April 6	
Lauren Oyler	Fake Accounts	February 2	
Lindsay Pereira	Gods and Ends	March 22	
Richard Powers	Bewilderment	September 21	
Sally Rooney	Beautiful World, Where Are You	September 7	
Mohamed Mbougar Sarr	La plus secrète mémoire des hommes	August 19	
Maggie Shipstead	Great Circle	May 4	
Michael Farris Smith	Nick	January 5	
Wole Soyinka	Chronicles from the Land of the Happiest People on Earth	September 28	
Francis Spufford	Light Perpetual	May 18	
Elizabeth Strout	Oh William!	October 19	
Colson Whitehead	Harlem Shuffle	September 14	
Joy Williams	Harrow	September 14	

=== Children and young adults ===
New books for children and young adults, sorted by date of publication
Author	Title	Date of Pub.	Ref.
Moa Backe Åstot	Himlabrand (translated as Fire From the Sky)	January, Sweden	
Joanna Ho	Eyes That Kiss in the Corners	January 5	
Bassem Yousef and Catherine R. Daly	The Magical Reality of Nadia	January 5	
Corey R. Tabor	Mel Fell	February 2	
Carole Boston Weatherford	Unspeakable: The Tulsa Race Massacre	February 2	
Rose Szabo	What Big Teeth	February 2	
Philippa Dowding	Firefly	February 6	
Angeline Boulley	Firekeeper's Daughter	March 16	
Jory John	Something's Wrong!: A Bear, a Hare, and Some Underwear	March 23	
Matt Walsh	Johnny the Walrus	March 29	
Andrea Wang	Watercress	March 30	
Micha Archer	Wonder Walkers	March 30	
Roshani Chokshi	Aru Shah and the City of Gold	April 6	
Charlie Jane Anders	Victories Greater Than Death	April 13	
Kyle Lukoff	Too Bright to See	April 20	
Shawn Harris	Have You Ever Seen a Flower?	May 4	
Dawn Quigley	Jo Jo Makoons	May 11	
Ibram X. Kendi and Jason Reynolds	Stamped (For Kids): Racism, Antiracism, and You	May 11	
Adiba Jaigirdar	Hani and Ishu's Guide to Fake Dating	May 25	
Ashley Herring Blake	Hazel Bly and the Deep Blue Sea	May 25	
Faridah Àbíké-Íyímídé	Ace of Spades	June 1	
Meghan Markle	The Bench	June 8	
Joy Keller	Frankenslime	July 13	
Crystal Frasier	Cheer Up: Love and Pompoms	August 10	
Amber McBride	Me (Moth)	August 17	
Jordan Ifueko	Redemptor	August 27	
Michael G. Long	Three Lines in a Circle	August 31	
Ayana Gray	Beasts of Prey	September 28	
Benjamin Alire Sáenz	Aristotle and Dante Dive into the Waters of the World	October 12	
J. K. Rowling	The Christmas Pig	October 12	
Donna Barba Higuera	The Last Cuentista	October 12	
Naseem Hrab	The Sour Cherry Tree	October 15	
Eoin Colfer	The Fowl Twins Get What They Deserve	October 19	
Rick Riordan	Daughter of the Deep	October 26	
Jeff Kinney	Diary of a Wimpy Kid: Big Shot	October 26	
Roseanne A. Brown	A Psalm of Storms and Silence	November 2	
Natasha Bowen	Skin of the Sea	November 2	
Harmony Becker	Himawari House	November 9	
Nikole Hannah-Jones and Renée Watson	The 1619 Project: Born on the Water	November 16	
Charlotte Sullivan Wild	Love, Violet	November 16	
Mac Barnett	What Is Love?	December 28	

=== Poetry ===
New poetry books, sorted by date of publication
Author	Title	Date of pub.	Ref.
Amanda Gorman	The Hill We Climb: Poems	March 30, US	
Hannah Lowe	The Kids	September 16, US	
Amanda Gorman	Call Us What We Carry	December 7, US	

=== Drama ===
- Giles Terera – The Meaning of Zong

=== Non-fiction ===
New nonfiction books, sorted by date of publication
Author	Title	Date of pub.	Ref.
Joan Didion	Let Me Tell You What I Mean	January 26	
Elizabeth Kolbert	Under a White Sky	February 9	
Heather McGhee	The Sum of Us	February 9	
Bill Gates	How to Avoid a Climate Disaster	February 16	
Jordan Peterson	Beyond Order: 12 More Rules for Life	March 2	
Julia Galef	The Scout Mindset: Why Some People See Things Clearly and Others Don't	April 13	
Patrick Radden Keefe	Empire of Pain: The Secret History of the Sackler Dynasty	April 13	
Sasha Issenberg	The Engagement: America's Quarter-Century Struggle Over Same-Sex Marriage	June 1	
Lawrence Wright	The Plague Year: America in the Time of Covid	June 8	
Michael Holding	Why We Kneel, How We Rise	June 24	
Sam Kean	The Icepick Surgeon: Murder, Fraud, Sabotage, Piracy, and Other Dastardly Deeds Perpetrated in the Name of Science	July 13	
Sarah Gristwood	The Tudors in Love: Passion and Politics in the Age of England's Most Famous Dynasty	September 23	
Sanjay Gupta	World War C: Lessons from the COVID-19 Pandemic and How to Prepare for the Next One	October 5	
Paul McCartney and Paul Muldoon	The Lyrics: 1956 to the Present	November 2	
Zoë Playdon	The Hidden Case of Ewan Forbes: The Transgender Trial That Threatened to Upend the British Establishment	November 11	
Brené Brown	Atlas of the Heart	November 30	

=== Biography and memoirs ===
New biographies and memoirs, sorted by last name
Author	Title	Date of pub.	Ref.
Blake Bailey	Philip Roth: The Biography	May 26	
Hunter Biden	Beautiful Things	April 6	
Brian Broome	Punch Me Up to the Gods	May 18	
Walter Isaacson	The Code Breaker: Jennifer Doudna, Gene Editing, and the Future of the Human Race	March 9	
Sinéad O'Connor	Rememberings	June 1	
Nadia Owusu	Aftershocks: A Memoir	January 12	
Michelle Zauner	Crying in H Mart	April 20	
Joshua Prager	The Family Roe: An American Story	September 14	

== Deaths ==
Deaths sorted by date of death
Individual	Background	Date of death	Age	Cause of death	Ref.
Mary Catherine Bateson	Daughter of Margaret Mead, American author and anthropologist	January 2	81	Brain damage	
Eric Jerome Dickey	American novelist	January 3	59	Cancer	
Neil Sheehan	American journalist and Pulitzer Prize-winning author	January 7	84	Complications from Parkinson's disease	
Christopher Little	J. K. Rowling's literary agent	January 7	79	Cancer	
Ved Mehta	MacArthur Fellow, New Yorker writer, influential mentor, and chronicler of India	January 9	87	Complications from Parkinson's disease	
Vassilis Alexakis	Greek-born French writer and translator	January 11	77		
Sharon Kay Penman	American historian and novelist	January 22	75	Pneumonia	
Martha Madrigal	Mexican poet	January 23	92	COVID-19	
Lars Norén	Swedish playwright, novelist and poet	January 26	77	COVID-19	
Maria Guarnaschelli	American cookbook editor	February 6	79	Heart disease	
Jean-Claude Carrière	French novelist, screenwriter and actor	February 8	89		
Lawrence Otis Graham	American essayist and cultural critic	February 19	59		
Lawrence Ferlinghetti	American beat poet, publisher, and co-founder of City Lights Bookstore	February 22	101	Interstitial lung disease	
Enrique González Rojo, Jr.	Mexican writer and philosopher	March 5	92		
N. S. Lakshminarayan Bhat	Indian poet	March 6	84		
Valentin Kurbatov	Russian literary critic and writer	March 6	81		
Djibril Tamsir Niane	Guinean writer and historian	March 8	89	COVID-19	
Norton Juster	American writer	March 8	91	Complication from a stroke	
Joan Walsh Anglund	American poet and children's book author and illustrator	March 9	95	Heart failure	
Robert Middlekauff	American historian	March 10	91	Complication from a stroke	
Nawal El Saadawi	Egyptian feminist and writer	March 21	89		
Adam Zagajewski	Polish poet	March 21	75		
Morris Dickstein	American literary critic and cultural historian	March 24	81	Complications from Parkinson's disease	
Beverly Cleary	Children's book writer	March 25	104		
Larry McMurtry	American novelist	March 25	84		
Giancarlo DiTrapano	Founder of Tyrant Books	March 30	47		
Arthur Kopit	American playwright	April 2	83		
Denis Donoghue	Irish academic and literary critic	April 6	92		
Vartan Gregorian	Saved the New York Public Library	April 15	87		
Anthony Thwaite	English poet and editor	April 22	90		
Pieter Aspe	Belgian writer	May 2	68		
Jesús Hilario Tundidor	Spanish poet	May 2	85		
Lucinda Franks	Journalist and memoirist, first women to win a Pulitzer Prize for national reporting	May 5	74		
Kentaro Miura	Japanese manga artist	May 6	54	Acute aortic dissection	
Eric Carle	American children's book writer and illustrator	May 23	91	Kidney failure	
Dan Frank	Editorial director of Pantheon Books	May 24	67		
Friederike Mayröcker	Austrian poet and writer	June 4	96		
Richard Robinson	Turned Scholastic into a major children's book publisher	June 5	84		
Janet Malcolm	American journalist, biographer, and writer for The New Yorker	June 16	86	Lung cancer	
Stephen Dunn	American Pulitzer Prize-winning poet	June 24	82	Complications from Parkinson's disease	
Elizabeth Martinez	American author who jumpstarted the Chicana movement	June 29	95		
Athan Theoharis	American historian	July 3	84	Pneumonia	
Roberto Calasso	Italian novelist, critic, scholar, and publisher	July 28	80		
Jean Breeze	Jamaican dub poet and storyteller	August 4	65	Chronic obstructive pulmonary disease (COPD)	
Donald Kagan	American historian	August 6	89		
Jill Murphy	British children's author and illustrator	August 18	72	Cancer	
James W. Loewen	American sociologist and author	August 19	79	Bladder cancer	
David Roberts	American adventure writer	August 20	78		
Russ Kick	American writer and editor	September 12	52		
Charles W. Mills	American philosopher	September 20	70	Cancer	
Takao Saito	Japanese manga artist	September 24	84	Pancreatic cancer	
Gary Paulsen	American author	October 13	82	Cardiac arrest	
Máire Mhac an tSaoi	Irish language scholar and poet	October 16	99		
Brendan Kennelly	Irish poet	October 17	85		
Jerry Pinkney	American children's book writer and illustrator	October 20	81	Heart attack	
Raúl Rivero	Cuban poet	November 6	75		
Sylvère Lotringer	French literary critic and founder of Semiotexte(e)	November 8	83		
Jakucho Setouchi	Japanese feminist writer	November 9	99	Heart failure	
Petra Mayer	American book editor	November 13	46	Pulmonary embolism	
Etel Adnan	Lebanese-American novelist	November 14	96		
Robert Bly	American poet, translator, and author	November 21	96	Complications of Alzheimer's disease	
Almudena Grandes	Spanish novelist	November 21	94	Cancer	
Andrew Vachss	American crime writer	November 23	79	Coronary artery disease	
Marie-Claire Blais	Canadian writer	November 30	82		
Miroslav Zikmund	Czech adventurer, travel writer and film director	December 1	102		
Greg Tate	American journalist and cultural critic	December 7	64		
Anne Rice	American author	December 12	80	Complications from a stroke	
bell hooks	American author and feminist	December 15	69	Kidney failure	
Madhur Kapila	Indian journalist, novelist, art critic, and reviewer of Hindi literature	December 19	79	Cardiac arrest	
Myrna Manzanares	Belizean writer and activist	December 21	75	Complications from a stroke	
Joan Didion	American author and memoirist	December 23	87	Complications from Parkinson's disease	
Keri Hulme	New Zealand writer (The Bone People) and poet	December 25	74	Chronic medical issues	

== Awards ==
2021 literary award winners, sorted alphabetically by award
Award	Category	Author	Title	Ref.
Akutagawa Prize		Kotomi Li	Higanbana ga saku shima	
Akutagawa Prize		Mai Ishizawa	Kai ni tsudzuku basho nite	
Akutagawa Prize		Bunji Sunakawa	Black Box	
America Award in Literature		Rosmarie Waldrop	—	
Andre Norton Award		Ursula Vernon	A Wizard's Guide to Defensive Baking	
Anisfield-Wolf Book Award	Fiction	James McBride	Deacon King Kong	
Anisfield-Wolf Book Award	Nonfiction	Vincent Brown	Tacky’s Revolt: The Story of an Atlantic Slave War	
Anisfield-Wolf Book Award	Nonfiction	Natasha Trethewey	Memorial Drive	
Anisfield-Wolf Book Award	Poetry	Victoria Chang	OBIT	
Anisfield-Wolf Book Award	Lifetime Achievement	Samuel R. Delany	—	
Arthur C. Clarke Award		Laura Jean McKay	The Animals in That Country	
Baillie Gifford Prize		Patrick Radden Keefe	Empire of Pain: The Secret History of the Sackler Dynasty	
BBC National Short Story Award		Lucy Caldwell	All the People Were Mean and Bad	
Bookseller/Diagram Prize for Oddest Title of the Year		Roy Schwartz	Is Superman Circumcised?	
Booker Prize	Booker Prize	Damon Galgut	The Promise	
Booker Prize	International Booker Prize	David Diop with Anna Moschovakis (trans.)	At Night All Blood Is Black	
Bram Stoker Award	BSA–Best (Horror) Novel	Stephen Graham Jones	My Heart is a Chainsaw	
British Book Awards	Author of the Year	Marian Keyes	—	
British Book Awards	Book of the Year	Marcus Rashford	You Are a Champion: How To Be the Best You Can Be	
British Book Awards	Children's Book of the Year	Phil Earle	When The Sky Falls	
British Book Awards	Fiction Book of the Year	Meg Mason	Sorrow and Bliss	
British Book Awards	Crime & Thriller	William McIlvanney; Ian Rankin	The Dark Remains	
British Book Awards	Nonfiction Narrative	Sathnam Sanghera	Empireland	
British Fantasy Award	Fantasy Novel (Robert Holdstock Award)	Alix E. Harrow	The Once and Future Witches	
British Fantasy Award	Horror Novel (August Derleth Award)	Silvia Moreno-Garcia	Mexican Gothic	
British Fantasy Award	Novella	P. Djèlí Clark	Ring Shout	
British Fantasy Award	Short Story	Ida Keogh	“Infinite Tea in the Demara Café”	
British Fantasy Award	Collection	Charlotte Bond	The Watcher in the Woods	
British Fantasy Award	Anthology	Zelda Knight & Oghenechovwe	Dominion: An Anthology of Speculative Fiction from Africa and the African Diaspora	
British Fantasy Award	Non-fiction	Alison Peirse, ed.	Women Make Horror: Filmmaking, Feminism, Genre	
Caine Prize for African Writing		Meron Hadero	"The Street Sweep"	
Camões Prize		Paulina Chiziane	—	
Carl Zuckmayer Medal		Nora Gomringer	—	
Carnegie Medal		Jason Reynolds	Look Both Ways	
Center for Fiction First Novel Prize		Kirstin Valdez Quade	The Five Wounds	
Costa Book Awards	Costa Book of the Year	Claire Fuller	Unsettled Ground	
Costa Book Awards	Costa–Novel	Claire Fuller	Unsettled Ground	
Costa Book Awards	Costa–Biography	John Preston	Fall: The Mystery of Robert Maxwell	
Costa Book Awards	Costa–Children's Book	Manjeet Mann	The Crossing	
Costa Book Awards	Costa–First Novel	Caleb Azumah Nelson	Open Water	
Costa Book Awards	Costa–Poetry	Hannah Lowe	The Kids	
Danuta Gleed Literary Award		Jack Wang	We Two Alone	
David Cohen Prize		Colm Tóibín	—	
Desmond Elliott Prize		A.K. Blakemore	The Manningtree Witches	
Dylan Thomas Prize		Raven Leilani	Luster	
Edgar Awards	Best Novel	Deepa Anappara	Djinn Patrol on the Purple Line	
Edgar Awards	Raven Award	Malice Domestic	—	
Edgar Awards	Ellery Queen Award	Reagan Arthur	—	
Edgar Awards	Robert L. Fish Memorial Award	Colette Bancroft	"The Bite"	
Edgar Awards	Mary Higgins Clark	Elsa Hart	The Cabinets of Barnaby Mayne	
Edgar Awards	Sue Grafton Memorial Award	Rosalie Knecht	Vera Kelly is Not a Mystery	
Edgar Awards	Grand Master	Charlaine Harris	—	
Edgar Awards	Grand Master	Jeffery Deaver	—	
Eugie Award		Elaine Cuyegkeng	"The Genetic Alchemist's Daughter"	
European Book Prize	European Book Prize (Novel)	Christos Chomenidis	Νίκη	
Folio Prize		Carmen Maria Machado	In the Dream House	
Franz Kafka Prize		Ivan Vyskočil	—	
Giller Prize		Omar El Akkad	What Strange Paradise	
Goldsmiths Prize		Isabel Waidner	Sterling Karat Gold	
Gordon Burn Prize		Hanif Abdurraqib	A Little Devil in America	
Governor General's Awards	Governor General's Award for English-language fiction	Norma Dunning	Tainna	
Governor General's Awards	Governor General's Award for English-language non-fiction	Sadiqa de Meijer	alfabet/alphabet: a memoir of a first language	
Governor General's Awards	Governor General's Award for English-language drama	Hannah Moscovitch	Sexual Misconduct of the Middle Classes	
Governor General's Awards	Governor General's Award for English-language poetry	Tolu Oloruntoba	The Junta of Happenstance	
Governor General's Awards	Governor General's Award for English-language children's literature	Philippa Dowding	Firefly	
Governor General's Awards	Governor General's Award for English-language children's illustration	David A. Robertson, Julie Flett	On the Trapline	
Governor General's Awards	Governor General's Award for French to English translation	Erín Moure	This Radiant Life	
Governor General's Awards	Governor General's Award for French-language fiction	Fanny Britt	Faire les sucres	
Governor General's Awards	Governor General's Award for French-language non-fiction	Serge Bouchard, Mark Fortier	Du diesel dans les veines	
Governor General's Awards	Governor General's Award for French-language drama	Mishka Lavigne	Copeaux	
Governor General's Awards	Governor General's Award for French-language poetry	Tania Langlais	Pendant que Perceval tombait	
Governor General's Awards	Governor General's Award for French-language children's literature	Jean-François Sénéchal	Les Avenues	
Governor General's Awards	Governor General's Award for French-language children's illustration	Mario Brassard, Gérard DuBois	À qui appartiennent les nuages ?	
Governor General's Awards	Governor General's Award for English to French translation	Marie Frankland	Poèmes 1938-1984	
Grand Prix du roman de l'Académie française		François-Henri Désérable	Mon maître et mon vainqueur	
Holberg Prize		Martha Nussbaum	—	
Hugo Award	Best Novel	Martha Wells	Network Effect	
Hugo Award	Best Novella	Nghi Vo	The Empress of Salt and Fortune	
Hugo Award	Best Novelette	Sarah Pinsker	"Two Truths and a Lie"	
Hugo Award	Best Short Story	Ursula Vernon	"Metal Like Blood in the Dark"	
Hugo Award	Lodestar Award	Ursula Vernon	A Wizard's Guide to Defensive Baking	
Hugo Award	Astounding Award	Emily Tesh	Silver in the Wood	
Hurston/Wright Legacy Award	Fiction	Percival Everett	Telephone	
Hurston/Wright Legacy Award	Nonfiction	Marcia Chatelain	Franchise: The Golden Arches in Black America	
Hurston/Wright Legacy Award	Debut	Rita Woods	Remembrance	
Hurston/Wright Legacy Award	Poetry	Rachel Eliza Griffiths	Seeing the Body	
International Dublin Literary Award		Valeria Luiselli	Lost Children Archive	
International Thriller Writers Award	Best Hard Cover Novel	S. A. Cosby	Blacktop Wasteland	
International Thriller Writers Award	Best Paperback Original Novel	John Marrs	What Lies Between Us	
International Thriller Writers Award	e-Book Original Novel	Jeff Buick	A Killing Game	
International Thriller Writers Award	Best First Novel	David Heska Wanbli Weiden	Winter Counts	
International Thriller Writers Award	Best Young Adult Novel	Andrea Contos	Throwaway Girls	
International Thriller Writers Award	Best Short Story	Alan Orloff	"Rent Due"	
Jerusalem Prize		Julian Barnes	—	
Kerry Group Irish Fiction Award		Anakana Schofield	BINA	
Miguel de Cervantes Prize		Cristina Peri Rossi	—	
Miles Franklin Award		Amanda Lohrey	The Labyrinth	
National Biography Award		Cassandra Pybus	Truganini: Journey Through the Apocalypse	
National Book Award	National Book Award–Fiction	Jason Mott	Hell of a Book	
National Book Award	National Book Award–Nonfiction	Tiya Miles	All That She Carried	
National Book Award	National Book Award–Poetry	Martín Espada	Floaters	
National Book Award	National Book Award–Translated Literature	Elisa Shua Dusapin with Aneesa Abbas Higgins (trans.)	Winter in Sokcho	
National Book Award	National Book Award–Young People's Literature	Malinda Lo	Last Night at the Telegraph Club	
National Book Critics Circle Award	National Book Critics–Fiction	Honorée Fanonne Jeffers	The Love Songs of W.E.B. Du Bois	
National Book Critics Circle Award	National Book Critics–Nonfiction	Clint Smith	How the Word Is Passed: A Reckoning with the History of Slavery Across America	
National Book Critics Circle Award	National Book Critics–Biography	Rebecca Donner	All the Frequent Troubles of Our Days	
National Book Critics Circle Award	National Book Critics–Criticism	Melissa Febos	Girlhood	
Nebula Award	Best Novel	Martha Wells	Network Effect	
Nebula Award	Best Novella	P. Djèlí Clark	Ring Shout	
Nebula Award	Best Novelette	Sarah Pinsker	"Two Truths and a Lie"	
Nebula Award	Best Short Story	John Wiswell	"Open House on Haunted Hill"	
Newbery Medal		Tae Keller	When You Trap a Tiger	
Nike Award	Jury Award	Zbigniew Rokita	Kajś. Opowieść o Górnym Śląsku	
Nike Award	Audience Award	Zbigniew Rokita	Kajś. Opowieść o Górnym Śląsku	
Nobel Prize in Literature		Abdulrazak Gurnah	—	
Orwell Prize	Political Fiction	Ali Smith	Summer	
Orwell Prize	Political Writing	Joshua Yaffa	Between Two Fires: Truth, Ambition and Compromise in Putin's Russia	
PEN/Faulkner Award for Fiction		Deesha Philyaw	The Secret Lives of Church Ladies	
Philip K. Dick Award	Winner	Kali Wallace	Dead Space	
Philip K. Dick Award	Special Citation	Lavie Tidhar	The Escapement	
Premio Planeta de Novela		Carmen Mola	La bestia	
Premio Strega Prize		Emanuele Trevi	Due vite	
Pritzker Literature Award		Margaret MacMillan	—	
Prix Femina	Prix Femina	Clara Dupont-Monod	S'adapter	
Prix Femina	Prix Femina étranger	Ahmet Altan	Hayat Hanım	
Prix Femina	Prix Femina essai	Annie Cohen-Solal	Un étranger nommé Picasso	
Prix Femina	Prix Femina des lycéens	Ananda Devi	Le rire des déesses	
Prix Goncourt		Mohamed Mbougar Sarr	La plus secrète mémoire des hommes	
Prix Médicis		Christine Angot	Le Voyage dans l'Est	
Prix Renaudot		Amélie Nothomb	Premier sang	
Pulitzer Prize	Pulitzer Prize for Fiction	Louise Erdrich	The Night Watchman	
Pulitzer Prize	Pulitzer Prize for Drama	Katori Hall	The Hot Wing King	
Pulitzer Prize	Pulitzer Prize for Nonfiction	David Zucchino	Wilmington’s Lie: The Murderous Coup of 1898 and the Rise of White Supremacy	
Pulitzer Prize	Pulitzer Prize for History	Marcia Chatelain	Franchise: The Golden Arches in Black America	
Pulitzer Prize	Pulitzer Prize for Biography	Les Payne and Tamara Payne	The Dead Are Arising: The Life of Malcolm X	
Struga Poetry Evenings	Golden Wreath laureate	Carol Ann Duffy	—	
Struga Poetry Evenings	Bridges of Struga laureate	Vladan Kreckovic	—	
Walter Scott Prize		Hilary Mantel	The Mirror and the Light	
Whiting Awards	Whiting Award for Fiction	Claire Boyles	—	
Whiting Awards	Whiting Award for Fiction	Rita Bullwinkel	—	
Whiting Awards	Whiting Award for Fiction	Megha Majumdar	—	
Whiting Awards	Whiting Award for Fiction	Nana Nkweti	—	
Women's Prize for Fiction		Susanna Clarke	Piranesi	
World Fantasy Award	Novel	Alaya Dawn Johnson	Trouble the Saints	
World Fantasy Award	Novella	Tochi Onyebuchi	Riot Baby	
World Fantasy Award	Short Fiction	Celeste Rita Baker	"Glass Bottle Dancer"	
World Fantasy Award	Collection	Aoko Matsuda	Where the Wild Ladies Are	
Writers' Trust of Canada	Shaughnessy Cohen Prize for Political Writing	Ronald Deibert	Reset: Reclaiming the Internet for Civil Society	
Writers' Trust of Canada	RBC Bronwen Wallace Award for Emerging Writers	Anna Ling Kaye	"East City"	
Writers' Trust of Canada	RBC Bronwen Wallace Award for Emerging Writers	Zehra Naqvi	"The Knot of My Tongue"	
Writers' Trust of Canada	Dayne Ogilvie Prize	Jillian Christmas		
Writers' Trust of Canada	Atwood Gibson Writers' Trust Fiction Prize	Katherena Vermette	The Strangers	
Writers' Trust of Canada	Hilary Weston Writers' Trust Prize for Nonfiction	Tomson Highway	Permanent Astonishment	
Writers' Trust of Canada	Latner Writers' Trust Poetry Prize	Weyman Chan		
Writers' Trust of Canada	Matt Cohen Award	Frances Itani		
Writers' Trust of Canada	Vicky Metcalf Award for Literature for Young People	Linda Bailey		
Writers' Trust of Canada	Writers' Trust Engel/Findley Award	Cherie Dimaline		
Writers' Trust of Canada	Balsillie Prize for Public Policy	Dan Breznitz	Innovation in Real Places: Strategies for Prosperity in an Unforgiving World	
W. Y. Boyd Literary Award for Excellence in Military Fiction		Mark Treanor	A Quiet Cadence: A Novel	
Zbigniew Herbert International Literary Award		Yusef Komunyakaa	—	
