= Rozsa Gaston =

- Education: Yale University, Columbia University
- Occupation: Author
- Writing career
- Genres: Historical fiction, historical biographies, women’s fiction

Rozsa Gaston is an American author known for writing historical fiction on powerful women who shaped early modern Europe. Her work focuses on bringing attention to influential women of the late fifteenth and early sixteenth centuries, including Anne Boleyn, Margaret of Austria and Anne of Brittany.

== Education and career ==
Gaston earned a BA in history from Yale University and received a Master of International Affairs (MIA) from Columbia University School of International and Public Affairs.

As part of her graduate work, Gaston spent a year at Institut de Sciences Politiques (Sciences Po), in Paris. Gaston worked at Institutional Investor magazine, WR Capital, and later wrote as a columnist for The Westchester Guardian.

== Writings ==
In 2018, she began the four-part Anne of Brittany historical fiction series with Anne and Charles, and Anne and Louis: Passion and Politics in Early Renaissance France, winner of the general fiction category of the Publishers Weekly BookLife Prize.

In 2019, she published Anne and Louis: Rulers and Lovers, and Anne and Louis Forever Bound, 2021 Chaucer Book Awards first-place winner for early historical fiction.

As a result of her research on Anne of Brittany, Gaston discovered Margaret of Austria, ruler of the Burgundian-Habsburg Netherlands from 1507 to 1530. Her historical biography, Margaret of Austria, won first place in the 2022 Chaucer Book Awards for early historical fiction.

While researching Margaret of Austria's story, Gaston discovered that English queen Anne Boleyn had spent her first year outside of England at Margaret of Austria's court as a maid of honour. She then moved on to France, where she spent seven subsequent years serving under two queens of France. Finding very little on Anne Boleyn before she joined the Tudor court, Gaston decided to write a historical fiction series about her formative years abroad.

In 2025, Gaston published the first book of the Anne Boleyn Chronicles, Maid of Honour: Anne Boleyn at Margaret of Austria’s Court, grand prize winner of the 2023 Chaucer Book Awards for early historical fiction, which was followed in 2026 by The Queen’s Maid: Anne Boleyn in France and Queen of Diamonds.

Gaston's novels have attracted women's history readers interested in Renaissance female figures who wielded political power. Her books are noted for their blend of historical accuracy with character-driven storytelling. In a review of Gaston's Margaret of Austria, Sarah Gristwood, English journalist and author, wrote: “Compelling and wholly convincing – at once a vividly readable novel and a long-overdue presentation of Europe's unsung heroine to the broad audience she deserves."
