= Winik =

Winik is a surname. Notable people with the surname include:

- Jay Winik (born 1957), American historian
- Marion Winik, American journalist and author
- Tyler Winik, community consultant and advisor on the Florida political process
- Howard Winik, community leader in the United Kingdom and magistrate
