= Aftershock (disambiguation) =

An aftershock is a small-magnitude earthquake that occurs after a larger earthquake.

Aftershock may also refer to:

== Film and television ==
- Aftershock (1990 film), a film directed by Frank Harris
- Aftershock, alternative title of the 1992 TV movie Quake
- Aftershock (2008 film), a New Zealand telemovie starring Sarah Peirse
- Aftershock (2010 film), a film directed by Feng Xiaogang and based on the 1976 Tangshan earthquake
- Aftershock (2012 film), a horror-thriller film directed by Nicolás López
- Aftershock (2022 film), a documentary film
- Black Scorpion II: Aftershock, a 1997 comedy-action film
  - Aftershock, a villain from the TV series Black Scorpion and film Black Scorpion II: Aftershock
- Aftershock: Earthquake in New York, a 1999 American TV miniseries
- "Aftershock" (Doctors), a 2003 television episode
- "Aftershock" (Law & Order), a 1996 television episode
- "Aftershock" (Static Shock), a 2000 television episode
- Tremors 2: Aftershocks, the 1996 sequel to the 1990 film Tremors
- "Aftershocks" (Agents of S.H.I.E.L.D.), a 2015 television episode

== Music ==
- Aftershock Festival, an American hard rock/metal festival
- Aftershock (band), an American metalcore band
- Aftershock (group), a British grime collective and record label
- Aftershock (Average White Band album)
- Aftershock (Forty Foot Echo album)
- Aftershock (Motörhead album)
- Aftershock, an album by Amy Pearson
- Aftershock, an album by Aphrodite
- "Aftershock" (Cash Cash song)
- "Aftershock", a song by Demi Lovato from the Japanese deluxe edition of Unbroken and the Give Your Heart a Break EP
- "Aftershock", a song by Anthrax from Spreading the Disease
- "Aftershock", a song by Van Halen from Balance
- "Aftershocks", a song from the musical Next to Normal

== Sports ==
- Long Beach Aftershock, a women's professional football team
- Los Angeles Aftershock, a team in the Continental Basketball Association
- Shreveport Aftershock, a team in the Independent Women's Football League
- AfterShocks, The Basketball Tournament 2025 championship team

== Other uses ==
- Aftershocks (book), memoir by Nadia Owusu
- Aftershock Comics, an American comic book publisher
- Aftershock (comics), a Marvel Comics character
- Aftershock (roller coaster), a roller coaster at Silverwood Theme Park in Athol, Idaho
- UFO: Aftershock, a 2005 computer game
- WWE Aftershock, a 2005 professional wrestling video game
- Aftershocks (play), a 1993 play by Australian playwright Paul Brown
- Aftershock (novel), a 1991 crime fiction novel by Peter Corris
