= Douglas Malcolm =

British army officer acquitted of 1917 murder

- Born: James Douglas Malcolm; 1883; Highbury, London, England
- Died: 1969 (aged 85–86); Sussex, England
- Occupations: British Army officer, jute merchant
- Known for: Acquitted of murder in 1917 after shooting dead his wife's lover
- Spouse: Dorothy Vera Taylor (m.1914)
- Children: Derek Malcolm

James Douglas Malcolm (1883–1969) was a British Army officer. Whilst home on leave in 1917 during World War I, he discovered his wife Dorothy was having an affair with a Russian, Anton Baumberg. He shot him dead, and was acquitted of murder and manslaughter in a much-publicised trial at the Old Bailey.

== Early life ==
Malcolm was born in Highbury, London in 1883, the son of East India Merchant James R Malcolm and his wife Matilda E Malcolm, both born in Scotland. In 1891, they were living on the south side of Wimbledon Common, with five children, a cousin and four servants.

In 1909, Malcolm arrived in San Francisco from Yokohama having sailed on the Tenyo Maru, had no occupation, and had been living in Hove, Sussex, where his relative was J R Malcolm, and was going on to London. He was 5'11" tall.

In 1911, Malcolm was single and a jute merchant, living in Hove, and at his older brother grain merchant John W Malcolm's house in Mayfair.

== Personal life ==
In 1914, he married Dorothy V Taylor. In 1932, when Dorothy was 42, they had their only child, the film critic Derek Malcolm.

== Killing of wife's lover, murder trial, and acquittal ==
Malcolm was a Lieutenant in the Royal Artillery. In 1917, on leave from the front, he returned home to find his wife absent, and eventually tracked her down and found her with Anton Baumberg, both partly clothed. He tracked him down to a seedy lodging house behind Paddington Station, London, where he went with his service revolver and a whip, intending to horsewhip him, but shot him four times. Baumberg was the self-styled Count de Borch, and was actually a Russian Jew. He had left Russia for Switzerland and then England, to work in the Waring & Gillow furniture store in London. After the First World War started, he was rejected when he tried to join the British Army and was interviewed by Scotland Yard.

At his trial for murder in 1917, the defence was led by Sir John Simon, the prosecution by Richard David Muir, and the judge was Henry McCardie. Malcolm was held at Brixton Prison during the trial. It is believed to have been the first crime of passion defence case in the British courts.

== Death ==
Malcolm died in 1969, in Sussex, England, aged 86.
