= Derek Malcolm =

English film critic and historian (1932–2023)

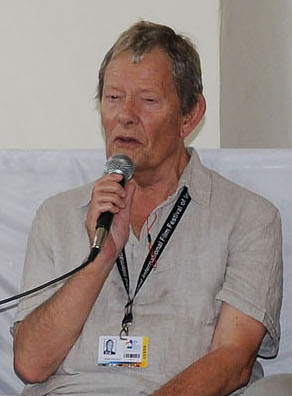
- Malcolm in 2012
- Born: Derek Elliston Michael Malcolm; 12 May 1932; London, England
- Died: 15 July 2023 (aged 91); Deal, Kent, England
- Occupations: Film critic; historian
- Spouse: Sarah Gristwood (m. 1994)
- Father: Douglas Malcolm

Derek Elliston Michael Malcolm (12 May 1932 – 15 July 2023) was an English film critic and historian.

== Early life ==
Derek Elliston Michael Malcolm was born on 12 May 1932. He was the son of Douglas Malcolm (died 1967) and Dorothy Vera (died 1964; née Elliston-Taylor),

Malcolm was educated at Eton College and Merton College, Oxford. As a child, he expressed an interest in film, often going to the newsreel cinema on Victoria station.

== Career ==
Malcolm worked for several decades as a film critic for The Guardian, having previously been an amateur National Hunt jockey, where he had 13 victories, then an actor, and the paper's first horse racing correspondent. In 1977, he was a member of the jury at the 27th Berlin International Film Festival.

Malcolm defended the "video nasty" Nightmare (1981) during an obscenity trial and expressed disappointment over the ruling against the distributors. In the mid-1980s he was host of The Film Club on BBC2, which was dedicated to art house films, and was director of the London Film Festival for several years.

After leaving The Guardian in 2000, Malcolm published his final series of articles, The Century of Films, in which he discussed films he admired from his favourite directors from around the world. He became chief film critic for the Evening Standard, before being replaced in 2009 by novelist Andrew O'Hagan. He still contributed film reviews for the newspaper, but it emerged in July 2013 that his contribution to the title was to be reduced further.

In 2008, Malcolm was a member of the jury at the 30th Moscow International Film Festival.

Malcolm was president of the British Federation of Film Societies and the International Film Critics' Circle and the honorary president of the International Federation of Film Critics. In 2003, he published an autobiographical book, Family Secrets, which recounts how in 1917 his father shot his mother's lover dead, but was found not guilty of murder.

== Personal life ==
Malcolm was married to the journalist and author Sarah Gristwood from 1994 until his death.

== Death ==
Malcolm died from heart and lung failure at his home in Deal, Kent, on 15 July 2023, at the age of 91.
