= Ewan Morrison =

Scottish author and screenwriter (born 1968)

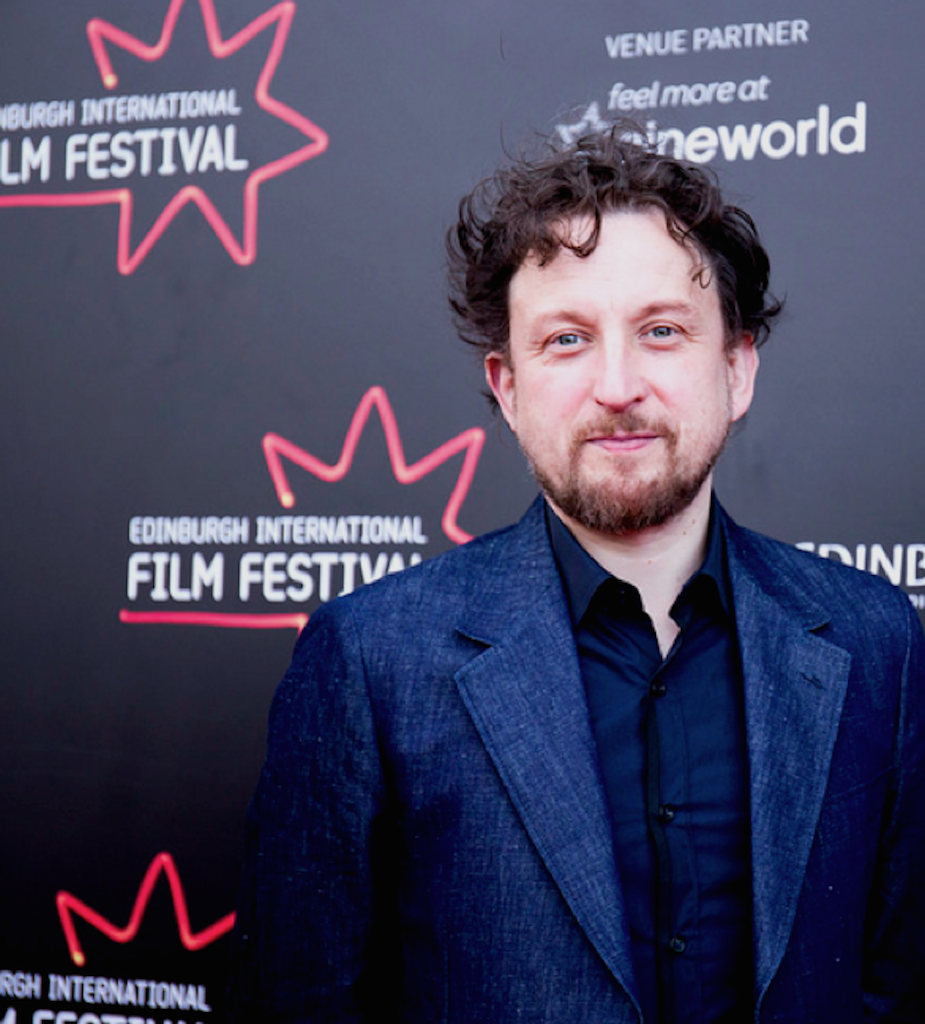
- Ewan Morrison attending the launch of Swung in 2016
- Born: 1968 (age 57–58); Wick, Scotland
- Education: Glasgow School of Art
- Awards: Saltire Society Literary Awards; Scottish Mortgage Investment Trust Book Awards; Glenfiddich Spirit of Scotland Awards; Not the Booker Prize
- Website: www.ewanmorrison.com

Ewan Morrison (born 1968) is a Scottish author, cultural critic, director, and screenwriter. He has published nine novels and a collection of short stories, as of 2025. His novel Nina X won the Saltire Society Literary Award for Fiction Book of the Year 2019. Irvine Welsh described Morrison as "the eminent fiction writer of our times" and Terry Gilliam described his 2025 novel For Emma as "absolutely wonderful".

== Career ==
=== Film and television ===
Morrison worked as a television and film writer and director from 1990 to 2004. In 1992, he wrote scripts in Angers, France for three months after winning the Pepinières Scholarship Pour Jeunes Artistes Européens. The Scottish Arts Council gave Morrison a Media Artists Award in 1994, allowing him to develop and direct several short films.

In 2000, Morrison was nominated for a BAFTA Scotland Award for Best Director (Television) and Best TV Production for I Saw You. I Saw You won the Royal Television Society Programme Awards for Best Regional Drama in 2001.

From 2003 to 2005, Morrison was a resident scriptwriter at Madstone Films in New York. However, after two years of work, his film project fell apart. His first feature film screenplay, Swung (2007), was an adaptation of his novel. Morrison was also a scriptwriter for Cold Call and Netflix's Outlaw King.

=== Cultural critic ===
Morrison regularly writes as a cultural commentator for newspapers, including The Guardian, The Scotsman, The Telegraph, and The Times. He is also a contributor to magazines such as Bella Caledonia, The Psychologist, Psychology Today, Quillette and the literary journal 3:AM Magazine.

At the Edinburgh International Book Festival in 2011, Morrison gave a talk where he predicted the end of print books in 25 years; a related article followed this in The Guardian. He wrote that it will be impossible for authors to continue to make a living writing books due to changes in sales models and the decline of advances from publishers. He has also written about the role of fan fiction in publishing and what he had dubbed the "self-epublishing bubble".

Morrison was originally a supporter of Scottish independence; however, he later publicly stated that he had changed his mind and voted for remaining in the United Kingdom.

Morrison says he uses writing to unravel the utopian/apocalyptic mindset that he was brought up with. In 2016, he gave a TEDx Talk on the history and consequences of utopian projects. He has also written articles about collectives and utopian projects. His writings on this topic range from "top 10 books about communes" to an article about cults for Psychology Today.

In a September 2014 article in The Guardian, Morrison said that young adult dystopian fiction serves as propaganda for "right-wing libertarianism". This piece "sent shockwaves through sci-fi fandom", resulting in responses from other writers and scholars.

=== Author ===
In 2005, Morrison received the Scottish Arts Council Writer's Bursary, a cash award that allows unpublished writers to devote time to writing. Published a year later in 2006, Morrison's first book, The Last Book You Read and Other Stories, is a short story collection that explores relationships in the era of globalisation. The Times said it was "the most compelling Scottish literary debut since Trainspotting". The Edinburgh Companion to Contemporary Scottish Literature says, "Undeniably Morrison's collection of short stories makes a contribution to contemporary world literature". However, Arena magazine responded by calling Morrison a "Scottish purveyor erudite filth". One of the stories from the collection was made into the short film None of the Above.

In 2006, Morrison received the UNESCO/Edinburgh City of Literature residency at Varuna, The Writer's House in Australia. That same year, he was a finalist for the 2006 Arena Magazine Man of the Year Literature Prize. New Statesman named Morrison to its list of "five young writers to watch" in March 2007.

Morrison's first novel, Swung (2007) was about a Glasgow yuppie couple who work for a television company and get involved with the swinging scene. The novel was adapted into a film in 2015, with Morrison writing the screenplay. Distance was Morrison's second novel. It explored phone sex, parenthood, and two people involved in a long-distance relationship. The Telegraph said, "[Morrison's] narrative voice is completely original. His prose feels utterly contemporary, with a smooth, readable texture." The Times called it "utterly compelling...Morrison is one of the finest novelists around". However, other reviewers found the book depressing; Jonathan Cape of The Scotsman noted, "A death would liven things up" and there is "too much verbiage [and] conversational psychotherapy."

Released in 2009, Morrison's third novel Ménage is about three dysfunctional artists living in a bisexual ménage à trois in 1990s London. Morrison based the novel on his experiences within the fashionable nihilistic circles of the British art scene after graduating from art school. The novel was inspired by the infamous ménage à trois between Henry Miller, his wife, and her lover.

His 2012 novel, Close Your Eyes, is about a woman who was brought up in a hippie commune in the 1960s and 1970s and returns 25 years later to search for the mother who abandoned her. Morrison has described the book as a partly autobiographical reaction to "coming to terms with a hippy childhood" and being raised by political extremists. Close Your Eyes won the Scottish Mortgage Investment Trust Book Awards Book of the Year Fiction Prize in 2013.

Morrison's Tales from the Mall (2012) is "a mash-up of fact, fiction, essays, and multi-format media that tells of the rise of the shopping mall". Tales from the Mall won Not the Booker Prize in 2012. It was shortlisted for the Saltire Society Book of the Year Award and the Creative Scotland Writer of the Year Award.

Morrison's seventh novel, Nina X, was published in 2019. Written as a journal, the novel is about a woman who was raised in a commune-cult without toys or books and escapes into the outside world. Nina X won the 2019 Saltire Society Literary Award for Fiction Book of the Year. It is currently in development as a movie by director David Mackenzie.

How to Survive Everything is Morrison's eighth novel and was published in 2021. This thriller, written in the style of a survival guide, is about a teenager who is abducted and taken to a bunker by her father who believes the world is ending. The novel was longlisted for Bloody Scotland's The McIlvanney Prize 2021. In 2022, the novel was optioned for a television series.

== Themes and style ==
Literary critic Stuart Kelly described Morrison as "the most fluent and intelligent writer of his generation here in Scotland". Professor of Scottish literature Marie-Odile Pittin-Hedon says that Morrison's fiction and essays explore the human condition within the globalized world, similar to the subjects of postmodern sociologist Zygmunt Bauman. In a summary written for the British Council, Garann Holcombe says:

In many ways, Morrison's work, like that of Michel Houellebecq, who is very much his literary forebear, is extremely frightening. It deals with illusion and distance; with everything we manufacture to move us from language, dialogue, contact, knowledge, love, ourselves...In his universe, we are naive participants in an endless narrative invention based on a palimpsest of lies, stories and half-truths—wanting colour, but with no interest in what that colour is made of.

Morrison's writing has been mistaken for that of a female writer, because of his convincing portrayal of "a woman's point of view about such topics as breastfeeding, depression and how it feels to abandon your child".

For Morrison's first five books, he practiced "experiential writing", putting himself into new and often extreme situations to find material for his novels, including becoming a swinger, a secret shopper, and a New Age convert. He admits, "All my characters are a bit of me but pushed to limits..."

== Awards ==
Year	Work	Award	Category	Result	Ref
2005	The Last Book You Read and Other Stories	Arena Magazine Man of the Year Award	Fiction	Won	
2012	—	Glenfiddich Spirit of Scotland Awards	Writer of the Year	Won	
2012	Tales from the Mall	Not the Booker Prize	—	Won	
2013	Close Your Eyes	Scottish Mortgage Investment Trust Book Awards	Fiction	Won	
2019	Nina X	Saltire Society Literary Award	Fiction	Won	

== Life ==
Morrison was born in Wick, Caithness, Scotland in 1968. His parents are singer Edna Morrison and the poet, painter, and librarian David Morrison. His father was a "literary figure of national significance" but was also an alcoholic. In interviews and essays, Morrison has talked about his unorthodox childhood in Caithness as a "hippie experiment".

Morrison attended Pulteneytown Academy and Wick High School. He was bullied by other children because he grew up as a cultural outsider and had a stutter.

As a teenager, Morrison enjoyed making figures from modeling clay and decided to attend art school. He attended Glasgow School of Art where he experimented with portrait painting and photography under Thomas Joshua Cooper before discovering documentary film making. He graduated in 1990 with a first-class degree in art documentaries and also won the dissertation prize.

Morrison has been a member of several organisations he later described as cults, the Socialist Workers Party, an organisation related to Tvind, and a New Age group.

== Personal life ==
As an adult, Morrison learned to manage his stutter. He married and had two children. After a film project he had worked on for two years in New York fell apart in 2005, Morrison says he "cracked up" and turned to "dangerous, alcohol-fuelled behaviour". He lost his home and his marriage ended in divorce.

He is now married to Emily Ballou, an Australian-American poet whom he met in 2006. The couple lives in Glasgow. They have collaborated on several screenwriting projects.

== Works ==
=== Film and television ===
- Closet (1994), director
- Blue Christmas (1994), director
- The Contract (1995), director and screenplay
- The Proposal (1998), director and producer
- I Saw You (2000), director
- The Lovers (2000), director
- American Blackout (2013), screenplay co-written with Emily Ballou
- Swung (Sigma Films, 2015), screenplay
- None of the Above (2018), screenplay

=== Novels ===
- —— (2007). Swung. Jonathan Cape. ISBN 9780224078764.
- —— (2008). Distance. Jonathan Cape. ISBN 978-0224082372.
- —— (2009). Ménage. Jonathan Cape. ISBN 978-0224084406.
- —— (2012). Tales from the Mall. Cargo. ISBN 978-0956308375.
- —— (2012). Close Your Eyes. Jonathan Cape. ISBN 978-0224096232.
- —— (2019). Nina X. Fleet. ISBN 978-0708899021.
- —— (2021). How to Survive Everything. Contraband. ISBN 978-1913393151.
- —— (2025). For Emma. Leamington. ISBN 9781914090950.

=== Short story collection ===
- —— (2005). The Last Book You Read and Other Stories. Chroma. ISBN 1845020480.
- —— (2026). Shadowspheres (w/Chris Kelso). Merigold Independant. ISBN 9798295414497.

=== Articles ===
- "Dead Malls On Living Land"". Bella Caledonia (3 July 2012)
- "Coming to Terms with a Hippy Childhood". The Times. (12 September 2012).
- "Scottish Literature: Over the Borderline". The Guardian (11 September 2013)
- "YA Dystopias Teach Children to Submit to the Free Market, Not Fight Authority". The Guardian (1 September 2014)
- "How Did Three Generations of My Family Fall into Cults?" The Telegraph (6 May 2019)
- "12 Signs That Someone May Be Involved With a Cult". Psychology Today (29 March 2023)
