= How to Survive Everything =

2021 novel by Ewan Morrison

- Author: Ewan Morrison
- Language: English
- Genre: Speculative fiction
- Published: 2021 (Saraband); 2022 (Harper Perennial)
- Publication date: March 1, 2021
- Publication place: Scotland
- Pages: 357
- ISBN: 9781913393151

How to Survive Everything is a 2021 speculative fiction novel by Ewan Morrison. It was longlisted for the 2021 McIlvanney Prize for Scottish Crime Book of the Year.

== Plot ==
Ben and Haley are brother and sister and the children of a paranoid doomsday prepper, Ed. Upon hearing of the possibility of an upcoming pandemic, their father forces them to accompany him to a remote piece of land to ride out the future disaster along with several of his followers.

== Reception ==
Allan Massie praised Morrison for avoiding issues common in other dystopian novels such as poor characterization and noted Haley's sense of humor. The Herald noted the book's careful handling of its themes. Stuart Kelly wrote positively in The Spectator about the novel's plot and praised Morrison for humanizing doomsday preppers. By contrast, Ben H. Winters panned the book in The New York Times, criticizing Morrison's narrative structure and describing the dialogue as "clumsy and forced."

== Awards and nominations ==
- Longlisted for the 2021 McIlvanney Prize for Scottish Crime Book of the Year
