= Our Endless Numbered Days (novel) =

Novel by Claire Fuller

- Author: Claire Fuller
- Publisher: Tin House Books
- Publication date: March 17, 2015
- ISBN: 9781941040010

Our Endless Numbered Days is the debut novel by British author Claire Fuller, published March 17, 2015 by Tin House Books. The book won the 2015 Desmond Elliott Prize.

== Reception ==
Our Endless Numbered Days won the 2015 Desmond Elliott Prize.

The book received a starred review from Library Journal, as well as positive reviews from Shelf Awareness, Publishers Weekly, and Kirkus Reviews.

Kirkus wrote, "Fuller’s compelling coming-of-age story, narrated from the perspective of Peggy’s return to civilization, is delivered in translucent prose. Although attuned readers will likely have foreseen the final revelations, this is memorable first work from a talent to watch."

Writing for Shelf Awareness, Jen Forbus noted, "Our Endless Numbered Days is sure to leave readers gloriously disquieted. The perspective of a young, naïve narrator creates both an uncertainty in her reliability and empathy for her helplessness. The unsettling plot twists infuse the story with rich psychological suspense. Through them, Fuller strikes horror, but she also raises hope. This surprisingly satisfying dichotomy will survive in readers' hearts and minds long after the fate of Peggy and James has been revealed."

Publishers Weekly stated that Our Endless Numbered Days "has the winning combination of an unreliable narrator and a shocking ending."
