= I, Medusa =

2025 adult fantasy novel by Ayana Gray

- Author: Ayana Gray
- Cover artist: Greg Mollica
- Language: English
- Genre: Historical fantasy; Greek mythology
- Published: November 18, 2025
- Publisher: Random House
- Publication place: United States
- Pages: 336 pp (Hardcover)
- ISBN: 9780593733769

I, Medusa is the 2025 adult historical fantasy novel by American author Ayana Gray, published by Random House on November 18, 2025. It reimagines the Greek myth of Medusa as a young Black woman who is caught in the crosshairs of rivaling gods.

I, Medusa debuted at number 13 on the New York Times bestseller list, number 19 on the USA Today bestseller list, and number 12 on the Indie bestseller list. The audiobook was narrated by Tyla Collier and A'rese Emokpae.

== Background ==
In October 2024, it was announced that Random House acquired the North American rights to publish I, Medusa.

People magazine released the cover artwork exclusively to their website on March 27, 2025. Gray shared, "Medusa is an iconic but often one-dimensional figure in classical Greco-Roman mythology. She is often portrayed as a villain, but I've learned the best villains never think of themselves that way and wanted to explore that. I was inspired to write a story that forces readers to decide for themselves whether she truly deserves to be called a monster."

The idea for the novel germinated in 2022 via a TikTok comment, where an individual stated Gray's locs resembled snakes. This automatically conjured the imagery of Medusa, and Gray wondered what it would be like if the villain was a young Black woman. In addition, classical literature didn't supply much about Medusa's backstory, which gave the opportunity to be creative. The partial first draft was done in 2023, and fully completed by January 2025.

== Critical reception ==
Juliana Newsom of Library Journal compared it to Pat Barker's The Silence of the Girls (2018) and Natalie Haynes's Stone Blind (2022) for its center on a woman protagonist and "grim take on Greek mythology." Kirkus Reviews was less sanguine in their assessment, opining that while the narration was "engaging" and "imaginative," the lack of subtlety hindered it. Publishers Weekly penned, "In focusing on the young Medusa's coming-of-age in a toxic environment and the assault that redefines her life, Gray emphasizes the tragic aspects of the original myth and the pervasiveness of rape culture. Both empowering and infuriating, it's a strong take on the classic character."
