= The Memory Librarian: And Other Stories of Dirty Computer =

2022 science fiction collection by Janelle Monáe

- Author: Janelle Monáe with Yohanca Delgado; Eve L. Ewing; Alaya Dawn Johnson; Danny Lore; Sheree Renée Thomas
- Language: English
- Genre: Afrofuturism; dystopian fiction; science fiction
- Publisher: Harper Voyager
- Publication date: 14 Apr 2022
- Publication place: United States
- Pages: 321 (Hardcover)

The Memory Librarian: And Other Stories of Dirty Computer is a collection of short fiction by Janelle Monáe, written in collaboration with Yohanca Delgado, Eve L. Ewing, Alaya Dawn Johnson, Danny Lore, and Sheree Renée Thomas. The collection, which has been described as Afrofuturist and cyberpunk, is Monáe's debut literary work. It is based on the world of her (Note: Monáe uses both she/her and they/them pronouns. This article uses she/her for consistency.) 2018 album Dirty Computer, as well as the accompanying short film of the same name. The book has received critical acclaim.

== Plot ==
=== The Memory Librarian ===
with Alaya Dawn Johnson

Seshet is a queer Black woman working for New Dawn as the titular memory librarian. She works to enforce New Dawn’s rules by deleting and manipulating the population’s memories, though she turns a blind eye to some rebel groups that she considers harmless. New Dawn’s memory collection system becomes clogged up, and Seshet investigates. She learns that her lover Alethia is a rebel who mixed chemicals to combat New Dawn’s weapons. Seshet begins to question her place in the system of the New Dawn.

=== Nevermind ===
with Danny Lore

After escaping from New Dawn, Jane 57821 lives at the Pynk Hotel with several other people, including her friend Neer. Pynk is a haven for women and women-aligned people looking to escape from New Dawn’s totalitarianism. The hotel is betrayed by Rhapsody, a resident who does not want non-binary residents such as Neer to live at the hotel. New Dawn attacks, but the residents fight them off.

=== Timebox ===
with Eve L. Ewing

Raven and Akilah are two women from very different backgrounds who get their first apartment together. Raven is a nursing student who never has enough time; Akilah is an artist and activist. They discover that the closet in their apartment is outside of time and debate how best to use this power. Akilah wants to make time a community resource to end capitalism, while Raven initially wants to use it herself. The apartment manager locks Akilah in the closet and leaves Raven alone.

=== Save Changes ===
with Yohanca Delgado

Sisters Amber and Larry care for their disabled mother Diana. Diana is under house arrest by New Dawn and exhibits erratic behavior after a failed memory wipe. Amber has a piece of larimar stone, which she can use to rewind time in case of an emergency. However, the stone can only be used once. Larry dates a woman named Natalie in defiance of New Dawn’s rules. Amber and Larry attend an illegal party. Larry is arrested. Diana reveals that she has been faking her behavioral issues for years. Amber activates the stone. Returning to the beginning of the story, Amber, Larry, and Diana escape to join the resistance against New Dawn.

=== Timebox Altar(ed) ===
with Sheree Renée Thomas

Bug is a 7-year old child living near Freewheel, a ghost town where New Dawn’s control is weak. Bug’s parents are dirty computers who have been taken by New Dawn. While playing in the abandoned town, Bug and their friends make art from the trash, creating a sculpture that Bug calls an ark. They meet an old woman named Mx. Tangee. She calls their creation an altar. When each child sits in the ark’s altar, they are transported to a possible future, where they learn more about themselves before returning to the present. New Dawn drones arrive to arrest Mx. Tangee, but she disappears into the ark.

== Major themes ==
In a review for Grimdark Magazine, John Mauro wrote that the collection addresses issues including homophobia, racism, and feminism as the "neofascist, technocratic New Dawn regime" specifically targets members of the queer Black community.

The collection imagines a future in which memories can be controlled or erased, exploring themes of truth and censorship. In a review for The Advocate, Jeffrey Masters wrote that the book was "prescient" in light of current events. Texas had recently passed a law restricting the teaching of certain "controversial" topics in public schools, and various school districts had asked educators to teach "both sides" of atrocities such as the Holocaust. Masters believes that Monáe had "taken note" of the way in which politicians were trying to "erase our memories" and had explored this concept in her work. Monáe also discussed how opposition to critical race theory and Florida's controversial anti-LGBTQ bill inspired her protagonists. All of the protagonists are from marginalized communities, fighting to "be seen in a nation's larger story."

In a review for Los Angeles Review of Books, Dan Hassler-Forest wrote that the title story of The Memory Librarian is a "play on Philip K. Dick’s thematic obsession with anxieties about the reliability of memories." In addition, Monáe's exploration of race and sexuality as "markers of social deviance" are a method to explore the way in which technology reinforces existing social hierarchies. While works such as Nineteen Eighty-Four and Black Mirror have explored surveillance in the context of political power, Hassler-Forest writes that The Memory Librarian differs in that the technology is "emphatically racialized". This is similar to Ruha Benjamin's theory of the "New Jim Code" in which surveillance technology is used to "reinforce rigorous policing as the continuation of centuries-old racial segregation". In a review for Wired, Mary Retta wrote that The Memory Librarian explores the way in which white people have controlled the "individual and collective memories" of Black Americans. For example, enslaved people arriving in America were forced to change their names, lose their native languages, and their families were torn apart.

The story Nevermind explores the depths of inclusion. Despite its status as a feminist collective, the Pynk Hotel still faces internal tensions as the cisgender members of the community debate whether or not the transgender members deserve to have equal rights. Alex Brown wrote that the members of the Pynk Hotel are divided between "TERFs and everybody else". Brown also wrote that the conflicts at Pynk are a reflection of the way that "queer people police and gatekeep queerness".

A review in Lightspeed Magazine examined how the stories use art as a "means of self-expression and a weapon to fight back against oppression". This is "meta-contextual" because the work is derived from both a music album and a film.

A review in USA Today wrote that the title story examines how technology can "reinforce harmful biases". Seshet is a Black woman who is uncomfortable with her own appearance. Her virtual assistant Dee reflects Eurocentric beauty norms.

== Style ==
"The Memory Librarian" and "Nevermind" are novella-length works. The remaining three works are short stories. Each of the five stories was written by Monáe and a different coauthor.

The stories reference Monáe's previous work; the characters Jane, Zen, and Che appear in both the Dirty Computer film and the story "Nevermind." The music video for "Pynk" is set at the same hotel as the story.

There are references to the work of Prince scattered throughout the collection, including the fact that one of Prince's alter egos is called Nevermind.

== Background ==
Monáe was inspired by Ray Kurzweil's 2005 book The Singularity Is Near with regards to the concept of merging humanity and machines. She also credits the 1927 film Metropolis for her vision of her "artistry serving the world".

== Reception ==
The collection received critical acclaim. In a starred review, Publishers Weekly called the book a "knockout" and a "moving, triumphant collection". The review felt that the title story and "Nevermind" were the most impressive stories in the collection, calling them "odes to queer Afrofuturism". A starred review in Library Journal wrote that the book speaks to the science fiction "tradition of mind-control tyranny" and recommended it for fans of Afrofuturist authors such as Octavia Butler, Nnedi Okorafor, N. K. Jemisin, and Nalo Hopkinson. Mary Retta of Wired wrote that Monáe is "one of [Octavia] Butler’s most vital successors" and praised her work as an Afrofuturist icon.

Alex Brown wrote that Monáe and her co-authors have produced a "vivid, visceral" book that explores complicated questions of diversity. Kirkus Reviews called the work a "clever adaptation of music to a new form" and praised the work as "emotionally raw and with a whole-hearted love for people".

In a review for Grimdark Magazine, John Mauro praised the work's "consistent tone [and] style" despite the large number of collaborators and write that Monáe's voice "shines vibrantly" through the entire collection. A review from the Washington Post praised the "varied voices" of the collaborators, writing that the different tones "play into the book's concept" to paint a larger picture of New Dawn. A review in USA Today gave the collection 3.5 of 4 stars, writing that it "expands on the themes of identity and social justice" from Monáe's 2018 album.

A review in Los Angeles Review of Books stated that the work would be especially enjoyed by young adults "marked as Dirty Computers", offering "hope for a better tomorrow". A review Lightspeed Magazine praised the work's "undercurrent of hope" despite the dystopian setting.

In a review for Tor.com, Mahvesh Murad praised the inclusivity and diversity of the book's characters, as well as the variety of complex themes explored in the stories. He wrote that "some questions" remain about the worldbuilding regarding New Dawn, noting it as a chance for "further development" of the mythology. In a negative review of the work, Stephen Kearse of the New York Times criticized the "flimsy" storytelling, writing that it is never clear if New Dawn is a "government, a company, or a religious group". The review did praise the story Timebox for avoiding the "shaky worldbuilding" and focusing on a small-scale conflict.
