= British Federation of Film Societies =

Cinema For All
- Formation: 1946
- Legal status: Non-profit organisation
- Purpose: Advice and support for film societies in the UK
- Location: 15 Paternoster Row, The Workstation, Sheffield
- Region served: UK
- Members: UK film societies and community cinemas
- President: Derek Malcolm
- Affiliations: British Film Institute, International Federation of Film Societies
- Website: Cinema For All
- Formerly called: British Federation of Film Societies

The British Federation of Film Societies (BFFS), which has used the trading name Cinema For All since 2014, is the national organisation for the development and support of the film society and community cinema movement in the United Kingdom.

== History ==
The British Federation of Film Societies was founded in 1932; its inaugural meeting was held at Welwyn and attended by Anthony Asquith and John Grierson. The federation was then based in London; early members of the executive included Ellen Wilkinson.

== Activities ==
The organisation offers a wide range of services and resources dedicated to the needs of community cinemas and is based in The Workstation, in Sheffield's Cultural Industries Quarter. The president is Derek Malcolm and the patron is Ken Loach.

It has held the Film Society of the Year Awards annually since 1969. The 2014 Engholm Prize winner for the Film Society of the Year is Dungannon Film Club in Northern Ireland.

== See also ==
- Edinburgh Film Guild
