= All Girls =

2021 novel by Emily Layden

- First edition cover
- Author: Emily Layden
- Language: English
- Genre: Fiction
- Publication date: 2021
- Publication place: United States

All Girls is the debut novel by Emily Layden. It was published by St. Martin's Press on February 16, 2021, and received mixed reviews upon release.

== Plot ==
Atwater, an all-girls boarding school in Connecticut, deals with a sexual assault lawsuit from an alumna who was raped by a teacher two decades ago.

== Development ==
=== Publication history ===
The novel was published by St. Martin's Press in the United States and was released on February 16, 2021.

== Reception ==
All Girls received mixed reviews upon release. Kate Elizabeth Russell, writing in The New York Times, said that the novel eschewed thriller tropes by focusing more on the school's institutional drama and complimented the variety of perspectives on the school's culture. Russell went on to say that, while she enjoyed the book's characterizations, she felt the book's message would have been more prescient had it been set post-MeToo. Marion Winik wrote in The Washington Post that the book seemed "more sociological than novelistic" and criticized the prose for its unsubtly, saying that "it seems unlikely that anyone will miss the point" of the novel. The Guardian was more positive, describing the book "an incisive portrait of young women." Kirkus Reviews described the book as being "intelligent, evocative, and empathetic." Publishers Weekly complimented the book's broad overview of boarding school culture but criticizing the short narratives for not allowing character development.
