= Wick High School =

Location
- Newton Road; Wick; Scotland; 58.4380°N 3.0982°W

Information
- Type: State high school
- Motto: Learning - Ambition - Respect
- Established: 1910
- Founder: Highland Council
- School district: The Highland Council
- Rector: S Sandecki
- Enrollment: 760
- Campus: Wick Community Campus
- Houses: Fergus, Morven, Noss, Rumster, and Scaraben
- Colors: Black, gold, and blue
- Mascot: Raven
- Website: www.wick.highland.sch.uk

Wick High School is a secondary school in Wick, Scotland, under the control of The Highland Council. In September 2008 it had an enrolment of 838. Being one of only two secondary schools in Caithness, it takes in pupils from a large number of primary schools.

== History ==
Wick High School was built in 1910. It was originally only one building looking out onto West Banks Avenue. This building used to be in use but it shut on Tuesday 4 April 2017, and four extensions were added during the 1960s to cope with the increase in enrolment.

== Intake ==
Wick High School takes in pupils from eleven primary schools: Dunbeath, Lybster, Thrumster, Noss (Wick), Newton Park (Wick), Watten, Keiss, Bower, and Canisbay. In 2008 there was an enrolment of 838, and the rector was Alistair Traill.

In May 2012 the Herald conducted a survey of all of Scotland's secondary schools. The survey gave a percentage of how many senior pupils had achieved five Highers or more in their tenure at the school, and a percentage of how many pupils received free school meals. In a list of Highland Schools, Wick came 21st out of 30 with 5% of senior pupils having achieved five Highers or more. This is 5% behind both the Highland average and the Scottish average of 10%. Wick came 3rd out of 30 when it came to free school meals, scoring 15.6%, both ahead of the Highland average of 9.6%, and the Scottish average of 12.7%.

== Notable alumni ==
- Colin Boyd, Baron Boyd of Duncansby, Lord Advocate of Scotland
- Ewan Morrison, writer and film director
- Dr Alfred Ritchie FRSE (1894–1979) marine zoologist
