= Pin Drop Studio =

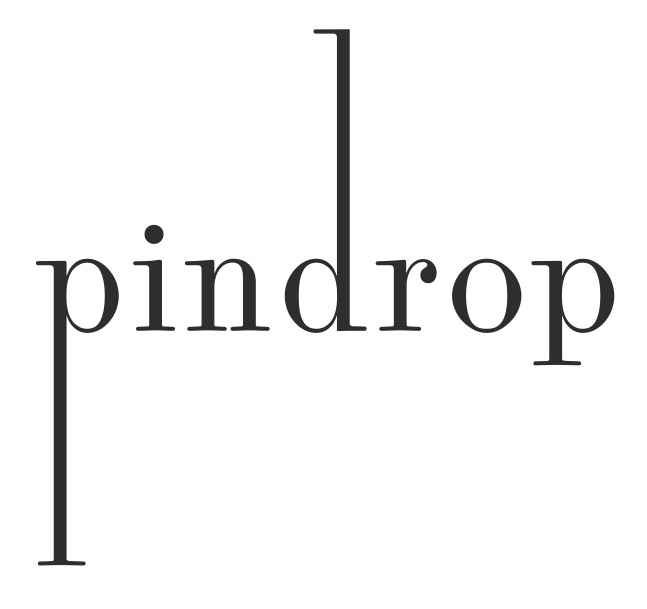
- Industry: Arts & Entertainment
- Founded: 2012
- Founder: Simon Oldfield & Elizabeth Day
- Headquarters: London, United Kingdom
- Area served: Worldwide
- Products: Books, podcasts, live events and adaptation
- Brands: Pin Drop Productions, Pin Drop Podcasts, A Short Affair, Pin Drop Live

Pin Drop Studio is an arts and entertainment studio founded in 2012 by Simon Oldfield and Elizabeth Day, with a particular focus on short fiction.

Pin Drop Studio publishes short fiction, staged an annual short story award for new writing in association with the Royal Academy of Arts (from 2015-2018), has a podcast series and has hosted events in the UK and USA.

== Books ==
A Short Affair is an anthology of original short fiction from Pin Drop Studio, published in hard-back in July 2018 by Scribner, an imprint of Simon & Schuster, and edited by Simon Oldfield. The book contains eighteen original short stories by best-selling authors alongside new writers from the annual Pin Drop Short Story Award, with a foreword by Tim Marlow. The cover design is by White Cube artist Eddie Peake.

== Pin Drop Short Story Award ==
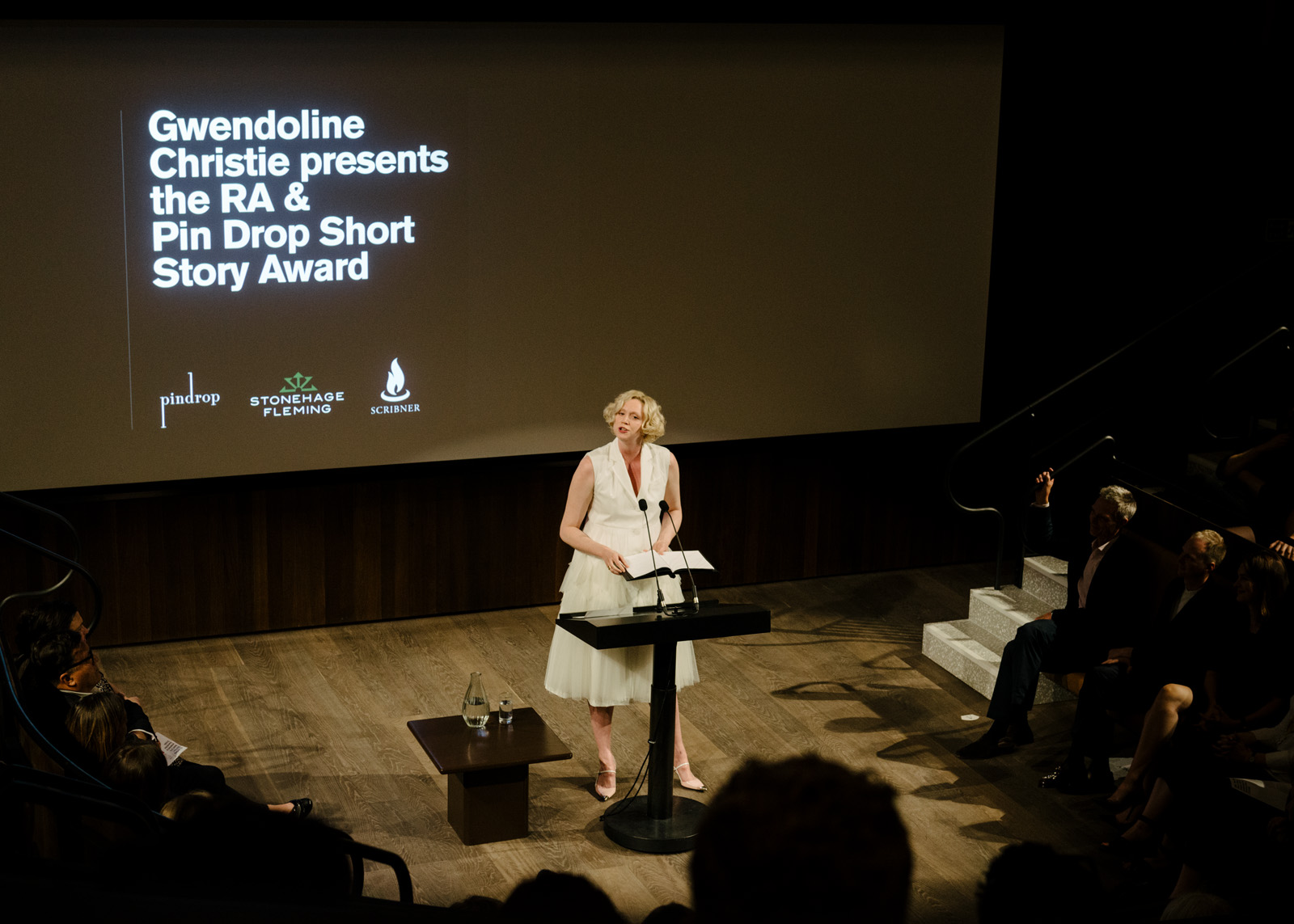
Actor, Gwendoline Christie, reading the 2018 winning story from the Pin Drop Short Story Award at the Royal Academy

The Pin Drop Short Story Award was an annual writing prize for new original short stories, held from 2015-2018. Regular judges of the award included the artistic director of the Royal Academy, Tim Marlow, along with the Pin Drop founders, Simon Oldfield and Elizabeth Day. The winning story was presented each year at a ceremony at the Royal Academy, where it is read to an audience by a notable actor.

Award winners:

2015 - Bethan Roberts won with story, "Ms. Featherstone and the Beast", read by Stephen Fry.

2016 - Claire Fuller won with story, "A Quiet Tidy Man", read by British actress Juliet Stevenson.

2017 - Cherise Saywell won with story, "Morelia Spilota", read by British actress and Downton Abbey star Dame Penelope Wilton.

2018 - Sophie Ward won with story, "Sunbed", read British actress and Game of Thrones star Gwendoline Christie.

Pin Drop Podcasts is a series of audio recordings of original short fiction and interviews with authors and actors.

== Pin Drop Live ==
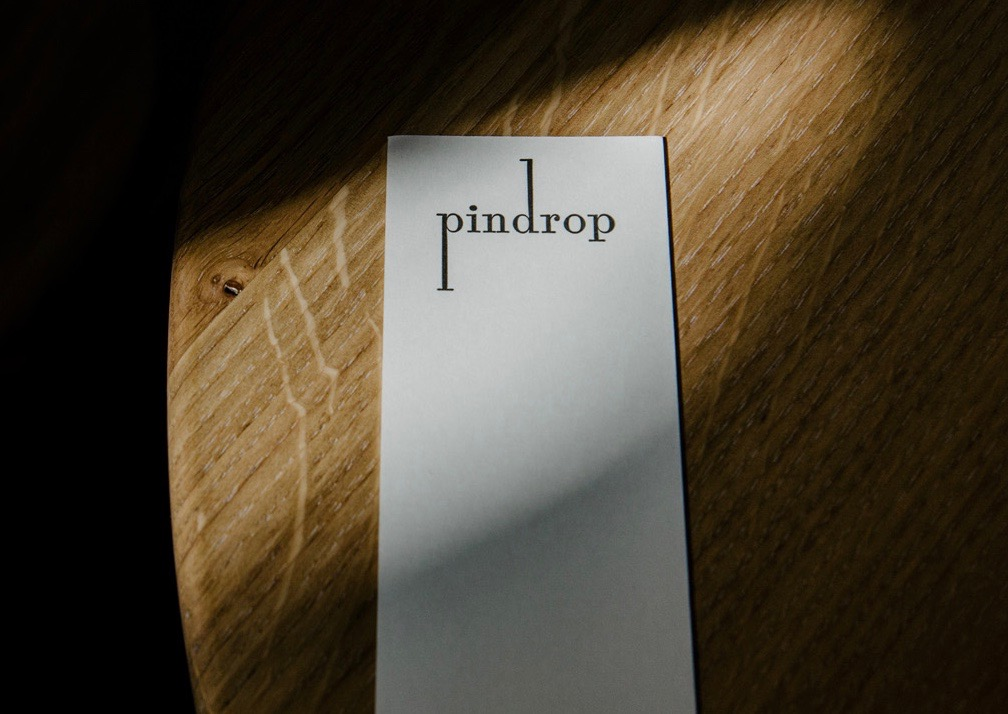
Pin Drop Studio bookmark given away to fans

Pin Drop Live stages events at venues such as the Royal Academy, Hauser & Wirth Somerset and Soho House in London, New York, Los Angeles, and other cities. Typically an original story is read to an audience by an author or actor, followed by an interview.

Guest readers have included, Stephen Fry, Ben Okri, Russell Tovey, Juliet Stevenson, Sebastian Faulks, William Boyd, Julian Barnes, Richard Dawkins, Princess Julia, Selma Blair, A.L.Kennedy, Dame Sian Phillips, Dame Eileen Atkins, Dame Penelope Wilton, Tom Rob Smith, Peter Blake, Gwendoline Christie, Will Self, Maura Tierney, Graham Swift, Sue Tilley, Molly Parkin, Tuppence Middleton, David Nicholls, Ed Stoppard, and Curtis Sittenfeld.
