= Outlawed (novel) =

2021 novel by Anna North

- First edition hardcover of Outlawed by Anna North
- Author: Anna North
- Language: English
- Publisher: Bloomsbury Publishing
- Publication date: 2021
- Publication place: United States
- Pages: 261
- ISBN: 978-1-63557-542-2
- OCLC: 1151062688
- Dewey Decimal: 813/.6
- LC Class: PS3614.O774 O88 2021

Outlawed is a 2021 feminist western novel by American writer Anna North.

== Plot ==
The novel takes place in an alternate timeline where the United States experienced a devastating flu pandemic in the 1830s. Among other implications, this pandemic resulted in strict fertility laws.

The main character, Ada, is a teenager who gets married young but is unable to conceive a child. After she is forced to leave her hometown and family, she is faced with what to do next. She joins a convent and later a gang of other people who experienced infertility, homophobia, and transphobia.

== Themes ==
The book has themes of infertility, mental health, feminism, queerness, gender, sexuality, adventure, and healthcare. The book bridges many genres including western, historical, alternate history, feminist, LGBT+, and dystopian literature.

== Development and writing ==
Outlawed is North's second novel. North read books such as Nell Painter's Exodusters to better understand the real-world history of the West before writing the novel.

== Reception ==
The novel received mostly positive reviews. Maureen Corrigan, writing for NPR, praised the book as a "[...] smart adventure tale". Kirkus Reviews gave credit to the novel for "[...earning] its place in the growing canon of fiction that subverts the Western genre [...]". It was also a New York Times best seller.

== Television adaptation ==
On January 26, 2021, it was announced that Outlawed would be adapted for television by A24 and Amy Adams' Bond Group Entertainment.
