= Why We Kneel, How We Rise =

Book on causes and effects of racism in sports

- Subject: Racism
- Genre: Non-fiction

Why We Kneel, How We Rise is a book written by Michael Holding. The book covers the causes and effects of racism in sports on players and communities. The book was written in the aftermath of murder of George Floyd. It was published on 24 June 2021.

Contributors also shared their experiences including Usain Bolt, Thierry Henry, and Naomi Osaka.

== Reception ==
The book has been reviewed by The Times.

In December 2021, the book received the William Hill Sports Book of the Year award.

== Award ==
- William Hill Sports Book of the Year (2021)
