= Anna North =

American writer, editor and reporter

- Born: Williamsburg, Virginia, U.S.
- Occupations: Reporter; writer; editor

Anna North is an American writer, editor, and reporter who is currently a senior reporter at Vox specializing in covering gender-related issues.

== Life ==
Anna North grew up in Los Angeles, and currently lives in Brooklyn, New York.

Before entering writing as a full-time profession, she critiqued films in California for a small newspaper. She graduated from the Iowa Writers' Workshop at the University of Iowa.

== Career ==
She was a regular contributor and member of the editorial board at The New York Times from 2014 to 2017, and headed the segment "This Week In Hate."

She has written or edited for publications including Jezebel, BuzzFeed, and Salon.

Her fiction and nonfiction work has been published in the San Francisco Chronicle, Glimmer Train, and The Atlantic. She authored two fiction books, America Pacifica (2011), and The Life and Death of Sophie Stark (2015), which won a Lambda Literary Award.

She wrote about Donald Trump during his presidential campaign when she was an editor at The New York Times, regarding what she alleged was his "desire to be liked at all costs."

Her 2020 novel, Outlawed, was described by NPR commentator Maureen Corrigan as "The Handmaid's Tale meets Butch Cassidy and the Sundance Kid." Using tropes of the western, the novel weaves a tale of an alternative United States during a flu epidemic in 1894. The central character, the "outlaw" Ada, and her gang explore shifting roles of gender, and challenge the belief that childless women are freaks or witches.
