= Nadia Owusu =

Ghanaian-American author

Nadia Adjoa Owusu (born February 23, 1981) is an American writer and memoirist. She won a 2019 Whiting Award for her memoir Aftershocks.

She graduated from Pace University, Hunter College, and Mountainview College.

In December 2017, her essay So Devilish a Fire was one of three TAR Chapbook Winners by The Atlas Review (TAR), a literary magazine that judged submissions anonymously. The essay was published as a chapbook by TAR in 2017.

== Personal life ==
Nadia Owusu was born on February 23, 1981, in Dar es Salaam, Tanzania. Her parents are Almas Janikian and the late Osei Owusu. Almas' family are Armenian Americans; her maternal grandparents had fled Turkey during the Armenian genocide, eventually settling in Watertown, Massachusetts. Owusu's father was from southern Ghana and part of the Ashanti tribe. Since Owusu's father worked for the United Nations, she moved a lot as a child; living in London England), Rome (Italy), Addis Ababa (Ethiopia), Kampala (Uganda), Kumasi (Ghana) and Dar es Salaam (Tanzania). Owusu has lived in New York since she was 18.

== Works ==
- Aftershocks - A Memoir, New York, Simon & Schuster, 2020, ISBN 9781982111229.
- So Devilish a Fire, New York, TAR Chapbook series, 2017, OCLC 1081043040.
