= Meg Mason =

New Zealand author

- Occupations: Journalist; novelist
- Writing career
- Notable works: Sorrow and Bliss
- Website: megmason.com

Meg Mason is a New Zealand-born author and journalist. Her 2020 novel Sorrow and Bliss was the British Book Awards' 2022 Fiction Book of the Year. She published Sophie, Standing There in 2026.

== Early life and education ==
Meg Mason grew up in a religious sect in Foxton, New Zealand. She later moved to Palmerston North, and then to Sydney, Australia, at the age of 16.

== Career ==
Mason lived in the United Kingdom for five years, during which time she wrote for the Financial Times and The Times, before moving back to Sydney and starting a career as a freelance journalist. She has written for a number of magazines, including Vogue, Elle, and GQ.

She published her first book Say It Again in a Nice Voice in 2012 and her first novel You Be Mother in 2017.

Sorrow and Bliss is Mason's third book and the first to be released in the UK. It was the British Book Awards' 2022 Fiction Book of the Year. It was also shortlisted for the Australian Book Industry Awards' Fiction Book of the Year in 2021 and the Women's Prize for Fiction in 2022, and was nominated for the Ockham Award. About a woman whose marriage is breaking down, It has been labelled as "sad girl fiction", which Mason rejects as "incredibly pejorative". Amber Gwynne, a writing lecturer at the University of Queensland, called the story "undeniably dark but famously funny". Film and television rights for Sorrow and Bliss were sold to New Regency.

In her 2026 novel Sophie, Standing There, the protagonist, who works for a literary festival, becomes obsessed with a well-known writer. Mason created the "naturally cheerful" character of Sophie as a reaction to the labelling of her previous novel as "sad girl fiction".

== Personal life ==
As of 2021 Mason was living in Sydney with her husband and two daughters.

== Bibliography ==
Year	Title	Publisher	ISBN	Genre
2012	Say It Again in a Nice Voice	HarperCollins	978-0-7322-9352-9	Memoir
2017	You Be Mother	Fourth Estate	978-0-7322-9353-6	Novel
2020	Sorrow and Bliss	Fourth Estate	978-1-4607-5722-2	Novel
2026	Sophie, Standing There	Fourth Estate	978-1-4607-6066-6	Novel

== Awards ==
Year	Nominated work	Award	Category	Result	Ref.
2021	Sorrow and Bliss	Australian Book Industry Awards	Fiction Book of the Year	Shortlist	
2022	Sorrow and Bliss	Women's Prize for Fiction	—	Shortlist	
2022	Sorrow and Bliss	British Book Awards	Fiction Book of the Year	Winner	
