= Jesús Hilario Tundidor =

Spanish poet (1935–2021)

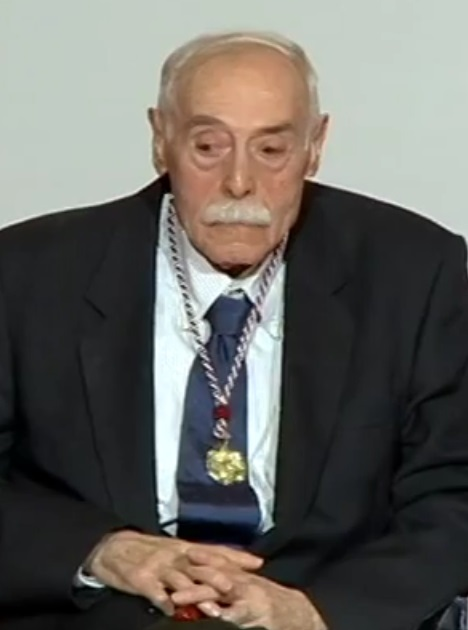
Jesús Hilario Tundidor, 2014

Jesús Hilario Tundidor (22 June 1935 – 2 May 2021) was a Spanish poet.

== Awards and honors ==
Premio Castilla y León de las Letras (2013, received in 2014)
