= Alaya Dawn Johnson =

American writer of speculative fiction

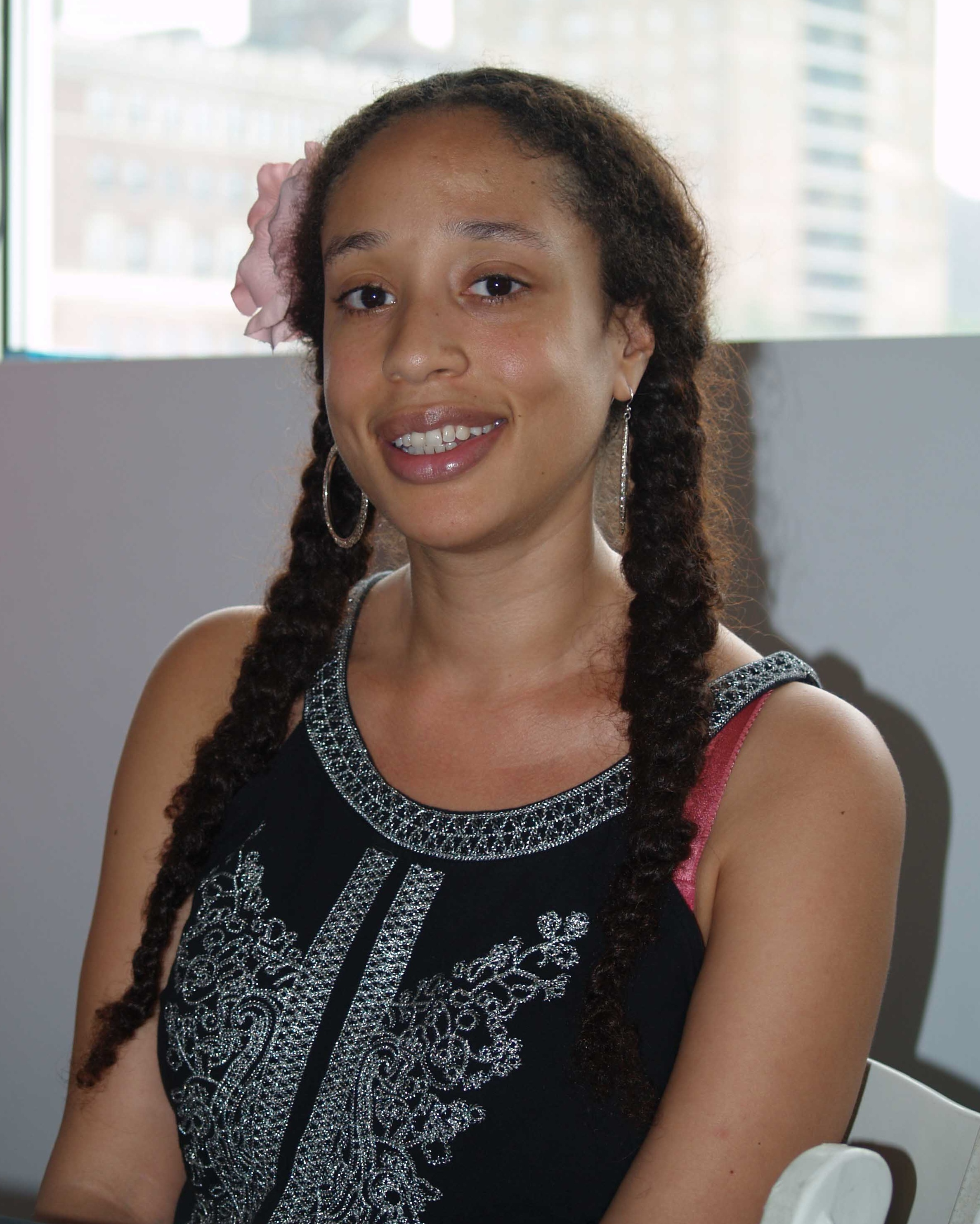
- Johnson in 2013
- Born: 1982 (age 43–44); Washington, D.C., U.S.
- Education: Columbia University (BA)
- Occupation: Writer
- Writing career
- Period: 2007–present
- Genres: Science fiction, fantasy, Solarpunk
- Notable works: The Summer Prince; The Spirit Binders
- Website: alayadawnjohnson.com

Alaya Dawn Johnson (born 1982) (/əˈlaɪə/) is an American writer of speculative fiction.

== Early life and education ==
Johnson was born in Washington, D.C. She graduated from Columbia University in 2004 with a Bachelor of Arts in East Asian Languages and Cultures.

Johnson lived in New York City until 2014, when she moved to Mexico City. She received a master's degree in Mesoamerican studies from the Universidad Nacional Autónoma de México for her thesis on fermented food and its ritual symbolism in pre-Columbian Mexico.

== Career ==
Apart from short fiction, Johnson has published two urban fantasy novels about "vampire suffragette" Zephyr Hollis set in an alternate 1920s New York City, and two novels set on islands resembling pre-modern Polynesia where people have learned to bind elemental powers to their commands.

Her 2013 debut in the young adult fiction sector, the standalone novel The Summer Prince, is set on a post-apocalyptic cyberpunk Brazilian arcology ruled by a nanotech-empowered matriarchy. Love Is the Drug, her 2014 standalone young adult novel, is set in Washington, D.C., and follows a prep-school student whose memory loss may be connected to a burgeoning global influenza pandemic.

In February 2021, Johnson was the literary guest of honor and keynote speaker at the 39th annual Life, the Universe, & Everything professional science fiction and fantasy arts symposium.

== Awards and honors ==
- World Fantasy Awards Winner, Best Novel for Trouble the Saints, 2021
- Andre Norton Award Winner, Best Young Adult Novel for Love Is the Drug, 2015
- Nebula Award Winner, Best Novelette for A Guide to the Fruits of Hawai’i, 2015
- Nebula Award Nominee, Best Novelette for They Shall Salt the Earth with Seeds of Glass, 2013
- Andre Norton Award Nominee for Young Adult Science Fiction and Fantasy for The Summer Prince, 2013
- National Book Award Longlist, Young People's Literature for The Summer Prince, 2013
- GLBTRT Top Ten Rainbow List for The Summer Prince, 2014
- Junior Library Guild selection for The Summer Prince, Spring 2013
- YALSA nominee for their BFYA list for The Summer Prince, 2013
- Finalist for the 2011 Carl Brandon Society Parallax Award for the novel Moonshine
- Finalist for the 2011 Carl Brandon Society Kindred Award for the novel The Burning City
- Top Ten finalist for the 2010 Million Writers Award for the short story "A Song to Greet the Sun"
- Winner of the 2008 Gulliver Travel Grant from the Speculative Literature Foundation
- Finalist for the 2006 Carl Brandon Society Parallax Award for the short story "Shard of Glass"
- Finalist for 2026 Ignyte Award for Outstanding Novelette for "What I Saw Before the War"

== Bibliography ==
=== Novels ===
- —— (2013). The Summer Prince (hardcover 1st ed.). Arthur A. Levine Books. p. 289. ISBN 978-0545417792.
- —— (2014). Love Is the Drug (hardcover 1st ed.). Arthur A. Levine Books. p. 344. ISBN 978-0545417815.
- —— (2020). Trouble the Saints (hardcover 1st ed.). Tor Books. p. 352. ISBN 978-1250175342.
- —— (2023). The Library of Broken Worlds (hardcover 1st ed.). Scholastic Press. p. 448. ISBN 978-1338290622.

==== The Spirit Binders series ====
1. —— (2007). Racing the Dark (hardcover 2008 ed.). Agate Bolden. p. 368. ISBN 978-1932841282.
2. —— (2010). The Burning City (paperback ed.). Agate Bolden. p. 380. ISBN 978-1932841459.

==== Zephyr Hollis series ====
1. —— (2010). Moonshine (paperback ed.). Griffin. p. 278. ISBN 9780312648060.
2. —— (2012). Wicked City (hardcover 1st ed.). Thomas Dunne Books. p. 306. ISBN 978-0312565480.
3. —— (2012). The Inconstant Moon (ebook ed.). Tor Books. p. 32. ISBN 978-1466820821. Quick story, published in ebook and webzine format.

=== Collection ===
- —— (2020). Reconstruction (paperback ed.). Small Beer Press. p. 271. ISBN 978-1618731777. Includes 10 short stories:
  1. "A Guide to the Fruits of Hawai’i"
  2. "Their Changing Bodies"
  3. "They Shall Salt the Earth with Seeds of Glass"
  4. "Down the Well"
  5. "Third Day Lights"
  6. "The Score"
  7. "Far and Deep"
  8. "The Mirages"
  9. "Reconstruction"
  10. "A Song to Greet the Sun"

=== Short fiction ===
Year	Title	First published	Reprinted/collected
2005	"Shard of Glass"	—— (Feb 14, 2005). "Shard of Glass (Part 1)". Strange Horizons. —— (Feb 21, 2005). "Shard of Glass (Part 2)". Strange Horizons.	Year's Best Fantasy 6 pp. 58–77
2005	"Third Day Lights"	—— (Sep–Oct 2005). "Third Day Lights". Interzone (200).	Year's Best SF 11 pp. 281–308
2006	"Among Their Bright Eyes"	—— (Winter 2006). "Among Their Bright Eyes". Fantasy (5).	—— (2007). "Among Their..." Pseudopod.
2008	"Down the Well"	—— (Aug 4, 2008). "Down the Well". Strange Horizons.	
2009	"Far and Deep"	—— (Mar–Apr 2009). "Far and Deep". Interzone (221).	
2009	"The Yeast of Eire"	—— (Sep 7, 2009). "The Yeast of Eire (Part 1)". Strange Horizons. —— (Sep 14, 2009). "The Yeast of Eire (Part 2)". Strange Horizons.	
2009	"A Song to Greet the Sun"	—— (Oct 2009). "A Song to Greet the Sun". Fantasy (31).	
2009	"The Score"	—— (2009). "The Score". Interfictions 2. Small Beer Press: 46–73.	—— (2013). "The Score". Nightmare.
2010	"Love Will Tear Us Apart"	—— (2010). "Love Will Tear Us Apart". Zombies Vs. Unicorns. Margaret K. McElderry Books: 21–48.	
2011	"Their Changing Bodies"	—— (Summer 2011). "Their Changing Bodies". Subterranean Online. Subterranean Press: 7. Archived from the original on 2022-08-14.	
2011	"A Prince of Thirteen Days"	—— (2011). "A Prince of Thirteen Days". Welcome to Bordertown. Random House: 190–219.	
2013	"They Shall Salt the Earth with Seeds of Glass"	—— (Jan 2013). "They Shall Salt the Earth with Seeds of Glass". Asimov's. 37 (1): 10–26.	—— (2021). "They Shall..." Uncanny.
2014	"A Guide to the Fruits of Hawai’i"	—— (Jul–Aug 2014). "A Guide to the Fruits of Hawai'i". F&SF. 127 (1&2): 231–255.	
2017	"A Hundred Thousand Threads"	—— (2017). "A Hundred Thousand Threads". Three Sides of a Heart. HarperTeen: 333–369.	
2020	"The Rules of the Land"	—— (2020). "The Rules of the Land". A Phoenix First Must Burn. Viking Books: 67–84.	
2020	"Reconstruction"	—— (2020). "Reconstruction". Reconstruction. Small Beer Press.	
2020	"The Mirages"	—— (Nov–Dec 2020). "The Mirages". Asimov's. 44 (11&12): 36–44.	
2021	"Trouble the Saints"	—— (2021). "Trouble the Saints". Trouble the Saints. Tor.	
2022	"The Memory Librarian" (with Janelle Monáe)	—— (2022). "The Memory Librarian". The Memory Librarian: And Other Stories of Dirty Computer. HarperVoyager.	
2022	"Wonder Woman: Heartless Volume 1" (With Natalie C. Parker, Tessa Gratton, and Heidi Heilig)	—— (2022). "Wonder Woman: Heartless". 1. Serial Box. ISBN 978-1-63855-081-5.	
2023	"The Library of Broken Worlds"	—— (2023). "The Library of Broken Worlds". Scholastic Incorporated. ISBN 978-1-338-29064-6.	
2025	"What I Saw Before the War"	—— (2025). "What I Saw Before the War". Tor Books.	
