= Petra Mayer =

American book review editor and journalist (1974–2021)

- Mayer at the NPR Headquarters in 2019
- Born: November 30, 1974; Washington, D.C., U.S.
- Died: November 13, 2021 (aged 46); Silver Spring, Maryland, U.S.
- Education: Amherst College (BA); Columbia University (MA)
- Occupations: Journalist; editor
- Years active: 1997–2021

Petra Mayer (November 30, 1974 – November 13, 2021) was an American book review editor and journalist. She was a book editor at NPR, working in the Culture section, and was known for her coverage of San Diego Comic-Con and organizing an interactive book recommendation guide called Book Concierge.

== Life and career ==
Mayer was born on November 30, 1974, in Washington, D.C., where she grew up. She earned her bachelor's degree in history at Amherst College in 1996. According to an interview with her mother, Elke Mayer, it was while studying there that she decided to begin a career in radio. While she was still in college, Mayer joined NPR as an engineering assistant intern.

In 1997, Mayer moved to Boston, Massachusetts, to work as a news writer at the public radio station WBUR. In 1998, she earned her master's degree in journalism at Columbia University, and was hired to work as an intern for Radio Free Europe/Radio Liberty, in Prague. Mayer worked there for two years as an archivist and audio editor.

Mayer returned to Washington, D.C., in 2000 and joined NPR. She worked in several positions within NPR, including as production assistant of Weekend Edition Saturday, and associate producer and director of All Things Considered. In 2012, Mayer joined the Culture section of NPR, where she worked as one of its two books editors. In 2020, Mayer was appointed the editor of NPR's video gaming column.

In 2021 she was awarded the Kate Wilhelm Solstice Award by the SFWA, citing how her pursuit of personal passions contributed to the greater genre community.

== Death ==
Mayer died on November 13, 2021, at the Holy Cross Hospital in Silver Spring, Maryland, from a pulmonary embolism. She was 46 years old.
