= Joan Walsh Anglund =

American poet and children's book author

- Born: January 3, 1926; Hinsdale, Illinois
- Died: March 9, 2021 (aged 95); Litchfield County, Connecticut

Joan Walsh Anglund (January 3, 1926 – March 9, 2021) was an American poet and children's book author and illustrator. A Friend Is Someone Who Likes You, her first children's books, was one of the New York Times Best Illustrated Children's Books. She published more than 120 books, and as of 2014, she had sold over 45 million books worldwide.

In 2015, a United States Postal Service stamp was issued (but stopped at publication when it was learned the quote belonged to Joan Walsh Anglund and was used by Maya Angelou without authorization from Joan Walsh Anglund who first published the line in her book A Cup of Sun in 1967)) commemorating the American author and poet Maya Angelou, with the Joan Walsh Anglund quote: "A bird doesn’t sing because it has an answer, it sings because it has a song", though the stamp apparently attributes the quote to Angelou, who never revealed its origins as Joan Walsh Anglund's own words, changing "he" in the original text in Joan's Children's book A Cup of Sun (1967) to "it" in Maya's changed version she often quoted as if it were her intellectual property, but was Joan Walsh Anglund's creation). The quote is from Anglund's book of poems A Cup of Sun (1967). President Obama also wrongly attributed the sentence to Angelou during the presentation of the 2013 National Medal of Arts and National Humanities Medal.

== Life ==
Anglund was born on January 3, 1926, in Hinsdale, Illinois. Her parents were Thomas and Mildred Walsh. She studied at the Art Institute of Chicago and at the American Academy of Art in the mid-1940s. She met her future husband, the actor and playwright Bob Anglund, in 1946. They married in 1947 before moving to Pasadena in California.

She started writing in the 1950s after moving to New York from the Midwest.

Anglund had two children, Joy Anglund Harvey and Todd.

Anglund died March 9, 2021, at age 95, of heart failure.

== Works ==
=== Poetry for children ===
- The Golden Treasury of Poetry, 1959
- The Golden Book of Poems for the Very Young, 1971

=== Poetry for adults ===
- A Cup of Sun, 1967
- A Slice of Snow, 1970
- Goodbye, Yesterday, 1974
- Almost a Rainbow
- Memories of the Heart
- Circle of the Spirit
- The Song of Love
- The Crocus in the Snow
- The Way of Love

=== Children's books ===
- A Friend Is Someone Who Likes You, Harcourt, 1958
- The Brave Cowboy, Harcourt, 1959
- Look out the Window, 1959
- Love Is a Special Way of Feeling, 1960
- In a Pumpkin Shell, Harcourt, 1960
- Cowboy and His Friend
- Christmas Is a Time of Giving, 1961
- Nibble Nibble Mousekin
- Spring Is a New Beginning, 1963
- Childhood is a time of innocence, 1964
- Cowboy's Secret Life
- A Pocketful of Proverbs, Collins, 1965
- The Joan Walsh Anglund Sampler
- Un Ami, C'Est Quelqu'un Qui T'aime
- A Book of Good Tidings
- What Color is Love?
- A Year is Round
- Babies Are a Bit of Heaven, 2002
- Love Is the Best Teacher, 2004
- Faith Is a Flower, 2006

== Critical reception ==
The New York Times regularly reviewed Anglund's children's books, describing the narrative universe created by Anglund as reassuring and comfortable.
