= Beasts of Prey (novel) =

2021 novel by Ayana Gray

- First edition cover
- Author: Ayana Gray
- Language: English
- Genre: Fantasy
- Publisher: G. P. Putnam's Sons Books for Young Readers
- Publication date: September 28, 2021
- Publication place: United States
- Pages: 496
- ISBN: 978-0-593-40568-0
- OCLC: 1229028609
- Dewey Decimal: [Fic]
- LC Class: PZ7.1.G7326 Be 2021

Beasts of Prey is a 2021 young adult fantasy novel by American writer Ayana Gray. Gray's debut novel follows two teenagers, Koffi and Ekon, who enter the magical Greater Jungle in pursuit of a murderous creature called the Shetani. It was published on September 28, 2021, and quickly entered the New York Times and Indie Bestseller lists.

== Development ==
Ayana Gray has stated that she came up with the idea for the novel while studying political violence in college. A few months later she went on a study programme in Ghana, where she stated that she felt happy to connect with her African heritage. In an interview, she said:

"I left Ghana and knew I wanted to write a story in which Black people had the opportunity to be both magical and nuanced."

— Ayana Gray,

Gray began writing the novel, drawing from various folklores of Africa for most of the beasts in the book, immediately after graduating from the University of Arkansas. She worked on the manuscript between 2015 and 2019. She presented the novel to literary agents at #DVPit, a Twitter pitching event. After connecting with an agent, they both revised the draft for a year before submitting it to editors where it was eventually purchased by G. P. Putnam's Sons in a seven-figure deal.

== Reception ==
The novel became a New York Times Bestseller shortly after publication. It received positive reviews from critics. Kirkus Reviews, in its starred review, called the book a "dazzling debut." Publishers Weekly praised the author's prose, writing, "Gray's lush, vivid descriptions enliven the twisting narrative, which is steeped in Pan-African mythology."

Lacy Baugher of Culturess praised the novel's setting, writing in her review that "Beasts of Prey is set in a rich, fascinating fantasy world, populated by intriguing people and creatures alike."

In a starred review for the School Library Journal, India Winslow also praised the novel stating that "With its memorable characters, and a lush, expansive world, Gray's debut is an action-packed adventure that will tug at hearts and keep teens glued to the page, yearning for more."

== Film adaptation ==
A few weeks after its publication, it was announced that the novel had been optioned for a film adaptation by Netflix. The adaptation will be produced by Clubhouse Pictures and the screenplay will be written by Melody Cooper.
