= Ayana Gray =

American novelist (born 1993)

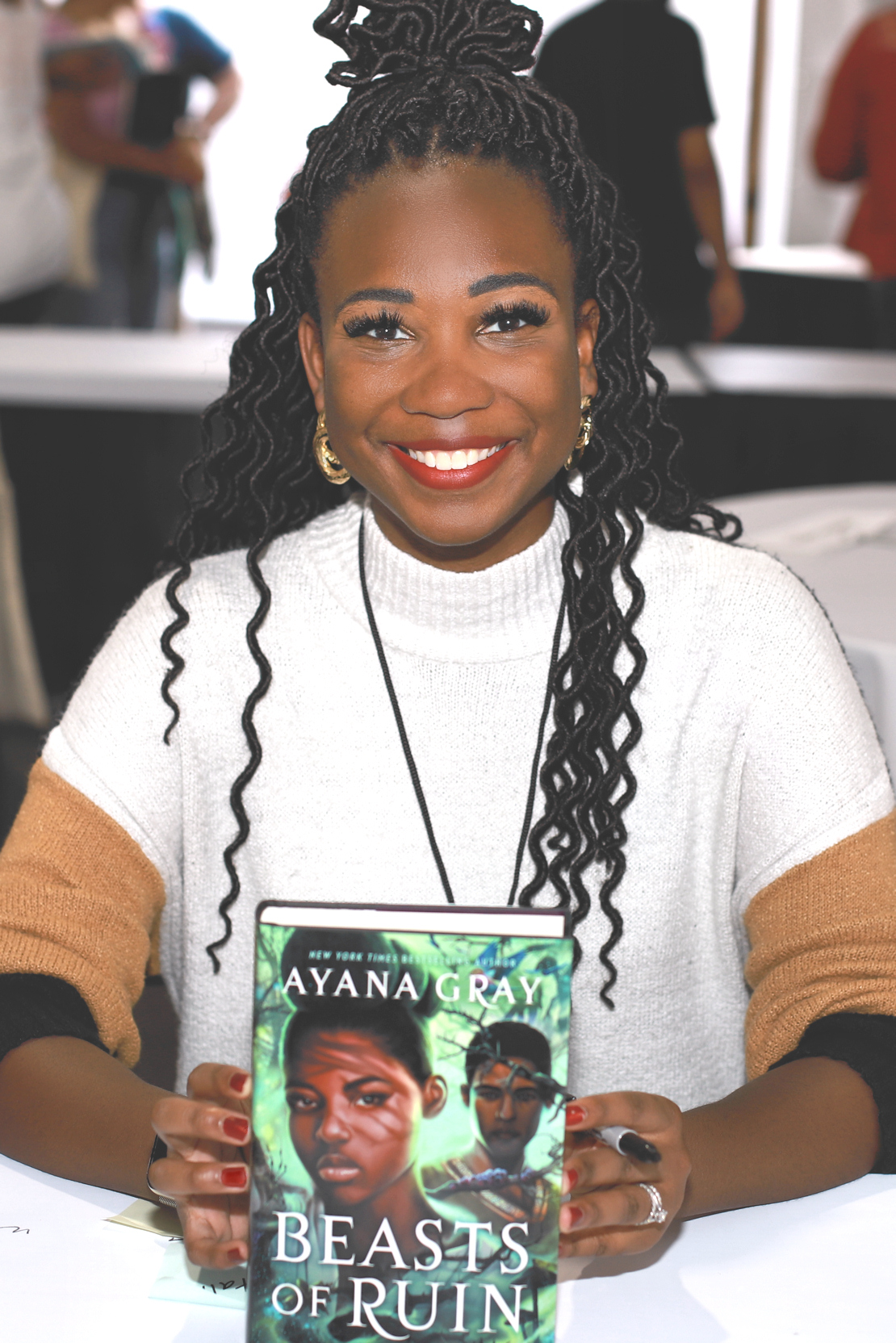
- Gray at the 2022 Texas Book Festival
- Born: March 13, 1993 (age 33); Atlanta, Georgia, U.S.
- Education: University of Arkansas (BA); Pulaski Academy
- Occupation: Novelist
- Writing career
- Language: English
- Years active: 2021–present
- Genres: Fantasy; children's literature
- Notable works: Beasts of Prey; I, Medusa
- Website: ayanagray.com

Ayana Gray (born March 13, 1993) is an American author of young adult fiction. Her 2021 debut novel Beasts of Prey was a New York Times bestseller.

== Biography ==
Gray was born in Atlanta, Georgia, and moved to Little Rock, Arkansas with her family at age thirteen, attending and graduating from Pulaski Academy. Gray received her Bachelor of Arts in political science and African and African-American Studies from the University of Arkansas in 2015.

Gray began writing her debut novel, Beasts of Prey, in May 2015, following her graduation. In July 2020, Gray sold Beasts of Prey and two accompanying books to Putnam Books for Young Readers, an imprint of Penguin Random House.

Beasts of Prey, the first installment in the eponymous trilogy, was published on September 28, 2021. The story takes place in a Pan-African inspired world and follows two Black teens named Koffi and Ekon as they venture into a magical jungle to find and hunt down an ancient monster. Beasts of Prey debuted at number 4 on the New York Times bestseller list. In 2021, it was announced that the book would be adapted into a feature film by Netflix, with Clubhouse Pictures producing.

On November 18, 2025, Gray published her adult debut, I, Medusa, a villain origin story reimagining the tale of Medusa from Greek mythology. I, Medusa debuted at number 13 on the New York times bestseller list, number 19 on the USA Today bestseller list, and number 12 on the Indie bestseller list.

== Personal life ==
Gray currently lives in Little Rock, Arkansas. She is a member of Alpha Kappa Alpha Sorority.

== Bibliography ==
=== Beasts of Prey trilogy ===
- Beasts of Prey (2021) ISBN 9780593405703
- Beasts of Ruin (2022) ISBN 9780593405734
- Beasts of War (2024) ISBN 9780593405741

=== Standalone ===
- I, Medusa (2025) ISBN 9780593733769
- Hawk & Sparrow (2026) ISBN 9781250411235

== Awards and recognition ==
- 2022 Arkansas Center for the Book Selection
- 2022 Georgia Center for the Book Selection

In March 2023, the Beasts of Prey series was chosen as the featured series for the "If All Arkansas Read the Same Book" event.
