= Claire Fuller =

English novelist, short story writer and essayist (born 1967)

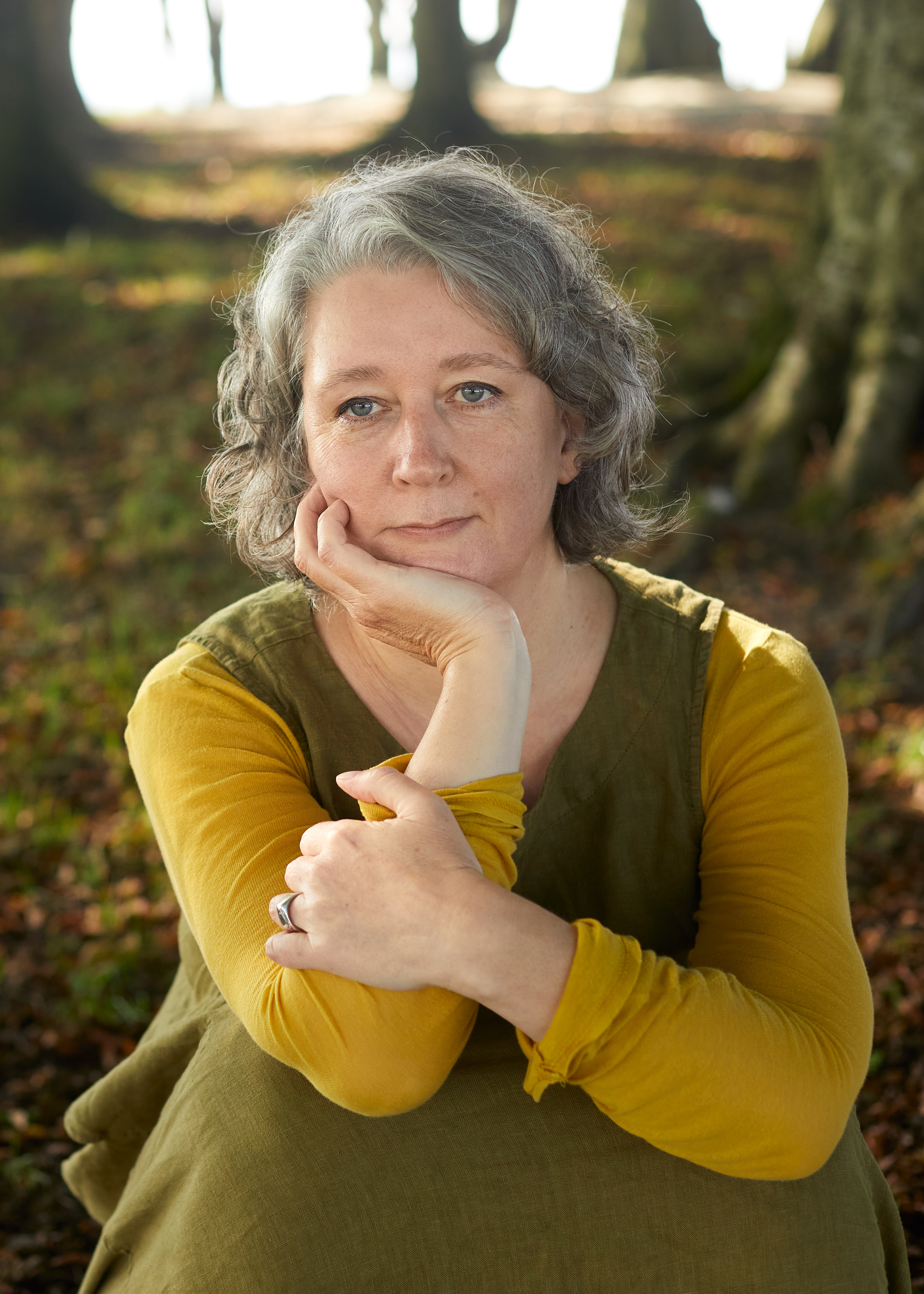
- Born: 9 February 1967 (age 59); Oxfordshire, England
- Education: University of Southampton (B.A.); University of Winchester (M.A.)
- Occupation: Novelist
- Website: www.clairefuller.co.uk

Claire Fuller (born 9 February 1967 in Oxfordshire) is an English novelist and short story writer.

== Life ==
Fuller, born and raised in Oxfordshire, studied sculpture at Winchester School of Art in the 1980s, working mainly in wood and stone, before embarking on a marketing career. She began writing fiction at the age of 40 and holds a master's degree in creative and critical writing from the University of Winchester. She is married, with two adult children.

== Career ==
Our Endless Numbered Days, the first of her novels, won the 2015 Desmond Elliott Prize. Her second novel, Swimming Lessons, was shortlisted for the 2018 Royal Society of Literature Encore Award. Bitter Orange, her third, was nominated for the International Dublin Literary Award. Her fourth novel, Unsettled Ground, won the Costa Book Awards Novel Award 2021 and was shortlisted for the 2021 Women's Prize for Fiction. Her next novel, Hunger and Thirst has been published by Fig Tree/Penguin Books Ltd in May 2026 and won much acclaim. It's a "blend of social realism and gothic horror" says the Guardian reviewer. Her novels have been translated into more than 20 languages.

She won the BBC Opening Lines Short Story Competition in 2014, and the Royal Academy & Pin Drop Short Story Award in 2016.

== Bibliography ==
- Our Endless Numbered Days (2015)
- Swimming Lessons, (2017)
- Bitter Orange, (2018)
- Unsettled Ground, (2021)
- The Memory of Animals, (2023)
- Hunger and Thirst, (2026)
