= Trouble the Saints =

2020 novel by Alaya Dawn Johnson

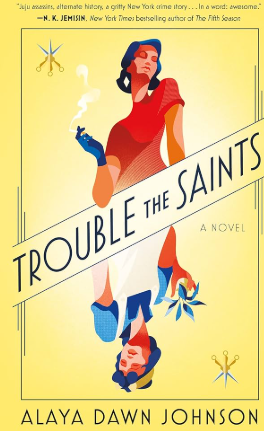
- Author: Alaya Dawn Johnson
- Cover artist: Charlie Davis
- Language: English
- Genre: Fantasy
- Publisher: Tor Books / Macmillan Publishers
- Publication date: July 21, 2020
- Pages: 352
- ISBN: 978-1-250-17535-9

Trouble the Saints is a 2020 historical fantasy novel by Alaya Dawn Johnson. It was first published by Tor Books/Macmillan Publishers.

== Synopsis ==
In an alternate New York City in the early 1940s, Phyllis LeBlanc works for “Russian Victor”, a mob boss. Phyllis passes for white as she uses her "saints' hands" — a supernatural skill with throwing knives — to kill people whom Victor claims are evil. Ten years ago, Victor ordered Phyllis to kill a man named Trent Sullivan. Phyllis has since left the world of assassins, but Victor asks her to complete one final job: assassinate Sullivan’s girlfriend, Maryann West.

Phyllis’s ex-boyfriend Dev Patil also has magical abilities; he can foresee threats. He ended their relationship because he opposed Phyllis’s violence. He began dating Phyllis’s friend Tamara, an oracle with the ability to read cards.

Maryann shoots Phyllis. While she is recovering, Phyllis and Dev discuss the case. Phyllis realizes that Trent Sullivan was innocent and that Victor had used her as a killing tool. Phyllis promises to kill him. Meanwhile, Dev has been working for the police against Victor while trying to protect Phyllis. Phyllis attempts to kill Victor, but loses her nerve at the last moment. Maryann is poisoned on Victor’s orders. Dev kills Victor to protect Phyllis, despite his pacifist beliefs. The two flee the city together and rekindle their relationship.

Dev receives a draft notice, but he hides this from Phyllis. Meanwhile, Alvin is a local Black man with saints’ hands. He works for Ben Craver, who holds a grudge against the powerful Bell family. Alvin can sees people’s secrets by touching them. Alvin asks Dev for help, claiming that the Bell family wants to kill him.

Craver, Dev, Phyllis, Tamara, and Alvin are all present at a restaurant with the Bell family. A violent confrontation occurs. Alvin is shot but survives. Later that evening, Bobby Bell Jr. attacks Dev and Phyllis; they fight him off. Police arrive, claiming that Bobby Bell Sr. is dead and that Craver is seriously wounded. Alvin, the prime suspect, is missing. In fact, Alvin’s mother Mae killed the elder Bell, leading to Junior’s rampage when he discovered his father’s corpse.

Phyllis reveals to Dev that she is pregnant. At a local civic event, Alvin appears and attempts to inform the police of a coming attack. Craver detonates a suicide bomb to destroy the building. Bobby Bell Jr. escapes unharmed. Alvin, Phyllis, and Dev are arrested on suspicion of being his accomplices. Dev blackmails his police handler into dropping the charges. In return, Dev and other agents agree not to contest their draft notices. Dev and Phyllis marry before he leaves for war.

Phyllis has a vision of Victor's ghost, perhaps triggered by the powers of her unborn child. Tamara and Phyllis move upstate. Phyllis begins to lose control of her hands. Tamara’s cards show her that Victor’s death has brought a curse down upon Phyllis. Tamara can either take the curse upon herself or allow Phyllis and her child to die. Despite an initial rejection, Tamara accepts the curse on Phyllis’s behalf.

Phyllis learns that Dev has been killed in action. She goes into labor, but she is turned away from a segregated hospital. Phyllis dies in childbirth. Tamara rocks Phyllis’s daughter while reading Dev’s final letter to his wife.

== Reception ==
Trouble the Saints won the 2021 World Fantasy Award—Novel.

Kirkus Reviews praised it as a "nuanced portrait of racism in all of its poisonous flavors" which explores "the incredibly fraught, liminal space of being a light-skinned person of color", extolling Johnson's "musical prose" and "passionate and painful depictions of the love expressed in romance and friendship ". Publishers Weekly found it to "challenging [and] diverse", and a "literary firecracker" with "dynamic characters" and "style to spare", but faulted the plot as "overstuffed".

National Public Radio commended Johnson for transcending "the classic noir tale of an assassin desperate to be done with the life", but critiqued her portrayal of characters who were neither black nor white, asking "how much that part of their identity ([Victor's second-in-command] Walter is Native American and Dev is Indian) was being treated more as window dressing than being Black or white was, for Black and white characters."

Tor.com observed Johnson's choice to forego a "three-act narrative arc" despite having three viewpoint characters (including Tamara, who Phyllis and Dev meet later), noting that "what readers will anticipate is the crux of the story — Phyllis' relationship not only with her mob boss but with Dev" is in fact resolved at the end of the first part, with the rest of the novel being "all consequence and fallout, echoing with the reverberations of trauma". FIYAH considered it a "wonderfully rich blend of a vividly dangerous world, laced with magic in a vibrant presentation of historical reality", with "lyrical writing" and "characters [who] feel real and almost lovable", and recommended it to those who seek "heavily character-driven narrative laced with mysticism", but also described it as "imbalanced", with the viewpoints of Phyllis, Dev, and Tamara "not having the same effect throughout".
