= What Big Teeth =

2021 novel by Rose Szabo

- First edition
- Author: Rose Szabo
- Audio read by: Jasika Nicole
- Language: English
- Genre: Young adult fiction
- Published: 2021
- Publisher: Farrar, Straus and Giroux
- Publication place: United States
- Media type: Print (hardback), ebook, audiobook
- Pages: 400 pages
- ISBN: 0374314306 First edition hardback
- OCLC: 1159839519

What Big Teeth is a 2021 young adult gothic dark fantasy novel by Rose Szabo and marks their debut novel.

== Synopsis ==
Eleanor has spent most of her life at boarding school but has returned home after she was involved with an incident that may be related to a vague memory from her past. While she cannot relate with her strange family, Eleanor also seeks to hold them together as best as possible. This requires her to not only come to terms with and accept her family, but also the secrets hiding within herself.

== Development ==
Szabo chose to leave the description of the changing from human to wolf form undescribed, as they view ambiguity as "the friend of the monster". In an interview with Tor Nightfire they stated that "a monster is a person where a person should not be" and that "That process–of being startled to encounter a person where you expected none–is one that I think can be liberating, as much as it is terrifying."

== Release ==
What Big Teeth was first published in the United States on February 2, 2021, through Farrar, Straus and Giroux in both hardback and ebook formats. An audiobook adaptation narrated by Jasika Nicole was published through Macmillan Audio.

== Reception ==
Critical reception for What Big Teeth has been positive and the novel has received comparisons to Katrina Leno's Horrid and Shea Ernshaw's The Wicked Deep. Multiple reviewers noted the novel's pacing and in a guest review for Entropy Jake Demers stated that "While it wouldn’t be unfair to call this book slowly-paced, it would be unfair to list this as a negative quality. This book is slow and patient with its reader precisely because everything has a purpose." Tor.com and NPR both commented upon Szabo's depiction of the characters and monsters, with NPR writing that the point of the metaphors of humanity and monsters was that "It's easier to ignore the deep-rooted trauma that gives us all the potential to be monsters than it is to face it head-on."
