= Frankenslime =

Picture book by Joy Keller

- Author: Joy Keller
- Illustrator: Ashley Belote
- Genre: Picture book
- Publisher: Feiwel & Friends
- Publication date: July 13, 2021
- Publication place: US
- Pages: 40
- ISBN: 9781250765802
- Website: us.macmillan.com

Frankenslime is a 2021 picture book written by Joy Keller and illustrated by Ashley Belote. The book was published on July 13, 2021, by Feiwel & Friends, an imprint of Macmillan Publishers.

== Plot ==
A young slime scientist is surprised when her latest creation comes to life in Frankenslime, a picture book twist on Frankenstein.

Victoria Franken is a slime-creating scientist. One dark and stormy night, her experiment goes awry and her newest creation comes to life.
