= Firefly (novel) =

Novel by Philippa Dowding

- Author: Philippa Dowding
- Language: English
- Genre: Children, fiction
- Published: 2021
- Publisher: DCB / Cormorant Books, Toronto
- Publication place: Canada
- Media type: Print (paperback), digital (eBook)
- Pages: 216
- Award: Governor General’s Literary Award
- ISBN: 9781770865983

Firefly is a novel written by Canadian author Philippa Dowding, and published in 2021 by DCB / Cormorant Books in Toronto, Ontario. It won the 2021 Governor General's Literary Award for Young People’s Literature - Text.

== Plot ==
Firefly is a thirteen-year-old girl looking for a new home after police take her unstable and violent mother away. She is discovered living in the park across from her mother's home and is forced by social services to live with her Aunt Gayle, owner of the Corseted Lady Costume Shop. While Firefly adjusts to having a roof over her head, she develops post-traumatic stress disorder (PTSD) and sets out on a quest to discover her true identity.

== Reception ==
Firefly was generally well received in Canada. The Governor General’s Literary Award Peer Assessment Committee for the 2021 English-language awards wrote "Firefly will shine for readers and resonate long after they close this quietly powerful book.” Teachers Guide at the 49th Shelf listed the novel for grades 4 to 7 in English Language Arts, and grades 6 to 8 in Social Science and Humanities.

== Awards ==
Awards for Firefly
Year	Award	Result	Ref.
2021	Governor General's Award for Young People’s Literature - Text	Winner	
2022	Forest of Reading Red Maple Award	Nominee	
2022	IODE Violet Downey Award	Shortlist	
2022	Ruth and Sylvia Schwartz Children’s Book Award	Winner	
2023	MYRCA Northern Lights	Shortlist	
2023	Rocky Mountain Book Awards	Shortlist	
