= The Sour Cherry Tree =

Book by Naseem Hrab and Nahid Kazemi

- Hardcover (2021)
- Author: Naseem Hrab
- Illustrator: Nahid Kazemi
- Language: English
- Genres: Juvenile; Fiction; Picture
- Published: October 15, 2021
- Publisher: Owlkids
- Publication place: Canada
- Media type: Hardcover
- Pages: 32
- Award: Governor General’s Literary Award
- ISBN: 9781771474146
- Website: naseemhrab.com

The Sour Cherry Tree is a children's book written by Canadian author Naseem Hrab and illustrated by Canadian author and illustrator Nahid Kazemi. It was published in 2021 by Owlkids and won the 2022 Governor General’s Literary Award for Young People's Literature – Illustrated Books.

== Synopsis ==
The Sour Cherry Tree is the story of a little girl on the day her grandfather died, moving from room to room in her Baba Borzog’s house, looking at things that bring back memories of him.

== Awards ==
The Sour Cherry Tree won the 2022 Governor General's Award for Young People's Literature – Illustrated Books. The book was selected by a three-person peer assessment committee, and the award was granted by the Canada Council for the Arts, which is normally presented by the Governor General of Canada at a ceremony held at Rideau Hall.

== Reception ==
The book was generally well received. Reviewer Simone Dalton writes in the magazine Quill & Quire, "The Sour Cherry Tree lives on beyond the page. From the expanse of grief to a message of hope, it embodies what the young girl perhaps most loved about her grandfather: that he loved her." As published in Kirkus Reviews, "Hrab’s narrative captures a child’s understanding of loss with gentle subtlety and gives space for processing those feelings." adding, "Kazemi’s chalk pastel art pairs perfectly with the text and title."
