= Unsettled Ground =

2021 novel by Claire Fuller

- Author: Claire Fuller
- Publisher: Tin House Books
- Publication date: May 18, 2021

Unsettled Ground is a novel by Claire Fuller, published May 18, 2021 by Tin House Books.

== Reception ==
Unsettled Ground received starred reviews from Library Journal and Booklist, as well as positive reviews from Publishers Weekly, NPR, Los Angeles Times, The Times Literary Supplement, The Wall Street Journal, The Guardian, and Shelf Awareness.

Writing for Booklist, Poornima Apte wrote, "Fuller ... paints a devastatingly haunting picture of abject poverty, especially in her descriptions of the houses they dwell in, each of which becomes a character in its own right. This tale offers a remarkable peek into how the embrace of family can completely smother other aspects of life. Nevertheless, human ingenuity persists." Shelf Awareness's Alice Martin echoed Apte's sentiment, stating, "Fuller's ability to craft nuanced and affecting characters."

NPR's Ilana Masad called Unsettled Ground "a terribly beautiful book," noting that "although its premise may seem quiet, it is full of dramatic twists and turns right up until its moving, beautiful end."

Kirkus Reviews provided a mixed review, saying, "At once unsettling and hopeful, [Unsettled Ground] checks all the boxes of an engrossing mystery, but it falters in its pacing. And when the book's big dark secret is finally exhumed, the reader feels just as cheated as its protagonists do."

Good Housekeeping named Unsettled Ground one of the best novels of the year.

=== Awards ===
Year	Award	Category	Result	Ref.
2021	Costa Book Award	Novel	Won	
2021	Women's Prize for Fiction	—	Shortlisted	
