= The Magical Reality of Nadia =

Children's book released in 2021

- Author: Bassem Yousef and Catherine R. Daly
- Illustrator: Douglas Holgate
- Language: English
- Publisher: Scholastic Inc.
- Publication date: January 5, 2021
- Publication place: United States
- Pages: 176
- ISBN: 9781338572285 Hardcover

The Magical Reality of Nadia is a 2021 children's book by Bassem Youssef and Catherine R. Daly, published by Scholastic Books. The illustrator is Douglas Holgate.

It is about a girl named Nadia, a student at a California middle school, who finds she has a magical amulet after being bullied by a student over her Egyptian American ethnicity.

In 2020 Youssef had plans to make a television show out of the series.

== Reception ==
Publishers Weekly wrote that "Youssef and Daly strike a solid balance between magical worldbuilding, witty humor, and a unifying anti-xenophobic theme."

Kirkus Reviews wrote "Readers will cheer for Nadia."
