= The Tudors in Love =

2021 non-fiction book by Sarah Gristwood

The Tudors in Love: Passion and Politics in the Age of England's Most Famous Dynasty
- Author: Sarah Gristwood
- Publication date: September 23, 2021
- ISBN: 9781786078940

The Tudors in Love: Passion and Politics in the Age of England's Most Famous Dynasty is a non-fiction book by Sarah Gristwood. It is about the House of Tudor and its members various romantic relationships.

== Overview ==
The Tudors in Love is a history of the Tudor period in England with a focus on the royal members of the House of Tudor and their romantic relationships. Gristwood argues that much of the justification for Tudor rule in Europe was based on their relationships and "courtly love," tracing the idea back more than 300 years. Case studies from the book include Henry VIII and his six wives, the execution of Anne Boleyn, and Elizabeth I's courtiers.

== Reception ==
The Tudors in Love was positively received by critics. Publishers Weekly noted the detail Gristwood described the Tudors with and noted her ability to decipher "the era's flowerly language." Kirkus Reviews praised the book's depth but criticized the level of literary scholarship. Tina Brown, writing in The New York Times, described the book as "dense but compelling" and praised Gristwood for humanizing the various Tudor royals. Historian Gareth Russell wrote a positive review of the book for The Times, describing Gristwood as having "brilliantly and entertainingly illuminated" the time period.
