= Wonder Walkers =

2021 picture book by Micha Archer

- Author: Micha Archer
- Illustrator: Micha Archer
- Language: English
- Genre: Picture book
- Publisher: Nancy Paulsen Books, an imprint of Penguin Books
- Publication date: March 30, 2021
- Publication place: United States
- Pages: 32
- Awards: Caldecott Honor
- ISBN: 978-0-593-10964-9

Wonder Walkers is a children's picture book written and illustrated by Micha Archer. Through poetic text, it shows two kids of color as they walk through nature and ponder its mysteries. Wonder Walkers was published on March 30, 2021, by Nancy Paulsen Books, an imprint of Penguin Random House.

== Reception ==
Kirkus Reviews, which gave Wonder Walkers a starred review, commented on the writing by Archer, calling the questions asked by the characters in the book "spare and economic yet profound and beautifully poetic." Writing about the illustrations, they noted the mix of ink and collage "are lush and vivid, perfectly suiting the text." Writing for The Horn Book, Julie Danielson commented on the "vibrant colors, beguiling textures, and boundless energy" from the art, and concluded by calling it "[b]eautifully rendered — and wonderful in every way." Publishers Weekly's starred review praised Archer's illustrations and techniques.

Wonder Walkers was the recipient of a Caldecott Honor in 2022.
