= Philippa Dowding =

Canadian author, poet and musician

Philippa Dowding is a Canadian writer of children's literature, whose novel Firefly was the winner of the Governor General's Award for English-language children's literature at the 2021 Governor General's Awards.

She has also been a four-time nominee for Forest of Reading's Silver Birch Awards, receiving nods in 2017 for Myles and the Monster Outside and in 2020 for Oculum.

== Works ==
- Oculum (2018)
- Firefly (2021)

=== Weird Stories Gone Wrong series ===
- Jake and the Giant Hand (2014)
- Myles and the Monster Outside (2015)
- Carter and the Curious Maze (2016)
- Alex and the Other (2018)
- Blackwells and the Briny Deep (2018)
- Quinn and the Quiet, Quiet (2019)

=== Nightflyers Handbook series ===
- The Strange Gift of Gwendolyn Golden (2014)
- Everton Miles is Stranger than Me (2016)
