= Have You Ever Seen a Flower? =

2021 children's picture book by Shawn Harris

- Author: Shawn Harris
- Illustrator: Harris
- Language: English
- Genre: Picture book, children’s book
- Publisher: Chronicle Books
- Publication date: May 4, 2021
- Publication place: United States
- Pages: 48
- Awards: Caldecott Honor
- ISBN: 978-1-4521-8270-4

Have You Ever Seen a Flower? is a children's picture book written and illustrated by Shawn Harris. It tells the story of a kid who leaves the big city to visit a meadow, where they are challenged to use all their five senses to explore nature. The book was published by Chronicle Books on May 4, 2021, and was the recipient of a Caldecott Honor.

== Reception ==
Kirkus Reviews called the work of Shawn Harris "[a] visual feast teeming with life," and highlighted the author's art style, which they say "evoke Oaxacan design." Publishers Weekly gave the book a starred review and said "[w]ith assurance and passion in his solo debut, Harris [...] connects readers to the stirrings of life in all its forms."

Writing for The Horn Book, Megan Dowd Lambert praised Harris' illustrations as vibrant and rich, and noted they have a "naive style," which, combined with "playfully inquisitive text," is used to "imply a child as ostensible artist." Lambert also compares the style of the writing to those found in books by Margaret Wise Brown and Ruth Krauss.

Have You Ever Seen a Flower? was the recipient of a Caldecott Honor in 2022.
