= Aftershocks (memoir) =

2021 memoir by Nadia Owusu

- Author: Nadia Owusu
- Genre: Memoir
- Publisher: Simon & Schuster
- Publication date: 2020

Aftershocks: A Memoir is a 2020 book by Nadia Owusu, published by Simon & Schuster, which won the 2019 nonfiction Whiting Award. The book is a memoir covering personal, political and historical levels related to the author's origins and itinerant upbringing in several African and European countries accompanied by her caring although globetrotting father from Ghana. Despite their intense nomadism, her father nurtured her affective and cultural bonding to their Asante ethnic roots in West Africa, where they traveled every year to visit relatives and friends. The memoir spans her early childhood to her late twenties. Having been abandoned by her Armenian mother when she was 2 years old, Nadia orphaned from her father when she was 13, following which she battles over the years to summon a historically contextualized, confident self as a young adult to gain socially minded, high level education and employment in the United States.

== Reception ==
The book was reviewed by The New York Times, The Guardian, The Washington Post, and NPR.
