= Marion Winik =

American journalist

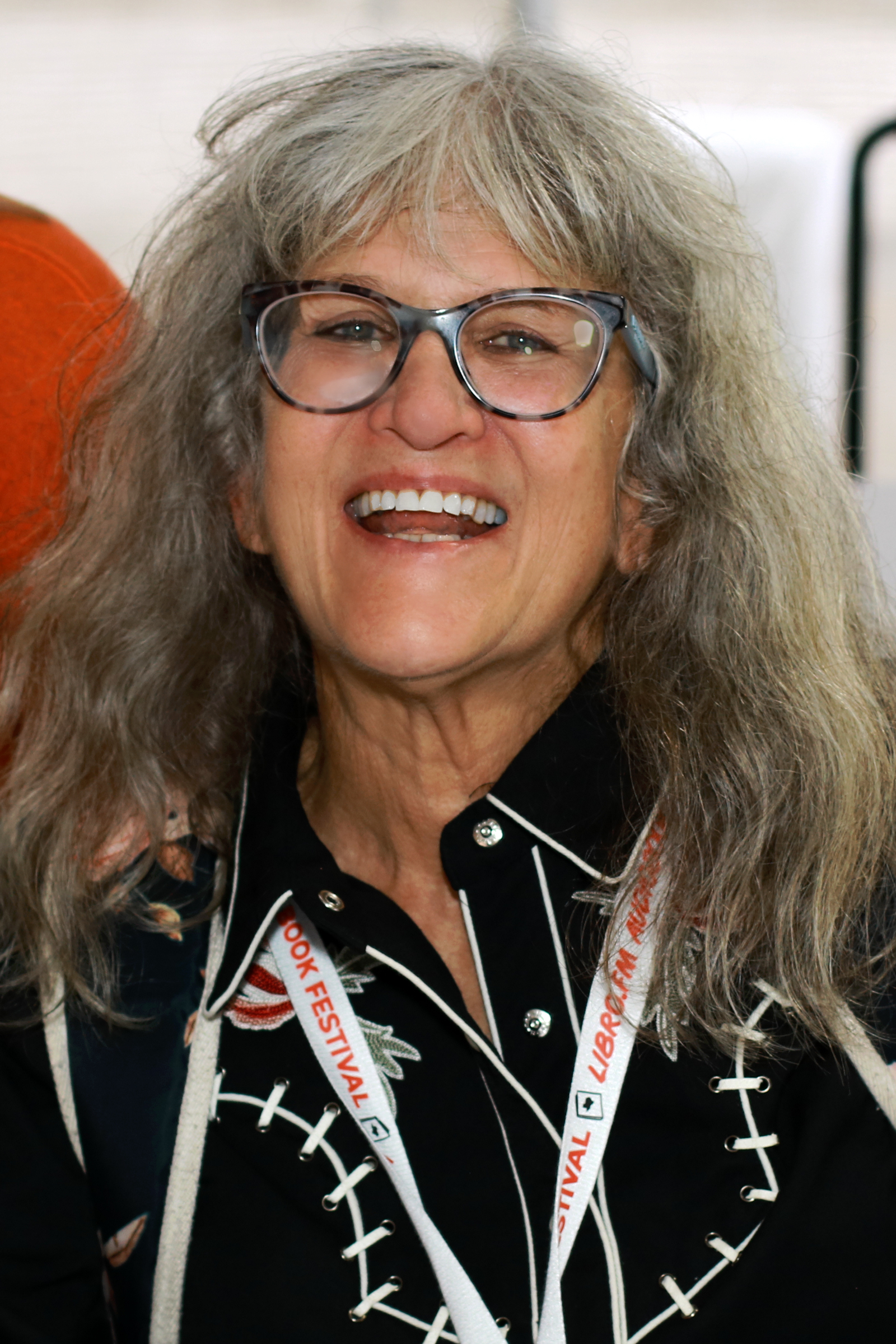
- Winik at the 2024 Texas Book Festival.
- Born: 1958 (age 67–68); New York City, U.S.
- Education: Brown University; Brooklyn College (MFA)
- Occupations: Journalist; author

Marion Winik is an American journalist and author, best known for her work on NPR's All Things Considered.

== Early life and education ==
Winik was born in Manhattan in 1958 and grew up on the Jersey shore. She began writing poetry in 1969, at age 11.

She graduated from Brown University in 1978, majoring in History and Semiotics, and received her MFA from Brooklyn College in 1983.

== Career ==
In her childhood and early twenties, Winik focused on writing poetry, publishing two collections, Nonstop and Boycrazy. Winik then began writing personal essays in the late 1980s, which were published in The Austin Chronicle beginning in January 1989. These essays caught John Burnett's eye, who was an NPR reporter based in Austin, Texas at the time. He suggested that Winik work as a commentator for All Things Considered and her first piece was published there in 1991. The following year, a literary agent contacted her, resulting in the 1994 publication of Telling, a collection of Winik's essays.

A couple of years later in 1996, Winik published First Comes Love, a memoir about her marriage to Tony, who died of AIDS in 1994. In her review of the book in the New York Times, Daphne Merkin wrote, "Marion Winik is resilient, hardy, unfazable; this self-described "suburban boho wannabe" is a frontier woman in disguise."

A professor in the MFA program at the University of Baltimore since 2007, Winik writes "Bohemian Rhapsody," a monthly column at Baltimore Fishbowl.com. She is a board member of the National Book Critics Circle and reviews books for People, Newsday, The Washington Post, and Kirkus Reviews. Winik hosts The Weekly Reader podcast at WYPR. Her honors include an NEA Fellowship in Creative Nonfiction and the 2019 Towson Prize for literature.

== Personal life ==
Winik met her husband, Tony, in New Orleans in 1983. Although Tony was openly gay, they married and had two sons. He died from AIDS complications in 1994.

== Bibliography ==
- ABOVE US ONLY SKY (Counterpoint, 2020; Seal Press, 2005)
- THE BIG BOOK OF THE DEAD (Counterpoint, 2019)
- THE BALTIMORE BOOK OF THE DEAD (Counterpoint, 2018)
- HIGHS IN THE LOW FIFTIES (Globe Pequot Press, 2013)
- RULES FOR THE UNRULY (Simon & Schuster, 2001)

=== Memoirs and essays ===
- Winik, Marion (2008). The Glen Rock Book of the Dead. Berkeley: Counterpoint. ISBN 978-1-58243-431-5.
- The Lunch-box Chronicles: Notes from the Parenting Underground. New York: Pantheon. 1998. ISBN 978-0-375-40156-5.
- First Comes Love. Pantheon. 1996.
- Telling: Confessions, Concessions, and Other Flashes of Light. New York: Villard Books. 1994. ISBN 978-0-679-42859-6.

=== Poetry ===
- Dona Schwartz, Alison Nordstrom, and Marion Winik (2010). In the Kitchen. Heidelberg, Germany: Kehrer Verlag.
- Boycrazy (Slough Press, 1985)
- Nonstop. Cedar Rock. 1981.

=== As editor ===
- Alejandro, Ann. Shihab Nye, Naomi; Winik, Marion (eds.). I Know About a Thousand Things.
