= Sarah Gristwood =

English journalist and author

Sarah Gristwood is an English journalist and author. She was born in Kent, grew up in Dover and was educated at St Anne's College, Oxford.

As a journalist she has written for a number of British papers, including The Times, The Guardian and the Telegraph. She has written historical biographies as well as fiction, and has contributed to television documentaries.

Gristwood's historical biography, Arbella: England's Lost Queen is about Lady Arbella Stuart, an English noblewoman who was considered a possible successor to Elizabeth I. In a review in The Times, Kevin Sharpe wrote, "Sarah Gristwood presents a powerful story of the dynastic insecurity of the Tudors and Stuarts, and of the vulnerability of Elizabeth and James to foreign and domestic intrigues." Sarah Gristwood accepted the invitation of the Royal Stuart Society, on the occasion of the Quatercentenary of the death of Arbella, to give a Lecture with the title: Lady Arbella Stuart – England’s Lost Queen?

Her book, Game of Queens: The Women Who Made Sixteenth-Century Europe, focuses on five queens: Catherine de' Medici, Anne Boleyn, "Bloody "Mary I, Elizabeth I, and Mary, Queen of Scots.

She has appeared in the movie Venice/Venice (1992), and as herself in the television series Stars of the Silver Screen (2011) and Discovering Fashion: The Designers (2015).

Gristwood was married to the film critic Derek Malcolm from 1994 until his death in 2023.

== Bibliography ==
- Perdita: Royal Mistress, Writer, Romantic (2005). Bantam. ISBN 9780593052082
- Arbella: England's Lost Queen (2005). Houghton Mifflin. ISBN 9780618341337
- Bird of Paradise: The Colourful Career of the First Mrs Robinson (2007). Bantam. ISBN 9780553816174
- Elizabeth and Leicester: The Truth about the Virgin Queen and the Man She Loved (2008). Penguin Books. ISBN 9780143114499
- The Ring and the Crown: A History of Royal Weddings (2011). Hutchinson. ISBN 9780091943776
- Breakfast at Tiffany's Companion: The Official 50th Anniversary Companion (2011). Rizzoli International Publications. ISBN 9780847836710
- The Girl in the Mirror (2012). William Collins. ISBN 9780007379057
- Blood Sisters: The Women Behind the Wars of the Roses (2012). Harper Press. ISBN 9780007309290
- Fabulous Frocks (2013). Pavilion. ISBN 9781909108264
- Game of Queens: The Women Who Made Sixteenth-Century Europe (2016). Basic Books. ISBN 9780465096787
- The Story of Beatrix Potter (2016) United Kingdom: Pavilion Books. ISBN 9781909881808
- Elizabeth: Queen and Crown (2017). Pavilion. ISBN 9781911595076
- The Queen's Mary: In the Shadows of Power... (2018). Sharpe Books.
- Vita & Virginia: The Lives and Love of Virginia Woolf and Vita Sackville-West (2018). National Trust. ISBN 9781911358381
- The Tudors in Love: The Courtly Code Behind the Last Medieval Dynasty (2021). Oneworld Publications. ISBN 9780861543748
