= Stuart Kelly (literary critic) =

Scottish critic and author

Stuart Kelly FRSL
- Education: University of Oxford
- Occupations: Literary critic and author
- Employer: The Scotsman
- Writing career
- Language: English

Stuart Kelly is a Scottish critic and author. He is the literary editor of The Scotsman.

His works include The Book Of Lost Books: An Incomplete Guide To All The Books You’ll Never Read (2005), Scott-Land: The Man Who Invented A Nation (2010) (which was longlisted for the BBC Samuel Johnson Prize for Non-Fiction) and The Minister and the Murderer (2018). Kelly writes for The Scotsman, Scotland On Sunday, The Guardian and The Times. In 2013 Kelly was a judge for the Man Booker Prize. In 2016/17 Kelly was president of The Edinburgh Sir Walter Scott Club.

In October 2013, in an article that was published by The Mirror, Kelly claimed that 106 missing episodes of Doctor Who had been uncovered. He claimed to have obtained this information from a friend, who told him the episodes were discovered in Ethiopia. As of 2025, no missing episodes have been found in Ethiopia.

Kelly was elected a Fellow of the Royal Society of Literature (FRSL) in 2026.

== Bibliography ==
- The Book of Lost Books (2005)
- Scott-land: The Man Who Invented a Nation (2011)
- The Minister and the Murderer (2018)
