= British Jews =

British citizens who are Jewish

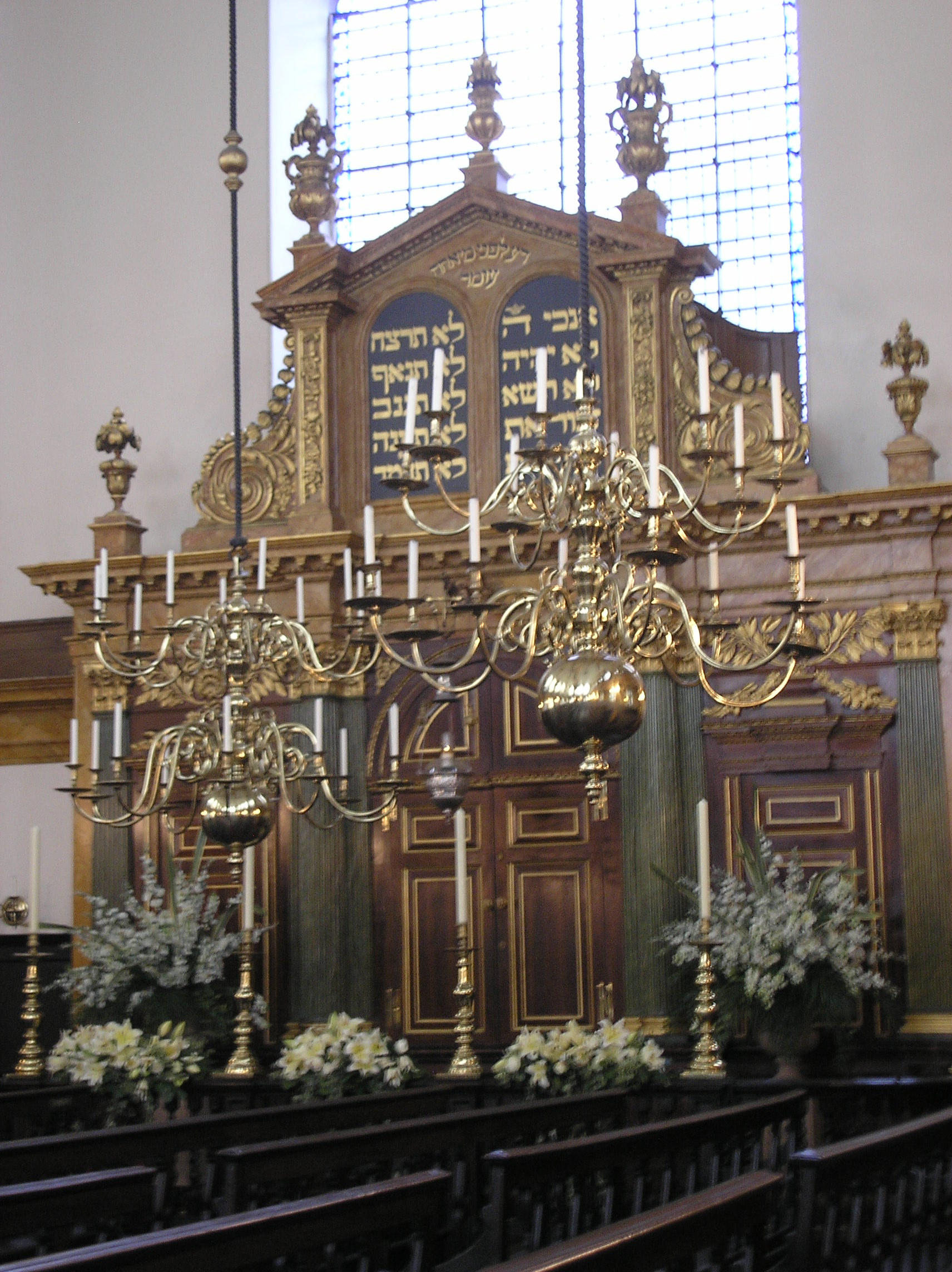
- Bevis Marks Synagogue, the oldest synagogue in the United Kingdom, built 1701

Total population
- United Kingdom: 277,613 – 0.4% (2021/22 Census); England: 269,283 – 0.5% (2021); Scotland: 5,847 – 0.1% (2022); Wales: 2,044 – 0.07% (2021); Northern Ireland: 439 – 0.02% (2021); Other estimates: Core Jewish population: 290,000 (2018); Enlarged Jewish population (includes non-Jewish relatives of Jews): 370,000 (2018)

Regions with significant populations
- London, Greater Manchester, Leeds, Gateshead, Brighton, St Albans, Southend; also Hertsmere, Epping Forest and East Renfrewshire

Languages
- Primarily English; also Yiddish, largely spoken by Hassidic Jews; historically Spanish and Portuguese among Sephardim; immigrant languages include or have included Hebrew, Arabic, Russian and French amongst many others

Religion
- Judaism or irreligion

Related ethnic groups
- Anglo-Israelis and other Jews

British Jews (often referred to collectively as British Jewry or Anglo-Jewry) are citizens of the United Kingdom who are Jewish, one of the country's ethnoreligious minority communities. Jewish presence in Britain dates to at least the 11th century, when William the Conqueror encouraged Jewish merchants and financiers to migrate from northern France to London. The Jews were expelled from England under Edward I in 1290, but a continuous community was re-established following the readmission of Jews under Oliver Cromwell in the 1650s. From the 18th century onwards, British Jews became increasingly integrated into national life, contributing to commerce, science, literature, and politics while maintaining distinctive religious and communal institutions. Some 60,000-70,000 British Jews served in the British Army during the Second World War, serving in all branches and theatres of war. Prominent British Jews have included Prime Minister Benjamin Disraeli; financier and activist Moses Montefiore; scientist Rosalind Franklin; playwright Harold Pinter; businessman Michael Marks; and philosopher Sir Isaiah Berlin.

Waves of migration from Eastern Europe in the late 19th and early 20th centuries transformed Jewish life in Britain, particularly in London’s East End, Manchester, and Leeds, substantially increasing the community's numbers while altering its cultural composition. The community has since diversified, including both long-established Anglo-Jewish families and more recent arrivals from Europe, the Middle East, and the Commonwealth.

According to the 2021 UK census, 277,613 people identified as Jewish, representing about 0.4% of the total population. The majority of British Jews live in and around London, which is home to about two-thirds of the national Jewish population. The largest concentrations are in the boroughs of Barnet, Harrow, and Hackney, and in nearby Hertfordshire suburbs such as Borehamwood, Bushey, and Elstree, which together form one of the largest Jewish urban areas in Europe. The second major centre is Greater Manchester, particularly Salford, Prestwich, and Whitefield, where a rapidly growing Haredi community has developed alongside long-established congregations. Smaller but historic Jewish populations remain in Leeds, Gateshead, Glasgow, Liverpool, and Birmingham.

== History ==
The first recorded Jewish community in Britain was brought to England in 1070 by King William the Conqueror who believed the Jewish population's commercial skills would make his newly won country more prosperous. At the end of the 12th century, a series of blood libels and fatal pogroms were perpetrated in England, particularly on the east coast. On 16 March 1190, during the run up to the Third Crusade, the Jewish population of York was massacred at the site where Clifford's Tower now stands.

In 1275, King Edward I of England passed the Statute of the Jewry (Statutum de Judaismo). This restricted the community's business activities, outlawing the practice of usury (charging interest). Fifteen years later, finding that many of these provisions were ignored, Edward expelled the Jews from England. The Jewish population emigrated to countries such as Poland which protected them by law. A small English community persisted in hiding despite the expulsion. Jews were not banned from Scotland, which was an independent kingdom until 1707; however, there is no record of a Jewish presence in Scotland before the 18th century. Jews were also not banned in Wales at the time, but England eventually annexed Wales under Henry VIII. When Henry VIII's England annexed Wales, the English ban on Jews extended to Wales. There is only one known record of a Jew in Wales between 1290 and the annexation, but it is possible individuals did persist there after 1290.

A small community of conversos was identified in Bristol in 1609 and banished. In 1656, Oliver Cromwell made it clear that the ban on Jewish settlement in England and Wales would no longer be enforced, but when Rabbi Manasseh Ben Israel brought a petition to allow Jews to return, the majority of the Protectorate Government turned it down. Despite the Protectorate government's rejection of the Rabbi's petition, the community considers 1656 to mark the readmission of the Jews to England and Wales. In mid-nineteenth century British-ruled Ireland, Daniel O'Connell, known as "The Liberator" for his work on Catholic Emancipation, worked successfully for the repeal of the "De Judaismo" law, which prescribed a special yellow badge for Jews. Benjamin Disraeli (1804–1881), of Jewish birth although he joined the Church of England, served in government for three decades, twice as prime minister.

The oldest Jewish community in Britain is the Spanish and Portuguese Jewish community, which traces back to the 1630s when it existed clandestinely in London before the readmission and was unofficially legitimised in 1656, which is the date counted by the Jewish community as the re-admittance of the Jews to England (which at the time included Wales). A trickle of Ashkenazi immigration primarily from German countries continued from the late 17th century to the early 19th century, incrementally growing the population from 8,000 in the middle of the eighteenth century, to 35,000 in 1860, to 60,000 by 1880. As for the second wave of Ashkenazi immigration, a large wave of Ashkenazi Jewish immigrants fleeing persecution in the Russian Empire due to pogroms and the May Laws between 1880 and the imposition of tighter immigration restrictions in 1905 sought their way to the Isles, which rose the population further to 250,000 by 1914 and then 350,000 by start of the Second World War. Many German and Polish Jews seeking to escape the Nazi Holocaust arrived in Britain before and after the Second World War.

During the Second World War, approximately 60,000—70,000 British Jews (of a total population of approximately 370,000) served in the British Army, representing a higher proportion than the general population. British Jews served in all branches and theatres of war, including as pilots during the Battle of Britain, and were overrepresented in elite forces like the Parachute Regiment and Royal Air Force aircrew.

More than 3,000 British Jewish servicemen and women lost their lives in the war and many others received decorations for bravery and conduct, with three Victoria Crosses, 168 Military Crosses and 188 Distinguished Flying Crosses awarded to Jewish personnel during the war. Many European Jewish refugees who had fled Nazi persecution also served in the British Army during the war.

The Jewish Brigade Group was formed in 1944 and fought with distinction in the Spring 1945 Offensive in Italy. The group was largely recruited from Old Yishuv Jews in British Mandatory Palestine and commanded by British-Jewish officers. They received 7 Military Medals, 7 Order of the British Empire medals, 4 Military Crosses, and 2 US awards. The group was formally disbanded in the summer of 1946.

Following de-colonisation, the late twentieth century saw Yemeni Jews, Iraqi Jews, and Baghdadi Jews settle in the United Kingdom. A multicultural community, in 2006 British Jews celebrated the 350th anniversary of the resettlement in England.

== Demographics ==
=== Population size ===
Historical British Jewish population
Year	Pop.	±%
1734	6,000	—
1800	17,500	+191.7%
1881	60,000	+242.9%
1900	250,000	+316.7%
1933	300,000	+20.0%
1938	370,000	+23.3%
1945	450,000	+21.6%
1980	330,000	−26.7%
2001	266,740	−19.2%
2011	269,568	+1.1%
2021	277,613	+3.0%
Source: Data from 2001 onwards derived from the UK Census: Data prior to 2001 based on estimates; these come from the Jewish Encyclopedia of 1901-1906, the US Holocaust Museum, and Jews in Britain-Origin and Growth of Anglo Jewry (1943)

According to the 2021 United Kingdom census, there were 271,327 Jews in England and Wales, or 0.5% of the overall population, whilst in the 2021 Northern Irish census, there were 439 self-identified Jews constituting just 0.02% of the population, but marking a 31% increase in numbers since the census of 2011. According to the 2011 census, 5,887 Jews lived in Scotland for a total of 277,653 self-identified Jews in the United Kingdom. This does not include much smaller communities in the Crown Dependencies and Overseas Territories; notably, there are Jewish communities in Gibraltar, Jersey and Bermuda, amongst others. However, this final figure is considered an undercount. Demographers David Graham and Stanley Waterman give several reasons as for why: the underenumeration for censuses in general; the question did not record secular Jews; the voluntary nature of the question; suspicion by Jews of such questions; and the high non-response rate for large numbers of Haredi Jews. By comparison, the Jewish Virtual Library estimated a Jewish population of 291,000 (not limited to adherents of Judaism) in 2012, making Britain's Jewish community the fifth largest in the world. This equates to 0.43% of the population of the United Kingdom. The absolute number of Jews has been gradually rising since records began; in the 2011 census, 263,346 people in England and Wales answered "Jewish" to the voluntary question on religion, compared with 259,927 in of 2001.

The 2001 Census included a (voluntary) religion question ("What is your religion?") for the first time in its history; (Note: The question had appeared in the past several censuses in Northern Ireland. In Scotland there were two questions: "What religion, religious denomination or body do you belong to?" and "What religion, religious denomination or body were you brought up in?".) 266,740 people listed their religion as "Jewish". However, the subject of who is a Jew is complex, and the religion question did not record people who may be Jewish through other means, such as ethnically and culturally. Of people who chose Jewish as their religion, 97% put White as their ethnic group. However, a report by the Institute for Jewish Policy Research (JPR) suggests that, although there was an apparent option to write down "Jewish" for this question, it did not occur to many, because of "skin colour" and nationality bias, and that if "Jewish" was an explicit option, the results—only 2,594 respondents were Jewish solely by ethnicity—would have been different. The religion question appeared in the 2011 Census, but there was still no explicit option for "Jewish" in the ethnic-group question. The Board of Deputies had encouraged all Jews to indicate they were Jewish, either through the religion question or the ethnicity one.

From 2005 to 2008, the Jewish population increased from 275,000 to 280,000, attributed largely to the high birth rates of Haredi (or ultra-Orthodox) Jews. Research by the University of Manchester in 2007 showed that 75% of British Jewish births were to the Haredi community. Ultra-Orthodox women have an average of 6.9 children, and secular Jewish women 1.65. In 2015, the Institute for Jewish Policy Research reported that in England the orthodox community was growing by nearly 5% per year, while the non-haredi community was decreasing by 0.3% per year. It has been also documented that in terms of births, between 2007 and 2015, the estimated number of Ultra-Orthodox births per annum increased by 35%, rising from 1,431 to 1,932. Meanwhile, the estimated number of 'Mainstream' (non-Ultra-Orthodox) births per annum increased to a lesser extent over the same period, going from 1,844 to 1,889 (+2.4%).

=== Historical population ===
Going into the 19th century, the Jewish population was small, likely no more than 20,000 individuals. However, the population quadrupled in just a few decades after 1881 as a large number of Jews fled oppression in the Russian Empire. The population increased by as much as 50% between 1933 and 1945, with the United Kingdom admitting around 70,000 Jews between 1933 and 1938, and a further 80,000 between 1938 and 1945. The late 1940s and early 1950s proved to be the high point, numerically speaking, for British Jewry. A decline followed, as many of the new arrivals moved to Israel, moved back to Europe, or emigrated elsewhere, and many other individuals assimilated. The decline continued into the 1990s, but has since reversed. The estimates given before the 2001 Census are likely not directly comparable to the Census, as the Census is based purely on self-identification, whereas the estimates are based on community membership, and it is probably the decline from 450,000 to 266,740 is more like a decline from 450,000 to somewhere between 300,000 and 350,000 going by the metrics of the estimators. Contemporary Jewish demographers like Sergio DellaPergola give figures around 300,000 for the British Jewish population in the early 2010s, since when it has grown.

==== Migration ====
The great majority (83.2%) of Jews in England and Wales were born in the UK. In 2015, about 6% of Jews in England held an Israeli passport. In 2019, the Office for National Statistics estimated that 21,000 people resident in the UK were born in Israel, up from 11,890 in 2001. Of the 21,000, 8,000 had Israeli nationality.

In 2013, it was reported that antisemitic attacks in France led to an exodus of French Jews to the UK. This has resulted in some synagogues establishing French-language Shabbat services.

In 2018, 534 Britons emigrated to Israel, representing the third consecutive annual decline. The figure was one third down on 2015 and was the lowest for five years. Meanwhile, immigration of Jews from Israel is consistently higher than emigration of Jews to Israel, at a ratio of about 3:2, meaning the British Jewish community has a net gain of Jewish immigrants, to the point Israelis now represent around 6% of the British Jewish community. As of 2025, only about 1% of all British Jews made aliyah over the past seven years. However, the Institute for Jewish Policy Research warned that rising levels of antisemitism in Britain were causing many British Jews to be more receptive to the option of moving to Israel.

==== Ethnicity ====
Jews in England and Wales by ethnic group and nationality
Ethnic group	2001		2011		2021	
Ethnic group	Number	%	Number	%	Number	%
White	249,483	96.82	241,356	92.37	230,399	85.56
– British	216,403	84.00	200,934	76.90	180,325	66.96
– Irish	1,134	0.44	1,116	0.43	927	0.34
– Irish Traveller			241	0.09	161	0.06
– Roma					178	0.07
– Other White	31,946	12.40	39,065	14.95	48,808	18.12
Mixed	3,038	1.18	4,209	1.61	6,029	2.24
– White and Asian	828	0.32	1,229	0.47	1,190	0.44
– White and Black Caribbean	379	0.15	778	0.30	780	0.29
– White and Black African	181	0.07	424	0.16	442	0.16
– Other Mixed	1,650	0.64	1,778	0.86	3,617	1.34
Asian	1,968	0.76	2,750	1.05	1,526	0.57
– Indian	663	0.26	816	0.31	557	0.21
– Chinese	104	0.04	324	0.12	159	0.06
– Pakistani	353	0.14	433	0.17	261	0.10
– Bangladeshi	124	0.05	222	0.08	83	0.03
– Other Asian	724	0.28	955	0.37	466	0.17
Black	893	0.35	1,591	0.61	1,611	0.60
– Caribbean	535	0.21	611	0.23	649	0.24
– African	236	0.09	499	0.19	709	0.26
– Other Black	122	0.05	481	0.18	253	0.09
Other		11,376		29,719		
– Arab			564	0.22	422	0.16
– Other Ethnic group	2,289	0.89	10,812	4.14	29,297	10.88
TOTAL	257,671	100.0	261,282	100.0	269,293	100.0

=== Geographic distribution ===
The majority of the Jews in the UK live in southeastern England, particularly in and around Greater London. Around 145,480 Jews live in London itself - more than half the Jewish population of the entire country - notably the London boroughs of Barnet (56,620), Hackney (17,430), Camden (10,080), Haringey (9,400), Harrow (7,300), Redbridge (6,410), Westminster (5,630), Brent (3,720), Enfield (3,710), Islington (2,710) and Kensington and Chelsea (2,680). There are also 30,220 Jews living in districts close to London, including 21,270 in southern Hertfordshire and 4,930 in southwestern Essex, giving a total population of 175,690 Jews in London and the districts and boroughs immediately surrounding it, as compared to 95,640 in the rest of England and Wales combined.

In total, including communities some distance from London, just under 46,000 Jews live in the six counties bordering Greater London, of which two-thirds live in areas immediately adjacent to London. There are, in total, more than 26,400 Jews in Hertfordshire, of which 18,350 are in the borough of Hertsmere in southwestern Hertfordshire adjacent to Jewish areas in Barnet and Harrow. Towns and villages in Hertsmere with large Jewish populations include Borehamwood (6,160), Bushey (5,590), and Radlett (2,980). Some 30% of Radlett's population is Jewish, as is 20% of Bushey's and 17% of Borehamwood's, 21% of neighbouring Shenley's and 36% of nearby Elstree, which has a Jewish plurality. Further afield from London, there is also a significant community in St Albans, as well as other smaller communities throughout the county. There are over 10,300 Jews in Essex, of which 4,380 live in the district of Epping Forest, in the county's southwest. There is also a significant community in Southend. In total, London and the counties around it are host to 70.56% of England and Wales' Jewish population, as of 2021.

The next most significant population is in Greater Manchester, a community of more than 28,000, mostly in Bury (10,730), Salford (10,370), Manchester (2,630), and Trafford (2,410). There are also significant communities in Leeds (6,270), Gateshead (2,910), Brighton (2,460), St Albans (2,240), and Southend (2,060). Some historically sizeable communities like Liverpool, Bournemouth and Birmingham have experienced a steady decline and now number fewer than 2,000 self-identifying Jews each; conversely, there are small but growing communities in places like Bristol, Oxford and Cambridge.

The most Jewish county in the UK is Hertfordshire, which is 2.23% Jewish; this is followed by the City of London, at 2.06%, and then Greater London at 1.63%. Greater Manchester is 1.00% Jewish, Essex is 0.70% and East Sussex is 0.65%. No other county is as much as 0.50% Jewish. The least Jewish county or principal area in England and Wales is Merthyr Tydfil, which is less than 0.01% Jewish despite once having had a significant community. Hertsmere and Barnet councils are the most Jewish local authorities in England, with Jews composing one in six and seven residents respectively. Finchley and Golders Green is the political constituency with the largest Jewish population in the UK.

The Scottish population is concentrated in Greater Glasgow, which counts around 2,500 Jews. Around 30% of the Scottish Jewish population, or around 1,510 people, resides in East Renfrewshire, largely in or around the Glasgow suburb of Newton Mearns. Glasgow itself has around 970 Jews. Edinburgh counts 1,270 Jews; the remaining 35% of Scottish Jewry is scattered throughout the country. The largest Welsh community is in Cardiff, with almost 700 Jews, constituting about a third of the Welsh Jewish population and 0.19% of the population of Cardiff itself. The only synagogue in Northern Ireland is in Belfast, where the community has fewer than 100 active members, although 439 people recorded their religion as Jewish in the Northern Irish census of 2021; despite remarkable growth since the previous census in 2011, this still leaves the Northern Irish community as the smallest of the four Home Nations both in overall numbers and percentage terms. There are small communities throughout the Channel Islands, and there is an active synagogue in St Brelade, Jersey, although the Jewish population of the island is only 49. There is only a small number of Jews on the Isle of Man, with no synagogue.

=== Age profile ===
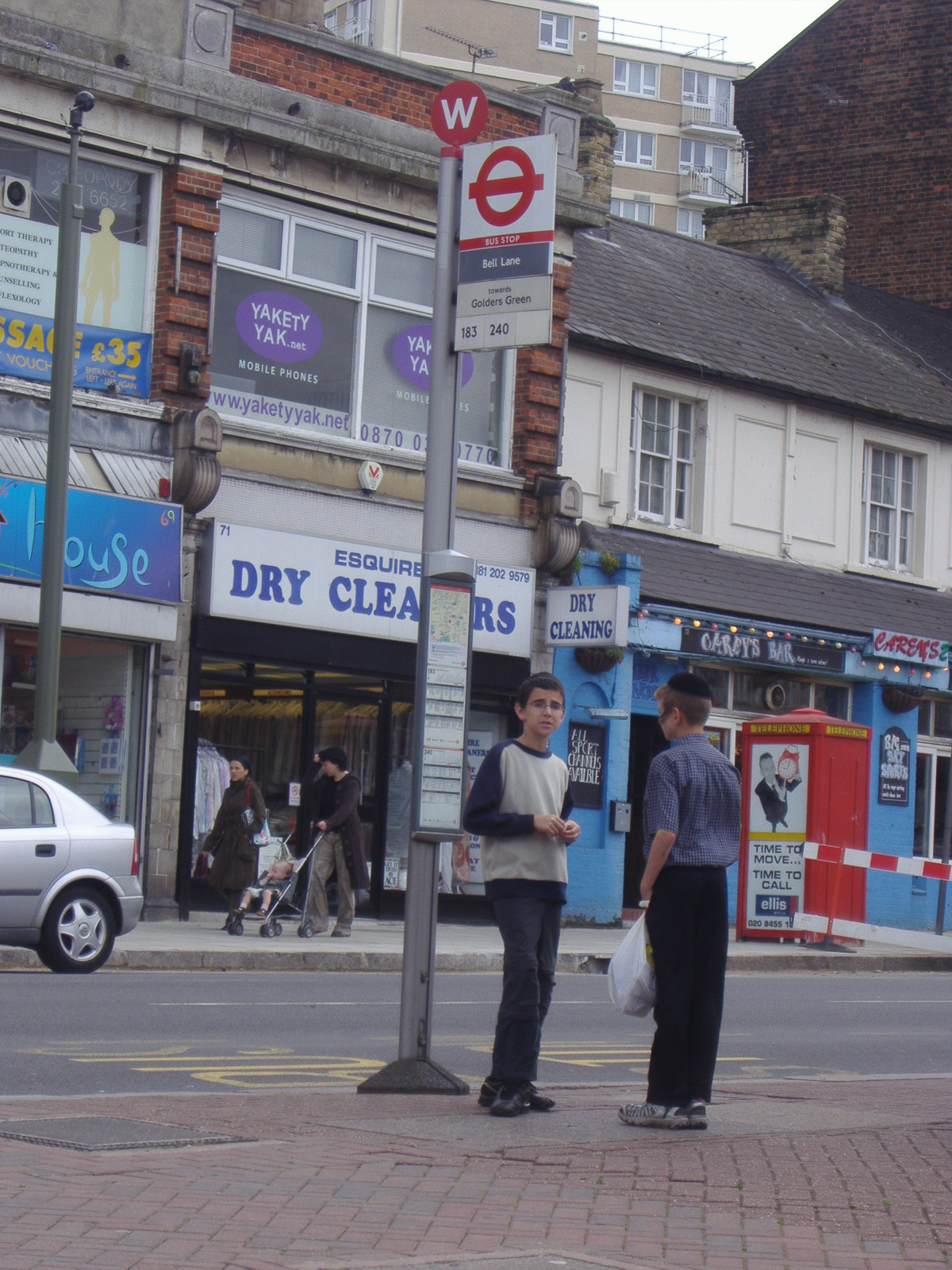
Two boys with kippot at a bus stop in Hendon, north London

The British Jewish population has an older profile than the general population. In England and Wales, the median age of male Jews is 41.2, while the figure for all males is 36.1; Jewish females have a median age of 44.3, while the figure for all females is 38.1. About 24% of the community are over the age of 65 (compared to 16% of the general population of England and Wales). In the 2001 census, Jews were the only group in which the number of persons in the 75-plus cohorts outnumbered those in the 65–74 cohort.

=== Education ===
As of February 2025, there are 136 Jewish schools in the UK, a net increase of 3 schools since 2021. The total figure is composed of 45 mainstream Jewish schools and 91 strictly Orthodox schools. 36,064 Jewish pupils studied in these schools in the academic year 2023/24. The composition of the sector has shifted over time: whereas in the 1990s the majority of Jewish school pupils were in the mainstream sector, today around 60% of pupils in Jewish schools are in schools serving the strictly Orthodox community, with around 40% in the mainstream sector.

Jewish day schools and yeshivas are found throughout the country. Jewish cultural studies and Hebrew language instruction are commonly offered at synagogues in the form of supplementary Hebrew schools or Sunday schools.

Jewish schools often rank among the top in the country for academic achievement and British Jews generally have high levels of educational achievement. For example, at JFS (a prominent London Jewish school), 55% of all A-level grades in 2025 were at A*–A, and 84% were at A–B. Several Jewish schools also reported more than half of GCSE exams passed at grades 9 to 7 (the highest range) in 2025, with Immanuel College seeing 71.4% at this top level. British Jews were more likely to report a Level 4 or above qualification as their highest level of qualification compared with the population of England and Wales (50.7% compared with 33.8%).

Security is a prominent concern for Jewish educational institutions in the United Kingdom. All Jewish schools operate under security guidance provided by the Community Security Trust (CST), which works in partnership with the Home Office and the Department for Education. The government funds security guards and protective measures through the Jewish Community Protective Security Grant, first introduced in 2015 and renewed annually. Typical arrangements include controlled entry systems, perimeter surveillance, and on-site guards during school hours. These measures have been significantly expanded with greater government funding following increases in antisemitic incidents reported by the CST, particularly during periods of tension in the Middle East.

The majority of Jewish schools in Britain are funded by the government. Jewish educational centres are plentiful, large-scale projects. One of the country's most famous Jewish schools is the state-funded JFS in London which opened in 1732 and has about 2,100 students. It is heavily over-subscribed and applies strict rules on admissions, which led to a discrimination court case, R (E) v Governing Body of JFS, in 2009. In 2011, another large state-funded school opened in North London named JCoSS, the first cross-denomination Jewish secondary school in the UK. However, some of the all-day educational establishments in the Haredi community of Stamford Hill have been accused of neglecting secular skills such as English and maths, but claim not to be schools under the technical meaning of the Department for Education.

The annual Limmud educational charity produces a large annual winter festival and several other regional events throughout the year on the theme of Jewish learning. The Union of Jewish Students is an umbrella organisation that represents Jewish students at university, totalling more than 9,000 university students and 75 university Jewish Societies.

=== Economics ===
According to the 2021 UK census, of people aged 16–64 who identified as Jewish, 17.5% were self-employed compared with 11.3% in the general population. By contrast 55.2% of Jewish-identified individuals in this age band were in employee roles, compared with 59.6% of the wider population. As of 2019, employees who identified as Jewish had the highest median hourly earnings of all religious groups in England and Wales in both 2012 and 2018 (£15.17 and £19.22 respectively). In 2018, among Jewish people in employment, 46% were employed in high-skill occupations in England and Wales, and 40% of employees who identified as Jewish reported being employed as a manager, the highest such share reported across all religious groups.

The 2001 UK Census showed that 30.5% of economically active Jews were self-employed, compared to a figure of 14.2% for the general population. Jews aged 16–24 were less likely to be economically active than their counterparts in the general population; 89.2% of these were students. In a 2010 study, average income per working adult was £15.44 an hour. Median income and wealth were significantly higher than other religious groups.

Home ownership remains high in the Jewish population. The 2021 census for England and Wales recorded 72.3% of Jews either owning their home with a mortgage (32.5%) or outright (39.8%). 20.9% rent privately or live rent free and the remaining 6.8% live in social housing.

=== Marriage ===
In 2016, the Institute for Jewish Policy Research (JPR) reported that the interfaith marriage rate for the Jewish community in the United Kingdom was 26 percent. This was less than half the rate found among American Jews, which stood at 58 percent, and showed relatively little change from the British rate of 23 percent in the early 1980s. The figure, however, was more than twice the 11 percent rate recorded in the late 1960s. The study also found that around one third of the children of mixed Jewish–non-Jewish marriages are brought up in the Jewish faith.

Patterns of interfaith marriage differ significantly by age, denomination, and geography. Rates are highest among secular or non-affiliated Jews and among those living outside the main Jewish population centres of London and Manchester, and lowest among Orthodox Jews, where intermarriage is rare. Younger cohorts of Jews who identify culturally rather than religiously are more likely to marry outside the faith than older generations.

The same JPR report noted that cohabitation without marriage was relatively uncommon among British Jews compared to the general population, though more prevalent among the least religiously observant. Divorce rates were similar to national averages, but considerably lower among strictly Orthodox Jews.

== Religion ==
There are around 454 synagogues in the country, and it is estimated that 56.3% of all households across the UK with at least one Jew living within them held synagogue membership in 2016. The percentage of households adhering to specific denominations is as follows:

- Orthodox ("consisting of the United Synagogue, the Federation of Synagogues and independent Orthodox synagogues") – 42.8%
- Strictly Orthodox ("synagogues aligned with the Union of Orthodox Hebrew Congregations and others of a similar ethos") – 23.5%
- Reform (Movement for Reform Judaism and Westminster Synagogue and Chaim V'Tikvah and Hastings and District Jewish Society) – 19.3%
- Liberal (Liberal Judaism and Belsize Square Synagogue) – 8.2%
- Masorti (Assembly of Masorti Synagogues) – 3.3%
- Sephardi – 2.9%

In the 2022 Jewish Policy Research national survey, conducted among nearly 5,000 respondents, denominational/practice level identification was as follows:

- Haredi – 7%
- Orthodox – 12%
- Traditional – 27%
- Reform/Progressive – 18%
- "Just Jewish" – 13%
- Non-practising – 19%
- Mixed with another religion – 1%
- Other/none of these – 2.5%

The Stanmore and Canons Park Synagogue in the London Borough of Harrow said in 2015 that it had the largest membership of any single Orthodox synagogue in Europe.

== British Jewish culture ==
=== Media ===
There are a number of Jewish newspapers, magazines and other media published in Britain on a national or regional level. The most well known is The Jewish Chronicle, founded in 1841, and is the world's oldest continuously published Jewish newspaper.

Other publications include the Jewish News, Jewish Telegraph, Hamodia, the Jewish Tribune and Jewish Renaissance.

The Jewish Chronicle has traditionally combined coverage of British and international Jewish affairs with cultural commentary and opinion pieces. Jewish News is a free weekly newspaper based in London that focuses on community events, British politics, and Jewish cultural life. The Jewish Telegraph, published from Manchester, has regional editions for Leeds, Glasgow, and Liverpool, reflecting the historic distribution of Jewish communities across northern England and Scotland. The strictly Orthodox community is served by titles such as Hamodia and the Jewish Tribune, while Jewish Renaissance is a quarterly magazine devoted to Jewish arts and culture.

In April 2020, The Jewish Chronicle and the Jewish News, which had announced plans to merge in February and later announced plans for a joint liquidation, continued as separate entities after the former was acquired by a consortium with a charitable trust established to steer the newspaper.

=== Food ===
Cookbooks grew in popularity in Britain during the mid-19th century and began to shape the domestic cooking practices of Jewish households, particularly by guiding and inspiring women in their kitchens. As Jewish communities in Britain were formed largely by successive waves of migration, from early Sephardi arrivals in the seventeenth century to Ashkenazi immigrants from Central and Eastern Europe in the nineteenth, their cuisine reflected a fusion of traditions adapted to local British ingredients and tastes but is mostly drawn from Ashkenazi cuisine.

Early Anglo-Jewish cookbooks, such as The Jewish Manual (1846) by Judith Montefiore, sought to reconcile the requirements of kashrut with the conventions of Victorian dining, introducing readers to both traditional Sabbath dishes and new, Anglicised preparations. In London’s East End, where many Ashkenazi immigrants settled, distinctive dishes emerged that became hallmarks of British Jewish cuisine. Among these were fried gefilte fish balls, served hot and crisp rather than poached in aspic as on the continent, and corned beef, which consisted of brined and boiled brisket served with mustard and pickles in a chewy beigel, rather than pastrami as is more common elsewhere. That dish became an icon of the area's delicatessens. Other staples included chopped herring, egg and onion, lockshen pudding (a sweet noodle kugel), kneidlach (matzo balls), and cholent, the slow-cooked Sabbath stew traditionally made with beans, barley, and potatoes.

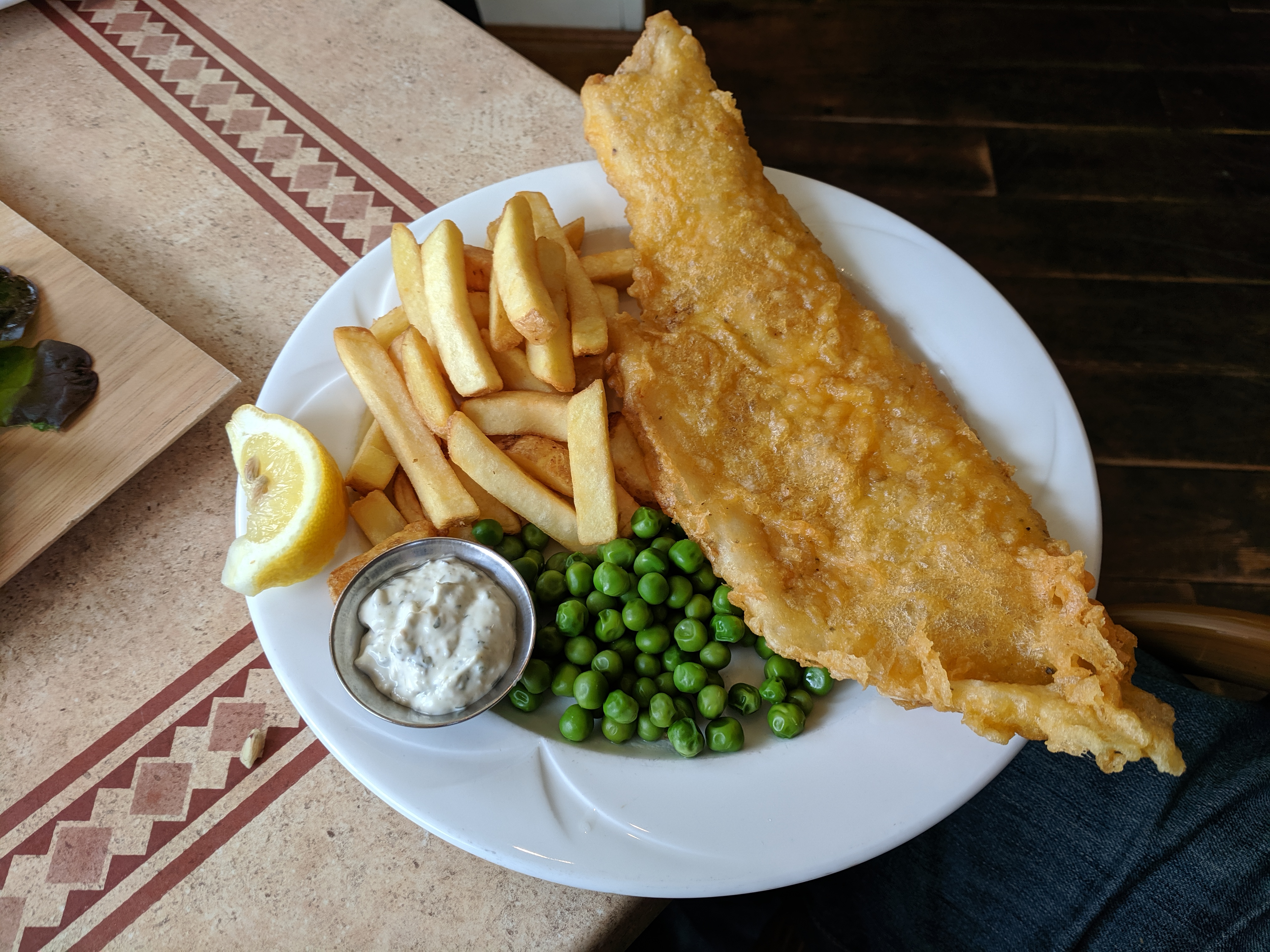
Fish and chips

Fish and chips, often considered Britain's national dish, was likely introduced to the country through the Chuts and Spanish and Portuguese Jews who lived in the Netherlands before settling in the UK in the 16th and 17th centuries. The earliest known fish and chip shops were opened in London during the 1860s by Eastern European Jewish immigrant Joseph Malin, and by John Lees in Mossley, Lancashire.

Sephardi communities contributed their own influences, particularly through the Spanish and Portuguese Jews of London and later arrivals from Iraq and the Mediterranean. Their cooking introduced bourekas, spiced meatballs, fried aubergines, and almond pastries, along with seasonings such as cinnamon, allspice, and amba, a tangy mango pickle.

Today, British Jewish cuisine continues to evolve. Traditional East End fare survives in long-established shops such as the Brick Lane Beigel Bake and Golders Green's Grodzinski Bakery, while modern kosher delis and restaurants have combined classic Ashkenazi comfort food with contemporary British and Israeli influences.

=== Popular culture ===
In comedy, British Jews have been among the most prominent writers and performers. Peter Sellers was one of the central writers and stars of The Goon Show, a landmark in post-war radio comedy, but is best-known for his portrayal of Chief Inspector Clouseau on The Pink Panther series. Later generations included Sacha Baron Cohen, creator of Ali G, Borat, and The Dictator; Stephen Fry, known for A Bit of Fry and Laurie and Jeeves and Wooster; and Matt Lucas and David Baddiel, who brought Jewish humour and identity into mainstream British entertainment. Maureen Lipman and Miriam Margolyes are also well-known Jewish actors with long careers in stage and screen comedy. Other notable Jewish comedians, actors and writers include Simon Amstell, David Schneider, Ben Elton, Helena Bonham Carter, and Daniel Radcliffe.

British Jews have had a strong influence in music and broadcasting. Brian Epstein, the manager of the Beatles, played a decisive role in the global rise of British pop music in the 1960s. Other notable figures include producer Mark Ronson, singer Amy Winehouse, and composer Lionel Bart, best known for the musical Oliver!. In broadcasting, Jewish executives and journalists such as Alan Yentob and Jon Sopel have held senior roles in the BBC and other media institutions.

=== British Jewish literature ===
British-born Jews have made a sustained contribution to post-war British letters across fiction, drama, poetry, and children’s literature. In drama, Harold Pinter of Hackney, the son of Jewish immigrants, became one of the most influential playwrights of the twentieth century and received the 2005 Nobel Prize in Literature. His work is frequently read through the lens of wartime evacuation and antisemitic prejudice in 1930s-40s London.

Alongside Pinter, Oscar Lewenstein, Arnold Wesker and Bernard Kops were central figures in post-war British theatre, associated with socially engaged writing that often drew on East End Jewish experience.

On television and stage, Jack Rosenthal wrote BAFTA-winning works on Jewish family and social life, including Bar Mitzvah Boy, The Evacuees and Oscar-award-winning Yentl.

In fiction, Howard Jacobson is the best-known contemporary Anglo-Jewish novelist; his comic novel The Finkler Question won the 2010 Man Booker Prize and explores Jewish identity in modern Britain.

Earlier Booker laureates include Bernice Rubens, the first woman to win the prize for The Elected Member (1970), and Anita Brookner, who won in 1984 for Hotel du Lac. Prose writers Clive Sinclair and Elaine Feinstein produced notable novels, poems and short stories that engaged Jewish themes and European literary influences.

In poetry, Dannie Abse articulated a Welsh-Jewish voice that became prominent in post-war verse, and is widely considered one of the most important Welsh writers of the past century, also writing novels and plays.

In children’s literature, poet laureate Michael Rosen has been a leading author whose work reflects a London Jewish upbringing, best-known for We're Going on a Bear Hunt (1989) and Sad Book (2004).

=== Business, science and academia ===
From the late nineteenth century onward, Jewish immigrants and their descendants became known for entrepreneurship, education, and social mobility, with many family-run firms contributing to British industry, textiles, and retail. Notable examples include the co-operatively owned department store Marks & Spencer, founded by Michael Marks and Thomas Spencer in the 1880s, and the long-established retailer Burton, founded by Montague Burton in 1903, which became one of the country’s largest tailoring companies. Other major British businesses founded by British Jews include the multinational supermarket chain Tesco, the fashion chains River Island and Debenhams, and the advertising agency Saatchi & Saatchi.

In the twentieth century, British Jews made significant contributions to science and the academy. Among Nobel laureates of Jewish heritage are physicist Max Born, biochemist César Milstein, and molecular biologist Aaron Klug, each of whom conducted pioneering research at British universities. Mathematician Dennis Sciama and biochemist Frederick Sanger were influential mentors to a generation of British scientists. In the humanities and social sciences, Jewish scholars such as Sir Isaiah Berlin, Sir Ernst Gombrich, Sir Geoffrey Elton, and Eric Hobsbawm became leading figures in philosophy, art history, history, and political theory. Contemporary academics including Simon Schama, Sir Jonathan Sacks, Simon Sebag Montefiore and Timothy Garton Ash have maintained a strong presence in British intellectual life and public debate, while theoretical physicist David Deutsch pioneered the field of quantum computing by formulating a description for a quantum Turing machine, as well as specifying an algorithm designed to run on a quantum computer.

Jewish participation in business and finance has also been prominent. The Rothschild family, based in London since the early nineteenth century, played a central role in the development of the City of London as a global financial centre. Later generations of Jewish entrepreneurs contributed to sectors such as property, manufacturing, and media, among them Lord Alan Sugar, Sir Philip Green, and Sir Martin Sorrell.

== Politics ==
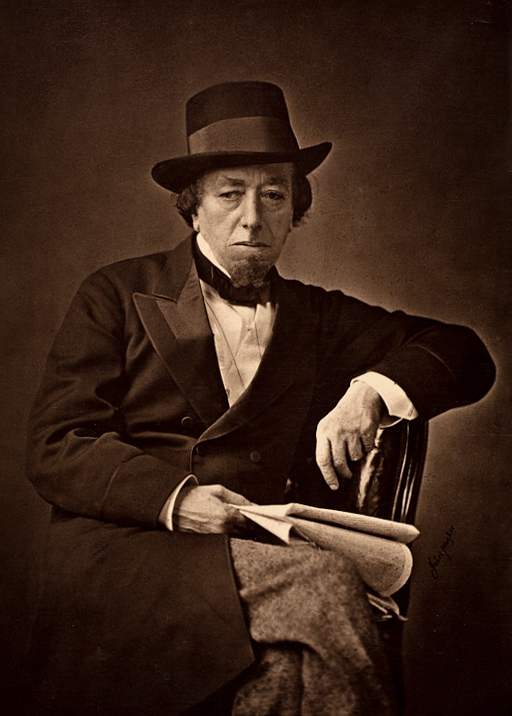
Benjamin Disraeli in 1878, the only Prime Minister who was Jewish by birth; he was otherwise a practicing Christian.

During the 19th century, the British political system was gradually reformed to allow those outside the established Church of England to participate fully in public life. The Roman Catholic Relief Act 1829 removed religious tests that had excluded Roman Catholics from Parliament, and the first Roman Catholics entered the House of Commons in 1832. The Jews Relief Act 1858 later removed the requirement for Members of Parliament to swear a Christian oath, permitting observant Jews to take their seats.

Lionel de Rothschild, first elected in 1847, became the first practising Jewish MP in 1858 after Parliament agreed to amend the oath of allegiance. Earlier, David Salomons had briefly sat in 1851 before being required to withdraw for refusing the Christian declaration. He was the first Jewish Sheriff of the City of London and Lord Mayor of London. Benjamin Disraeli, born Jewish but baptised Anglican, served twice as Prime Minister in the later 19th century, and is widely regarded as one of the most important and influential Conservative Prime Ministers in the United Kingdom’s history.

By the early 20th century, Jewish representation in Parliament had broadened across the political spectrum. Figures such as Herbert Samuel (Liberal), Leslie Hore-Belisha (Conservative and later Liberal), and Manny Shinwell (Labour) served as Cabinet ministers, reflecting the community’s integration into national political life. The Board of Deputies of British Jews, established in 1760, functioned as the main representative body of British Jewry and continues to act as a liaison between the community and government on political and social issues. Many Jews were also active in wider political movements, including trade unionism and opposition to fascism in the 1930s, most notably during the Battle of Cable Street.

By the early 21st century, polls consistently indicated that a majority of British Jews favoured the Conservatives. Ed Miliband, the leader of the Labour Party between 2010-2015, was the first Jewish leader of the Labour Party. Some MPs, such as Robert Jenrick (Conservatives) and Keir Starmer (Labour), while not Jewish themselves, are married to Jews and have Jewish children. Notable British-Jewish politicians include Herbert Samuel, 1st Viscount Samuel, Edwin Montagu, Sir Keith Joseph, John Bercow, and Michael Howard.

Before the 2015 general election, 69% of British Jews surveyed were planning to vote for the Conservative Party, while 22% would vote for the Labour Party. A May 2016 poll of British Jews showed 77% would vote Conservative, 13.4% Labour, and 7.3% Liberal Democrat. An October 2019 poll of British Jews showed 64% would vote Conservative, 24% Liberal Democrat, and only 6% Labour, reflecting broader community concerns about antisemitism in the Labour Party under the leadership of Jeremy Corbyn.

According to polling in 2015, politicians' attitudes towards Israel influence the vote of three out of four British Jews. 80% of British Jews support Israel's right to exist as a Jewish state. 75% of British Jews feel emotionally attached to Israel, with 49% "very attached", and 45% saying Israel is very important to their Jewish identity. 64% identify as Zionists, though younger Jews are more critical of Israel, with 24% of 18-25 year olds identifying as Anti-Zionist and 20% as Non-Zionist.

In London, most of the top constituencies with the largest Jewish populations voted Conservative in the 2010 general election - these are namely, Finchley and Golders Green, Hendon, Harrow East, Chipping Barnet, Ilford North, and Hertsmere in Hertfordshire. The exceptions were Hackney North and Stoke Newington and Hampstead and Kilburn, which both voted Labour in the election. Outside the region, large Jewish constituencies voted for Labour, namely Bury South and Blackley and Broughton.

In a poll by the Institute for Jewish Policy Research (JPR) in 2024, British Jews voted broadly in line with larger national trends, with about 46% support for the Labour Party and 30% support for the Conservative Party, though support for Reform UK was substantially lower (6%) than the national average (15%). In 2025, following the Gaza war, the JPR reported that support for the two major parties, Labour and Conservatives, among British Jews had fallen to 58% in July 2025 from 84% in 2020. Support for the Green party had increased to 18% and Reform UK to 11%, compared to 7% and 28% respectively in the wider population. The JPR executive director said "Reform UK is more likely to attract male, older, orthodox, and Zionist Jews; the Greens are more likely to attract younger, unaffiliated and anti-Zionist [Jews]".

In response to Foreign Secretary Ed Miliband announcing on 8 September 2026 that the United Kingdom would introduce sanctions on goods from illegal settlements in the West Bank to support the prospects of the two-state solution the pro-Zionist Board of Deputies of British Jews and the Jewish Leadership Council condemned the move though other senior rabbis, including from progressive Judaism, supported the move.

Jewish MPs by election 1945–1992
Election	Labour	Conservative	Liberal/Alliance	Other	Total	% of Parliament
1857			1		1	0.2
1859			3		3	0.5
1865					6	0.9
1868						
1874		1				
1880		1	4		5	
1885		3	6		9	1.3
1886					9	1.3
1892						
1895						
1900		7	2		9	1.3
1945	26	0	0	2	28	4.4
1950	23	0	0	0	23	3.7
1951	17	0	0	0	17	2.7
1955	17	1	0	0	18	2.9
1959	20	2	0	0	22	3.5
1964	34	2	0	0	36	5.7
1966	38	2	0	0	40	6.3
1970	31	9	0	0	40	6.3
1974 Feb	33	12	1	0	45	7.2
1974 Oct	35	10	1	0	45	7.2
1979	21	11	1	0	32	5.0
1983	11	17	2	0	30	4.6
1987	7	16	1	0	24	3.7
1992	8	11	1	0	20	3.1
2017	8	11	0	0	19	2.9
2019	5	11	0	0	16	2.5
2024	12	1	0	0	13	2.0

== Antisemitism ==
YouGov Survey 1–2 September 2025, sample size 2245 GB adults
Question	Agree, by vote in 2024 General Election					
Question	All	Con	Lab	LibDem	Reform	Green
I am just as open to having Jewish friends as I am to having friends from other sections of British society	87%	89%	87%	96%	81%	95%
Jewish people are just as loyal to Britain as other British people	66%	70%	70%	76%	61%	73%
Jewish people chase money more than other people do	14%	17%	11%	7%	24%	7%

The earliest Jewish settlement was recorded in 1070, soon after the Norman Conquest. Jews living in England at this time experienced religious discrimination and it is thought that the blood libel which accused Jews of ritual murder originated in Northern England, leading to massacres and increasing discrimination.^{[2]} The Jewish presence continued until King Edward I's Edict of Expulsion in 1290.^{[3]}

Jews were readmitted into the Commonwealth of England, Scotland and Ireland by Oliver Cromwell in 1655, though it is believed that crypto-Jews lived in England during the expulsion.^{[4]} Jews were regularly subjected to discrimination and humiliation which waxed and waned over the centuries, gradually declining.^{[5]}

In the late 19th and early 20th centuries, the number of Jews in Britain greatly increased due to the exodus from Russia, which resulted in a large community forming in the East End of London.^{[6]} Popular sentiment against immigration was used by the British Union of Fascists to incite hatred against Jews, leading to the Battle of Cable Street in 1936, when the fascists were forced to abandon their march through an area with a large Jewish population when the police clearing the way were unable to remove barricades defended by trade unionists, left wing groups and residents.^{[7]}

In the aftermath of the Holocaust, undisguised racial hatred of Jews became unacceptable in British society. Outbursts of antisemitism emanating from far right groups continued, however, leading to the formation of the 43 Group led by Jewish ex-servicemen which broke up fascist meetings from 1945 to early 1950.

Records of antisemitic incidents have been compiled since 1984, although changing reporting practices and levels of reporting make comparison over time difficult. The Community Security Trust (CST) was formed in 1994 to "[protect] British Jews from antisemitism and related threats". It works in conjunction with the police and other authorities to protect Jewish schools, Synagogues, and other community institutions.

Polling data from the Campaign Against Antisemitism reveals that almost half of British Jews have contemplated leaving the UK since the 2023 Hamas attack on Israel due to rising antisemitism.

== Communal institutions ==
British Jewish communal organisations include:

- Anglo-Jewish Association
- Association of Jewish Refugees
- Board of Deputies (1760)
- CCJO René Cassin
- Community Security Trust
- Institute for Jewish Policy Research
- Jewish Board of Guardians
- Jewish Book Council
- Jewish Care
- Jewish Council for Racial Equality
- Jewish Genealogical Society of Great Britain
- Jewish Leadership Council
- JW3 – a London venue
- Kisharon
- League of British Jews
- League of Jewish Women
- Leo Baeck Institute London
- Liberal Judaism
- Limmud
- London Jewish Forum
- London Jewish Cultural Centre
- Maccabaeans
- Mitzvah Day International
- Movement for Reform Judaism
- Norwood
- S&P Sephardi Community
- Scottish Council of Jewish Communities
- Tzelem
- UCL Institute of Jewish Studies
- UK Jewish Film Festival
- Union of Jewish Students
- United Restitution Organization
- United Synagogue
- Union of Jewish Women
- World Jewish Relief

== See also ==
- List of British Jews
- List of Jewish communities in the United Kingdom
- History of the Jews in England
- History of the Jews in Scotland
- History of the Jews in Ireland
- History of the Jews in the Isle of Man
- Emancipation of the Jews in the United Kingdom
- Gerim

== Sources ==
- "Report of the All-Party Parliamentary Inquiry into Antisemitism" (PDF). Archived from the original (PDF) on 22 August 2013. (430 KB). All-Party Parliamentary Group against Antisemitism. September 2006. Accessed 1 April 2011. 24 November 2010. See inquiry website.
- "The Future of Jewish Schools" (PDF). (995 KB). Jewish Leadership Council. 2008. Accessed 4 April 2011.
- Graham, David; Schmool, Marlena; Waterman, Stanley (18 May 2007), Jews in Britain: A Snapshot from the 2001 Census (PDF), Institute for Jewish Policy Research, archived from the original (PDF) on 26 July 2011, 4.93 MiB. See webpage.
- Graham, David; Vulkan, Daniel (13 May 2010), Synagogue membership in the United Kingdom in 2010 (PDF), Institute for Jewish Policy Research, archived from the original (PDF) on 26 July 2011, 2.68 MiB. See webpage.
- Casale Mashiah, Donatella; Boyd, Jonathan (14 July 2017), Synagogue membership in the United Kingdom in 2016, Institute for Jewish Research
