= 2021 Booker Prize =

British literary award given in 2021

- Date: 3 November 2021
- Location: BBC Radio Theatre, London
- Country: United Kingdom & Ireland

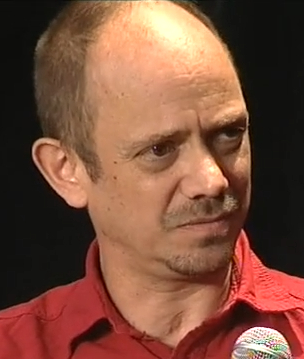
Damon Galgut, winner of the 2021 Booker Prize

The 2021 Booker Prize for Fiction was announced on 3 November 2021, during a ceremony at the BBC Radio Theatre. The longlist was announced on 27 July 2021. The shortlist was announced on 14 September 2021. The Prize – which was chosen from 158 novels published in the UK or Ireland between 1 October 2020 and 30 September 2021 – was awarded to Damon Galgut for his novel, The Promise, receiving £50,000. Shortlisted twice before (in 2003 and 2010), Galgut is the third South African to win the prize, after J. M. Coetzee and Nadine Gordimer.

== Judging panel ==
- Rowan Williams
- Horatia Harrod
- Natascha McElhone
- Chigozie Obioma
- Maya Jasanoff (chair)

== Nominees ==
indicates the winner

=== Shortlist ===
Author	Title	Genre(s)	Country	Publisher
Damon Galgut	The Promise	Novel	South Africa	Jonathan Cape
Anuk Arudpragasam	A Passage North	Novel	Sri Lanka	Granta Books
Patricia Lockwood	No One Is Talking About This	Novel	United States	Bloomsbury Publishing/Bloomsbury Circus
Nadifa Mohamed	The Fortune Men	Novel	Somalia / United Kingdom	Viking / Penguin General / PRH
Richard Powers	Bewilderment	Novel	United States	Hutchinson Heinemann
Maggie Shipstead	Great Circle	Novel	United States	Doubleday/Transworld Publishers

=== Longlist ===
Author	Title	Genre(s)	Country	Publisher
Anuk Arudpragasam	A Passage North	Novel	Sri Lanka	Granta Books
Rachel Cusk	Second Place	Novel	UK/Canada	Faber & Faber
Damon Galgut	The Promise	Novel	South Africa	Jonathan Cape
Nathan Harris	The Sweetness of Water	Novel	United States	Tinder Press
Kazuo Ishiguro	Klara and the Sun	Novel	United Kingdom	Faber & Faber
Karen Jennings	An Island	Novel	South Africa	Holland House Books
Mary Lawson	A Town Called Solace	Novel	Canada	Chatto & Windus / Vintage / PRH
Patricia Lockwood	No One Is Talking About This	Novel	United States	Bloomsbury Publishing/Bloomsbury Circus
Nadifa Mohamed	The Fortune Men	Novel	Somalia / United Kingdom	Viking / Penguin General / PRH
Richard Powers	Bewilderment	Novel	United States	Hutchinson Heinemann
Sunjeev Sahota	China Room	Novel	United Kingdom	Harvill Secker / Vintage / PRH
Maggie Shipstead	Great Circle	Novel	United States	Doubleday/Transworld Publishers
Francis Spufford	Light Perpetual	Novel	United Kingdom	Faber & Faber

== See also ==
- List of winners and shortlisted authors of the Booker Prize for Fiction
