= The Promise (Galgut novel) =

2021 novel by Damon Galgut

- First edition cover (Umuzi, 2021)
- Author: Damon Galgut
- Language: English
- Genre: Family saga
- Set in: South Africa
- Publisher: Umuzi
- Publication date: May 2021
- Publication place: Cape Town
- Media type: Print (paperback)
- Pages: 242
- Awards: Booker Prize (2021)
- ISBN: 978-1-4152-1058-1 (First edition paperback)
- OCLC: 1261301351

The Promise is a 2021 novel by South African novelist Damon Galgut, published in May 2021, by Umuzi, an imprint of Penguin Random House South Africa. It was published by Europa Editions in the US and by Chatto & Windus in the UK.

The novel was awarded the 2021 Booker Prize, making Galgut the third South African to win the Prize.

== Plot ==
The Promise is a family saga spanning four decades, each of which features a death in the family. It concerns the Afrikaner Swart family and their farm located outside Pretoria. The family consists of Manie, his wife Rachel, and their children Anton, Astrid, and Amor.

In 1986, Rachel dies after a long battle with cancer. Before dying, she expresses her dying wish to Manie that their black domestic servant, Salome, be given ownership of the house and plot of land on which she resides on the family's property. This promise, overheard by a young Amor, is made by Manie, but he claims no memory of having made it at the wake, and shows no intention of fulfilling it, especially as Salome cannot legally own property under the country's Apartheid laws.

In 1995, post-Apartheid, the siblings reunite at the family farm after Manie suffers a fatal snakebite. Anton has spent 10 years living a transient lifestyle after absconding from the army in 1986. Astrid is now married with twins, and Amor has lived in England for several years. Although she is now legally able to own her house, the will does not make provision for Salome, and instead makes the three siblings co-owners of the land. Anton moves back in to the farmhouse and assures Amor he will follow through on the promise.

In 2004, Anton is in a loveless marriage with his childhood sweetheart, Desirée, and heavily in debt, while Astrid is married to her second husband and Amor is working as a nurse in an HIV ward in Durban, where she lives with her long-term girlfriend. Despite Amor's appeals, the promise has not been fulfilled, and Astrid and Anton continue to resist her. Secretly, Astrid has been having an affair with her husband's business partner, and after being denied penance by her priest during confession, is murdered in a hijacking. Before Astrid's funeral, Amor makes a final appeal to Anton to fulfil their father's promise, but when she refuses to support his plan to sell some of the land on their farm, the matter is unresolved, and Amor returns to Durban, never to see Anton alive again.

In 2018, Anton - now 50 - has sunk into alcoholism and deep depression due to his failed marriage, impotence, trauma over the killing of a civilian in the army, and the feeling that he has wasted his life. One night, after getting into a fight with Desirée in a drunken stupor, Anton (perhaps accidentally) kills himself. Amor, now in her early 40s and living alone in Cape Town after leaving her girlfriend and her job in Durban, is finally informed of his death by Salome. Now the only surviving member of her family, she gifts the now-derelict family farm to Desirée, minus Salome's house, which she legally transfers to her, finally fulfilling her mother's promise. However, a recent land claim on the plot by a family that was forcibly removed during the apartheid era means that Salome might lose her ownership shortly after acquiring it. Amor also gives Salome her share of her father's inheritance, which she has refused to touch up to this point.

== Style and themes ==
Galgut's modernist style and narration have been compared to the tradition of William Faulkner, Virginia Woolf and James Joyce. Jon Day of The Guardian characterised the novel's narrator as occupying "an indistinct space, halfway between first and third person, drifting from tight focus on a single character to a more piercing, detached view, often within a single paragraph. There's plenty of free indirect discourse, and sections written in something approaching Joycean stream of consciousness."

The moral failings of the Swart family has been interpreted as being an allegory for post-apartheid South Africa, and the promise of White South Africans to Black South Africans. Jon Day wrote that "as members of the family find reasons to deny or defer Salome's inheritance, the moral promise – the potential, or expectation – of the next generation of South Africans, and of the nation itself, is shown to be just as compromised as that of their parents."

Although Galgut himself denied that it was consciously based on the book, many critics also picked up on the novel's narrative and thematic similarities with (and parallels to) E. M. Forster's Howards End.

== Reception ==
The Promise was awarded the 2021 Booker Prize. Galgut is the third writer from South Africa to win the Booker, following Nadine Gordimer and J. M. Coetzee, who has won twice. Galgut was previously shortlisted twice for the Prize: first in 2003 for The Good Doctor and again in 2010 for In a Strange Room. The novel was also longlisted for the 2022 Andrew Carnegie Medal for Excellence in Fiction.

In a rave review for Harper's Magazine, Claire Messud called Galgut an "extraordinary" novelist, writing, "Like other remarkable novels, it is uniquely itself, and greater than the sum of its parts. The Promise evokes when you reach the final page, a profound interior shift that is all but physical. This, as an experience of art, happens only rarely, and is to be prized." James Wood of The New Yorker praised Galgut's narration, writing, "Galgut is at once very close to his troubled characters and somewhat ironically distant, as if the novel were written in two time signatures, fast and slower. And, miraculously, this narrative distance does not alienate our intimacy but emerges as a different form of knowing." In Literary Review, David Isaacs emphasizes Galgut's skilful positioning of his characters, which "allows for a combination of caricature and depth: the Swart family are at once totemic and singular."

The Promise was included on the "Big Jubilee Read" list of 70 books selected by a panel of experts, and announced by the BBC and The Reading Agency in April 2022, to celebrate the Platinum Jubilee of Elizabeth II in June 2022.

== Stage production ==
Galgut and Sylvaine Strike adapted the novel into a stage production. It was shown at The Star Theatre at the District Six Homecoming Centre in Cape Town (formerly the Fugard Theatre) from 14 September to 6 October 2023, before moving to the Market Theatre in Johannesburg from 18 October to 5 November 2023.
