= The Jewish Tribune =

The Jewish Tribune can refer to:

- The Jewish Tribune (Canada)
- Jewish Tribune (UK)
