= 2010 Man Booker Prize =

Literary award

The 2010 Booker Prize for Fiction was awarded at a ceremony on 12 October 2010. The Man Booker longlist of 13 books was announced on 27 July, and was narrowed down to a shortlist of six on 7 September. The Man Booker Prize was awarded to Howard Jacobson for The Finkler Question.

== Judging panel ==
- Sir Andrew Motion (Chair)
- Rosie Blau
- Deborah Bull
- Tom Sutcliffe
- Frances Wilson

== Nominees (Shortlist) ==
Author	Title	Genre(s)	Country	Publisher
Peter Carey	Parrot and Olivier in America	Novel	Australia	Faber and Faber
Emma Donoghue	Room	Novel	Canada	Picador
Damon Galgut	In a Strange Room	Novel	South Africa	Atlantic Books
Howard Jacobson	The Finkler Question	Novel	UK	Bloomsbury
Andrea Levy	The Long Song	Novel	UK/Jamaica	Headline Review
Tom McCarthy	C	Novel	UK	Jonathan Cape

== Nominees (Longlist) ==
Author	Title	Genre(s)	Country	Publisher
Peter Carey	Parrot and Olivier in America	Novel	Australia	Faber and Faber
Emma Donoghue	Room	Novel	Canada	Picador
Helen Dunmore	The Betrayal	Novel	UK	Fig Tree
Damon Galgut	In a Strange Room	Novel	South Africa	Atlantic Books
Howard Jacobson	The Finkler Question	Novel	UK	Bloomsbury
Andrea Levy	The Long Song	Novel	UK/Jamaica	Headline Publishing Group
Tom McCarthy	C	Novel	UK	Jonathan Cape
David Mitchell	The Thousand Autumns of Jacob de Zoet	Novel	UK	Sceptre
Lisa Moore	February	Fiction	Canada	Random House
Paul Murray	Skippy Dies	Novel	UK	Hamish Hamilton
Rose Tremain	Trespass	Novel	UK	Chatto & Windus
Christos Tsiolkas	The Slap	Novel	Australia	Allen & Unwin
Alan Warner	The Stars in the Bright Sky	Novel	Scotland	Jonathan Cape
