= Shipstead =

Shipstead is a surname. Notable people with the surname include:

- Henrik Shipstead (1881–1960), American politician
- Maggie Shipstead (born 1983), American author
