= Leo Noe =

British real estate investor

Leo Noé
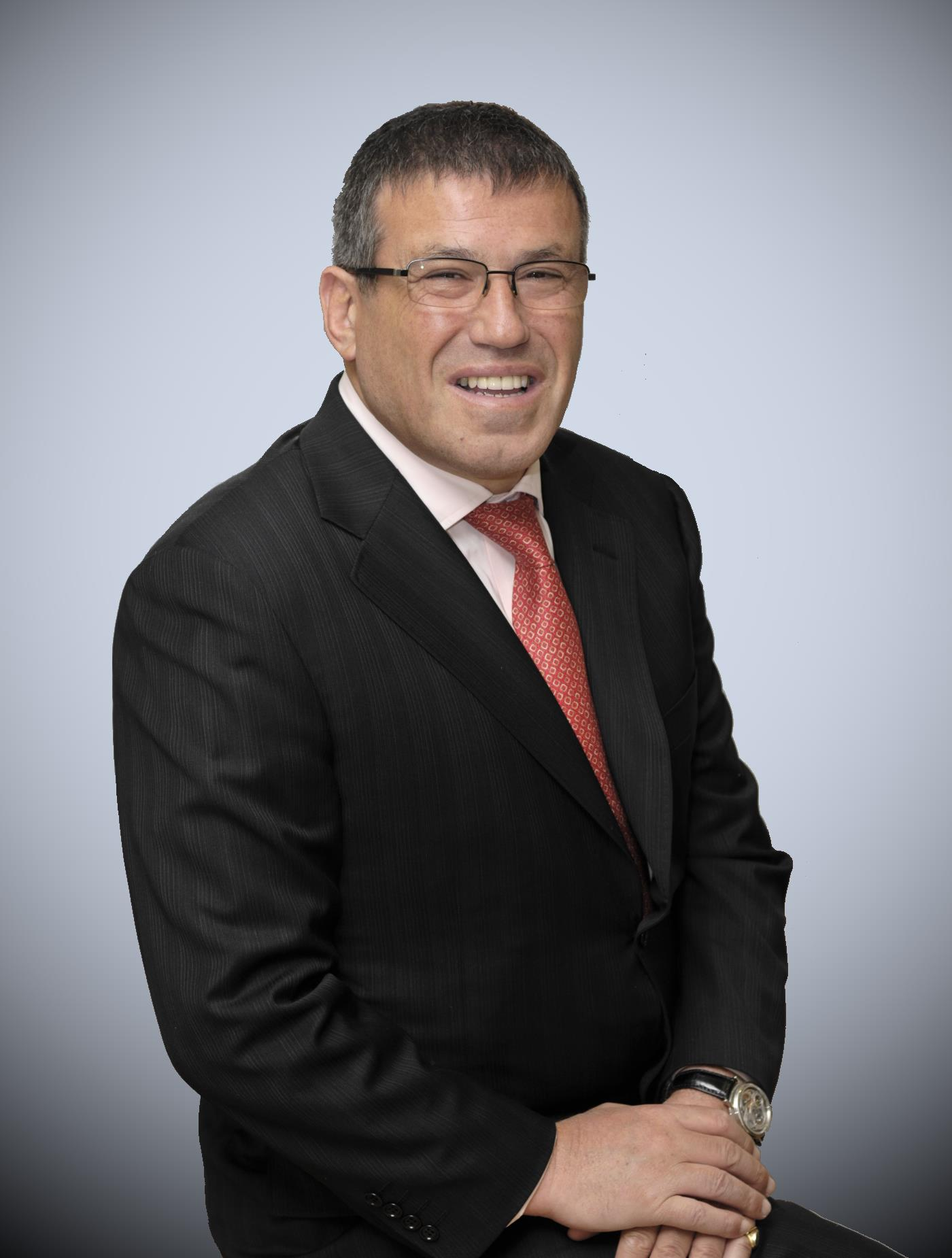
- Leo Noé
- Born: August 1953 (age 73)
- Occupations: Businessman; Philanthropist
- Known for: Property Investments; Ex-owner of Jewish News
- Political party: Conservative
- Children: 5

Leopold Noé (born August 1953) is a British property investor. His net worth is at least £606 million based on the 2021 and 2020 Sunday Times Rich List.

The Sunday Times Giving List, published in May 2021, reports Noé appears in the top 30 of all-time givers between 2002 and 2021, with over £100m of charitable donations over that time.

== Early life ==
Leopold Noé was born in August 1953. He is the son of fellow property developer Salomon Noé (sometimes Solomon Noé, born December 1930). Both of Noé's parents were in Auschwitz concentration camp before being liberated in 1944 and making their way to London.

== Career ==
Noé is executive chairman and founder of the Noé Group and latterly non-executive chairman of BMO Real Estate Partners. The Noé Group announced its first deal in December 2017, the sale of the Debenhams department store building in Manchester, for £87m. Also in December 2017, the Noé Group's real estate business, Capreon, acquired De Haagsche Zwaan (The Swan) office block in The Hague from Union Investment.

He joined the BMO REP board on completion of the F&C/REIT merger in September 2008, having previously been founder and chairman of REIT Asset Management where he was responsible for overall strategy and client liaison.

In March 2017, Noé and Ivor Smith sold their aggregate 30% interest in BMO REP to F&C Asset Management plc (part of BMO Global Asset Management and an existing 70% Partner). With effect from August 2017, the UK Value Add assets that include contracts for the management of Noé family trust assets will return to Noé and his family. The Noé family trust assets in Germany will remain under the management of BMO REP in Munich.

Noé established Lee Baron Commercial Limited, a firm of property consultants with a wide range of clients, where he still holds the position of non-executive director, and was chief executive of Bourne End Properties PLC between 1989 and 1997, a listed property investment company where his family trusts were the main shareholders.

Noé's British-Israel company, F&C REIT, is now the largest owner of shopping malls in Israel with a €1.5bn (£1.2bn) portfolio. REIT Israel Group (formerly Azorim Properties) owns a $20 million 11,000 square-meter shopping center at the entrance to Nahariya. Noé was the lead buyer in an attempted takeover of Shufersal, buying Nochi Dankner's majority stake in the business. The merging of Reit's £3.45bn portfolio with F&C's £5.2bn property arm has diversified Noé's business away from family trusts and private cash to more institutional sources of equity. His companies operate in India, South America and Africa, and Europe.

In February 2018, Noé received a lifetime achievement award from UK Israel Business at its annual awards ceremony.

He is the former owner of Jewish News.

== Personal life ==
Noé lives in London. His sons Zvi and Raphael work for Capreon, a property group owned by the Noé Group. His daughter Shevi is married to David Bloom, who runs Goldacre Ventures, a private equity group, which is now part of the Noé Group.

== Philanthropic work ==
Primarily through the Rachel Charitable Trust, Noé is a philanthropist and benefactor to various charities in the UK and Israel and a trustee and patron to a number of education and welfare institutions. Noé was a member of the UK government's Holocaust Commission and a member of the Jewish Leadership Council's Commission on Jewish Schools and chairman of its Schools Strategy Implementation Group (SSIG). He is an active participant in education strategy and planning projects, with a particular and keen interest in Special Needs Education in both the UK and Israel. Noé was instrumental in securing SEN as a specialism under the schools funding programme and has committed his time and energy to SEN within the Jewish Community and to over 50 SEN schools outside of the Jewish Community.

While the Rachel Charitable Trust lists some beneficiaries in its accounts, it charges £25 for a full list of the organisations it supports, an unorthodox arrangement among UK foundations.

In 1998, Noé became a trustee of Kisharon, a London-based charity founded in 1976 which provides innovative support to children with complex learning disabilities, their families, teachers and other professionals. In June 2021, Noé stood down from this position following the opening of the Wohl Campus, Kisharon Noé School in Hendon.

Noé established the Kemach Foundation in 2007, based on the belief that for the Haredi community to become part of Israeli economic society and for Israeli society to accept the Haredi community, they have to integrate into the workforce. It has become the premier agency for higher education and employment for the Haredi community throughout Israel, supporting 29,000 Haredi men and women as of January 2018.

Noé's philanthropic approach is based on education, training and collaboration, aiming to create employment opportunities, encourage tolerance and build sustainable communities. Noé was a speaker at the Accelerate Conference in New York in December 2015. His speech is here. In January 2016, Noé was reappointed vice-president and Treasurer of the Jewish Leadership Council (JLC) In April 2017, he was named at number 64 on the Sunday Times Giving list ranking the top 100 charitable contributors in the UK, having donated around £7.8m during the previous year, details here

- As Treasurer of Jewish Leadership Council, oversaw 8-fold increase in individual donations in 2016 compared to 2015.
- Rachel Charitable Trust, benefactor to various charities within the UK and Israel.
- Special Educational Needs (SEN) in both the UK and Israel.
- Pledged £750,000 in 2005 to special-needs education in the UK.
- Kemach Foundation: "...to help Haredi students sustain themselves in dignity. Behind Kemach stands philanthropist Leo Noé, owner of British company Reit Asset Management."

== Political activity ==
Noé is a Conservative Party donor. He donated £130,000 to the party in the first quarter of 2017. During the 2019 general election, he made donations of £125,000 and £25,000 to the party and donated £2,500 to Finchley and Golders Green MP Mike Freer.
