= A Sinless Season =

1982 novel by Damon Galgut

- First edition (South Africa)
- Author: Damon Galgut
- Publisher: Jonathan Ball (South Africa); Constable (UK)
- Publication date: 1982
- Publication place: South Africa
- ISBN: 9780140070774

A Sinless Season is a novel by South African author Damon Galgut. It was published in 1982, when the author was only seventeen. It details the interactions between Scott, Raoul, and Joseph, three young inmates at the Bleda reformatory.
