= A Passage North =

2021 novel by Anuk Arudpragasam

- First edition cover, (Hogarth, 2021)
- Author: Anuk Arudpragasam
- Language: English
- Set in: Sri Lanka
- Publisher: Hogarth Press
- Publication date: 13 July 2021
- Publication place: Sri Lanka
- Media type: Print (hardback), e-book, audio
- Pages: 304
- ISBN: 978-0-593-23070-1
- OCLC: 1198990030
- Dewey Decimal: 823/.92
- LC Class: PR9440.9.A78 P37 2021

A Passage North is a 2021 novel written by Anuk Arudpragasam. The novel is set in Sri Lanka following the end of the Civil War. It was first published on 13 July 2021 by Hogarth Press in the United States and by Hamish Hamilton in India. It was also published by Granta Books in the United Kingdom on 15 July 2021. It was shortlisted for the 2021 Booker Prize.

The novel follows Krishan, a young man working for a non-government organisation (NGO) in contemporary Colombo who makes a journey to the north of Sri Lanka – the former civil war battleground, to attend the cremation of his grandmother's former caretaker, Rani.

== Writing ==
A philosophical novel, A Passage North is intensely introspective. The narrative primarily comprises long and flowing sentences filled with participial phrases and subordinate clauses. Dialogue is described in the past perfect tense with no direct quotation marks. The author rationalised this choice as not wanting to "engage in ventriloquism". The prose style favours long paragraphs and chapter breaks don't bring about much change or momentum. Sweeping comments are made with regard to human philosophy. Compared to the author's previous novel The Story of a Brief Marriage, the story is more distant from the conflict and more abstract. The author, who has a doctorate in philosophy, poses existential questions on living and laments on the gulf between people who have lived through the suffering caused by the civil conflict (like Rani) and those who were safe and away from the conflict (like Krishan).

Anuk Arudpragasam has said in interviews that he wanted the emotional core of the novel to be the relationship between Krishan and his grandmother. However, the grandmother–grandson story ends up being merely contextual. Krishan is pre-occupied and his thoughts go back and forth between Rani's depression, caused by the loss of her two sons, and his past relationship with Anjum.

The narrative includes elaborate digressions on famous works – that reviewers have characterised as Proustian – on Kalidasa's epic Sanskrit poem The Cloud Messenger, on the tale of a poor Shiva devotee who builds a grand temple for his lord within his mind from the Tamil Periya Puranam, and on the documentary film My Daughter the Terrorist.

The novel is also political – it condemns the atrocities committed by the Sri Lankan government on Tamil civilians.

== Characters ==
- Krishan – the protagonist. A Sri Lankan Tamil who works for an NGO and lives with his mother and grandmother in Colombo.
- Appamma – Krishan's grandmother.
- Krishan's mother
- Anjum – Krishan's former girlfriend who is an Indian activist.
- Rani – Appamma's caretaker. Her two sons had died in the Civil war, which led her to being mentally disturbed.

== Reception ==
Reviewing for The Hindu, Prathyush Parasuraman complimented the literary brilliance of the novel, and wrote that the frequent uses of clichés were acceptable and believable. The New York Times noted the writer's stylistic resemblance with W. G. Sebald and Primo Levi. Lucy Popescu of The Observer described the book as "another profound meditation on suffering but, this time, Arudpragasam's Tamil narrator is at a distance, struggling with survivor's guilt and war's aftermath."

The Guardian writer Marcel Theroux wrote a more critical review, describing the protagonist as being "frustratingly passive" whose musings and reminiscences comprise the bulk of the book. He concluded that memorable fiction required a "form of wondering" that is deeper and less abstract than what the novel provides. He stated that the book centers on the thought of the unremarkable protagonist, while the more powerful female characters are only glimpsed at.

The novel was shortlisted for the 2021 Booker Prize, and was included on the "Big Jubilee Read" list of 70 books selected by a panel of experts, and announced by the BBC and The Reading Agency in April 2022, to celebrate the Platinum Jubilee of Elizabeth II in June 2022.
