= Tzelem (disambiguation) =

Tzelem is a rabbinic social justice movement in the UK.

Tzelem may also refer to:

- Tzelem (town), Yiddish name for town of Deutschkreutz in Austria
- Tzelem elohim, a Hebrew transliteration of "Image of God"
