= The Orchard of Lost Souls =

2013 novel by Nadifa Mohamed

- First edition
- Author: Nadifa Mohamed
- Language: English
- Genre: Historical novel
- Publisher: Simon & Schuster
- Publication date: September 2013
- Publication place: United Kingdom
- Media type: Print (hardback)
- Pages: 352 pp (1st hardcover edition)
- ISBN: 9781471115295
- Preceded by: Black Mamba Boy
- Followed by: The Fortune Men

The Orchard of Lost Souls is a 2013 novel by the Somali-British author Nadifa Mohamed. It is set in Somalia on the eve of the civil war. Her second book, coming four years after her award-winning debut work Black Mamba Boy (2009), it was published by Simon & Schuster.

== Reception ==
Reviewing The Orchard of Lost Souls in The Independent, Arifa Akbar said: "If Mohamed's first novel was about fathers and sons ... this one is essentially about mothers and daughters." Aminatta Forna wrote in The New York Times: "In both 'Black Mamba Boy' and 'The Orchard of Lost Souls,' Nadifa Mohamed — generationally at a remove from the events she describes — shows how the echo of war reverberates down the generations, and why every nation needs its storytellers: someone to, if not make sense of events, then order them so that sense may be drawn." The Lady summarized the novel by saying: "Exquisitely written, it weaves together unflinching descriptions of violent acts and moments of luminous beauty. Mohamed’s characters are flawed and fascinating, capable of great cruelty and kindness. She exposes the vulnerability of women in a maledominated society, but also celebrates their awe-inspiring strength, and their redemptive power to build where men destroy." In Anita Sethi's review in The Observer concluded: "This novel shows its author blossoming into her talent with her own innovative, at times pulse-quickening style, distilling startling language from loss."

== Awards ==
In 2014, The Orchard of Lost Souls won the Somerset Maugham Award and was longlisted for the Dylan Thomas Prize.
