= Sylvaine Strike =

South African actress, writer and theatre director

- Born: Pretoria, South Africa
- Education: University of Cape Town
- Occupations: Actress; Writer; Theater director
- Awards: Chevalier des Arts et des Lettres (2019)

Sylvaine Strike is a South African actress, writer and theatre director based in Cape Town, South Africa. She is the co-founder of Fortune Cookie Theatre, and has won multiple Naledi Theatre awards for her acting and directing. In 2018 Strike was awarded the Chevalier des Arts et des Lettres.

== Early life ==
Strike was born in Pretoria to French-speaking parents, and grew up in Verwoerdburg. She studied at the University of Cape Town and graduated with a degree in drama in 1993. Strike studied further from 1998 to 2000 in Paris at Jacques LeCoq School where she completed a two-year diploma with a focus in mime and clown.

== Career ==
=== Theatre ===
Strike is the artistic director of Fortune Cookie Theatre, which she co-founded in 2000. With Fortune Cookie Theatre, Strike has directed such shows as Molière's The Miser (2012) and Tartuffe (2017) and the Chekhov-adaptation, Tobacco and the Harmful Effects Thereof (2016). In 2004, Strike co-created the show Black and Blue with other members of Fortune Cookie, which she also starred in. In 2015, Fortune Cookie remounted the production.

Outside of Fortune Cookie Theatre, Strike has directed shows such as Miss Dietrich Regrets (2015), DOP (2019), and ECLIPSED (2019). Strike also assisted in adapting the story of Snow White into Snow White - The Ballet for Joburg Ballet in 2017. In 2023 she worked with Damon Galgut to adapt his novel, The Promise into a stage production. In 2024, Strike directed her first musical, Spring Awakening, an adaptation of the 1891 German play Frühlings Erwachen, by Frank Wedekind.

=== Film and television ===
Strike has appeared in such films as District 9 (2009) and Jock the Hero Dog (2011). Strike has had roles on television shows like Those Who Can't, Black Sails, Mad Dogs, and The Hot Zone.

== Awards ==
Strike was awarded the Rosalie van den Gucht Best New Director in 2004. In 2006, Strike was awarded the Standard Bank Young Artist Award for Drama. In 2010, she was one of twenty-five nominees for the Rolex Mentor Protégé Arts Initiative.

Strike won the Fleur du Cap Best Director Theatre Award for her acclaimed production of Samuel Beckett's Endgame for the Baxter Theatre Centre, Cape Town. Endgame was also awarded Best Production and Best Actor.

As a performer Strike has won the Naledi Best Actress Award 2004 and 2006 for her roles in Black and Blue and Coupé. She has further been nominated in the Best Director category at the Naledi, Fleur du Cap and Woordfees Awards 2016 for her direction of the critically acclaimed plays Tobacco and Dop. The Miser won her the Naledi Best Director Award 2012 and Best Production of a Play 2012. Strike'sTartuffe in 2018 was awarded best supporting actress for Khutjo Green, best ensemble award and best costume design in the Naledi awards.

In 2011, Strike's production of Butcher Brothers was awarded the Naledi Award for Best-Cutting Edge Production. In 2014, Strike was recognized as the Featured Artist at the National Arts Festival in South Africa. As featured artist, Strike worked with the arts festival committee to create a retrospective of her work. Strike was awarded a 2017 SAFTA in the category Best Supporting Actress - TV Comedy for her work on the show Those Who Can't. Strike was nominated for a Kanna Award for her direction of DOP in 2017.

Strike was awarded the Chevalier des Arts et des Lettres in 2018 for her contribution to the performing arts.
