= The Story of a Brief Marriage =

2016 debut novel by Anuk Arudpragasam

- First edition cover
- Author: Anuk Arudpragasam
- Language: English
- Publisher: Flatiron Books
- Publication date: September 6, 2016
- Publication place: New York
- Media type: Print (hardback)
- Pages: 193
- ISBN: 978-1-250-07240-5
- OCLC: 932576767
- Dewey Decimal: 823/.92
- LC Class: PR9440.9.A78 S86 2016

The Story of a Brief Marriage is the debut novel by Anuk Arudpragasam that was published on September 6, 2016, by Flatiron Books.

== Synopsis ==
The novel, written between 2011 and 2014, describes a day and a night in the lives of two young Tamils, Dinesh and Ganga, who are forced into a marriage as the Sri Lankan army intensifies its bombardment of the camp on the north-eastern coast where they are taking refuge. "I grew up in the south of Sri Lanka in a well-off family, as insulated as someone could be from the war," Arudpragasam told Guernica magazine. "It was an attempt to cross certain kinds of differences in experience between myself and these many other people in the north of the country who I had become separated from."

== Reception ==
Randy Boyagoda of The Guardian wrote: "A debut novel which raises timely questions about how we regard the suffering of others." Bárbara Mujica of Washington Independent Review of Books wrote "Still, The Story of a Brief Marriage is a worthwhile read. It turns our focus not only on the brutality of war, but also on the blessing of life." Novelist Colm Toibin praised Arudpragasam's dense and attentive style: "Every image in the book, including the most desolate, is rendered with precision and an aura of pure truth and tenderness." Neera Majumdar of ThePrint wrote: "The Story of a Brief Marriage is delicate, unsparing, and depicts the Sri Lankan civil war through the lens of the mortal human body." Arifa Akbar of the Financial Times wrote: "A remarkable debut novel about a young Sri Lankan couple at a time of bloody civil war."

The book was listed as one of the best novels of 2016 by The Wall Street Journal, NPR, and the Financial Times.

The book has been also reviewed by Ru Freeman of The New York Times, Rohini Mohan of The Hindu, Nilakantan R.S. of The Indian Wire, Sarah Gilmartin of The Irish Times, Supriya Nair of Mint and Elizabeth Stark of The Rumpus.

== Awards and nominations ==
- Shakti Bhatt Prize
- DSC Prize for South Asian Literature
- Shortlisted for Dylan Thomas Prize
