= Second Place (novel) =

2021 novel by Rachel Cusk

- First edition cover (Farrar, Straus & Giroux, 2021)
- Author: Rachel Cusk
- Audio read by: Kate Fleetwood
- Language: English
- Publisher: Farrar, Straus & Giroux (US); Faber and Faber (UK)
- Publication date: 4 May 2021 (US); 6 May 2021 (UK)
- Publication place: United Kingdom
- Media type: Print (hardback), e-book, audio
- Pages: 192 (US); 224 (UK)
- ISBN: 978-0-374-90778-5 (US first edition hardback); 978-0-571-36629-3 (UK first edition hardback)
- OCLC: 1182584680
- Dewey Decimal: 823/.914
- LC Class: PR6053.U825 S43 2021

Second Place is a 2021 novel by Rachel Cusk.

== Premise ==
A female narrator, M, invites a famous painter, L, to use her guesthouse on the English coast marshlands where she lives with her family. It is inspired by Mabel Dodge Luhan's 1932 memoir Lorenzo in Taos, about the writer D. H. Lawrence's early 1920s sojourn in Taos, New Mexico.

== Reception ==
In its starred review, Kirkus Reviews wrote that Cusk's "brilliant prose and piercing insights convey a dark but compelling view of human nature." Publishers Weekly, in its starred review, wrote, "There is the erudition of the author's Outline trilogy here, but with a tightly contained dramatic narrative."

The novel was longlisted for the 2021 Booker Prize, a finalist for the National Book Critics Circle Award for Fiction, and shortlisted for the Governor General's Award for English-language fiction at the 2021 Governor General's Awards. Blandine Longre's French translation was awarded the 2022 Prix Femina étranger.
