= The Fortune Men =

2021 novel by Nadifa Mohamed

- First edition cover
- Author: Nadifa Mohamed
- Audio read by: Hugh Quarshie
- Language: English
- Genre: Non-fiction novel
- Set in: Butetown, Cardiff in 1952
- Publisher: Viking
- Publication date: 27 May 2021
- Publication place: United Kingdom
- Media type: Print (hardcover), e-book, audio
- Pages: 384
- Awards: Wales Book of the Year
- ISBN: 9780241466940
- OCLC: 1199330473
- Dewey Decimal: 823/.92
- LC Class: PR6113.O364
- Preceded by: The Orchard of Lost Souls

The Fortune Men is a 2021 novel by the Somali-British author Nadifa Mohamed, published on 27 May 2021, by the Viking Books imprint of Penguin General.

The novel was shortlisted for the 2021 Booker Prize, and won the 2022 Wales Book of the Year.

== Synopsis ==
The Fortune Men is a non-fiction novel that semi-fictionalises the true story of Mahmood Hussein Mattan, a Somali former merchant seaman who was executed after being wrongfully convicted of the 6 March 1952 murder of Lily Volpert (renamed Violet Volacki in the book) in Cardiff's Tiger Bay. Mattan was posthumously acquitted in 1998 when it was revealed that evidence had been falsified and manipulated by the police. He was the last person to be hanged at HM Prison Cardiff. Mohamed's father, who was also born in Somaliland, met Mattan when the two emigrated to Kingston upon Hull.

== Reception ==
In The Guardian, Ashish Ghadiali wrote of Mohamed that the novel "confirms her as a literary star of her generation." Michael Donkor, in his review for The Guardian, praised Mohamed for "humanising" Mattan and expressing his religious faith "in delicate and perspicacious prose." Catherine Taylor of the Financial Times wrote, "The Fortune Men is a novel on fire, a restitution of justice in prose."

The Fortune Men was shortlisted for the 2021 Booker Prize. At the 2022 Wales Book of the Year Awards, the novel won the 'triple crown': taking the Rhys Davies Trust Fiction Award, the Wales Arts Review People's Choice Award and the overall prize for Wales Book of the Year.
