= Jewish News =

Tabloid Jewish newspaper in the United Kingdom

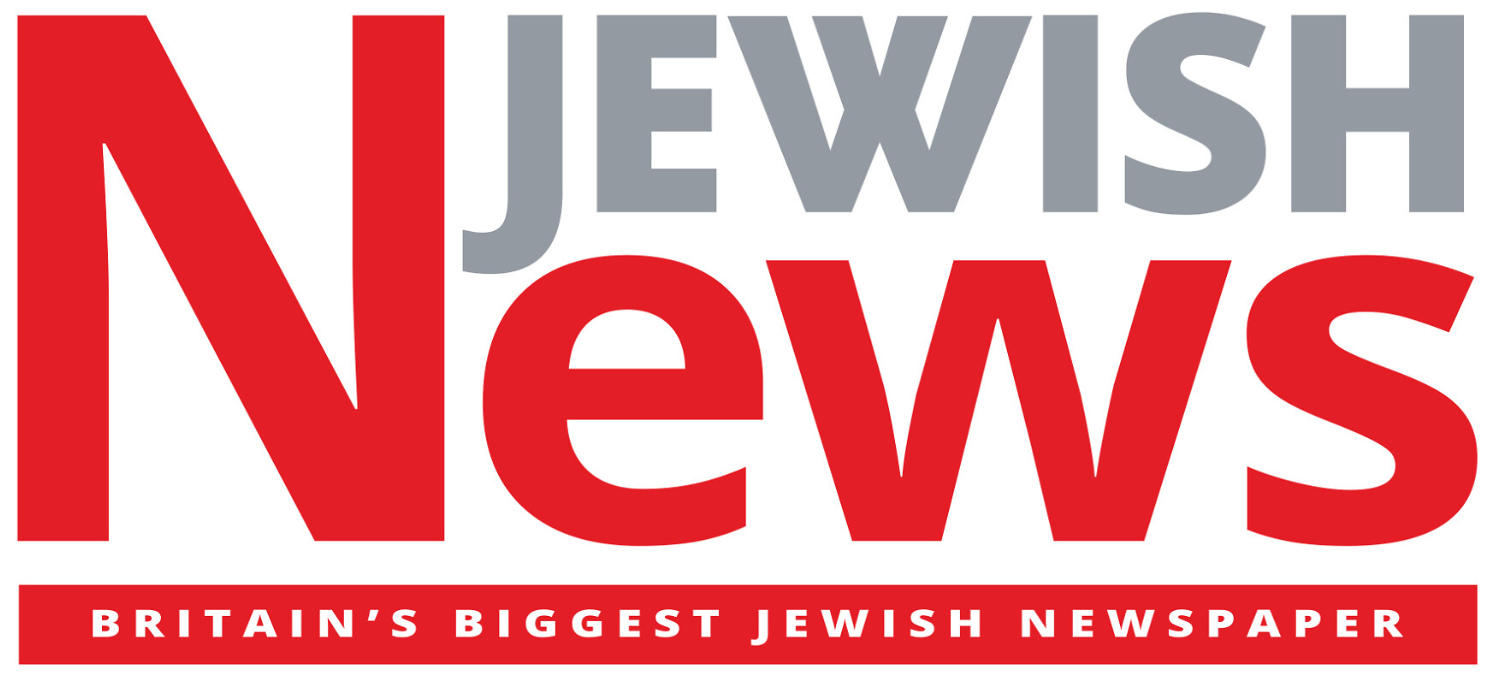

- July 30, 2026 issue of Jewish News
- Type: Weekly newspaper
- Format: Tabloid
- Owner: Independent Jewish Community News Foundation
- Founder(s): Gary Stern, Michael Sinclair
- Editor: Richard Ferrer
- Founded: 1997
- Country: United Kingdom
- Website: www.jewishnews.co.uk

The Jewish News is a free weekly newspaper, established in 1997, that serves the Jewish communities of Greater London – specifically, Middlesex, Hertfordshire and Essex.

In February 2020, it announced plans to merge with The Jewish Chronicle. In April 2020, it announced that it would enter voluntary liquidation, alongside The Jewish Chronicle, preparatory to a combined rescue plan, but following a bid emerging for The Jewish Chronicle, announced that it would continue as an independent publication. In Autumn 2020, the newspaper's ownership was transferred to the Independent Jewish Community News Foundation.

== History ==
Jewish News was founded in 1997 and serves the Jewish communities of Greater London. It claims to be the largest Jewish newspaper in the United Kingdom.

The Jewish News is published in tabloid format and distributed free of charge. Published every Thursday, the paper provides a weekly mix of local, national and international Jewish news, opinions, features, sport and entertainment.

With a weekly distribution of 24,518 copies as audited by ABC for the period July to December 2016, the paper is the largest Jewish Newspaper in the UK by distribution. It is available at more than 230 points across the capital including synagogues, shops, schools, community centres and street stands, and as of 2019 it had reached its 1,100th edition. It is currently under the editorship of former Daily Mail journalist and The Jewish Advocate editor Richard Ferrer.

In 2002, Jewish News won the Press Gazette Free Newspaper of the Year award. In June 2015, Jewish News co-organised a UK-Israel Shared Strategic Challenges Conference. Speakers at the day-long event in Parliament included then Israeli deputy prime minister Silvan Shalom, Opposition Leader Isaac Herzog, Yesh Atid leader Yair Lapid as well as UK Middle East Minister Tobias Ellwood and Charles Farr, the Home Office's counter terrorism chief.

In February 2018, Jewish News lost a libel case brought by Baroness Warsi over allegations that she has sought to excuse the actions of Islamic State terrorists. The article, written by Richard Kemp, also claimed she had objected to action being taken against British Muslims who murder and rape for the group, which Warsi said was "untrue and offensive". Jewish News accepted that the article was false: it apologised and was ordered to pay damages of £20,000 and legal costs.

== Ownership ==
In February 2020, the Jewish News, owned by property investor Leo Noe, and Jewish Chronicle, owned by the Kessler Foundation, announced plans to merge, subject to raising the necessary finance to support the merger. Combined, they print more than 40,000 copies weekly. In April 2020, The Jewish Chronicle and Jewish News announced simultaneously a creditors voluntary liquidation, citing the impact of COVID-19. The owners of The Jewish Chronicle then submitted a bid to the liquidators for its assets, intending to combine them with the Jewish News under the latter's editor. However, following the emergence of a rival bid for The Jewish Chronicle, The Jewish News announced that it had sufficient funds to operate as a going concern and would continue to be published.

In November 2020, it was announced that the newspaper was donated to the Independent Jewish Community News Foundation, the rebranding of an existing charity. The announcement said that the move "will see a seamless continuation of the editorial direction under the leadership of editor Richard Ferrer and news editor Justin Cohen, who also serve as co-publishers." According to the paper's website, since this time it was owned by the Jacob Foundation, formerly the Kessler Foundation. The Foundation's 2020 report described the Foundation's sale of the Chronicle, dispersal of funds to Jewish charities, and taking ownership of Jewish News:

The Foundation supported this ambition as a means to ensure that the British Jewish community could continue to rely on the Jewish News to provide high quality news and information for the Community, reflective of the broad range of views across that community, with balance as well as complete transparency and freedom from individual influence. Financial commitments from around a dozen donors from across the community who shared that vision, including the previous owners of the Jewish News, were obtained and agreements for the transfer of the newspaper and its associated website were completed in October 2020. At around the same time, the name of the Foundation was changed from The Kessler Foundation to The Jacob Foundation. This change signified the end of the near 40-year relationship between the Foundation, the Jewish Chronicle and the Kessler family.

== See also ==
- Hamodia
- The Jewish Chronicle
- Jewish Tribune (UK)
- The Times of Israel
