= Great Circle (novel) =

2021 novel by Maggie Shipstead

- First edition cover
- Author: Maggie Shipstead
- Language: English
- Publisher: Alfred A. Knopf
- Publication date: May 4, 2021
- Publication place: United States
- Media type: Print (hardcover), e-book, audio
- Pages: 608
- ISBN: 978-0-525-65697-5 (First edition hardcover)
- OCLC: 1154075263
- Dewey Decimal: 813/.6
- LC Class: PS3619.H586 G74 2021

Great Circle is a 2021 novel by American writer Maggie Shipstead, published on May 4, 2021, by Alfred A. Knopf.

The novel was shortlisted for the 2021 Booker Prize and the 2022 Women's Prize for Fiction.

== Synopsis ==
The novel consists of two parallel narratives about two fictional women. One is about the disappeared 20th-century aviator Marian Graves, while the other is about a 21st-century actress, Hadley Baxter, who is cast in the role of Marian for a film about her final flight. Hadley is shown struggling with the demands of being a Hollywood starlet while learning more about the life of Marian. Hadley's narrative is told in the first-person, while Marian's sections are told in the third-person.

== Structure ==
Each of the narrative threads is arranged largely in chronological order and interleaved with the other thread at irregular intervals. At the outset two short sections act as prefaces, introducing the context of the two narratives. The first is the final entry of aviator Marian Graves's logbook, recorded just before the final leg of her around-the-world flight in 1950. The second preface is dated December 2014, depicting the last day of the shooting of a film about Marian Graves's flight around-the-world.

In the first thread, which follows events pertaining to the Graves family between 1909 and 1950, each section heading contains a date and a location. This part of the novel is related in 52 sections. In the second thread the chapters are numbered ("One" to "Twenty-Two") and cover events in 2014 in the life of the first-person narrator, Hadley Baxter, as well as flashbacks that describe her life up to that point.

== Characters ==
=== 1909—1950 ===
Name	Description
Marian Graves	(September 6, 1914 – 1950 (missing/assumed dead)), twin sister of Jamie, adventurous, curious, autodidact, aviator
Jamie Graves	(September 6, 1914 - 1943), gentle sensitive boy, vegetarian from childhood on; autodidact; talented portrait painter, enlisted as painter-journalist in WW2
Addison Graves	father of Marian and Jamie; Capitan of Josephine Eterna; imprisoned in Sing Sing prison 1915-1924 on charges of cowardice (for abandoning ship while saving his three-month-old twin infants in December 1914)
Annabel Graves	passenger on Josephina Eterna in January 1914; sexually abused by father at age seven (p 24-25); mother committed suicide; mother of Marian and Jamie; presumably drowned when Josephine Eterna sank in December 1914
Lloyd Feiffer	son of German immigrant; graduate of Yale, inherited L&O Lines from father in 1906, philanderer; owner of the Josephine Eterna; smuggler of war materials on his ships in WW1; profiteer from war-time shipping contracts; died in 1945
Mathilda Feiffer	Lloyd's wife, runs business after husband dies young; pays for Marian's round-the-world flight in atonement for her husband's treatment of Addison Graves; publishes "The Sea, the Sky, the Birds Between: The Lost Logbook of Marian Graves" in 1959, after it is discovered at "Little America III" on Ross Ice Shelf, Antarctica
Feiffer sons	Henry; Clifford; Robert; Leander (died 1914); George (born 1915)
Chester Fine	lawyer for Lloyd Feiffer; only visitor of Addison Graves during prison stay
Wallace Graves	artist; 10-year younger brother of Addison, who paid for Wallace to go to art school; gambler and alcoholic; legal guardian of Marian and Jamie in Missoula, Montana
Berit	Norwegian housekeeper for Wallace Graves in Missoula, Montana
Caleb Bitterroot	childhood neighbor and life-long friend of Marian and Jamie (p. 76); acts as intermediary between Marian and Jamie when they are separated; Marian's first sexual encounter; visits Marian in England as a soldier in WW2; finds contentment in Hawaii as a ranch-hand
Gilda	Caleb's mother, an indigenous woman, a prostitute, who disappears for a long time from Caleb's life
Mr. Stanley	local baker and bootlegger in Missoula, for whom Marian begins making deliveries at age 14
Miss Dolly	runs a bordello in Missoula (girls: Belle, Cora, Desirée; cook Mrs. Wu)
Barclay Macqueen	bootlegger; son of a Scottish immigrant and a Flathead Salish mother; inherited Bannockburn, a large cattle ranch in Montana; meets Marian at age 14 for the first time at Miss Dolly's; pays for her flying lessons; marries her in 1931, when she is 17; pays off Wallace's debts and for his care in a nursing home in Denver
Sadler	right-hand man or assistant to Barclay Macqueen at ranch; marries Kate Macqueen
Trout Marx	pilot hired by Barclay Macqueen to teach Marian to fly
Geraldine	runs a rooming house near Vancouver, rents to Marian and later to Jamie, who becomes her lover for a period
Sarah Fahey	daughter of wealthy family in Seattle; befriends Jamie in 1931; her father forces her to break off contact with Jamie
Mrs. Fahey	former suffragist, mother of five children, benefactor of Jamie and later of assistance to Marian
Mr. Fahey	owner of an industrial meat processing company and an amateur art collector with a valuable but unsystematic collection; gives Jamie a temporary job of inventorying the art collection in 1931; makes plans to establish the Fahey Art Museum; fires Jamie when he learns he is a vegetarian
Kate Macqueen	Barclay's sister, who helps manage the cattle ranch and resents Marian's presence there, helps her acquire birth control
Jane Smith	the alias Marian adopts in 1934 to escape from Barclay and live freely as a pilot in Alaska
Mr. Ayukawa	commissions a portrait of his daughter from Jamie while he is living in Vancouver in 1935: he assumes Jamie is responsible for his daughter's disappearance and has him beat up
Flavian	an art dealer, and acquaintance of the Fahey family; sells Jamie's paintings in commission in the late 1930s, including to Seattle Art Museum; organises an exhibition where Jamie is re-introduced to Sarah
Lewis Scott	doctor in Seattle, married to Sarah Fahey
Jacqueline Cochran	(born Bessie Lee Pittman), organises the Air Transport Auxiliary (ATA) to employ women pilots during WW2
Helen Richey	aviator, takes over leadership of ATA in Europe when Cochran returns to Washington, D.C.
Ruth Bloom	aviator with ATA who befriends Marian, later becomes her lover
Eddie	flight navigator in WW2, husband of Ruth Bloom in a marriage of convenience; prisoner-of-war in Germany; agrees to be navigator on Marian's around-the-world flight
Leo	a soldier Eddie meets in a German prisoner-of-war camp who dresses in drag; Eddie falls in love with him and later visits him, then a married father of two, in Raleigh
Sitting-in-the Water-Grizzly	(1790-1837), member of Kootenai tribe in Idaho; transgender; married a Mr. Boisvard, the servant of David Thompson, a travelling trader and map-maker; while travelling in disguise as a translator she is discovered to be a woman and takes on the name Sitting-in-the-Water Grizzly; later renames herself Gone-to-the-Spirits and marries a woman; Marian Graves uses the name on postcards as a code to communicate with Caleb

=== 2014 ===
Name	Description
Hadley Baxter	orphaned at age 2; raised by movie-director uncle; teenage sitcom star in "The Big-Time Life of Katie McGee", from age 11; leading role in "Archangel" movie series; in 2014 plays Marian Graves in film titled "Peregrine"
Mitch Baxter	filmmaker; Hadley's uncle and parental guardian, dies while Hadley is a teenager
Oliver Trappman	co-star in "Archangel" and ex-partner of Hadley
Gwendolyn	author of Archangel book series, on which four Hollywood films are based
Gavin du Pré	producer of the Archangel films, who demands sexual favours from female actors during interviews
Ted Lazarus	head of Sun God Entertainment studios, financial backer of film "Peregrine"
Siobhan	Hadley's Hollywood agent
Alexei Young	Oliver Trappman's agent and some-time lover of Hadley Baxter
Sir Hugo Woolsey	movie producer, neighbor and mentor/confidante of Hadley
Rudy	Hugo Woolsey's live-in boyfriend
M.G.	Hadley's driver and security guard
Bart Olofsson	director of "Peregrine"
Jones Cohen	famous singer, with whom Hadley has a one-night stand that causes a scandal, leading indirectly to her being fired from Archangel series, thus ready to take on role of Marian Graves
Carol Feiffer	daughter-in-law of Mathilde Feiffer and the author of "Wings of Peregrine: A Novel" (1959), the basis for the film "Peregrine"
Redwood Feiffer	son of Carol Feiffer, heir of extensive Feiffer fortune; grandson of Mathilda Feiffer; befriends Hadley
Leanne	childhood friend of Redwood Feiffer, still in an open relationship with him
Kyle and Travis Day (Day brothers)	screenwriters commissioned to write the script for the film "Peregrine"
Adelaide Scott	well-known, successful artist; daughter of Sarah Fahey Scott and Jamie Graves; as a child met Marian, who visited with Sarah in Seattle in late 1940s; gives Hadley advice at a dinner party "Knowing what you don't want is just as useful as knowing what you do. Maybe more." (p. 344); tells Hadley about her meeting with Caleb in Hawaii; owns letters written by Marian that reveal information that conflicts with Carol Feiffer's biography
Joey Kamaka	adopted son of Caleb Bitterroot, who worked as a cowboy on a ranch in Oahu after leaving army; Joey kept photos and letters from Caleb's earlier years; visited by Hadley while she was on film-set in Hawaii

== Background ==
Shipstead spent seven years writing Great Circle, starting in 2014. In addition to writing, she spent this time completing research on early aviation, especially female aviators, and traveling to many of the locations in the book. During the course of writing, Shipstead visited Antarctica twice and the Arctic five times. In an interview she mentioned the importance of visiting Antarctica, saying, "I don't think I could have grasped sort of the precarious feeling of it and the scale of it without having seen that." She also spent two months living in Missoula, Montana as research, including a trip over the valley in a 1927 Travel Air 6000.

The book and main character Marian Graves were inspired by Jean Batten, a female aviator from New Zealand. Shipstead got the idea for the book after seeing a statue of Batten at the Auckland Airport.

== Reception ==
The novel debuted at number fourteen on The New York Times Hardcover fiction best-seller list for the week ending May 8, 2021. Critics praised the novel for sustaining its length and for Shipstead's research and intricate novel structure for perfectly interweaving the parallel narratives, despite the time and circumstances separating them.

In its starred review, Publishers Weekly wrote, "Shipstead manages to portray both Marian's and Hadley's expanded sense of consciousness as they push the boundaries inscribed around them [...] This is a stunning feat." Kirkus Reviews, in its starred review, wrote that "Shipstead reveals breathtaking range and skill, expertly juggling a multigenerational historical epic and a scandal-soaked Hollywood satire." Kirkus also commented that "her research is as invisible as it should be, allowing a fully immersive experience." Stephanie Merritt, for The Observer, wrote, "This is a novel that invites the reader to immerse themselves in the sweep of history, the rich and detailed research, and part of the pleasure is being carried along by the narrative through all its digressions and backstories." Library Journal wrote that the novel "justifies its length, by its intricately designed plot and by giving its compelling cast of characters room to breathe." Ron Charles of The Washington Post called it a "culturally rich story that takes full advantage of its extended length to explore the changing landscape of the 20th century." However, Charles lamented that the "extraordinary realism of Marian's chapters can make the broad strokes of Hadley's sections feel light in comparison."

Great Circle was shortlisted for the 2021 Booker Prize, and was later shortlisted for the 2022 Women's Prize for Fiction. The novel was also longlisted for the 2022 Andrew Carnegie Medal for Excellence in Fiction.
