= Black Mamba Boy =

2010 novel by Nadifa Mohamed

- First edition
- Author: Nadifa Mohamed
- Language: English
- Genre: historical novel, roman a clef
- Publisher: HarperCollins
- Publication date: 2010
- Publication place: United Kingdom
- Media type: Print (hardback & paperback)
- Pages: 304 pp (1st hardcover edition)
- ISBN: 0-374-11419-6; ISBN 978-0-374-11419-0 (recent paperback edition)
- OCLC: 456171394
- Followed by: The Orchard of Lost Souls

Black Mamba Boy is a 2010 novel by the Somali-British author Nadifa Mohamed.

== Overview ==
Black Mamba Boy (2010), the debut novel of Nadifa Mohamed, is a semi-autobiographical account of her father's life in Yemen in the 1930s and 1940s, during the colonial period through a character called Jama. It also recounts his trek through Sudan, Egypt, Palestine and the Mediterranean, before eventually settling in the United Kingdom. Jama's journey starts from Aden, Yemen, in 1935, after the death of Ambaro, his mother, and ends in Port Talbot, Wales, in 1947.

The "Black Mamba" reference in its title is an allusion to the black mamba snake. According to the author:

When my grandmother was heavily pregnant with my father, she was following her family’s caravan and she got lost and separated from the others. She sat down to rest under an acacia tree and a black mamba snake crept upon her belly before slithering away, leaving her unharmed. She took this as a sign that the child she carried would always be protected, and that’s how the title of the book came about.

== Awards ==
The novel won the 2010 Betty Trask Award, and was short-listed for numerous awards, including the 2010 Guardian First Book Award, the 2010 Dylan Thomas Prize, and the 2010 John Llewellyn Rhys Prize. The book was also long-listed for the 2010 Orange Prize for Fiction.
