= The Good Doctor (novel) =

2004 book by Damon Galgut

- Author: Damon Galgut
- Language: English
- Publisher: Atlantic Books (UK); Grove Press (US)
- Publication date: 9 January 2004 (US)

The Good Doctor is the fifth novel of South African author Damon Galgut. It was published in the United Kingdom by Atlantic Books and by Grove Press in the United States on 9 January 2004. The Good Doctor focuses on one doctor's struggle with his conscience in a rural hospital in post-apartheid South Africa. It was shortlisted for the Man Booker Prize in 2003.
