= My Daughter the Terrorist =

- Genre: Documentary
- Directed by: Beate Arnestad
- Country of origin: Norway

Production
- Producer: Morten Daae
- Production location: Sri Lanka
- Running time: 60 Minutes

My Daughter the Terrorist is a 2007 documentary film about 24-year-olds Dharsika and Puhalchudar living and fighting side-by-side for seven years as part of the Liberation Tigers of Tamil Eelam (LTTE) elite force, the Black Tigers. The women describe their traumatic experiences at the hands of the Sri Lankan army, which led them to join the guerrilla group.

Dharsika's father died in the war and was left with her mother struggling to bring up her family in a war-torn society. Growing up in a Catholic family, she wanted to be a nun, but later joined the LTTE after the death of her father. Puhalchudar lost her home with her family and ended up in a displaced persons camp, describing the horrific conditions they faced at a young age. Dharsika's mother hopes to meet her daughter and Puhalchudar during the rebel group's Heroes Day Memorial, also known as Maaveerar Naal, only to place flowers on the grave of the unknown soldier.

The film was directed by Beate Arnestad, produced by Morten Daae that received the award for Best International Feature-length Documentary at the Message to Man International Film Festival in 2017. It was shown at the 11th United Nations Association Film Festival in 2008. It was also shown at international film festivals in the United States, Belgium, Canada, Italy, Ukraine, Poland, Bogotá, Norway and Taiwan.
