= History of the Jews in the Isle of Man =

The location of the Isle of Man (dark green).

The history of the Jews in the Isle of Man goes back to at least the early 19th century.

== Background ==
The Isle of Man (Manx: Mannin [ˈmanɪnʲ], also Ellan Vannin [ˈɛlʲan ˈvanɪnʲ]), sometimes referred to simply as Mann /mæn/, is a self-governing British Crown dependency in the Irish Sea between Great Britain and Ireland. The head of state, King Charles III, holds the title of Lord of Mann and is represented by a lieutenant governor. Defence is the responsibility of the United Kingdom.

== Jewish community ==
The small Jewish community, previously called the Isle of Man Hebrew Congregation, is now known as Manx Hebrew Congregation. The community, concentrated in the island's largest town, Douglas, has no synagogue or rabbi, but there is a Jewish cemetery.

Articles and advertisements in the English press about the Jews on the Isle of Man go back about a hundred years. A 2016 report in The Jewish Chronicle stated that there were about 200 Jews on the island but they were not religious and mostly intermarried.

== World War I and World War II ==
Jews were interned on the Isle of Man during both World Wars as 'enemy aliens'. During World War I it was German Jewish prisoners of war and in World War II it was Jewish refugees fleeing Germany and Austria.

=== World War I ===
In 1914 the British Government passed the Aliens Restriction Act. Citizens of Germany and the Austro-Hungarian Empire who were living in, or even only visiting the UK, were designated as possible "Enemy Aliens". Men of fighting age were interned for the whole duration of the war in special camps for civilian detainees. Camps were created at sites across the UK. As the war progressed, prisoners of war were also put into the camps in London, The Isle of Man and Lofthouse Park. Over 32,000 civilian men were interned for some or all of the war. The Jewish Chronicle has archive evidence of the role that local British Jewish communities took on in support of some of the interned.

=== World War II ===
During World War II, to escape the Holocaust some sources state that there were about 1,500 German-Jewish civilian internees, whose spiritual and material welfare was supervised by the British Chief Rabbi's "Religious Emergency Council". Other sources state that it is estimated that about 2,000 to 3,000 people, mostly Jews, were interned on the Isle of Man during World War II as 'enemy aliens', with frequent visits by Rabbi Dr. Solomon Schonfeld, who inspected internee camps on behalf of the Council. A writer for The Jewish Chronicle wrote in November 1940:

Today the island has what must be the fullest Jewish life in the world. In ordinary camps on a weekday there are more worshippers than in the Great Synagogue, London, on a Sabbath. Lectures were delivered on a variety of Jewish topics, and the community was served by two kosher boarding houses.

Women and children internees were mostly housed in the areas of Port Erin and Port St Mary.

Nazis and Jews from Germany initially shared internment facilities.

The BBC reported in 2016 on the background to this saga, that at the start of World War II there were around 80,000 people in Britain who were considered potential "enemy aliens". The British government was afraid of spies and those who might assist the Nazis. In that light, the Isle of Man was chosen to accommodate people at camps in the towns of Douglas (see Hutchinson Internment Camp), Ramsey (see Mooragh Internment Camp) and Peel. The BBC report goes on to state that "political prisoners were detained in high security camps, but most internees – including many Jewish refugees – were free to go shopping, swim in the sea and attend classes. A few months later a mixed camp [for married couples] was established in Rushen." Eventually the Jewish prisoners were released and some men given the option of joining the British armed forces. Reports of the time record that by August 1940, there were in total around 14,000 prisoners held on the Isle of Man, with thousands more transported to internment camps in Canada and Australia.

At the Hutchinson Internment Camp in Douglas, numbers fell from September 1940 when the internees who posed no threat to Britain began to be released. This was particularly marked in Hutchinson Camp, where there was an unusually high proportion of Jewish and anti-Nazi internees. The camp closed during March 1944, when its 228 inmates transferred to Peveril Internment Camp in Peel in order to clear Hutchinson Camp ready for use as a prisoner of war camp.

== Modern day ==
In 2001 the Jewish community on the Isle of Man instituted its own Holocaust Memorial Day that is commemorated annually on or around International Holocaust Remembrance Day.
