= Nadifa Mohamed =

Somali-British novelist (born 1981)

Nadifa Mohamed نظيفة محمد FRSL
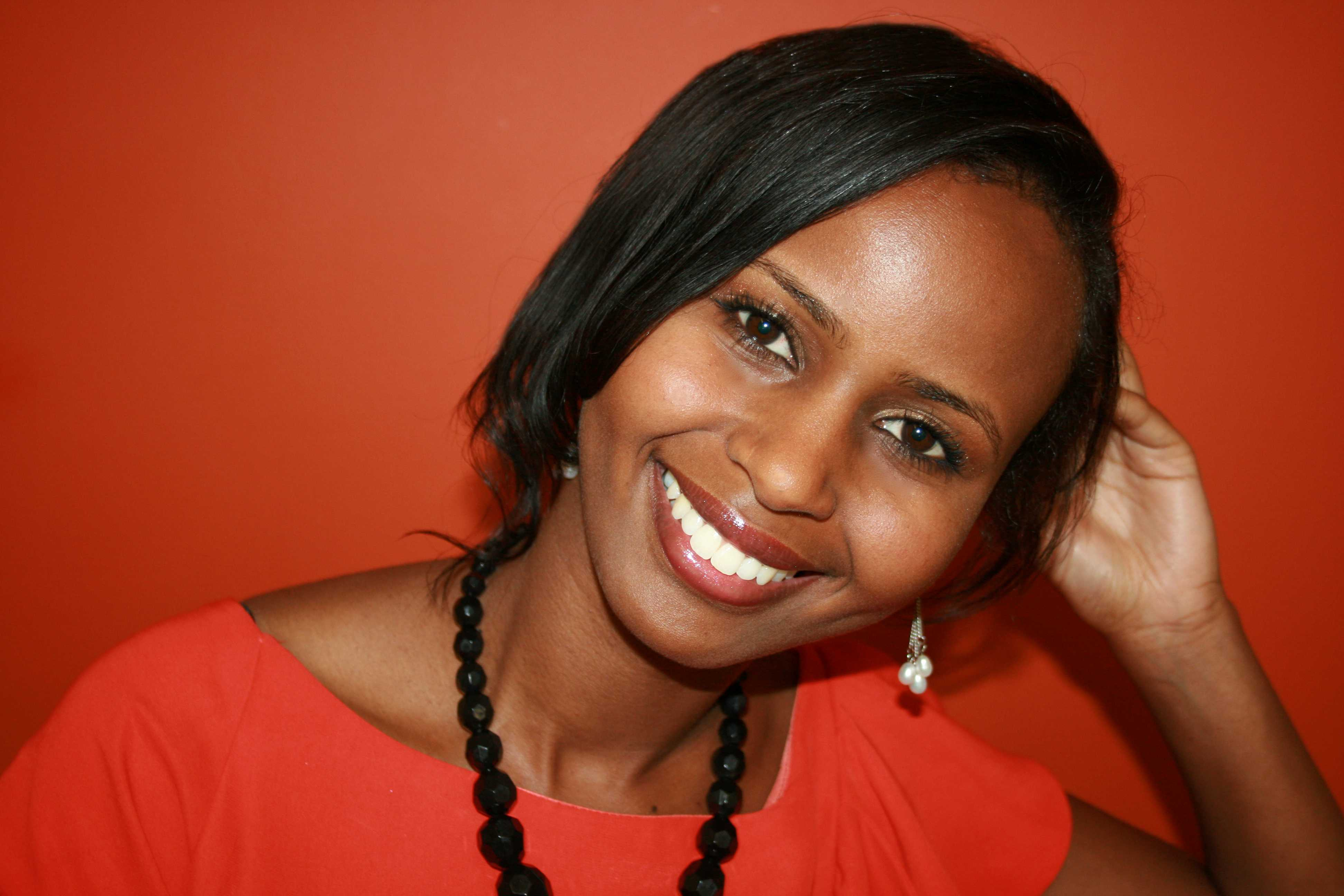
- Born: Nadiifa Maxamed; 1981 (age 44–45); Hargeisa, Somali Democratic Republic (now Somaliland)
- Education: St Hilda's College, Oxford
- Occupation: Novelist
- Notable work: Black Mamba Boy (2010); The Orchard of Lost Souls (2013); The Fortune Men (2021)
- Movement: Realism, historical fiction
- Awards: Betty Trask Award (2010); Somerset Maugham Award (2014); Prix Albert Bernard (2016); Wales Book of the Year (2022)

Nadifa Mohamed FRSL (Somali: Nadiifa Maxamed, Arabic: نظيفة محمد) (born 1981) is a Somali-British novelist. She featured on Granta magazine's list "Best of Young British Novelists" in 2013, and in 2014 on the Africa39 list of writers aged under 40 with potential and talent to define future trends in African literature. Her 2021 novel, The Fortune Men, was shortlisted for the 2021 Booker Prize, making her the first British Somali novelist to get this honour. She has also written short stories, essays, memoirs and articles in outlets including The Guardian, and contributed poetry to the anthology New Daughters of Africa (edited by Margaret Busby, 2019). Mohamed was also a lecturer in Creative Writing in the Department of English at Royal Holloway, University of London until 2021. She became Distinguished Writer in Residence at New York University in Spring 2022.

== Personal life ==
Mohamed was born in 1981 in Hargeisa, Somaliland. Her father was a sailor in the merchant navy. In 1986, she moved with her family to London for what was intended to be a temporary stay. However, the civil war broke out shortly afterwards in Somalia, so they remained in the UK.

Mohamed later attended St Hilda's College, Oxford, where she studied history and politics. In 2008, she visited Hargeisa for the first time in more than a decade.

Mohamed resides in London.

== Literary career ==
Mohamed's first novel, Black Mamba Boy (2010), described in The Guardian as "a significant, affecting book of the dispossessed", is a semi-biographical account of her father's life in Yemen in the 1930s and '40s, during the colonial period. She has said that "the novel grew out of a desire to learn more about my roots, to elucidate Somali history for a wider audience and to tell a story that I found fascinating." A "fictionalized biography", it won critical and popular acclaim in countries as far away as Korea. The book won the 2010 Betty Trask Award, and was shortlisted for numerous awards, including the 2010 Guardian First Book Award, the 2010 Dylan Thomas Prize, and the 2010 John Llewellyn Rhys Prize. It was also long-listed for the 2010 Orange Prize for Fiction.

In 2013, Mohamed released her second novel, The Orchard of Lost Souls. Set in Somalia on the eve of the civil war, the book was published by Simon & Schuster. Reviewing it in The Independent, Arifa Akbar said: "If Mohamed's first novel was about fathers and sons ... this one is essentially about mothers and daughters." In 2014, The Orchard of Lost Souls won the Somerset Maugham Award and was longlisted for the Dylan Thomas Prize.

In December 2013, Mohamed was one of 36 writer and translator participants at the Doha International Book Fair's Literary Translation Summit in Qatar.

She was chosen as one of Granta magazine's "Best of Young British Novelists" in 2013, and in April 2014 was selected for the Hay Festival's Africa39 list of 39 Sub-Saharan African writers aged under 40 with potential and talent to define future trends in African literature.

Her writing has also been published in such outlets as The Guardian and Literary Hub, as well as in the anthology New Daughters of Africa (edited by Margaret Busby, 2019), which includes poetry by Mohamed.

In June 2018, Mohamed was elected Fellow of the Royal Society of Literature in its "40 Under 40" initiative.

She joined the English Creative Writing faculty of Royal Holloway, University of London, in 2018.

Her 2021 novel, The Fortune Men, is based on the true story of Mahmood Mattan, whom her father knew. The book is about a petty criminal in Cardiff, Wales, who becomes the last man to be hanged there, wrongfully convicted of murder in 1952. In The Guardian, Ashish Ghadiali wrote of Mohamed that the novel "confirms her as a literary star of her generation", while Michael Donkor described the book as a "determined, nuanced and compassionate exposure of injustice". The Fortune Men was shortlisted for the 2021 Booker Prize, and at the 2022 Wales Book of the Year Awards won the "triple crown": taking the Rhys Davies Trust Fiction Award, the Wales Arts Review People's Choice Award and the overall prize for Wales Book of the Year.

Mohamed has said that her next book will be "a contemporary novel set in the world of Somali women in London".

== Television work ==
In 2023, Mohamed was commissioned by Channel 4 to present the historical documentary Britain’s Human Zoos, about Britain's fascination, dating from the late Victorian era, with objectifying Black and Brown people in "human zoos" for the purpose of entertainment. At the 2024 Edinburgh TV Festival, Mohamed won the Best Presenter (Factual) award.

Also for Channel 4, Mohamed presented the film Churchill: Britain's Secret Apartheid, aired on 19 October 2024. In The Guardian, Phil Harrison called it a "fascinating documentary about how the people of Britain reacted when US troops arrived during the second world war, bringing promises of freedom and, paradoxically, codified racism within their segregated army. Winston Churchill seemingly wrestled with this; cheeringly, most Brits ignored it."

In December 2025, Mohamed joined the four-episode docudrama Titanic Sinks Tonight aired by BBC Two. In January 2026, she appeared in Lucy Worsley's Victorian Murder Club also aired by BBC Two.

== Awards ==
- 2010: Betty Trask Prize for Black Mamba Boy
- 2013: Granta "Best of Young British Novelists"
- 2014: Africa39 list of the most promising writers under the age of 40 from Sub-Saharan Africa
- 2014: Somerset Maugham Award for The Orchard of Lost Souls
- 2022: Wales Book of the Year for The Fortune Men
- 2024: Honorary degree of Doctor of Literature Honoris Causa, Royal Holloway, University of London, in recognition of her outstanding contribution to literature.

== Works ==
=== Novels ===
- Black Mamba Boy (2010)
- The Orchard of Lost Souls (2013)
- The Fortune Men (2021)

=== Selected shorter writings ===
- "Filsan", Granta 123: Best of Young British Novelists 4, 16 April 2013.
- "Migrants for whom the Sahara proved a graveyard started out in hope", The Guardian, 1 November 2013.
- "Sasayama", Granta 127: Japan, 25 June 2014.
- "Somalis returning to the motherland are finding their foreign ways out of favour", The Guardian, 11 September 2015.
- "Britain’s clampdown on FGM is leaving young girls traumatised", The Guardian, 7 September 2017.
- "How many dead Somalis does it take for us to care?", The Guardian, 23 October 2017.
- "What We Lost in the Grenfell Tower Fire", LitHub, 24 October 2017.
