= Damon Galgut =

South African writer (born 1963)

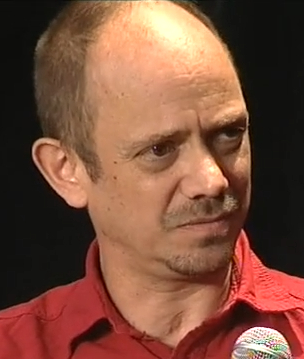
- Galgut in 2013
- Born: 12 November 1963 (age 62); Pretoria, South Africa
- Education: Pretoria Boys High School; University of Cape Town
- Occupations: Novelist; playwright
- Writing career
- Genres: Drama, fiction, short stories
- Notable works: The Good Doctor (2003); The Promise (2021)
- Notable awards: Booker Prize (2021)

Damon Galgut (born 12 November 1963) is a South African novelist and playwright. He was awarded the 2021 Booker Prize for his novel The Promise, having previously been shortlisted for the award in 2003 and 2010.

== Early life and education ==
Galgut was born on 12 November 1963 in Pretoria, South Africa. His father was from a Jewish family and his mother converted to Judaism. At the age of six, he was diagnosed with lymphoma.

Galgut was head boy of Pretoria Boys High School, matriculating in 1981. He then studied drama at the University of Cape Town.

== Literary career ==
Galgut wrote his first novel, A Sinless Season (1982), when he was 17. His next book, a collection of short stories called Small Circle of Beings (1988), includes an eponymous novella that describes a mother's struggle with her son's illness. His novel The Beautiful Screaming of Pigs (1991) won the Central News Agency Literary Award in 1992. His next novel, The Quarry (1995), was made into a feature film, with a 1998 release. A second feature film version was released in 2020.

After The Good Doctor, his fifth novel, was published in 2003, Galgut's work became better known outside South Africa. The story of two contrasting characters in a remote, rural hospital in post-apartheid South Africa, The Good Doctor was enthusiastically received by critics. It was shortlisted for the Booker Prize in 2003 and also won the Commonwealth Writers Prize for Best Book: Africa (2003).

His novel In a Strange Room was shortlisted for the 2010 Booker Prize for fiction. Reviewing the novel in The Guardian, Jan Morris wrote, "I doubt if any book in 2010 will contain more memorable evocations of place than In a Strange Room." She described In a Strange Room as a "beautiful" book that is "strikingly conceived and hauntingly written". His 2014 Arctic Summer presents a fictionalized account, "drawn with fidelity to the historical persona of the English novelist", of the middle years in the life of novelist E. M. Forster, focusing on Forster's years in India and Alexandria. The novel, "a remarkable, lyrical tribute to the remarkable nature of [Forster's] understanding as a human being and as an artist", was short-listed for the Walter Scott Prize.

Galgut's novel The Promise won the 2021 Booker Prize, making him the third writer from South Africa to win the Booker, following Nadine Gordimer and J. M. Coetzee, who has won twice. Galgut says the theme of the book is time. The original idea came from a conversation with a friend, who is the last surviving member of his family, and told Galgut about the funerals he had attended for his mother, father, brother, and sister.

In addition to his novels, Galgut has written several plays. At the time of his Booker win, Galgut was working on a collection of short stories.

== Personal life ==
Galgut is gay and has stated that this leads him to focus on more male-oriented relationships in his writing. Galgut credits the Roald Dahl short story "Pig" as having had the greatest influence on his writing.

He has lived in Cape Town since the early 1990s. He is a keen traveller and wrote much of The Good Doctor in a hotel in Goa. He describes himself as "obsessed" with yoga, and for some time did not own a car or a television. Galgut has a "fetish around stationery" and writes longhand on notebooks first rather than on a typewriter or computer. After two complete drafts, he then transfers it to the computer. He has used a particular tortoiseshell Parker fountain pen since he was about 20.

== Awards and honours ==
Year	Title	Award	Category	Result	Ref
2003	The Good Doctor	Booker Prize	—	Shortlisted	
2004	The Good Doctor	Commonwealth Writers Prize	Best Book Award (Africa Region)	Won	
2005	The Good Doctor	International Dublin Literary Award	—	Won	
2009	Impostor	Commonwealth Writers Prize	Best Book Award (Africa Region)	Shortlisted	
2010	In a Strange Room	Booker Prize	—	Shortlisted	
2015	Arctic Summer	Walter Scott Prize	—	Shortlisted	
2015	Arctic Summer	Barry Ronge Fiction Prize	—	Won	
2021	The Promise	Booker Prize	—	Won	

== Works ==
=== Novels ===
- A Sinless Season (Jonathan Ball, 1982)
- Small Circle of Beings (Lowry Publishers, 1988)
- The Beautiful Screaming of Pigs (Scribner, 1991; 1992 CNA Award)
- The Quarry (Viking, 1995)
- The Good Doctor (Grove Press, 2004)
- The Impostor (Atlantic Books, 2008)
- In a Strange Room (Atlantic Books, 2010)
- Arctic Summer (2014)
- The Promise (Europa Editions, 2021)

=== Plays ===
- Echoes of Anger (1983)
- Party for Mother
- Alive and Kicking
- The Green's Keeper
