= Anuk Arudpragasam =

Sri Lankan Tamil novelist (born 1988)

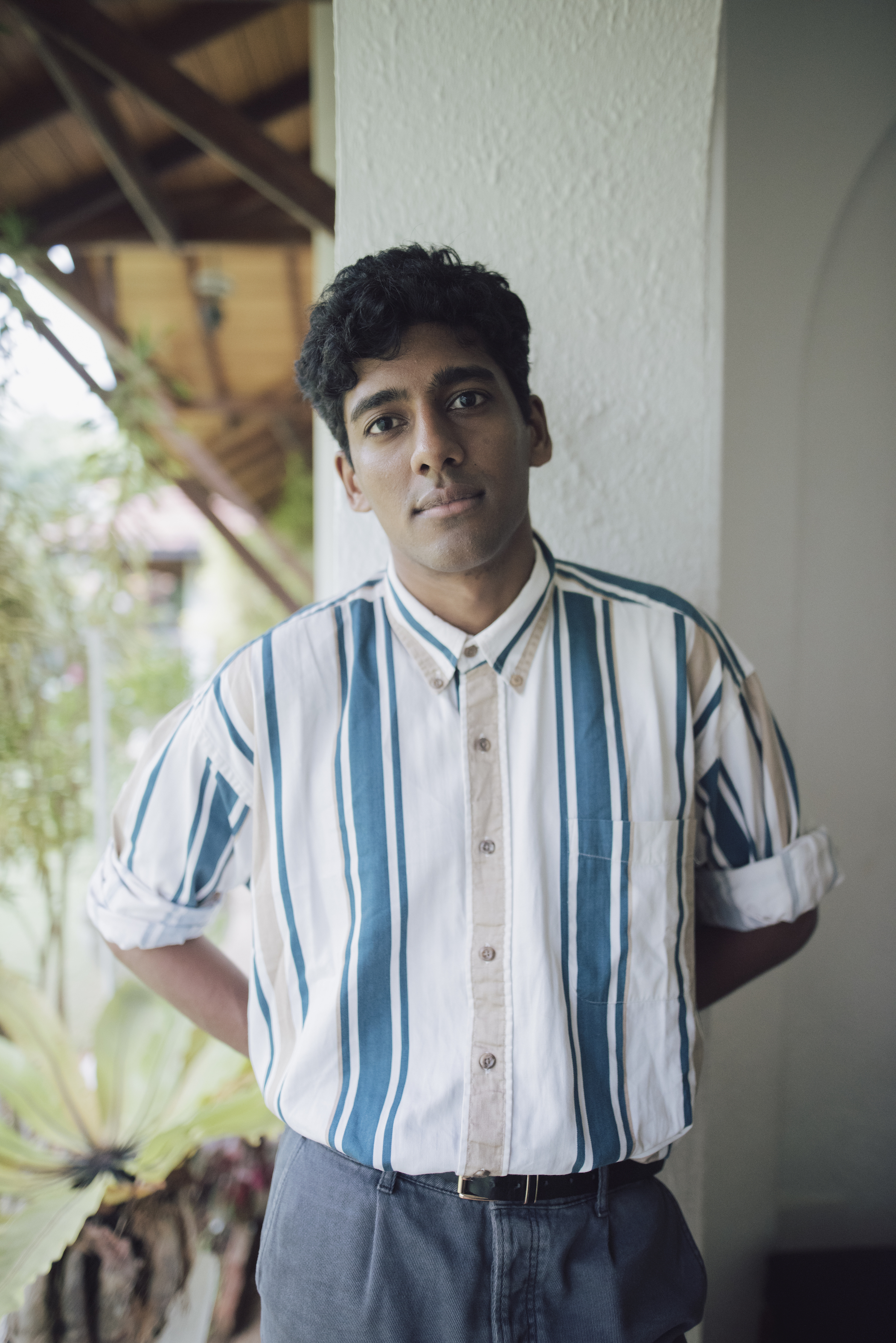
- Anuk Arudpragasam in Colombo, Sri Lanka
- Born: 1988 (age 37–38)
- Education: Stanford University (B.A.); Columbia University (PhD)
- Occupation: Novelist
- Writing career
- Notable works: The Story of a Brief Marriage (2016); A Passage North (2021)
- Website: www.anukarud.com

Anuk Arudpragasam (Tamil: அனுக் அருட்பிரகாசம்) (born 1988) is a Sri Lankan Tamil novelist writing in English and Tamil. His debut novel The Story of a Brief Marriage was published in 2016 by Flatiron Books/Granta Books and was subsequently translated into French, German, Czech, Mandarin, Dutch and Italian. The novel, which takes place in 2009 during the final stages of the Sri Lankan Civil War, won the DSC Prize for South Asian Literature, and was shortlisted for the Dylan Thomas Prize and the German Internationaler Literaturpreis. His second novel, A Passage North, was published in 2021 and was shortlisted for the Booker Prize.

== Early life and education ==
Arudpragasam was born in 1988 in Colombo, Sri Lanka, to Tamil parents. He grew up in a wealthy family in Colombo. His Tamil family originally came from the northeast of the country. However, he himself never came into direct contact with the civil war that raged in the northeast from 1983 to 2009. Although he did not come from a literary family, his parents encouraged him to read books from a young age. Arudpragasam did not follow their advice until the age of 15 or 16, when he found a taste for philosophical literature in the nearby Vijitha Yapa bookstore. He moved to the United States at the age of 18 to attend Stanford University, graduating with a B.A. in 2010. After graduating from Stanford, he lived in the Indian state of Tamil Nadu for a year. He later began a PhD in philosophy at Columbia University, which he completed in 2019.

== Career ==
=== The Story of a Brief Marriage (2016) ===
The novel, written between 2011 and 2014, describes a day and a night in the lives of two young Tamils, Dinesh and Ganga, who are forced into a marriage as the Sri Lankan army intensifies its bombardment of the camp on the north-eastern coast where they are taking refuge. "I grew up in the south of Sri Lanka in a well-off family, as insulated as someone could be from the war," Arudpragasam told Guernica magazine. "It was an attempt to cross certain kinds of differences in experience between myself and these many other people in the north of the country who I had become separated from."

A review in The New York Times commended the novel for "giving the innocents a place in history" and making readers "kneel before the elegance of the human spirit". The Wall Street Journal celebrated it as a "small work of art whittled from atrocity." Novelist Colm Toibin praised Arudpragasam's dense and attentive style: "Every image in the book, including the most desolate, is rendered with precision and an aura of pure truth and tenderness." The book was listed as one of the best novels of 2016 by The Wall Street Journal, NPR, and the Financial Times. It won the DSC Prize for South Asian Literature and the Shakti Bhatt First Book Award, and was shortlisted for the Dylan Thomas Prize and the Internationaler Literaturpreis.

=== A Passage North (2021) ===
Arudpragasam's second novel, A Passage North (Granta Books), was shortlisted for the 2021 Booker Prize. The novel is an attempt to come to terms with life in the wake of the devastation of Sri Lanka's 30-year civil war. He says "'A Passage North is more about witnessing violence from afar than it is about experiencing it up close," which is closer to his own experience of the Sri Lankan civil war.

=== Third novel ===
Arudpragasam is currently working on a third novel "about mothers and daughters in the Tamil diaspora, set partly in New York and partly in Toronto."

== Bibliography ==
- The Story of a Brief Marriage. New York: Flatiron Books. 6 September 2016. ISBN 978-1-250-07240-5.
  - The Story of a Brief Marriage. London: Granta Books. 6 October 2016. ISBN 978-1-78378-237-6.
  - The Story of a Brief Marriage. New Delhi: Fourth Estate / HarperCollins Publishers India. October 2016. ISBN 978-9352640829.
- A Passage North. London / New York: Hogarth. 13 July 2021. ISBN 978-0-593-23070-1.
  - A Passage North. Delhi: Hamish Hamilton / Penguin India. 13 July 2021. ISBN 978-0-670-09489-9.
  - A Passage North. London: Granta Books. 15 July 2021. ISBN 978-1-78378-694-7.
