= Jewish Tribune (UK) =

British Haredi Jewish newspaper

The Jewish Tribune
- Type: Weekly newspaper
- Format: Berliner
- Owner: Agudath Yisroel of GB
- Editor: Dan Levy
- Founded: 1962
- Language: English; Yiddish
- Headquarters: 97 Stamford Hill, London, United Kingdom
- Circulation: c. 2800
- Website: jewishtribune.com

The Jewish Tribune was a privately owned Haredi weekly newspaper based in Stamford Hill with offices in Golders Green, London and Manchester. Founded in 1962, it appeared in newspaper form every Thursday, (and online in PDF format) providing up to date news from UK Jewish community and Israel along with views, social and cultural reports. It also contained editorials and a spectrum of readers' opinions. Foreign, military and diplomatic correspondent James J. Marlow wrote the Middle East articles including features with analysis and matters concerning British politics. Senior UK political and Manchester correspondent was Bezalel Cohen. Eminent historian Dr. Yaakov Wise was a contributor until his death in 2018. With a claimed circulation of over 2800 copies being sold each week, the paper was the fifth largest Jewish paper in England after The Jewish Chronicle, the Jewish News, the Jewish Telegraph and Hamodia and was the third oldest continuously published Jewish newspaper in England.

The Jewish Tribune was published by Agudath Israel of Great Britain.

It was the only newspaper published weekly in the UK to have a section in Yiddish.

In August 2010, rumours circulated that the newspaper would fold following the Rosh Hashana edition but the newspaper surmounted its problems and continued to publish.. The format was changed, and publication was moved to Wednesday, but problems persisted. The newspaper finally closed. The final issue was 20 May 2026.
