= Tzelem =

British Jewish social activism organization

Tzelem was founded in 2014 to organise Jewish clerical voices on social and economic justice issues in the United Kingdom. It is unique in its conception as a clerical, cross-communal, campaigning organisation. It is founded on the Jewish principle that people are all created b’tzelem Elokim – in the image of God. Tzelem seeks to continue the Jewish social activist tradition by taking action and providing a critique to the problems at the root of society, economy and treatment of the vulnerable.

As an activist organisation, Tzelem provides education and training for its rabbinic and cantorial members by bringing in outside speakers and their expertise. It also provides educational material for the wider community on issues of social and economic justice. Tzelem has access to skilled advisors who are experts in their field and guide the organisation in their campaigning and work with other organisations.

Tzelem acts as a point of contact between clergy and provides a space for them to communicate, share resources, and join together in campaigns, actions, and other social justice activity. It acts as a virtual network allowing conversations and problem solving between Jewish clergy who would not otherwise have the opportunity to discuss these issues, with physical meetings as members see fit. It also provides support for congregations, if they so wish, in linking them with social justice initiatives and activists. It helps direct rabbis to useful resources and has a strong bank of such resources on issues of working towards social and economic justice.

Over 100 Tzelem UK Rabbis asked the government to accelerate and expand its refugee program during the Syrian Refugee Crisis
