= In a Strange Room =

Novel by Damon Galgut

- Author: Damon Galgut
- Language: English
- Genre: Novel
- Publisher: Atlantic Books
- Publication date: April 2010
- Publication place: South Africa
- Media type: Print (hardback & paperback)
- Pages: 256 pp (hardback edition)
- ISBN: 978-1848873223 (hardback edition)

In a Strange Room is a 2010 novel by South African writer Damon Galgut, published by Atlantic Books. It was shortlisted for the Man Booker Prize in 2010, as well as for the Ondaatje Prize.

== Plot synopsis ==
The novel is divided into three sections: "The Follower", "The Lover" and "The Guardian". It concerns Damon, a South African writer who is infected by wanderlust as he goes backpacking abroad and meet different people. In "The Follower", Damon meets a German backpacker named Reiner in Greece, and becomes his travelling companion. Subsequently, in "The Lover", he follows a Frenchman and two Swiss fraternal twins—a man and a woman—travelling through Africa. In both, Damon is aware of a homoerotic feeling which binds him to Reiner and Jerome, one of the twins. The final section takes place in India, where he is minding a friend, Anna, with severe psychiatric illness and who is threatening suicide.
