= Kisharon =

British charitable organization

Kisharon is a British charity, founded in 1976 by Chava Lehman. Its resources are all in London. Kisharon specialises in caring for and educating Jewish children and adults with disabilities.

Typically, Kisharon students may have one or more of the following: Autism spectrum disorder, a disorder causing impaired language and social functioning; Down syndrome, a chromosomal anomaly causing intellectual disability; or cerebral palsy, a disorder characterized by spastic movements. A growing proportion of students have complex and multiple physical disabilities.

Kisharon has a range of resources that cater for the needs of these people, young and old. Tuffkid Nursery is a nursery for both children with special needs and those who are mainstream. Kisharon Day School caters for children and young people up to the age of 19, at which point they can move to Kisharon Adult Services. Kisharon's Asher Loftus Business Centre offers vocational training and experience, with a variety of small businesses run by the students. Kisharon also offers a small number of residential opportunities for men and women, including Eagle Lodge and the Hanna Schwalbe Home. A variety of services are also offered through Hackney Community Inclusion.
