= Jonathan Ball (publishing house) =

British publishing house

Jonathan Ball Publishers
- Parent company: Media24
- Founded: 1976
- Founder: Jonathan Ball
- Country of origin: South Africa
- Headquarters location: Johannesburg
- Key people: Jonathan Ball
- Publication types: Books
- Nonfiction topics: South African politics, history, biography, and current affairs
- Official website: www.jonathanball.co.za

Jonathan Ball Publishers is a South African publishing house founded in 1976 by Jonathan Ball.

It is best known for publishing and distributing high-quality non-fiction books, including works on South African politics, history, biography, and current affairs, as well as selected fiction titles. The company also acts as the local distributor for several major international publishing imprints, bringing global bestsellers to the South African market.

Jonathan Ball Publishers has worked with some of the country’s most prominent authors and commentators, and its catalogue includes both critical investigative works and popular reads. The head office is in Johannesburg, with additional operations in Cape Town.

Jonathan Ball, the company's founder, died on 3 April 2021.
