= Maggie Shipstead =

American novelist

- Born: 1983 (age 42–43); Mission Viejo, California, U.S.
- Education: Harvard University (BA); University of Iowa (MFA)
- Occupation: Novelist
- Known for: Novels, Short Stories, Essays, Travel Writing
- Notable work: Seating Arrangements, Astonish Me, Great Circle, You Have a Friend in 10A: Stories
- Awards: Stegner Fellowship, Dylan Thomas Prize (2012), Los Angeles Times Book Prize (First Fiction, 2012) National Endowment of the Arts (2020)
- Website: www.maggieshipstead.com

Maggie Shipstead (born July 1983) is an American novelist, short story author, essayist, and travel writer. She is the author of Seating Arrangements (2012) Astonish Me (2014), Great Circle (2021), and the short story collection You Have a Friend in 10A (2022).

== Early life and education ==
Shipstead grew up in Mission Viejo, California. Her mother was a professor of child development and placed Shipstead into a program for "gifted" children based on an IQ test at five years old. She was a competitive horse rider.

Shipstead attended Harvard University and while there she considered becoming a writer for the first time after taking Zadie Smith's course on creative writing. After earning an MFA at Iowa Writers' Workshop, she was awarded a Stegner Fellowship.

== Writing career ==
After finishing the Stegner fellowship, she published her first novel, Seating Arrangements, in 2012. It describes a wedding weekend on a monied, fictional New England island, and received critical acclaim. The New York Times described it as a "smart and frothy debut novel," and it received the Los Angeles Times Book Prize for First Fiction and the Dylan Thomas Prize.

Her second novel, Astonish Me (2014), spans three decades of intrigue and romance in the ballet world starting in 1977. It received mixed reviews, with the New York Times describing the prose as "unexceptional, subservient to the momentum of Shipstead’s schematic plot." However, The Guardian praised it for "nimble writing barely misses a beat, any plot implausibility amply compensated for by her serious addressing of a devotion to artistic endeavour that crosses generations and captivates opposing individuals."

In 2021, she published her third novel, Great Circle, to wide acclaim. The Washington Post described it as a "a soaring work of historical fiction about a “lady pilot” in the mid-20th century." It was shortlisted for the 2021 Booker Prize and for the 2022 Women's Prize for Fiction. It portrays a fearless female aviator, Marian Graves, who struggles to break through the sexist norms of aviation from the 1910s-1950s, while framing the story through the eyes of an actress who is portraying Graves on screen in present day. It was optioned by Picturestart in the summer of 2021 for development into a television show, with Shipstead serving as an executive producer.

In 2022, Shipstead published the short story collection You Have a Friend in 10A. Many of the short stories had been previously published in journals such as Tin House and Virginia Quarterly Review in the decade leading up to the publication of Great Circle. While many of the ten stories were praised, some reviewers criticized the book for being inconsistent: while The New York Times praised the writing of "La Moretta" as a standout, it noted that other stories seemed "plainly unfinished."

Shipstead also spends much of her time traveling the world and is an essayist and travel writer. She has written for magazines and newspapers including Condé Nast Traveler, The New York Times, and Departures.

== Personal life ==
Shipstead lives in Los Angeles, California with her dog, Gus. Though based there, she travels extensively. She wrote about a romantic relationship she had with a man she met on a trip through the subantarctic islands south of New Zealand for Modern Love.

== Bibliography ==
- — (2012). Seating Arrangements. New York: Alfred A. Knopf. ISBN 978-0-307-59946-9. LCCN 2012005049. OCLC 754714005.
- — (2014). Astonish Me. New York: Alfred A. Knopf. ISBN 978-0-307-96290-4. LCCN 2013026781. OCLC 854285679.
- — (2021). Great Circle. New York: Alfred A. Knopf. ISBN 978-0-525-65697-5. LCCN 2020021074. OCLC 1154075263.
- — (2022). You Have a Friend In 10A: Stories. Transworld Publishers Limited. ISBN 978-0-85752-682-3.
