= Hugh Jackman filmography and discography =

Filmography

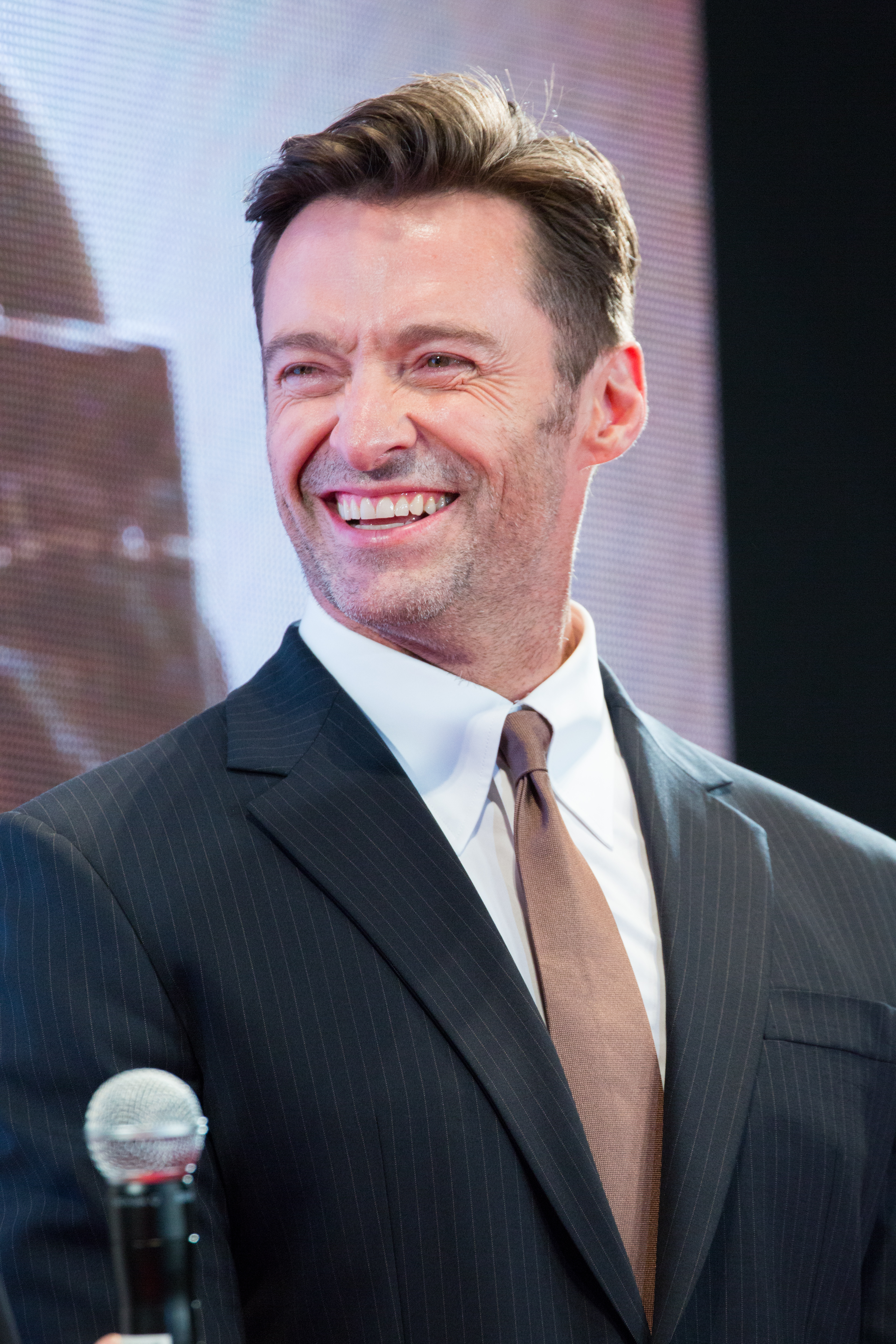
Jackman at the Logan premiere in Tokyo, Japan

Australian actor Hugh Jackman is known for his leading man roles on stage and screen. Jackman gained stardom for his portrayal of the Marvel Comics superhero Wolverine from the X-Men film series in 10 films starting with X-Men (2000) to most recently, Deadpool & Wolverine (2024), set in the Marvel Cinematic Universe. The role earned him the Guinness World Record for "longest career as a live-action Marvel character".

On film, he won the Golden Globe Award and was nominated for the Academy Award for his portrayal of Jean Valjean in the musical epic film Les Misérables (2012). He also portrayed Gabriel Van Helsing in the action film Van Helsing (2004), P. T. Barnum in the musical drama The Greatest Showman (2017), and Gary Hart in the political drama The Front Runner (2018). He took starring roles in the romantic comedy Kate & Leopold (2001), the crime comedy Scoop (2006), the thriller The Prestige (2006), the romantic drama The Fountain (2006), the romance adventure Australia (2008), the action film Real Steel (2011), the psychological drama Prisoners (2013), the science-fiction film Reminiscence (2021), and the drama The Son (2022).

Jackman started his career on stage in Australia in Beauty and the Beast (1995), and Sunset Boulevard (1996). He received a Laurence Olivier Award for Best Actor in a Musical nomination for his breakthrough role as Curly McLain in the Rodgers and Hammerstein musical revival Oklahoma! (1998) on the West End. He made his Broadway debut playing Peter Allen in the musical The Boy from Oz (2004) for which he won the Tony Award for Best Actor in a Musical. He returned to the Broadway stage playing Prof. Harold Hill in the revival of the Meredith Willson musical The Music Man (2021–2023).

He played a corrupt superintendent in the HBO television movie Bad Education (2019). Jackman hosted Saturday Night Live in 2001, the Tony Awards four times: 57th Tony Awards in 2003, 58th Tony Awards in 2004, 59th Tony Awards in 2005, and 68th Tony Awards in 2014, and the 81st Academy Awards in 2009. He has also voiced roles for Big Mouth in 2021, Human Resources from 2022 to 2023, The Simpsons in 2022, and Rick and Morty in 2023.

== Screen credits ==
=== Film ===
List of Hugh Jackman film credits
Year	Title	Role	Notes	Ref.
1999	Erskineville Kings	Wace		
1999	Paperback Hero	Jack Willis		
2000	X-Men	James "Logan" Howlett / Wolverine		
2001	Someone like You	Eddie		
2001	Swordfish	Stanley Jobson		
2001	Kate & Leopold	Leopold Alexis Elijah Walker Thomas Gareth Mountbatten		
2003	X2	James "Logan" Howlett / Wolverine		
2004	Van Helsing	Gabriel Van Helsing		
2004	Van Helsing: The London Assignment	Gabriel Van Helsing	Voice role	
2005	Stories of Lost Souls	Roger	Segment: "Standing Room Only"	
2006	X-Men: The Last Stand	James "Logan" Howlett / Wolverine		
2006	Scoop	Peter Lyman		
2006	The Prestige	Robert Angier and Gerald Root		
2006	Flushed Away	Roddy St. James	Voice role	
2006	Happy Feet	Memphis	Voice role	
2006	The Fountain	Tomás, Tommy and Tom Creo		
2008	Deception	Wyatt Bose	Also producer	
2008	Australia	The Drover		
2008	The Burning Season	Narrator	Documentary film; Voice role	
2009	X-Men Origins: Wolverine	James "Logan" Howlett / Wolverine	Also producer	
2011	X-Men: First Class	James "Logan" Howlett / Wolverine	Uncredited cameo	
2011	Snow Flower and the Secret Fan	Arthur		
2011	Real Steel	Charlie Kenton		
2012	Butter	Boyd Bolton		
2012	Rise of the Guardians	The Easter Bunny	Voice role	
2012	Les Misérables	Jean Valjean		
2013	Movie 43	Davis		
2013	Prisoners	Keller Dover		
2013	The Wolverine	James "Logan" Howlett / Wolverine		
2014	X-Men: Days of Future Past	James "Logan" Howlett / Wolverine		
2014	Night at the Museum: Secret of the Tomb	King Arthur / Himself	Uncredited cameo	
2015	Chappie	Vincent Moore		
2015	Me and Earl and the Dying Girl	Himself	Voice cameo	
2015	Pan	Blackbeard		
2016	Eddie the Eagle	Bronson Peary		
2016	X-Men: Apocalypse	James "Logan" Howlett / Wolverine	Uncredited cameo	
2017	Logan	James "Logan" Howlett / Wolverine	Also appears as Logan's clone, X-24	
2017	The Greatest Showman	P. T. Barnum		
2018	Deadpool 2	James "Logan" Howlett / Wolverine	Archival footage from X-Men Origins: Wolverine	
2018	The Front Runner	Gary Hart		
2019	Missing Link	Sir Lionel Frost	Voice role	
2019	Bad Education	Frank Tassone		
2021	Free Guy	Masked Player in Alley	Voice cameo	
2021	Reminiscence	Nicolas "Nick" Bannister		
2022	The Son	Peter Miller		
2024	Deadpool & Wolverine	James "Logan" Howlett / Wolverine		
2025	Song Sung Blue	Mike Sardina		
2026	The Sheep Detectives	George Hardy		
2026	The Death of Robin Hood	Robin Hood	Also producer	
2026	Mighty Mary	Narrator	Documentary film; voice role; also executive producer	
2026	Avengers: Doomsday †	—N/a	Post-production, Additional Literary Material	

=== Television ===
List of Hugh Jackman television credits
Year	Title	Role	Notes	Ref.
1994	Law of the Land	Charles "Chicka" McCray	Episode: "Win, Lose and Draw"	
1995	Correlli	Kevin Jones	10 episodes	
1995	Blue Heelers	Brady Jackson	Episode: "Just Desserts"	
1996	The Man from Snowy River	Duncan Jones	5 episodes	
1998	Halifax f.p.	Eric Ringer	Episode: "Afraid of the Dark"; released on DVD as Profile of a Serial Killer	
1999	Oklahoma!	Curly McLain	Television play	
2001	Saturday Night Live	Himself / Host	Episode: "Hugh Jackman/Mick Jagger"	
2003	57th Tony Awards	Himself / Host	Television special	
2004	58th Tony Awards	Himself / Host	Television special	
2005	59th Tony Awards	Himself / Host	Television special	
2006	The Chaser's War on Everything	Himself	Footage of him at a press conference being interviewed.	
2007	Viva Laughlin	Nicky Fontana	Episode: "Pilot"; also executive producer	
2009	81st Academy Awards	Himself / Host	Television special	
2011	Saturday Night Live	Daniel Radcliffe	Episode: "Ben Stiller/Foster the People"	
2014	68th Tony Awards	Himself / Host	Television special	
2020	Home Movie: The Princess Bride	Prince Humperdinck	Episode: "Chapter One: As You Wish"	
2021	Big Mouth	Himself (voice)	Episode: "No Nut November"	
2022–2023	Human Resources	Dante the Addiction Angel (voice)	Recurring role	
2022	The Simpsons	Janitor (voice)	Episode: "Poorhouse Rock"	
2023	Koala Man	Big Greg (voice)	Recurring role, 8 episodes	
2023	Rick and Morty	Himself (voice)	Episode: "How Poopy Got His Poop Back"	
2023	Faraway Downs	The Drover/Jack Clancy	Recurring role; alternate cut of Australia	
2024	Megafauna	Narrator	2 episodes	
2024	Marvel Studios: Assembled	Himself	Episode: "The Making of Deadpool & Wolverine"	

== Stage performances ==
Year	Title	Role	Notes	Ref.
1994	The Season at Sarsaparilla	Unknown	Australia	
1994	Thark	Unknown	Australia	
1995–1996	Beauty and the Beast	Gaston	Princess Theatre, Australia	
1996–1997	Sunset Boulevard	Joe Gillis	Regent Theatre, Australia	
1998	Oklahoma!	Curly McLain	Olivier Theatre, West End	
1999	Oklahoma!	Curly McLain	Lyceum Theatre, West End	
2002	Carousel	Billy Bigelow	Carnegie Hall, Concert	
2003–2004	The Boy from Oz	Peter Allen	Imperial Theatre, Broadway	
2006	The Boy from Oz	Peter Allen	Australia arena tour	
2009	A Steady Rain	Denny	Gerald Schoenfeld Theatre, Broadway	
2011	On the Twentieth Century	Oscar Jaffee	Roundabout Theatre Company reading	
2011	Hugh Jackman: in Performance	Himself	Curran Theatre, San Francisco	
2011	Hugh Jackman: in Concert	Himself	Princess of Wales Theatre, Toronto	
2011	Hugh Jackman: Back on Broadway	Himself	Broadhurst Theatre, Broadway	
2014	The River	The Man	Circle in the Square Theatre, Broadway	
2015	Broadway to Oz	Himself	Australia tour	
2019	The Man. The Music. The Show.	Himself	World arena tour	
2021–2023	The Music Man	Professor Harold Hill	Winter Garden Theatre, Broadway	
2025	Sexual Misconduct of the Middle Classes	Jon	Minetta Lane Theatre, Off-Broadway	
2026	Sexual Misconduct of the Middle Classes	Jon	Minetta Lane Theatre, Off-Broadway	
2026	New Born	Performer	Minetta Lane Theatre, Off-Broadway	

== Music ==
=== Music video ===
List of Hugh Jackman music video credits
Year	Title	Artist	Role	Notes	Ref.
2024	"Chk Chk Boom"	Stray Kids	Wolverine	Cameo	

=== Albums ===
Credits adapted from AllMusic:

Musical albums

List of Hugh Jackman musical album credits
Title	Year
Beauty and the Beast	1995
Oklahoma!	1999
The Boy from Oz	2003
Broadway's Greatest Gifts: Carols for a Cure, Vol. 5	2003
Broadway: The American Musical	2004
Broadway: America's Music 1935-2005	2005
Broadway Today: Broadway, 1993-2005	2005
The 20th Century Masters - The Millennium Collection: The Best of Broadway	2006
Broadway Gold Decca	2007

Soundtrack albums

List of albums, with selected chart positions and certifications
Title	Album details	Peak chart positions										Certifications
Title	Album details	AUS	CAN	FRA	GER	IRL	JAP	NZ	KOR	UK	US	Certifications
Happy Feet: Music from the Motion Picture	Released: 31 October 2006; Label: Warner Sunset Records, Atlantic Records	4	—	—	—	—	—	—	—	—	—	
Les Misérables: Highlights from the Motion Picture Soundtrack	Released: 21 December 2012; Label: Republic Records	2	3	81	18	1	11	1	1	1	1	ARIA: Gold; RIAJ: Gold; RIAA: Gold; RMNZ: Gold
Fly: Songs Inspired by the Film "Eddie the Eagle"	Released: 1 April 2016	—	—	—	—	—	—	—	—	—	—	
The Greatest Showman: Original Motion Picture Soundtrack	Released: 8 December 2017; Label: Atlantic Records; Format: CD, Digital download	1	3	—	5	1	1	1	17	1	1	ARIA: Platinum; BPI: 8× Platinum; MC: Platinum; IFPI DEN: Platinum; RIAA: 2× Platinum; RIAJ: Gold; RMNZ: Platinum

=== Charted and certified songs ===
List of songs, with selected chart positions, showing year released and album name
Title	Year	Peak chart positions						Certifications	Album
Title	Year	AUS	IRE	FRA	NZ	UK	US	Certifications	Album
"The Greatest Show" (with Zac Efron, Zendaya, Keala Settle and The Greatest Showman Ensemble)	2017	42	34	110	— (Note: "The Greatest Show" did not enter the NZ Top 40 Singles Chart, but peaked at number 3 on the NZ Heatseeker Singles Chart.)	20	88	ARIA: Platinum; BPI: Platinum; RIAA: Platinum	The Greatest Showman: Original Motion Picture Soundtrack
"A Million Dreams" (with Michelle Williams and Ziv Zaifman)	2017	—	45	199	—	22	—	BPI: Platinum; RIAA: Platinum; RMNZ: Platinum	The Greatest Showman: Original Motion Picture Soundtrack
"A Million Dreams (Reprise)" (with Austyn Johnson and Cameron Seely)	2017	—	—	—	—	—	—	BPI: Gold; RIAA: Gold; RMNZ: Gold	The Greatest Showman: Original Motion Picture Soundtrack
"Come Alive" (with Zendaya, Keala Settle, Daniel Everidge and The Greatest Showman Ensemble)	2017	—	70	—	— (Note: "Come Alive" did not enter the NZ Top 40 Singles Chart, but peaked at number 8 on the NZ Heatseeker Singles Chart.)	55	— (Note: "Come Alive" did not enter the Billboard Hot 100, but peaked at No. 21 on the Bubbling Under Hot 100 Singles chart.)	BPI: Gold; RIAA: Gold	The Greatest Showman: Original Motion Picture Soundtrack
"The Other Side" (with Zac Efron)	2017	—	54	—	—	48	—	BPI: Platinum; RIAA: Gold; RMNZ: Platinum	The Greatest Showman: Original Motion Picture Soundtrack
"From Now On" (with The Greatest Showman Ensemble)	2017	—	65	—	—	71	—	BPI: Platinum; RIAA: Gold; RMNZ: Platinum	The Greatest Showman: Original Motion Picture Soundtrack
"—" denotes releases that did not chart or were not released in that territory.

== Video games ==
List of Hugh Jackman video game credits
Title	Year	Voice role	Notes	Ref.
X2: Wolverine's Revenge	2003	Logan / Wolverine	Likeness only; Logan / Wolverine voiced by Mark Hamill	
Van Helsing	2004	Gabriel Van Helsing		
X-Men: The Official Game	2006	Logan / Wolverine		
X-Men Origins: Wolverine	2009	Logan / Wolverine		

== See also ==
- List of awards and nominations received by Hugh Jackman
