= List of awards and nominations received by Hugh Jackman =

Hugh Jackman awards and nominations
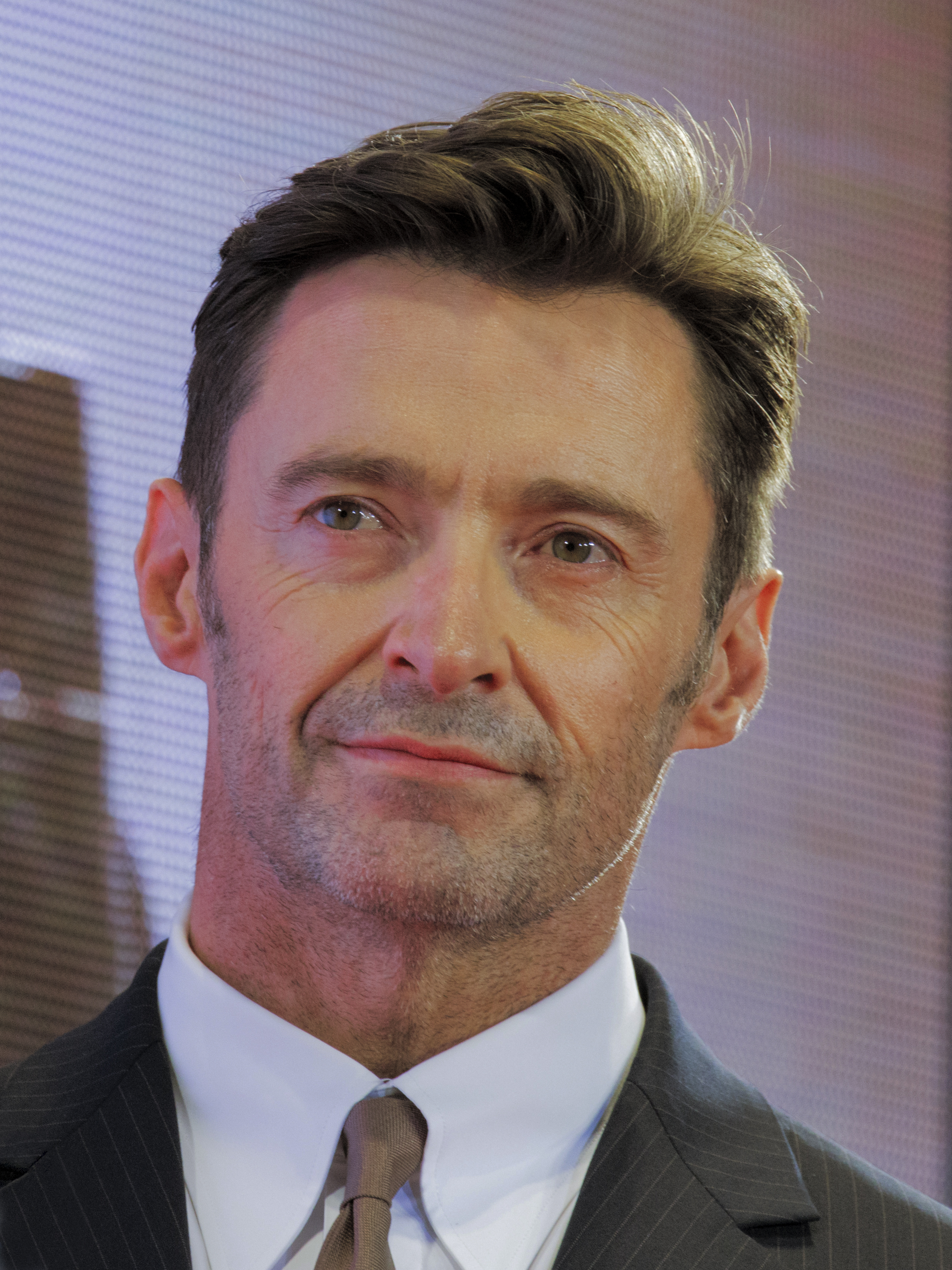
- Jackman in Logan (2017) film premiere in Japan
Awards and nominations
Award	Wins	Nominations
Golden Globe	1	4
Grammy	1	1
Academy Awards	0	1
BAFTA Awards	0	1
Emmy Awards	1	5
Screen Actors Guild Awards	0	2
Tony Awards	2	3

Totals (Note: Certain award groups do not simply award one winner. They acknowledge several different recipients, have runners-up, and have third place. Since this is a specific recognition and is different from losing an award, runner-up mentions are considered wins in this award tally. For simplification and to avoid errors, each award in this list has been presumed to have had a prior nomination.)
- Wins: 38
- Nominations: 17

Hugh Jackman is an Australian actor, producer and singer known for his diverse leading man roles onstage and screen. Jackman has received several awards including a Primetime Emmy Award, a Golden Globe Award, a Grammy Award, and two Tony Awards as well as nominations for an Academy Award, a British Academy Film Award, two Screen Actors Guild Award, and a Laurence Olivier Award. He was inducted in the Hollywood Walk of Fame in 2012, received a Special Tony Award in 2012, and earned the Companion of the Order of Australia in 2019.

Jackman won the Golden Globe Award for Best Actor in a Motion Picture – Musical or Comedy for his portrayal of Jean Valjean in the musical epic Les Misérables (2012) and received nominations for the Academy Award for Best Actor, the BAFTA Award for Best Actor in a Leading Role, and the Screen Actors Guild Award for Outstanding Actor in a Leading Role. He was Globe-nominated for his roles as a time traveler in the romantic comedy Kate & Leopold (2001), P. T. Barnum in the musical drama The Greatest Showman (2017), and an emotional father in the drama The Son (2022). For his role as Wolverine in the X-Men franchise he won four MTV Movie Awards, four People's Choice Awards, and a Saturn Award.

On stage, Jackman won the Tony Award for Best Actor in a Musical for his role in the Broadway musical The Boy from Oz (2004). He Tony-nominated for playing Prof. Harold Hill in the Meredith Willson musical revival The Music Man (2022). On the West End stage he was nominated for the Laurence Olivier Award for Best Actor in a Musical for playing Curly McLain in the revival of the Rodgers and Hammerstein musical Oklahoma! (1999). He also won a Drama Desk Award, two Drama League Awards, a Theater World Award, an Outer Critics Circle Award, and five Mo Awards.

For his roles on television, he was nominated for the Primetime Emmy Award for Outstanding Lead Actor in a Limited or Anthology Series or Movie for playing a corrupt superintendent in the HBO film Bad Education (2019). He won the Primetime Emmy Award for Outstanding Individual Performance in a Variety or Music Program for hosting the 2005 Tony Awards. Jackman hosted the Tony Awards 4 times: in 2003, 2004, 2005, & 2014, plus hosted the 81st Academy Awards in 2008

== Major Associations ==
=== Academy Awards ===
Year	Category	Nominated work	Result	Ref.
2013	Best Actor	Les Misérables	Nominated	

=== BAFTA Awards ===
Year	Category	Nominated work	Result	Ref.
British Academy Film Awards
2013	Best Actor in a Leading Role	Les Misérables	Nominated	

=== Emmy Awards ===
Year	Category	Nominated work	Result	Ref.
Primetime Emmy Awards
2005	Outstanding Performance in a Variety or Music Program	58th Tony Awards	Won	
2006	Outstanding Performance in a Variety or Music Program	59th Tony Awards	Nominated	
2009	Outstanding Special Class Program	81st Academy Awards	Nominated	
2015	Outstanding Special Class Program	68th Tony Awards	Nominated	
2020	Outstanding Lead Actor in a Limited Series or Movie	Bad Education	Nominated	

=== Golden Globe Awards ===
Year	Category	Nominated work	Result	Ref.
2002	Best Actor in a Motion Picture – Musical or Comedy	Kate & Leopold	Nominated	
2013	Best Actor in a Motion Picture – Musical or Comedy	Les Misérables	Won	
2018	Best Actor in a Motion Picture – Musical or Comedy	The Greatest Showman	Nominated	
2023	Best Actor in a Motion Picture – Drama	The Son	Nominated	

=== Grammy Awards ===
Year	Category	Nominated work	Result	Ref.
2019	Best Compilation Soundtrack Album for Visual Media	The Greatest Showman	Won	

=== Screen Actors Guild Awards ===
Year	Category	Nominated work	Result	Ref.
2013	Outstanding Actor in a Motion Picture	Les Misérables	Nominated	
2013	Outstanding Ensemble Cast in a Motion Picture	Les Misérables	Nominated	

=== Laurence Olivier Award ===
Year	Category	Nominated work	Result	Ref.
1999	Best Actor in a Musical	Oklahoma!	Nominated	

=== Tony Awards ===
Year	Category	Nominated work	Result	Ref.
2004	Best Actor in a Musical	The Boy from Oz	Won	
2012	Special Tony Award		Honored	
2022	Best Actor in a Musical	The Music Man	Nominated	

== Miscellaneous awards ==
Organizations	Year	Category	Work	Result	Ref.
Audie Awards	2010	Audiobook of the Year	Nelson Mandela's Favorite African Folktales	Won	
Audie Awards	2010	Multi-Voiced Performance	Nelson Mandela's Favorite African Folktales	Won	
AACTA Awards	1999	Best Lead Actor	Erskineville Kings	Nominated	
AACTA Awards	2007	International Award for Best Actor	The Prestige	Nominated	
Bambi Award	2017	Entertainment Award		Won	
Critics' Choice Awards	2013	Best Movie Actor	Les Misérables	Nominated	
Critics' Choice Awards	2013	Best Movie Cast	Les Misérables	Nominated	
Critics' Choice Super Awards	2025	Best Actor in a Superhero Movie	Deadpool & Wolverine	Won	
Empire Awards	2004	Best Actor	X2	Nominated	
Empire Awards	2014	Empire Icon Award		Won	
Empire Awards	2018	Best Actor	Logan	Won	
MTV Movie Awards	2001	Best Movie On-Screen Team (with Halle Berry, James Marsden & Anna Paquin)	X-Men	Nominated	
MTV Movie Awards	2001	Best Movie Breakthrough Male Performance	X-Men	Nominated	
MTV Movie Awards	2004	Best Movie Fight (with Kelly Hu)	X-Men 2	Nominated	
MTV Movie Awards	2010	Best Movie Fight (with Liev Schreiber & Ryan Reynolds)	X-Men Origins: Wolverine	Nominated	
MTV Movie Awards	2017	Best Movie Performance	Logan	Nominated	
MTV Movie Awards	2017	Best Movie Duo (with Dafne Keen)	Logan	Won	
Nickelodeon Kids' Choice Award	2014	Favorite Male Butt Kicker	The Wolverine	Nominated	
Nickelodeon Kids' Choice Award	2015	Favorite Movie Actor	X-Men: Days of Future Past	Nominated	
Nickelodeon Kids' Choice Award	2015	Favorite Male Action Star	X-Men: Days of Future Past	Nominated	
People's Choice Awards	2010	Favorite Action Star	X-Men Origins: Wolverine	Won	
People's Choice Awards	2010	Favorite Movie Actor	X-Men Origins: Wolverine	Nominated	
People's Choice Awards	2010	Favorite On-Screen Team (with Daniel Henney, Dominic Monaghan, Liev Schreiber, Ryan Reynolds & will.i.am)	X-Men Origins: Wolverine	Nominated	
People's Choice Awards	2012	Favorite Action Movie Actor	Real Steel	Won	
People's Choice Awards	2012	Favorite Movie Actor	Real Steel	Nominated	
People's Choice Awards	2014	Favorite Movie Actor	Prisoners / The Wolverine	Nominated	
People's Choice Awards	2014	Favorite Dramatic Movie Actor	Prisoners	Nominated	
People's Choice Awards	2014	Favorite Action Movie Actor	The Wolverine	Nominated	
People's Choice Awards	2015	Favorite Movie Actor	X-Men: Days of Future Past	Won	
People's Choice Awards	2015	Favorite Action Movie Actor	X-Men: Days of Future Past	Won	
Razzie Award	2014	Worst Screen Combo	Movie 43	Nominated	
Saturn Award	2001	Best Actor in a Film	X-Men	Won	
Saturn Award	2007	Best Actor in a Film	The Fountain	Nominated	
Saturn Award	2013	Best Actor in a Film	Les Misérables	Nominated	
Saturn Award	2018	Best Actor in a Film	Logan	Nominated	
Saturn Award	2025	Best Supporting Actor in a Film	Deadpool & Wolverine	Won	
Slammy Awards	2014	Raw Guest Star of the Year	Hugh Jackman	Won	
Spike Video Game Awards	2009	Best Performance by a Human Male	X-Men: Origins – Wolverine	Won	

== Theatre awards ==
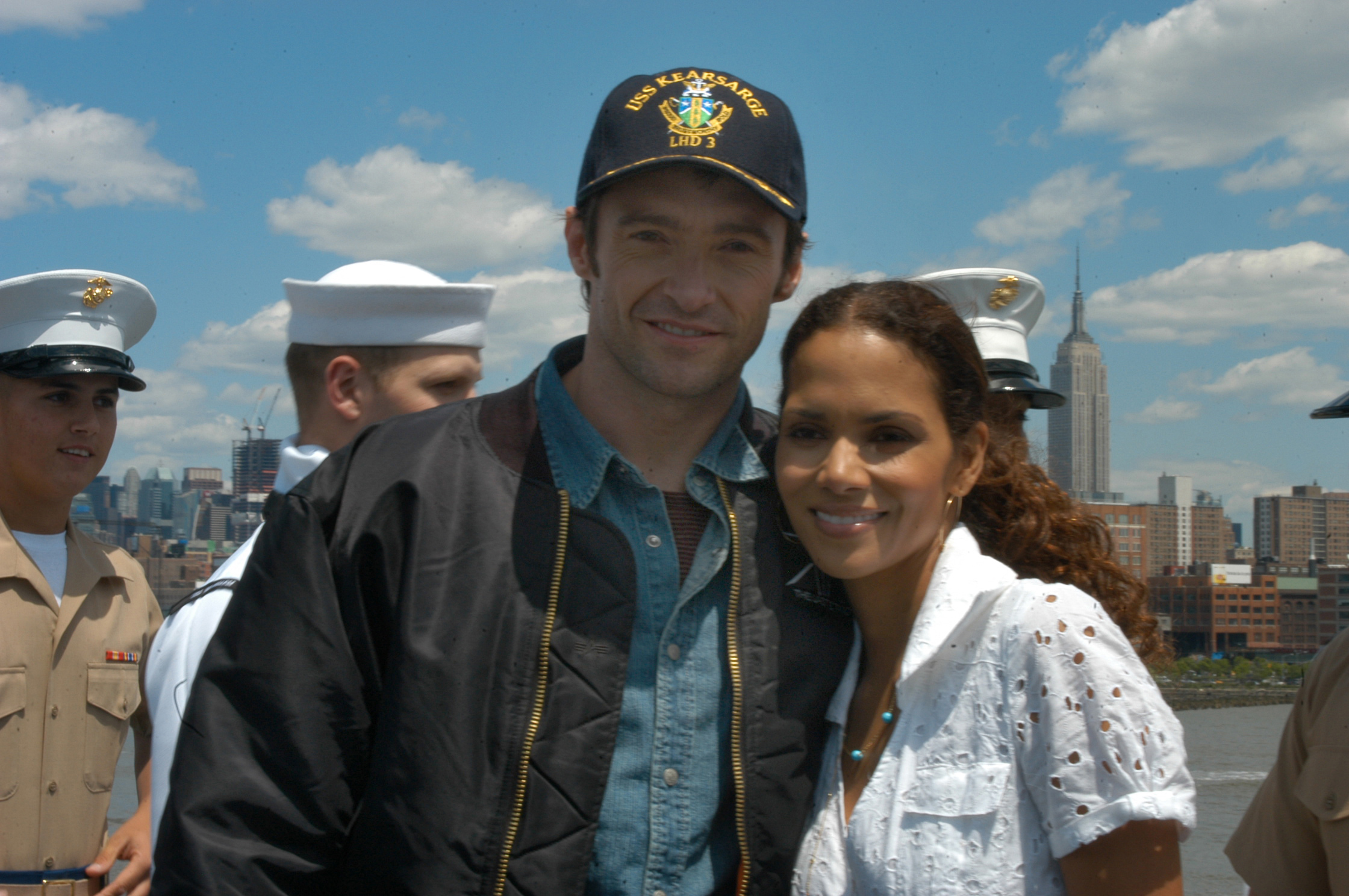
Jackman and Halle Berry visiting with sailors and Marines during the opening day of Fleet Week New York 2006

Organizations	Year	Category	Work	Result	Ref.
Astaire Awards	2012	Outstanding Male Dancer in a Broadway Show	Hugh Jackman, Back on Broadway	Nominated	
Chita Rivera Awards	2022	Outstanding Male Dancer in a Broadway Show	The Music Man	Nominated	
Drama Desk Award	2004	Outstanding Actor in a Musical	The Boy from Oz	Won	
Drama League Award	2004	Distinguished Performance	The Boy from Oz	Won	
Drama League Award	2022	Distinguished Achievement in Musical Theatre	Hugh Jackman	Won	
Drama League Award	2026	Distinguished Performance	Sexual Misconduct of the Middle Classes	Citation	
Helpmann Awards	2007	Best Male Actor in a Musical	The Boy from Oz	Nominated	
Theatre World Award	2004	Theatre World Award	The Boy from Oz	Won	
Outer Critics Circle Award	2004	Best Actor in a Musical	The Boy from Oz	Won	
Mo Awards	1996	Male Musical Theatre Performer of the Year	Beauty and the Beast	Won	
Mo Awards	1997	Male Musical Theatre Performer of the Year	Sunset Boulevard	Won	
Mo Awards	2003	Australian Showbusiness Ambassador	Hugh Jackman	Won	
Mo Awards	2004	Australian Showbusiness Ambassador	Hugh Jackman	Won	
Mo Awards	2006	Australian Performer of the Year	Hugh Jackman	Won	

== Honorary awards and citations ==
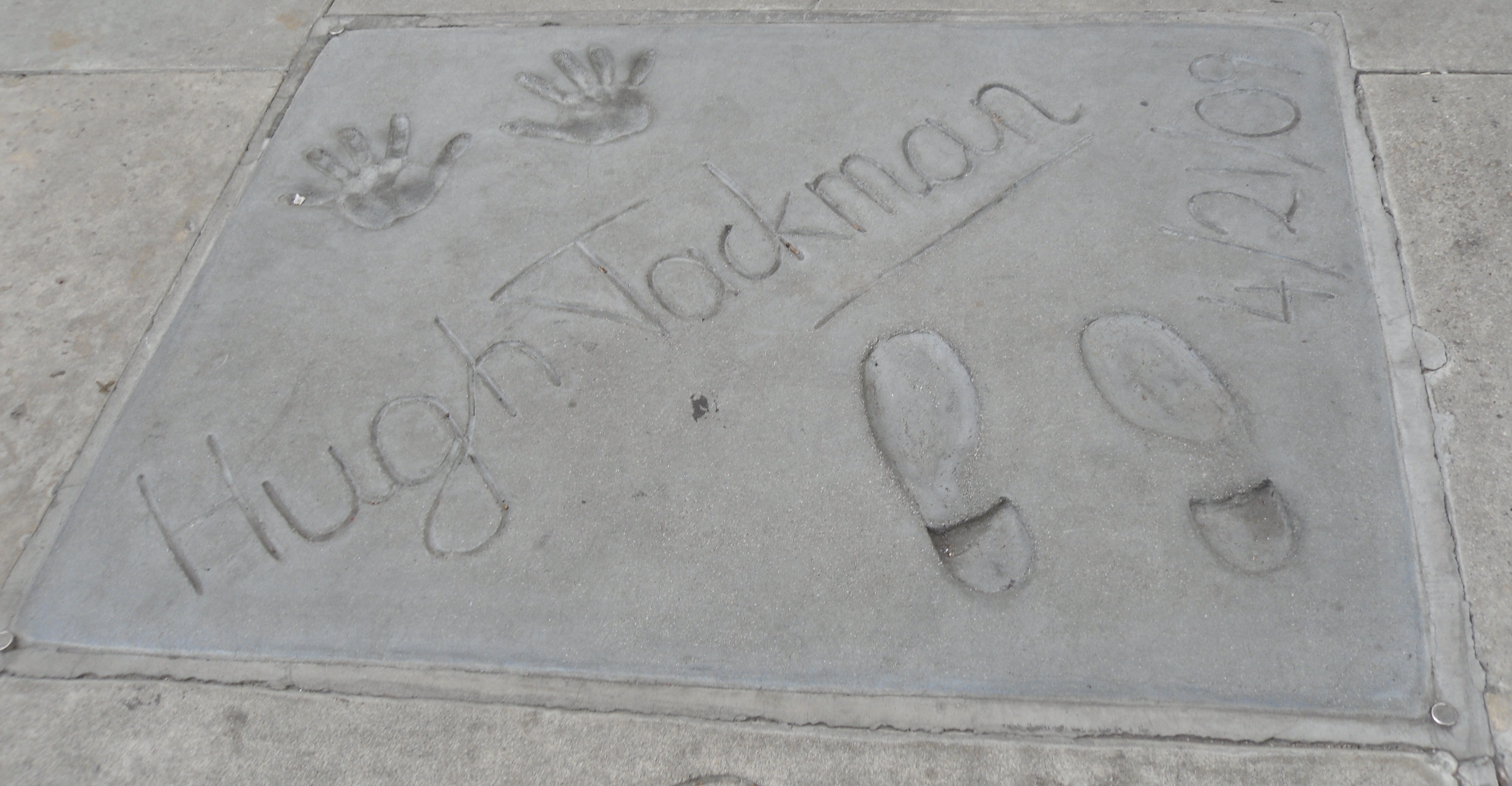
Jackman's signature at Grauman's Chinese Theatre

Organizations	Year	Award	Result	Ref.
People magazine	2008	"Sexiest Man Alive" title	Honored	
Grauman's Chinese Theatre	2009	Hand and Footprint ceremony	Honored	
Hollywood Walk of Fame	2012	Star on the Hollywood Walk of Fame	Honored	
Guinness World Record	2019	"Longest career as a live-action Marvel superhero" portraying Wolverine for 17 years	Honored	
Companion of the Order of Australia	2019	Medal, the highest of the four levels of the Order of Australia	Honored	
