= 2021 Governor General's Awards =

Canadian literary award

The shortlisted nominees for the 2021 Governor General's Awards for Literary Merit were announced on October 14, 2021, and the winners were announced on November 17. The 2021 awards returned to their traditional scheduling and presentation in the fall of the year, following the postponement of the 2020 Governor General's Awards to spring 2021 due to the COVID-19 pandemic in Canada.

== English ==
Category	Winner	Nominated
Fiction	Norma Dunning, Tainna	Rachel Cusk, Second Place; G. A. Grisenthwaite, Home Waltz; Joe Ollmann, Fictional Father; Sheung-King, You Are Eating an Orange. You Are Naked.
Non-fiction	Sadiqa de Meijer, alfabet/alphabet: a memoir of a first language	Larry Audlaluk, What I Remember, What I Know: The Life of a High Arctic Exile; Jenna Butler, Revery: A Year of Bees; Ivan Coyote, Care of: Letters, Connections, and Cures; J. B. MacKinnon, The Day the World Stops Shopping
Poetry	Tolu Oloruntoba, The Junta of Happenstance	Roxanna Bennett, The Untranslatable I; Stephen Collis, A History of the Theories of Rain; Hoa Nguyen, A Thousand Times You Lose Your Treasure; Rebecca Salazar, Sulphurtongue
Drama	Hannah Moscovitch, Sexual Misconduct of the Middle Classes	Falen Johnson, Two Indians; Jivesh Parasram, Take d Milk, Nah?; Paul David Power, Crippled; Christine Quintana, Selfie
Children's literature	Philippa Dowding, Firefly	Angela Ahn, Peter Lee's Notes from the Field; Sharon Jennings, Unravel; Liselle Sambury, Blood Like Magic; Basil Sylvester and Kevin Sylvester, The Fabulous Zed Watson!
Children's illustration	David A. Robertson and Julie Flett, On the Trapline	Paul Harbridge and Josée Bisaillon, Out Into the Big Wide Lake; Brittany Luby and Joshua Mangeshig Pawis-Steckley, Mii maanda ezhi-gkendmaanh / This Is How I Know; Bahram Rahman and Gabrielle Grimard, The Library Bus; Todd Stewart, The Wind and the Trees
French to English translation	Erín Moure, This Radiant Life (Chantal Neveu, La vie radieuse)	Helge Dascher and Rob Aspinall, Paul at Home (Michel Rabagliati, Paul à la maison); Peter Feldstein, People, State, and War Under the French Regime in Canada (Louise Dechêne, Le Peuple, lʼÉtat et la Guerre au Canada sous le Régime français); Katia Grubisic, A Cemetery for Bees (Alina Dumitrescu, Le cimetière des abeilles); Susan Ouriou, The Lover, the Lake (Virginia Pésémapéo Bordeleau, L'amant du lac)

== French ==
Category	Winner	Nominated
Fiction	Fanny Britt, Faire les sucres	Sébastien Chabot, Noir métal; Paul Serge Forest, Tout est ori; Sylvie Laliberté, Jʼai montré toutes mes pattes blanches je nʼen ai plus; Olivia Tapiero, Rien du tout
Non-fiction	Serge Bouchard and Mark Fortier, Du diesel dans les veines	Mathieu Bélisle, LʼEmpire invisible; Isabelle Daunais, La Vie au long cours; Esther Laforce, Occuper les distances; Robert Lalonde, La Reconstruction du paradis
Poetry	Tania Langlais, Pendant que Perceval tombait	Daria Colonna, La voleuse; Chloé LaDuchesse, Exosquelette; Louise Marois, Dʼune caresse patentée; Patrick Roy, Pompéi
Drama	Mishka Lavigne, Copeaux	Rébecca Déraspe, Combattre le why-why; Emma Haché, Johnny; Jean-Philippe Lehoux, Bande de bouffons; Émilie Monnet, Okinum
Children's literature	Jean-François Sénéchal, Les Avenues	Jonathan Bécotte, Comme un ouragan; Mario Fecteau, Le Dernier Viking; Sandra Sirois, Stella, qu'est-ce que tu fais là?; Frédérick Wolfe, Tara voulait jouer
Children's illustration	Mario Brassard and Gérard DuBois, À qui appartiennent les nuages ?	Jacques Goldstyn, Le Tricot; François Gravel and Laurent Pinabel, La langue au chat et autres poèmes pas bêtes; Catherine Lepage, Bouées : dérives identitaires, amours imaginaires et détours capillaires; Vigg, Ma maison-tête
English to French translation	Marie Frankland, Poèmes 1938-1984 (Elizabeth Smart, The Collected Poems)	Dominique Fortier, La ballade de Baby suivi de Sagesse de l'absurde (Heather O'Neill, Lullabies for Little Criminals and Wisdom in Nonsense); Daniel Grenier, La Course de Rose (Dawn Dumont, Rose's Run); Colette St-Hilaire, Toots fait la Shiva, avenue Minto (Erín Moure, Sitting Shiva on Minto Avenue, by Toots); Madeleine Stratford, Petits marronnages (Kaie Kellough, Dominoes at the Crossroads)
