= Alfabet/Alphabet =

2021 book by Sadiqa de Meijer

Alfabet/Alphabet: A Memoir of a First Language
- Author: Sadiqa de Meijer
- Language: English
- Genres: Memoir; Non-fiction
- Publisher: Palimpsest Press
- Publication date: October 1, 2020
- Publication place: Canada
- Media type: Print (paperback)
- Pages: 100
- Awards: Governor General’s Literary Award
- ISBN: 978-1989287606

Alfabet/Alphabet: A Memoir of a First Language is a book written by Canadian poet Sadiqa de Meijer. It is a collection of essays and a record of her transitioning from speaking Dutch to English. The book was published in October 2020 by Palimpsest Press of Windsor, Ontario, and won the 2021 Governor General's Literary Award for English-language non-fiction.

== Synopsis ==
de Meijer's alfabet/alphabet chronicles her transition from speaking Dutch, her mother tongue, to English, her adopted tongue. By taking an eclectic approach to narrative, she examines the shifting cultural currents of language by exploring topics of identity, geography, family, and translation. As a result, alfabet/alphabet identifies components of fellow linguistic migrants' experiences, while leaving lifelong English speakers with a different perspective of their mother tongue.

== Awards ==
alfabet/alphabet: a memoir of a first language, won the Governor General’s Literary Award for English-language non-fiction at the 2021 Governor General's Awards.

== Reception ==
alfabet/alphabet was generally well received. Cara Nelissen at the Literary Review of Canada comments, "de Meijer weaves little gems throughout alfabet/alphabet, including a four-page list of what English-speakers think Dutch sounds like". Joanne Booy-De Moor at The Banner writes, "This slim volume is academically rigorous and poetically playful as she explores questions of identity, landscape, and family".
