= The Junta of Happenstance =

Book by Tolu Oloruntoba

- Author: Tolu Oloruntoba
- Cover artist: Kate Hargreaves
- Language: English
- Genre: Poetry
- Publisher: Palimpsest Press
- Publication date: May 1, 2021
- Publication place: Canada
- Media type: Print (paperback)
- Pages: 80
- Award: Governor General's Literary Award
- ISBN: 978-1989287729

The Junta of Happenstance is a book written by Nigerian-Canadian poet and physician Tolu Olonuntoba from British Columbia, Canada. It is a debut collection of poetry published in May 2021 by Palimpsest Press of Windsor, Ontario. The book is the winner of the 2021 Governor General's Literary Award for English-language poetry.

== Backstory ==
Olonuntoba originally wrote The Junta of Happenstance as a trilogy of thematically linked chapbooks. Since he completed about twenty to twenty-five poems over a three-year period, he realized that it would be less of a daunting task if he concentrated his efforts on each of the three sections individually, instead of trying to write an entire book all at once.

== Synopsis ==
The Junta of Happenstance is Olonuntoba's poetic debut and is a compendium of dis-ease. It encompasses disease in the traditional sense, as informed by his experiences as a physician, as well as dis-ease, used as a primer for familial dysfunction, (im)migrant experience, and urban / corporate unease. With awareness and insight, Olonuntoba is able to make sense of a current situation by finding beauty in turmoil, and strength in pain.

== Awards ==
The Junta of Happenstance won the Governor General's Literary Award for English-language poetry at the 2021 Governor General's Awards.

== Reception ==
The book was generally well received. Barb Carey, special correspondent to the Toronto Star notices “A sense of disquiet, conveyed in images that are expressive and at times surreal, haunts much of Tolu Oloruntoba's debut collection..." At the Miramichi Reader, Dominique Béchard writes, "The Junta of Happenstance is an impressive debut", and adds, "It has many qualities I find admirable in a first collection: passion, a large number of poems, and a certain playfulness (of music and tone) that relays poetic confidence." David Ly, who interviewed Oloruntoba for the magazine Prism International, calls the book at Goodreads, "An excellent debut, and finalist for the Governor General Literary Awards!"
