= Tolu Oloruntoba =

Nigerian-Canadian poet and physician

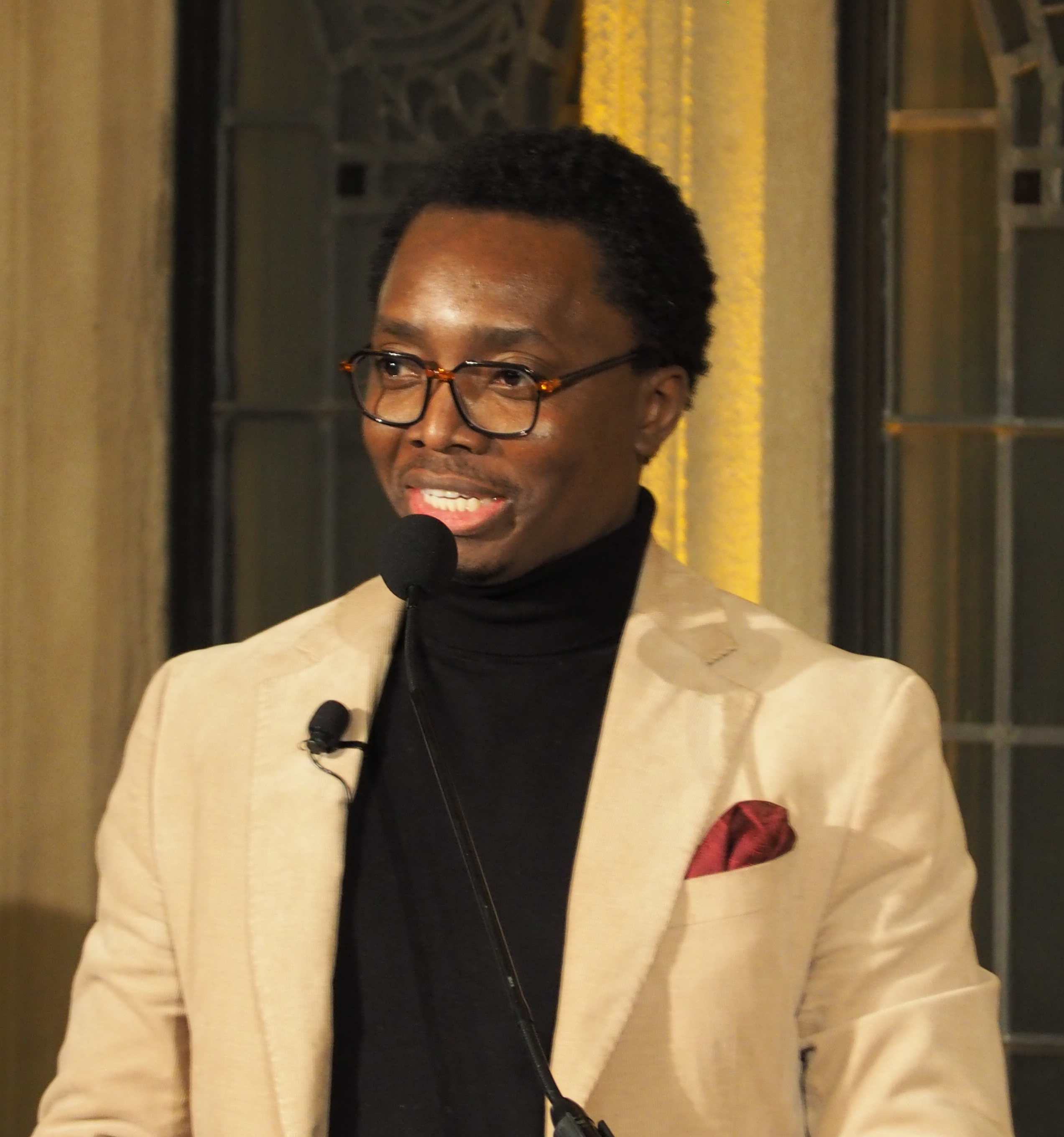
- Tolu Oloruntoba
- Born: Ibadan, Oyo State, Nigeria
- Occupations: poet, physician

Tolu Oloruntoba is a Nigerian-Canadian poet, physician, and public health professional. He is best known for his debut poetry collection, The Junta of Happenstance, which won the Governor General's Award for English-language poetry at the 2021 Governor General's Awards and the Griffin Poetry Prize in 2022.

Born in Ibadan, Oyo State, Nigeria, Oloruntoba trained as a physician before emigrating to Canada. He later transitioned into healthcare leadership and has worked in British Columbia as a manager of virtual health projects.

His writing explores themes including migration, identity, memory, illness, family, colonialism, and belonging. His poems have appeared in numerous literary journals in Canada and internationally.

== Career ==
Oloruntoba's first chapbook, Manubrium, was shortlisted for the bpNichol Chapbook Award in 2020.

His debut full-length poetry collection, The Junta of Happenstance, was published by Palimpsest Press in 2021. The collection received widespread critical acclaim and won the Governor General's Award for English-language poetry and the Griffin Poetry Prize, becoming one of the most celebrated Canadian poetry collections of the year.

His second poetry collection, Each One a Furnace, was published in 2022 and was shortlisted for several Canadian literary awards.

== Works ==
- Manubrium (chapbook, 2020)
- The Junta of Happenstance (2021)
- Each One a Furnace (2022)

== Awards and honours ==
- Shortlisted for the bpNichol Chapbook Award (2020)
- Governor General's Award for English-language poetry (2021)
- Griffin Poetry Prize (2022)

== See also ==
- List of Nigerian writers
- Canadian poetry
