= Paul Power (disambiguation) =

Paul Power (born 1953) is an English footballer.

Paul Power may also refer to:

- Paul David Power, Canadian actor, playwright and theatre director
- Paul Power, CEO of Refugee Council of Australia
- Paul Power (hurler) on Waterford U21 Hurling Team 1992
- Paul Power (actor) in Under California Stars
