= Sébastien Chabot =

Canadian writer

Sébastien Chabot (born 1976 in Sainte-Florence, Quebec) is a Canadian writer, whose novel Noir métal was a shortlisted finalist for the Governor General's Award for French-language fiction at the 2021 Governor General's Awards.

Educated at the Université du Québec à Rimouski and the Université du Québec à Montréal, Chabot published his debut novel Ma mère est une marmotte in 2004. He followed up in 2006 with L'Angoisse des poulets sans plumes, which won the Prix Jovette-Bernier.

He subsequently published Le Chant des mouches in 2007, and L'Empereur en culottes courtes in 2013.
