= Hugh Jackman: in Performance =

2011 concert in San Francisco, US

- Concert by Hugh Jackman
- Still
- Venue: Curran Theatre (San Francisco, California)
- Date: 3 May 2011 – 15 May 2011

Hugh Jackman: in Performance is a music concert by Australian actor, musician, and dancer Hugh Jackman. Jackman performs his favourite Broadway and Hollywood musical numbers, supported by a 17-piece orchestra.

The show was directed by Warren Carlyle.

== Setlist ==
1. Oh, What a Beautiful Mornin'
2. One Night Only
3. I Won't Dance
4. A Crazy Little Thing Called Love / A Little Less Conversation
5. L.O.V.E
6. The Way You Look Tonight
7. Soliloquy
8. Fever
9. Rock Island
10. Take Me or Leave Me
11. The Boy Next Door
12. Peter Allen Medley
13. Tenterfield Saddler
14. Movie Medley
15. Over the Rainbow
16. Mack the Knife
17. Once Before I Go

== Reviews ==
"It’s not just that they don’t make ’em like Hugh Jackman anymore – they never did […] What makes it irresistible is Jackman’s charm, which was most evident in his ad libs, which never crossed the line of becoming glib, and in his ability to roll with the punches, from split pants to handcuffs and even an audience member who shouted out her phone number. No matter what was happening onstage, what launched the audience to its collective feet at the end was simply Hugh and the night and music." — San Francisco Chronicle

"Jackman gamely hustled his way through almost two hours of classic show tunes, power ballads and chorus-girl-worthy hoofing. If the Hollywood gigs ever dry up, the A-list hottie can definitely fall back on his cabaret chops. While the world premiere of this one-man show may not have been flawless, it was quite a hoot to spend the evening in the hands of a master showman." — The Mercury News

"Hugh Jackman may not be a Grammy Award-winning recording artist or Astaire Award-winning dancer, but the Tony Award-winning stage and film star has something else: tons of charisma and an unerring sense of showmanship. Those qualities help make his concert, Hugh Jackman in Concert, now at San Francisco’s Curran Theatre, a don’t-miss, feel-good evening of energetic entertainment." — Theatre Mania
