= Rebecca Salazar =

Canadian poet

Rebecca Salazar is a Canadian poet, whose poetry collection sulphurtongue was shortlisted for the Governor General's Award for English-language poetry at the 2021 Governor General's Awards. Her collection antibody is a finalist for the 2026 Lambda Literary Award for Bisexual Literature.

Originally from Sudbury, Ontario, Salazar is currently based in Fredericton, New Brunswick, where she is a doctoral student at the University of New Brunswick. She previously published the collections Guzzle (2016) and the knife you need to justify the wound (2018). Her latest collection, sulphurtongue (2021) was final-listed for the 2021 Governor General’s Award for Poetry.
