= Hugh Jackman: in Concert =

2011 concert in Toronto, Canada

- Concert by Hugh Jackman
- Still
- Venue: Princess of Wales Theatre (Toronto, Ontario, Canada)
- Date: 5 July 2011 – 17 July 2011

Hugh Jackman: in Concert is a music concert by Australian actor, musician, and dancer Hugh Jackman.

Jackman performed Broadway and Hollywood musical numbers, backed by a 17-piece orchestra and directed by Warren Carlyle.

== Setlist ==
1. "Oh, What a Beautiful Mornin'"
2. "One Night Only"
3. "I Won’t Dance"
4. "Crazy Little Thing Called Love / A Little Less Conversation"
5. "L.O.V.E."
6. "The Way You Look Tonight"
7. "Soliloquy"
8. "Fever"
9. "Rock Island"
10. "Take Me or Leave Me [Merle & Angel]"
11. "The Boy Next Door"
12. "Peter Allen Medley"
13. "Tenterfield Saddler"
14. "Movie Medley"
15. "Somewhere Over the Rainbow"
16. "Mack the Knife"
17. "Once Before I Go"

== Reviews ==
"... at every turn, Jackman seems to make it abundantly clear that in this moment — whether he’s riffing on the golden days of the movie musical, or feeling his way through a deeply memorable rendition of Carousel’s ‘Soliloquy,’ or reprising lesser-known Allen songs such as ‘Tenterfield Saddler’ or ‘Once Before I Go’ — there is nowhere else he would rather be. And no one else for whom he would rather be doing it. In the face of such open-hearted generosity, there’s probably not a single person in his audience who doesn’t know exactly how he feels." — CANOE

"Hugh Jackman in Concert doesn’t feel like a career move – it feels like fun, the work of a talented performer unexpectedly given the chance to do what he loves just for the hell of it. But where another star might have let that opportunity sour into a statement of ego, Jackman lets the audience share in his passion and his fun. It’s hard to imagine him ever having a better role." — THE GLOBE AND MAIL
