= Sadiqa de Meijer =

Canadian poet and writer

- Occupations: poet, short story writer
- Writing career
- Period: 2010s-present
- Notable work: Leaving Howe Island

Sadiqa de Meijer is a Canadian poet. Her debut collection, Leaving Howe Island, was a nominee for the Governor General's Award for English-language poetry at the 2014 Governor General's Awards and for the 2014 Pat Lowther Award, and her poem "Great Aunt Unmarried" won the CBC's Canada Writes award for poetry in 2012.

She has also published short stories and essays in anthologies and literary magazines, and won the Governor General's Award for English-language non-fiction at the 2021 Governor General's Awards for her book alfabet/alphabet: a memoir of a first language.

In 2022, she was selected to be the Poet Laureate of Kingston, Ontario for a term of four years.

Born in Amsterdam, Netherlands and raised in Canada, she currently resides in Kingston, Ontario.
