= Aislinn Hunter =

Canadian writer

- Born: 1969 (age 56–57); Belleville, Ontario
- Education: University of Victoria; University of British Columbia
- Occupations: Professor, writer
- Website: aislinnhunter.com

Aislinn Hunter (born 1969 in Belleville, Ontario) is a Canadian poetry and fiction author.

== Early life ==
She studied art history and writing at the University of Victoria where she received her Bachelor of Fine Arts degree. Her Master of Fine Arts degree came from the University of British Columbia, her MSc in Writing and Cultural Politics came from the University of Edinburgh as did her PhD where she wrote on writers' houses/museums and resonant things with a focus on the Victorian era and thing theory via Heidegger. She currently teaches Creative Writing part-time at Kwantlen Polytechnic University. Hunter's research interests include material culture, museums, books-as-things, Victorian writers, and ephemera.

== Career ==
Her 2002 novel Stay was adapted for film by Wiebke Von Carolsfeld and released as a Telefilm / Irish Film Board co-production in 2013, premiering at the Toronto International Film Festival. It stars Aidan Quinn and Taylor Schilling. Her novel, The World Before Us, set in a UK museum, was published by Doubleday, Canada in 2014 and by Hamish Hamilton in the UK, Hogarth Press in the US, and Marchand de Feuilles in Quebec. It won the 2015 Ethel Wilson Fiction Prize and was a New York Times Editor's Choice Book, an NPR 'Best Book' and a Chatelaine Book Club pick.

In the spring of 2017 her third book of poetry, Linger, Still, was published by Gaspereau Press. It won the Fred Cogswell Award for Excellence in Poetry and was long-listed for the Pat Lowther Poetry Prize.

Dr Hunter was selected to be a Canadian War Artist and in 2018 she worked with the Canadian Armed Forces and with NATO Forces at CFB Suffield.

Her most recent novel The Certainties was released in 2020 and published by Knopf Canada. It was shortlisted for the Ethel Wilson Fiction prize and was a best-seller.

== Personal life ==
She was married for 25 years but lost her husband to brain cancer in 2018. She lives in Vancouver, British Columbia with her partner Tait and step-son Freddy.

== Bibliography ==
=== Fiction ===
- 2001: What's Left Us. Vancouver: Polestar. 27 December 2023. ISBN 9781551924120.
  - French translation by Carole Noël: Ce qu'il nous reste. Toronto: Les Allusifs. 27 December 2023. ISBN 9782922868173.
- 2002: Stay. Vancouver: Polestar. 27 December 2023. ISBN 9781551925684.
- 2014: The World Before Us. Toronto: Doubleday. 31 March 2015. ISBN 9780385680660.
- 2020: The Certainties. Toronto: Knopf Canada. 27 December 2023. ISBN 9780735276871.

=== Poetry ===
- 2001: Into the Early Hours. Vancouver: Polestar. 27 December 2023. ISBN 9781551924984.
- 2004: The Possible Past. Vancouver: Polestar. 27 December 2023. ISBN 9781551927213.
- 2017: Linger, Still. Kentville: Gaspereau Press. 27 December 2023. ISBN 9781554471706.

=== Essay collection ===
- 2009: A Peepshow with Views of the Interior. Kingsville: Palimpsest Press. 27 December 2023. ISBN 9780978491765.

== Awards and recognition ==
Year	Work	Award	Category	Result	Ref
1996	—	Journey Prize	Poetry	Nominated	
1996	—	National Book Award	Fiction	Nominated	
2000	—	National Magazine Award	—	Nominated	
2002	Into the Early Hours	Gerald Lampert Award	—	Won	
2002	Into the Early Hours	Dorothy Livesay Poetry Prize	—	Finalist	
2002	What's Left Us	Danuta Gleed Literary Award	—	Shortlisted	
2002	What's Left Us	ReLit Award	Fiction	Shortlisted	
2003	Stay	Amazon Canada First Novel Award	—	Finalist	
2004	The Possible Past	Dorothy Livesay Poetry Prize	—	Shortlisted	
2004	The Possible Past	Pat Lowther Award	—	Shortlisted	
2004	The Possible Past	ReLit Award	Poetry	Shortlisted	
2015	The World Before Us	Ethel Wilson Fiction Prize	—	Won	
2017	Linger, Still	Fred Cogswell Award for Excellence in Poetry	—	Won	
2018	Linger, Still	Pat Lowther Award	—	Longlisted	
