= Garden of Fools =

Book by Robert Hutchison

- Author: Robert Hutchison
- Genre: Historical Fiction
- Publisher: Palimpsest Publishing House
- Publication place: India
- Media type: Print (hardcover), Kindle
- Pages: 432
- ISBN: 978-81-9222661-3

Garden of Fools is a 2012 book by Robert Hutchison published by Palimpsest Publishing House in New Delhi. The book is a fictional account of the construction of the sacred Ganga Canal under the guidance of an engineer of the East India Company, Proby Caudey. It throws light on the social and administrative structure in India during the Raj. The author has described his book as "essentially a work of historical fiction based upon fact."
