= Humanitix =

Australian not-for-profit event ticketing organization

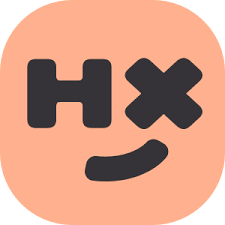
- Type: Public Benevolent Institution / 501(c)(3)
- Industry: Event ticketing, Social enterprise
- Founded: 2016
- Founders: Joshua Ross; Adam McCurdie
- Headquarters: Sydney, Australia
- Number of locations: 3 (2024)
- Area served: Australia, New Zealand, United States, United Kingdom, Canada
- Key people: Hugh Jackman (Head of Impact)
- Website: humanitix.com

Humanitix is an Australian not-for-profit organization that operates an online event ticketing platform. It is notable for directing 100% of profits derived from booking fees to charitable causes, with a primary focus on education programs for disadvantaged children. As of 2026, Humanitix has donated over $13.8 million to charity since its founding in 2016.

Humanitix operates physically in Australia, New Zealand, the United States, and the United Kingdom. It is headquartered in Sydney and maintains offices in Auckland, Denver, and Edinburgh.

In Australia, Humanitix is registered as a Public Benevolent Institution with the Australian Charities and Not-for-profits Commission (ACNC) since 17 April 2017. It operates as a 501(c)(3) non-profit in the United States and as a charitable trust in New Zealand.

== Overview ==
Similar to commercial ticketing platforms, Humanitix charges booking fees on ticket sales processed through its system. Humanitix reinvests 100% of the net profits from those fees into charitable programs, primarily targeting education and disadvantaged youth.

The platform serves event organizers ranging from small community events and school fundraisers to large conferences and festivals. Humanitix has publicly stated that its fee structure is competitive with or lower than comparable commercial platforms, offering standard organizers fees of 5% plus a flat per-ticket charge inclusive of payment processing, with reduced rates available for registered non-profits and schools.

We want people to feel good about the boring part of buying a ticket.

— Adam McCurdie, co-founder, The Sydney Morning Herald, 2019

== Mission and charitable model ==
Humanitix offers an alternative ticketing model by providing a portion of booking fee profits to charities.

Humanitix's charitable donations have historically focused on programs supporting children's access to education in under-resourced communities. Partner organizations and programs have included initiatives in Australia, New Zealand, United States, the UK and internationally. The organization publishes cumulative donation totals and periodically reports on the programs supported.

As of 2024, the total amount donated since founding has surpassed $13.8 million. Humanitix has been backed by Google.org, the philanthropic arm of Google, which awarded Humanitix first place in the 2018 Google Impact Challenge in Australia, with a prize of $1 million.

== History ==
=== Founding ===
Humanitix was founded in 2016 by Joshua Ross, a former hedge fund manager, and Adam McCurdie, a former management consultant. Both founders had backgrounds in finance and consulting before pivoting to build the organization in Sydney.

The founders identified the event ticketing industry as a sector where high booking fees generated substantial profits for commercial operators, but offered no corresponding social benefit. Their thesis was that a well-run ticketing platform could be operationally self-sustaining while channeling its profits to charities rather than private shareholders.

=== Growth and expansion ===
Following its launch in Australia, Humanitix expanded to New Zealand, where it received support from the NEXT Foundation, a New Zealand philanthropic organization. The platform subsequently expanded to the United States, and the United Kingdom.

In 2018, Humanitix received a $1 million grant from Google.org through the Google Impact Challenge, and a $1.2 million grant from the Atlassian Foundation, the charitable arm of Australian enterprise software company Atlassian.

The organization's growth accelerated through the 2020s as its platform expanded to support a broader range of event types, including conferences, community festivals, school events, and nonprofit fundraisers. The platform's integration of event management and fundraising tools has been cited as a factor in its adoption by the nonprofit and education sectors.

In 2026, Hugh Jackman joined Humanitix as Head of Impact.

== Platform and products ==
The Humanitix platform provides event organizers with tools for ticket sales, event page creation, attendee management, and on-the-door check-in. A companion mobile application allows event staff to scan and validate tickets and process sales at the door.

The platform is accessible via web and mobile, and supports both free and paid events. For paid ticket sales, Humanitix charges a percentage-based booking fee plus a flat per-ticket amount, inclusive of payment processing costs. As of 2024 in the United States, the standard rate is 5% plus $1.29 per paid ticket. Registered non-profit organizations and schools are eligible for a reduced rate of 3.9% plus $1.29 per paid ticket.

== Funding and recognition ==
Humanitix has received philanthropic and institutional backing from several prominent organizations:

Year	Organization	Award / Grant	Amount
2018	Google.org	Google Impact Challenge (1st place)	$1 million
2018	Atlassian Foundation	Philanthropic grant	$1.2 million
2018	Westpac	Top 20 Businesses of Tomorrow	—
2018	Third Sector Awards	Social Entrepreneurs of the Year	—
Ongoing	NEXT Foundation (NZ)	Operational support	Undisclosed

== Legal structure ==
Humanitix operates under different legal frameworks in each of its jurisdictions of operation. In Australia, it is registered as a Public Benevolent Institution with the Australian Charities and Not-for-profits Commission (ACNC), having been registered since 17 April 2017.

In the United States, Humanitix USA Limited operates as a 501(c)(3) non-profit organization, as verified by Charity Navigator (EIN: 36-4956766). In New Zealand, the organization operates as a charitable trust.

The multi-jurisdictional charitable structure enables Humanitix to accept tax-deductible donations and operate under favorable regulatory conditions in each market, while maintaining a consistent mission across geographies.

== Academic research ==
Humanitix has been the subject of academic research into ethical business models and social enterprise. The University of New South Wales (UNSW) Business School has studied Humanitix as part of its research into digital enablement and social listening, through a project designated the "Humanitix Social Listening Sandbox."

The organization has been cited in discussions of alternative business models in the ticketing and events industry.
