= Tainna =

Book by Norma Dunning

- The Unseen Ones, Short Stories
- Author: Norma Dunning
- Language: English
- Genre: Fiction
- Published: 2021
- Publisher: Douglas & McIntyre
- Publication place: Canada
- Media type: Print (paperback), digital (eBook)
- Pages: 160
- Award: Governor General’s Literary Award
- ISBN: 9781771622714

Tainna:The Unseen Ones is a book written by Inuk Canadian writer Norma Dunning. It is a collection of six short stories based on the tales and experiences of modern day Inuit characters living outside their home territories in Southern Canada. Published in 2021 by the independent publisher Douglas & McIntyre of Vancouver, British Columbia, the book won the 2021 Governor General's Literary Award for English-language fiction.

== Backstory ==
Dunning wrote Tainna while working on her PhD dissertation at the University of Victoria in British Columbia. The collection of six short stories, is a compilation of those experiences and of tales that centre on modern-day Inuit living in regions of Southern Canada, areas of the country that are outside traditional Inuit home territories.

In Tainna, the meaning of the word is “the unseen ones” and is pronounced Da‑e‑nn‑a.

== Synopsis ==
Written by drawing from her life experiences and cultural memory, Dunning compiled a collection of six short stories based on modern-day Inuk characters that contrast each other remarkably well. They span from the homeless to the wealthy, from the spiritual to the cynical, from the young to the elderly, and from the living to the dead. Sentiments of alienation, displacement, and loneliness, as well as boredom from their experiences away from home, are what binds them together.

== Awards ==
Tainna: The Unseen Ones, Short Stories, won the Governor General's Award for English-language fiction at the 2021 Governor General's Awards, and was shortlisted for the ReLit Award for short fiction in 2022.

== Reception ==
Tainna was generally well received in Canada. Robert J. Wiersema at the Canadian magazine Quill & Quire writes, "Tainna is less a collection of stories than it is the parts of a world, fragile and broken but powerful and dazzling all the same." Ciana Hamilton at the Canadian quarterly literary journal Room Magazine publishes, "The characters may be fabricated but the stories are undoubtedly ones of many truths. Tainna will break your heart, mend it, and break it again." Sean Wilson, artistic director for the Ottawa International Writers Festival, broadcasts on CTV News in Ottawa, "We so rarely hear Inuit voices and to have this contemporary collection that looks at life today for Northerners living in the south is a gift." He tells viewers that Dunning's book is "funny, fierce, intimate and entirely enthralling".
