= Norma Dunning =

Canadian writer

- Born: 1959 (age 66–67); Quebec, Canada
- Education: University of Alberta (PhD)
- Occupations: Writer, lecturer
- Writing career
- Genres: Short story, poetry, non-fiction
- Notable works: Annie Muktuk and Other Stories (2017); Tainna: The Unseen Ones (2021); Kinauvit?: What's Your Name? (2022)
- Notable awards: Danuta Gleed Literary Award (2017); Howard O'Hagan Award for Short Story (2018); Governor General's Award for English-language fiction (2021)

Norma Dunning (born 1959) is an Inuk Canadian writer and assistant lecturer at the University of Alberta.

== Early life ==
Of Inuit descent through her mother, Dunning was born in Quebec and raised in a variety of towns as her father was a member of the Canadian military. She is based in Edmonton, Alberta, where she completed her doctoral degree with Indigenous Peoples Education at the University of Alberta in June 2019.

== Career ==
Dunning has taught at the University of Alberta, NorQuest College, and Red Deer Polytechnic. In August 2023, she joined the First Nations University of Canada as an assistant professor in Indigenous Health. She teaches and coordinates the Indigenous Studies program there.

== Works ==
=== Fiction ===
- Naoyak (2026)

=== Short story collections ===
- Annie Muktuk and Other Stories (2017)
- Tainna: The Unseen Ones (2021)

=== Poetry ===
- Eskimo Pie: A Poetics of Inuit Identity (2020)
- Akia: The Other Side (2022)

=== Non-fiction ===
- Kinauvit?: What's Your Name? The Eskimo Disc System and a Daughter's Search for Her Grandmother (2022)

== Awards and honours ==
=== Wins ===
- 2018: Danuta Gleed Literary Award for Annie Muktuk and Other Stories. The 2017 award was presented in 2018.
- 2018: Howard O'Hagan Award for Short Story from the Writers' Guild of Alberta for "Elipsee", a story in Annie Muktuk and Other Stories.
- 2021: Governor General's Award for English-language fiction for Tainna: The Unseen Ones.

=== Shortlists ===
- 2018: Robert Kroetsch City of Edmonton Book Prize for Annie Muktuk and Other Stories.
- 2022: ReLit Award for short fiction, for Tainna: The Unseen Ones.
- 2023: Shaughnessy Cohen Prize for Political Writing for Kinauvit?: What's Your Name? The Eskimo Disc System and a Daughter's Search for Her Grandmother.
