= Sandra Sirois =

Canadian journalist, TV & radio host

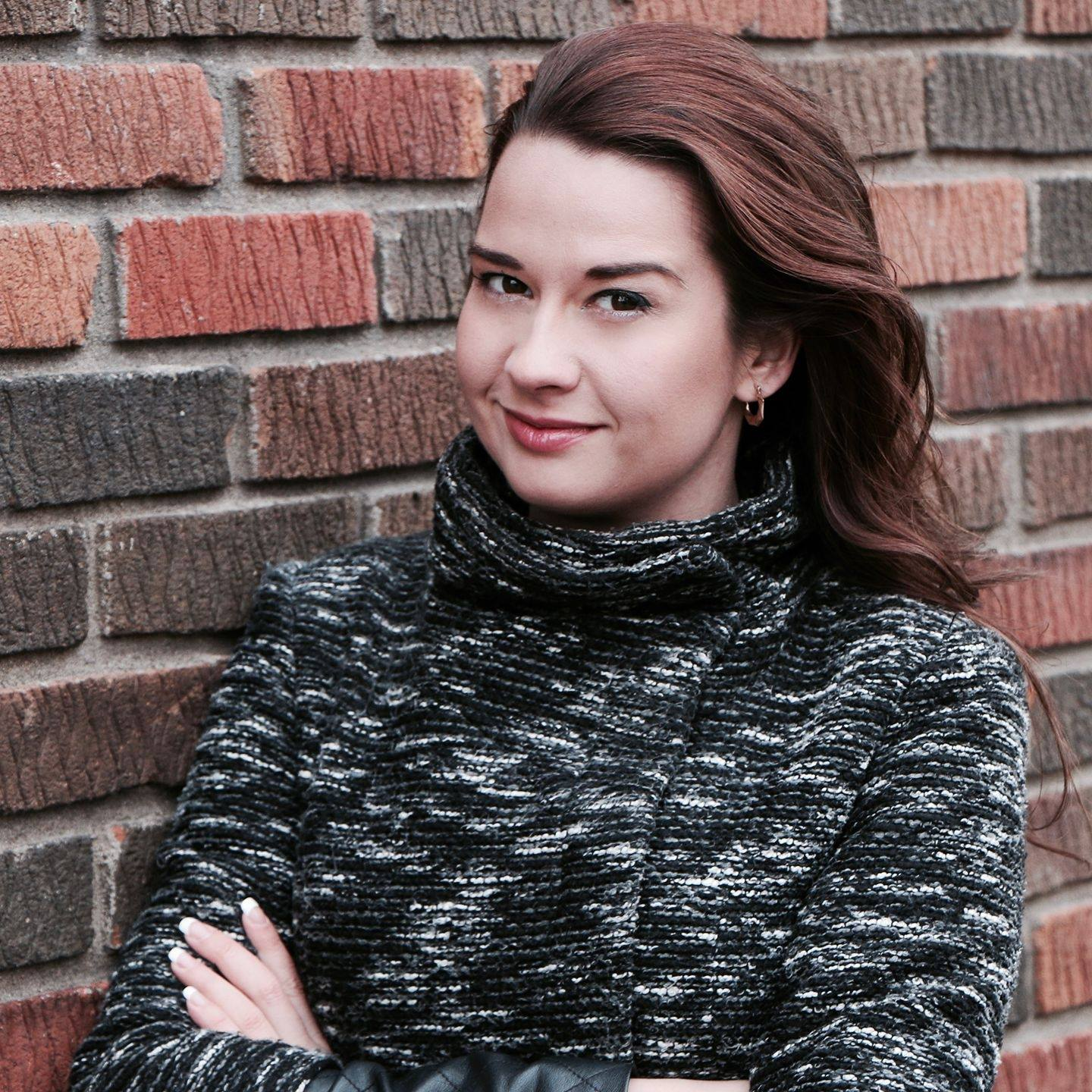
- Portrait of Sandra Sirois
- Born: Montreal, Quebec, Canada
- Status: Single
- Occupations: TV presenter, game show presenter
- Website: www.sandrasirois.com

Sandra Sirois is a Canadian TV and radio host, and an author.

== Background ==
Sirous was born in Montreal, Quebec and graduated from the University of Montreal in 2008. Between 2008 and 2011, she worked as a freelance writer for many French Canadian magazines and websites. During those years, Sandra Sirois also travelled around the world and visited more than 30 countries.

She has hosted various TV and radio shows in Quebec.

== Television ==
From 2011 until 2013, she hosted the game shows Call TV and l’Instant Gagnant on Quebec's TV channel V télé. In English, she hosted the TV show Game Time in 2012, which was broadcast on TLN Network. During the same year, she was also one of the main hosts of Quiz Zone, a game show aired on C TV, the national television network of the Republic of Trinidad-and-Tobago.

Between 2014 and 2015, Sandra Sirois was hosting the morning TV show À l'affiche, which is broadcast on ADR TV.

For several years, she has been hosting several TV shows on MAtv network in the province of Quebec. Between 2016 and 2019, she was a weather presenter at MétéoMédia and a news reporter for RDI.

In 2020, Sandra Sirois hosted a documentary series about the issues of period around the world in France. The series was broadcast in more than 50 countries around the world.

== Books ==
Sandra Sirois is the author of four novels:Sam perd la carte, in 2017 and Sam perd la tête, in 2019.
