= Paul David Power =

Canadian actor, playwright and theatre director

Paul David Power is a Canadian actor, playwright and theatre director from Newfoundland and Labrador, whose play Crippled was a nominee for the Governor General's Award for English-language drama at the 2021 Governor General's Awards.

Crippled, about a gay disabled man coping with grief following the death of his partner, was based in part on his own experiences following the death of his partner, Jonathan, in 2013. Power himself has a disability which requires him to use leg braces and crutches to walk.

The play was first produced for the stage in 2018, with Power performing the lead role himself, and was published by Breakwater Books in 2021. A planned production in San Francisco in 2019 was halted under complicated American rules which require foreign theatre artists to have their work bureaucratically judged as "culturally unique" before they can be granted a work permit. In 2022, the play was mounted at Theatre Passe Muraille in Toronto, with Power playing the lead role.

Power is the artistic director of his own theatre company, Power Productions, which specializes in stage plays about disability.

== Plays ==
Power's plays include:

- Crippled
- Roomies
- Last Chance
- The View from Down Here
- In Your Eyes
