= Sexual Misconduct of the Middle Classes =

Play by Hannah Moscovitch

- Original language: English
- Written by: Hannah Moscovitch
- Characters: Annie; Jon Macklem
- Subject: Teacher-student affair
- Genre: Comedy
- Setting: 2014

Premiere
- Date: January 8, 2020
- Place: Tarragon Theatre
- Directed by: Sarah Garton Stanley
- tarragontheatre.com

Sexual Misconduct of the Middle Classes is a 2020 play written by Canadian playwright Hannah Moscovitch. It is the winner of the 2021 Governor General's Literary Award for English-language drama. The play was published by Playwrights Canada Press in 2021.

== Premise ==
After his third divorce, a novelist and star lecturer is tortured with self-loathing when he notices himself liking a pupil — a girl in a red coat. The girl turns out to be a major fan of his work and who just so happens to live down the street from him.

== Dates, venues, and companies ==
Following a first reading in the United States, Sexual Misconduct of the Middle Classes has been performed for audiences in Canada and in Australia.

- 2017 - Seattle Repertory Theatre, Seattle, Washington (first reading)
- 2020 - Tarragon Theatre, Toronto, Ontario (premiere)
- 2021 - Southbank Theatre, The Sumner, Melbourne, Australia (Melbourne Theatre Company)
- 2025 and 2026 - Minetta Lane Theatre, New York City, New York

== Canadian crew ==
The play had its first reading in June 2017 at the Seattle Repertory Theatre in Seattle, Washington and had its world premiere at the Tarragon Theatre, in Toronto, Ontario, known for its development, creation and encouragement of new work in Canada.

=== Cast ===
- Annie: Alice Snaden
- Jon: Matthew Edison

=== Creative team ===
- Hannah Moscovitch – Playwright
- Sarah Garton Stanley – Director
- Eva Barrie – Assistant Director
- Michael Gianfrancesco – Set Designer
- Michael Gianfrancesco – Costume Designer
- Bonnie Beecher – Lighting Designer
- Hilary Pitman – Assistant Lighting Designer
- Julian Iacob – Assistant Lighting Designer
- Miquelon Rodriguez – Sound Designer
- Laura Warren – Video Designer
- Joanna Falck – Dramaturge
- Siobhan Richardson – Intimacy Coach

=== Production ===
- Daniel Oulton – Stage Manager
- Jaimee Hall – Apprentice Stage Manager
- Jahnelle Jones-Williams – Resident Student

=== Staff ===
- Gerry Egan – Production Manager
- John Thomson – Technical Director
- Kathleen Johnston – Head of Wardrobe
- Shaw Forgeron – Interim Head of Properties
- Andrew Chute - Scenic Carpenter

== Australian crew ==
=== Cast ===
- Annie: Izabella Yena
- Jon: Dan Spielman

=== Creative team ===
- Petra Kalive – Director
- Marg Horwell – Set and Costume Designer
- Rachel Burke – Lighting Designer
- Darius Kedros – Composer and Sound Designer
- Isabella Vadiveloo – Assistant Director
- Michala Banas – Intimacy Coordinator
- Xanthe Beesley – Movement Consultant

== Off Broadway Cast ==
=== Cast ===
- Annie: Ella Beatty (u/s Sophia Talwalkar)
- Jon: Hugh Jackman

==== Audible Recording ====
An audio-only recording of the play was made available on October 9th, 2025 on the audio book platform Audible performed by Hugh Jackman and Ella Beatty.

== Awards ==
Sexual Misconduct of the Middle Classes won the Governor General's Award for English-language drama at the 2021 Governor General's Awards.

== Reception ==
The play has generally been well received in both Canada and Australia. In Toronto, Joe Szekeres, chief critic for the Onstage Blog writes, "Canadian playwright Hannah Moscovitch viscerally overturned the #metoo movement on its head with a sizable goose egg bump at the premiere", and Carly Maga, theatre critic at the Toronto Star calls Moscovitch, "in control of her narrative, which she increasingly makes clear in her characterizations", claiming it to be "a powerful thing to witness." In Melbourne, Jane Mulkerrins at The Age adds the play explores "deftly subverting traditional tropes within the age-old story of a student-teacher affair".
