= 58th Tony Awards =

2004 US theatrical awards ceremony

- Official poster for the 58th annual Tony Awards
- Date: June 6, 2004
- Location: Radio City Music Hall, New York City, New York
- Hosted by: Hugh Jackman

Highlights
- Most wins: Assassins (5)
- Most nominations: Wicked (10)
- Website: tonyawards.com

Television/radio coverage
- Network: CBS
- Viewership: 6.4 million
- Produced by: Ricky Kirshner; Glenn Weiss
- Directed by: Glenn Weiss

The 58th Annual Tony Awards were held June 6, 2004 at Radio City Music Hall and broadcast on CBS television. Hugh Jackman was the host.

In 2005, the Tony Awards telecast won the Primetime Emmy Award for Outstanding Variety Special (Pre-Recorded), and Jackman won the Outstanding Individual Performance in a Variety or Music Program.

Wicked had the most nominations of the ceremony with 10, winning three of them, tying with Avenue Q, which won Best Musical, while the revival of Assassins won the most awards of the night with five, including Best Revival of a Musical.

== Eligibility ==
Shows that opened on Broadway during the 2003–04 season before May 6, 2004 are eligible.

Original plays

- Anna in the Tropics
- Bobbi Boland
- Drowning Crow
- Frozen
- Golda's Balcony
- I Am My Own Wife
- Match
- Oldest Living Confederate Widow Tells All
- Prymate
- The Retreat from Moscow
- Six Dance Lessons in Six Weeks
- Sixteen Wounded
- The Violet Hour

Original musicals

- Avenue Q
- Bombay Dreams
- The Boy from Oz
- Caroline, or Change
- Never Gonna Dance
- Taboo
- Wicked

Play revivals

- The Caretaker
- Cat on a Hot Tin Roof
- Henry IV (a combination of Part 1 and Part 2)
- Jumpers
- King Lear
- "Master Harold"...and the Boys
- A Raisin in the Sun
- Sly Fox
- Twentieth Century

Musical revivals

- Assassins
- Big River
- Fiddler on the Roof
- Little Shop of Horrors
- Wonderful Town

== The ceremony ==
Hugh Jackman performed the opening number, "One Night Only" with the "Dynamites" from Hairspray, the "Radio" from Caroline, or Change, and the "Urchins" from Little Shop of Horrors, along with members of the casts of Avenue Q, The Boy from Oz, Fiddler on the Roof, Wonderful Town, and Wicked, and the Radio City Music Hall Rockettes. Tony Bennett performed "Lullaby of Broadway" and Mary J. Blige sang "What I Did for Love" from the Tony Awards Songbook.

Presenters were: Carol Channing, Sean Combs, Taye Diggs, Edie Falco, Jimmy Fallon, Harvey Fierstein, Victor Garber, Joel Grey, Ethan Hawke, Anne Heche, Billy Joel, Scarlett Johansson, Nicole Kidman, Jane Krakowski, Peter Krause, Swoosie Kurtz, LL Cool J, Nathan Lane, Laura Linney, John Lithgow, Rob Marshall, Anne Meara, Brian Stokes Mitchell, Dame Helen Mirren, Sarah Jessica Parker, Anna Paquin, Bernadette Peters, Phylicia Rashad, Chita Rivera, John Rubenstein, Carole Bayer Sager, Martin Short, Patrick Stewart, Jerry Stiller, Sigourney Weaver, Marissa Jaret Winokur, and Renée Zellweger.

Shows that performed were:

New Musicals

- Avenue Q - The company performed "It Sucks to Be Me"
- The Boy from Oz - Hugh Jackman and members of the company performed "Not the Boy Next Door", with a special appearance by Sarah Jessica Parker
- Caroline, or Change - Tonya Pinkins performed "Lot's Wife"
- Wicked - Idina Menzel, Kristin Chenoweth and members of the company performed "Defying Gravity"

Revivals

- Assassins - Members of the company performed "Everybody's Got the Right"
- Fiddler on the Roof - Alfred Molina and company performed "Tradition"/"Bottle Dance"
- Wonderful Town - Donna Murphy and members of the company performed "Swing!"

== Winners and nominations ==
Winners are in bold

Best Play	Best Musical
**I Am My Own Wife – Doug Wright**; Anna in the Tropics – Nilo Cruz; Frozen – Bryony Lavery; The Retreat from Moscow – William Nicholson	**Avenue Q**; The Boy from Oz; Caroline, or Change; Wicked
Best Revival of a Play	Best Revival of a Musical
**Henry IV (a combination of Part 1 and Part 2)**; Jumpers; King Lear; A Raisin in the Sun	**Assassins**; Big River; Fiddler on the Roof; Wonderful Town
Best Performance by a Leading Actor in a Play	Best Performance by a Leading Actress in a Play
**Jefferson Mays – I Am My Own Wife as Charlotte von Mahlsdorf**; Kevin Kline – Henry IV (a combination of Part 1 and Part 2) as Sir John Falstaff; Simon Russell Beale – Jumpers as George; Christopher Plummer – King Lear as King Lear; Frank Langella – Match as Tobi	**Phylicia Rashad – A Raisin in the Sun as Lena Younger**; Swoosie Kurtz – Frozen as Nancy; Tovah Feldshuh – Golda's Balcony as Golda Meir; Eileen Atkins – The Retreat from Moscow as Alice; Anne Heche – Twentieth Century as Lily Garland/Mildred Plotka
Best Performance by a Leading Actor in a Musical	Best Performance by a Leading Actress in a Musical
**Hugh Jackman – The Boy from Oz as Peter Allen**; John Tartaglia – Avenue Q as Princeton/Rod; Alfred Molina – Fiddler on the Roof as Tevye; Hunter Foster – Little Shop of Horrors as Seymour Krelborn; Euan Morton – Taboo as George	**Idina Menzel – Wicked as Elphaba**; Stephanie D'Abruzzo – Avenue Q as Kate Monster/Lucy the Slut; Tonya Pinkins – Caroline, or Change as Caroline Thibodeaux; Kristin Chenoweth – Wicked as Galinda; Donna Murphy – Wonderful Town as Ruth Sherwood
Best Performance by a Featured Actor in a Play	Best Performance by a Featured Actress in a Play
**Brían F. O'Byrne – Frozen as Ralph**; Aidan Gillen – The Caretaker as Mick; Ben Chaplin – The Retreat from Moscow as Jamie; Omar Metwally – Sixteen Wounded as Mahmoud; Tom Aldredge – Twentieth Century as Matthew Clark	**Audra McDonald – A Raisin in the Sun as Ruth Younger**; Daphne Rubin-Vega – Anna in the Tropics as Conchita; Margo Martindale – Cat on a Hot Tin Roof as Big Mama; Essie Davis – Jumpers as Dotty; Sanaa Lathan – A Raisin in the Sun as Beneatha Younger
Best Performance by a Featured Actor in a Musical	Best Performance by a Featured Actress in a Musical
**Michael Cerveris – Assassins as John Wilkes Booth**; Denis O'Hare – Assassins as Charles Guiteau; Michael McElroy – Big River as Jim; John Cariani – Fiddler on the Roof as Motel the Tailor; Raul Esparza – Taboo as Philip Salon	**Anika Noni Rose – Caroline, or Change as Emmie Thibodeaux**; Beth Fowler – The Boy from Oz as Marion Woolnough; Isabel Keating – The Boy from Oz as Judy Garland; Karen Ziemba – Never Gonna Dance as Mabel Pritt; Jennifer Westfeldt – Wonderful Town as Eileen Sherwood
Best Book of a Musical	Best Original Score (Music and/or Lyrics) Written for the Theatre
**Jeff Whitty – Avenue Q**; Martin Sherman and Nick Enright – The Boy from Oz; Tony Kushner – Caroline, or Change; Winnie Holzman – Wicked	**Avenue Q – Robert Lopez and Jeff Marx (music and lyrics)**; Caroline, or Change – Jeanine Tesori (music) and Tony Kushner (lyrics); Taboo – Boy George (music and lyrics); Wicked – Stephen Schwartz (music and lyrics)
Best Scenic Design	Best Costume Design
**Eugene Lee – Wicked**; Robert Brill – Assassins; Tom Pye – Fiddler on the Roof; Ralph Funicello – Henry IV (a combination of Part 1 and Part 2)	**Susan Hilferty – Wicked**; Mark Thompson – Bombay Dreams; Jess Goldstein – Henry IV (a combination of Part 1 and Part 2); Mike Nicholls and Bobby Pearce – Taboo
Best Lighting Design	Best Orchestrations
**Jules Fisher and Peggy Eisenhauer – Assassins**; Brian MacDevitt – Fiddler on the Roof; Brian MacDevitt – Henry IV (a combination of Part 1 and Part 2); Kenneth Posner – Wicked	**Michael Starobin – Assassins**; Paul Bogaev – Bombay Dreams; Larry Hochman – Fiddler on the Roof; William David Brohn – Wicked
Best Direction of a Play	Best Direction of a Musical
**Jack O'Brien – Henry IV (a combination of Part 1 and Part 2)**; Doug Hughes – Frozen; Moises Kaufman – I Am My Own Wife; David Leveaux – Jumpers	**Joe Mantello – Assassins**; Jason Moore – Avenue Q; George C. Wolfe – Caroline, or Change; Kathleen Marshall – Wonderful Town
Best Choreography
**Kathleen Marshall – Wonderful Town**; Anthony Van Laast and Farah Khan – Bombay Dreams; Jerry Mitchell – Never Gonna Dance; Wayne Cilento – Wicked

== Special awards ==
Source: Playbill

- Regional Theatre Tony Award Winner - Cincinnati Playhouse in the Park
- Special Tony Award for Lifetime Achievement in the Theatre Winner - James M. Nederlander
- Tony Honors for Excellence in Theatre Winners
  - The cast of the 2003 Broadway production of Big River
  - Nancy Coyne
  - Frances & Harry Edelstein and Vincent Sardi, Jr.
  - Martha Swope

== Multiple nominations and awards ==
These productions had multiple nominations:

- 10 nominations: Wicked
- 7 nominations: Assassins
- 6 nominations: Avenue Q, Caroline, or Change, Fiddler on the Roof and Henry IV (a combination of Part 1 and Part 2)
- 5 nominations: The Boy from Oz and Wonderful Town
- 4 nominations: Frozen, Jumpers, A Raisin in the Sun and Taboo
- 3 nominations: Big River, Bombay Dreams, I Am My Own Wife and The Retreat from Moscow
- 2 nominations: Anna in the Tropics, King Lear, Never Gonna Dance and Twentieth Century

The following productions received multiple awards.

- 5 wins: Assassins
- 3 wins: Avenue Q and Wicked
- 2 wins: Henry IV (a combination of Part 1 and Part 2), I Am My Own Wife and A Raisin in the Sun

== See also ==
- Drama Desk Awards
- 2004 Laurence Olivier Awards – equivalent awards for West End theatre productions
- Obie Award
- New York Drama Critics' Circle
- Theatre World Award
- Lucille Lortel Awards
