= Erskineville Kings =

- DVD cover
- Directed by: Alan White
- Written by: Marty Denniss
- Produced by: Alan White; Julio Caro
- Starring: Marty Denniss; Hugh Jackman
- Cinematography: John Swaffield
- Edited by: Jane Moran
- Music by: Don Miller-Robinson; Louis Tillett
- Production company: Radical Media
- Distributed by: Palace Films; Southern Star Entertainment; Umbrella Entertainment
- Release date: 1 January 1999
- Running time: 90 minutes
- Country: Australia
- Language: English
- Box office: $183,691

Erskineville Kings is a 1999 Australian drama film directed and produced by Alan White. The film was produced by Radical Media made for Palace Films on a minimal budget. It was released on 1 January 1999.

The lead actor, Hugh Jackman, in his film debut, won the Film Critics Circle of Australia award for Best Male Actor.

== Plot ==
The film deals with the story of two brothers. Barky (Marty Denniss) is 25 years old and returning to Sydney after two years of living in the northern sugar cane growing areas. He has returned home to attend the funeral of his father. The film begins with Barky's arrival at Central station at dawn, seeking the whereabouts of his brother, Wace (Hugh Jackman). We learn from flashbacks that he left home two years ago to escape the clutches of his father's violent rages. Wace, the older brother, is not too happy about Barky's prolonged absence, having been left to manage looking after their father in his last years of life. After walking through the streets he finds an old mate of his, Wayne (Joel Edgerton), who informs him of the location of his brother. He succeeds in finding his brother through the help of Wayne and friends, who all end up at a pub where it is revealed that Barky and Wace's mother left the family fifteen years earlier and that Wace hastened his father's death after he was struck down by a stroke. Barky also crosses paths with his ex-girlfriend, Lanny, and manages to rekindle the relationship.

== Cast ==
- Marty Denniss as Barky
- Hugh Jackman as Wace
- Joel Edgerton as Wayne
- Andrew Wholley as Coppa
- Leah Vandenberg as Lanny
- Aaron Blabey as Trunny
- Paul Dawber as Father
- Roy Billing as Ticket Officer
- Roxane Wilson as Eve
- Mercia Deane-Johns as Barmaid

== Production ==
The film was shot in the streets of Newtown, Millers Point, and Chippendale, New South Wales, including inside Bob Gould's bookshop in Newtown and the Hollywood Hotel in Surry Hills. The title of the movie refers to the King's Hotel, a fictional hotel in which most of the movie takes place.

== Box office ==
Erskineville Kings grossed $183,691 at the box office in Australia.

== Home entertainment ==
The film has been released on DVD by Umbrella Entertainment.

== See also ==
- Cinema of Australia
