= Palimpsest Press =

Canadian publisher

- Founded: 2000
- Founder: Dawn Marie Kresan
- Country of origin: Canada
- Headquarters location: Windsor, Ontario
- Distribution: LitDistCo
- Fiction genres: poetry, literary criticism, literary non-fiction, literary fiction
- Imprints: Anstruther Books
- Official website: www.palimpsestpress.ca

Palimpsest Press is a Canadian book publishing company based in Windsor, Ontario. Palimpsest publishes poetry and non-fiction titles that deal with poetics, the writing life, art, aesthetics, photography, design, cultural criticism, and biography. Palimpsest Press also publishes literary fiction titles with a focus on Magical realism, surrealism, and explorations of the everyday.

Palimpsest has published several critically acclaimed and award-winning authors such as Aislinn Hunter, Christian Bök, Elisabeth Harvor, Kate Braid, Shawna Lemay, and Steven Heighton.

== History ==
Founded in 2000 by Dawn Marie Kresan, Palimpsest Press is distributed by LitDistCo, with sales representation through the Literary Press Group, and is a member of the Association of Canadian Publishers. Palimpsest Press is now owned by Aimee Parent-Dunn, and the operations moved to Windsor, ON.

Twice Palimpsest poetry titles were longlisted for The ReLit Awards and Shawna Lemay's Calm Things was nominated for the Wilfred Eggleston Award for Nonfiction. In 2010 Ariel Gordon won the John Hirsch Award for most Promising Manitoba Writer and in 2011 her book Hump was nominated for the Eileen McTavish Sykes Award for Best First Book and the Aqua Books Lansdowne Prize for Poetry, winning the latter.

In spring 2018, Palimpsest Press launched the Anstruther Press Imprint, which features poetry books edited by Jim Johnstone.

== Notable publications ==
- Garden of Fools (2012)
