= Code Black =

Code Black may refer to:

- Code Black (emergency code), a hospital emergency code denoting a threat to personnel, patient's own self code black is called during a threat to anyone’s safety within a hospital.
- Code Black, 1997 album by Jimmy Pursey
- Code Black (DJ), Australian DJ and music producer
- Code Black (TV series), a 2015–2018 American television series
- CodeBlack Entertainment, American entertainment conglomerate founded and run by an African-American entrepreneur Jeff Clanagan
- Code Black (film), 2013 documentary film

== See also ==
- Black Code (disambiguation)
- Condition Black, a state of mind
