= Emily Tyra =

American actress, singer and dancer

- Born: Emily Kaitlyn Tyra; November 9, 1987 (age 38); Minneapolis, Minnesota, U.S.
- Occupations: Actress; singer; dancer
- Years active: 2005–present
- Spouse: Adam Santucci (m. 2019)
- Children: 1

Emily Tyra (born November 9, 1987) is an American actress, singer and dancer.

A native of Minneapolis, Tyra grew up studying dance, music, acting and improvisation. Trained in classical ballet, Tyra began her professional career in 2005 as a dancer with the Boston Ballet. In 2011, she made her Broadway debut as a singer and dancer in Hugh Jackman: Back on Broadway. Recent appearances have included portrayal of Dr. Noa Kean in CBS' Code Black television series and Sasha in the horror-comedy film Harpoon.

== Early life and training ==
Tyra was born on November 9, 1987, in Minneapolis, Minnesota. From 1998 to 2005 she studied tap, jazz and classical ballet in numerous pre-professional dance programs, including those offered by Ballet Arts Minnesota, Kaatsbaan International Dance Center, The Joffrey Ballet and on scholarship with the American Ballet Theatre. She graduated from Wayzata High School in Plymouth, Minnesota.

== Career ==
=== Ballet and contemporary dance ===
Selected by audition from more than 300 dancers, Tyra moved to Boston in the summer of 2005 and started her professional career with the Boston Ballet. As an apprentice dancer, she trained with the company’s next generation of dancers and performed in their holiday season production of The Nutcracker. She also served as an ensemble spokesperson at many media and fundraising events.

Upon completing the 2005-2006 season, Tyra turned down a professional contract to perform full-time with the Boston Ballet. She returned to Minneapolis and joined the James Sewell Ballet. For the next three years, she danced both contemporary and new works with this ensemble, focusing heavily on improvisation, multi-disciplinary performance and collaboration with the Twin Cities performing arts community.

=== Musical theater ===
After leaving the James Sewell Ballet, Tyra continued her career in theater. In 2009, Tyra had ensemble roles in Singin’ in the Rain and Dirty Rotten Scoundrels at the Ordway Center in Saint Paul and the Walnut Street Theatre in Philadelphia, respectively. She also performed as a member of the ensemble in Disney’s Beauty and the Beast at the Ordway.

=== Broadway ===
Relocating from Minneapolis to New York City to pursue a career on Broadway, Tyra made her Broadway debut in 2011 with Hugh Jackman in his acclaimed Back on Broadway concert series. From 2011 to 2013, Tyra appeared in other Broadway and Off-Broadway musicals and development projects, including The City Club, Chaplin, Nice Work If You Can Get It, Can-Can and An American in Paris.

Following the cancellation of Code Black in 2018, Tyra returned to musical theater after being recruited for the lead role of Cassie Ferguson in a re-choreographed revival of A Chorus Line at the Signature Theatre.

=== Television and film ===
Beyond Broadway, Tyra has appeared in a number of television and film projects. Following co-starring appearances in several episodes of HBO's Boardwalk Empire, she undertook the role of Mia Bialy in Flesh and Bone, a Starz miniseries of 8 episodes that was first broadcast in November 2015. In 2016, she joined the cast of CBS’s Code Black television series, portraying Dr. Noa Kean in 29 episodes spanning Seasons 2 and 3. She remained a member of the main cast until the series was cancelled in 2018.

Tyra also continues to undertake projects with independent filmmakers, most notably to date being the portrayal of Sasha in comedic horror film Harpoon. At its world premiere at the Rotterdam International Film Festival in January 2019, the film garnered positive reviews by the press.

== Personal life ==
In March 2019, Tyra was diagnosed with a malignant brain tumor and later underwent surgery to remove it. After her wedding to Adam Santucci in June 2019, and a brief period of recovery, Tyra returned to the performing stage in November 2019 as Cassie Ferguson in A Chorus Line. Under medical treatment as of late 2019, she remains open about her condition and has become an advocate for the cancer community.

== Performances ==
=== TV series ===
Year	Title	Role	Notes
2011	Boardwalk Empire	Dancer at Babette’s Nightclub	Season 2 (Episode 201 and 208) (HBO Entertainment)
2015	Flesh and Bone	Mia Bialy	Leading role in miniseries that received 2016 Golden Globe nomination for best limited series. (8 Episodes, Starz)
2016-2018	Code Black	Dr. Noa Kean	Main Cast, Seasons 2 and 3 (29 Episodes, CBS)

=== Film ===
Year	Title	Role	Notes
2019	Harpoon	Sasha	Horror-comedy film (Director: Rob Grant)

=== Theater ===
Year	Title	Role	Notes
2009	Singin' in the Rain	Ensemble	Regional theater (Ordway Center)
2009	Dirty Rotten Scoundrels	Ensemble	Regional theater (Walnut Street Theater)
2009	Beauty and the Beast	Silly Girl #1	Regional theater (Ordway Center)
2010	Joseph and the Amazing Technicolor Dreamcoat	Wife (Ensemble)	Regional theater (North Shore Music Theatre)
2011	Little Dancer (Renamed Marie, Dancing Still)	Delphine	Workshop production (Lincoln Center)
2011-2012	Hugh Jackman: Back on Broadway	Emily	Original Broadway Cast (Broadhurst Theater)
2012	The City Club	Candy (Understudy: Rose)	Off-Broadway Cast (Minetta Lane Theatre)
2012-2013	Chaplin	Lita Grey (Understudy: Oona O’Neill Chaplin)	Broadway Cast (Barrymore Theatre)
2013	Can-Can	Ensemble	Staged reading in New York City, Director: David Lee
2013	Nice Work If You Can Get It	Rosie (Understudy: Duchess Estonia Dulworth, Eileen Evergreen)	Broadway Cast with Matthew Broderick (Imperial Theater)
2013	An American in Paris	Ensemble	Development Lab, Director: Christopher Wheeldon
2019-2020	A Chorus Line	Cassie Ferguson	Regional theater, Choreography: Denis Jones (Signature Theatre)
2023	Into the Woods	Cinderella	Regional theater (Guthrie Theater)

=== Dance ===
Year	Company	Role	Notes
2005-2006	Boston Ballet	Dancer	
2006-2009	James Sewell Ballet	Dancer	Improvisation and multi-disciplinary performance
