= Ryan McGarry =

Ryan McGarry may refer to:

- Ryan McGarry (hurler)
- Ryan McGarry (physician)
