= Code Black (film) =

- Directed by: Ryan McGarry
- Written by: Ryan McGarry; Joshua Altman
- Produced by: Linda Goldstein Knowlton
- Release date: 2013
- Running time: 80 minutes
- Language: English

Code Black is a documentary directed by Ryan McGarry in 2013 that follows the lives of young physicians in the Los Angeles General Medical Center Emergency department. These young residents stand up for medicine in a broken healthcare system. This film enters one of America's busiest emergency rooms where new challenges arise as the young residents try to live up to the previous doctors in the legendary C-booth. The film was adapted by Michael Seitzman into the CBS medical drama Code Black (2015–2018).

== Synopsis ==
This documentary is inspired by the lives of young physicians during their residency with at "C-booth" in the Los Angeles County Hospital trauma bay. The film begins in a chaotic, small room swarming with doctors, nurses and severely injured patients called C-booth. During the film the young physicians talk about their experience in C-booth and why they decided to become doctors.

After the 1994 Northridge earthquake, the hospital underwent new safety regulations and construction began on a new building. As the young doctors enter their last year of residency they faced challenges with the new regulations within the new center. These challenges included a large amount of patients and insurance paperwork, brought upon a congested ER. Patients would wait over fourteen hours to be seen by their physicians and drive hours to this hospital seeking care.

"Code Black" meant that the emergency room was at its full capacity and a busy day was ahead for the doctors. This medical center adopted an ER classification system between 1 and 4 to help distinguish between patients that require immediate attention to a simple cold. For example a 4 could mean a cold or broken finger, 3 could be the flu, 2 could be appendicitis and 1 would be a heart attack or head trauma. In an effort to alleviate patient wait times, the physicians came up with innovative ideas. Their sickest patients would be treated first with paperwork done after, thereby decreasing wait time. With all the obstacles chipping away at them, the young doctors persevered.

=== C-Booth ===
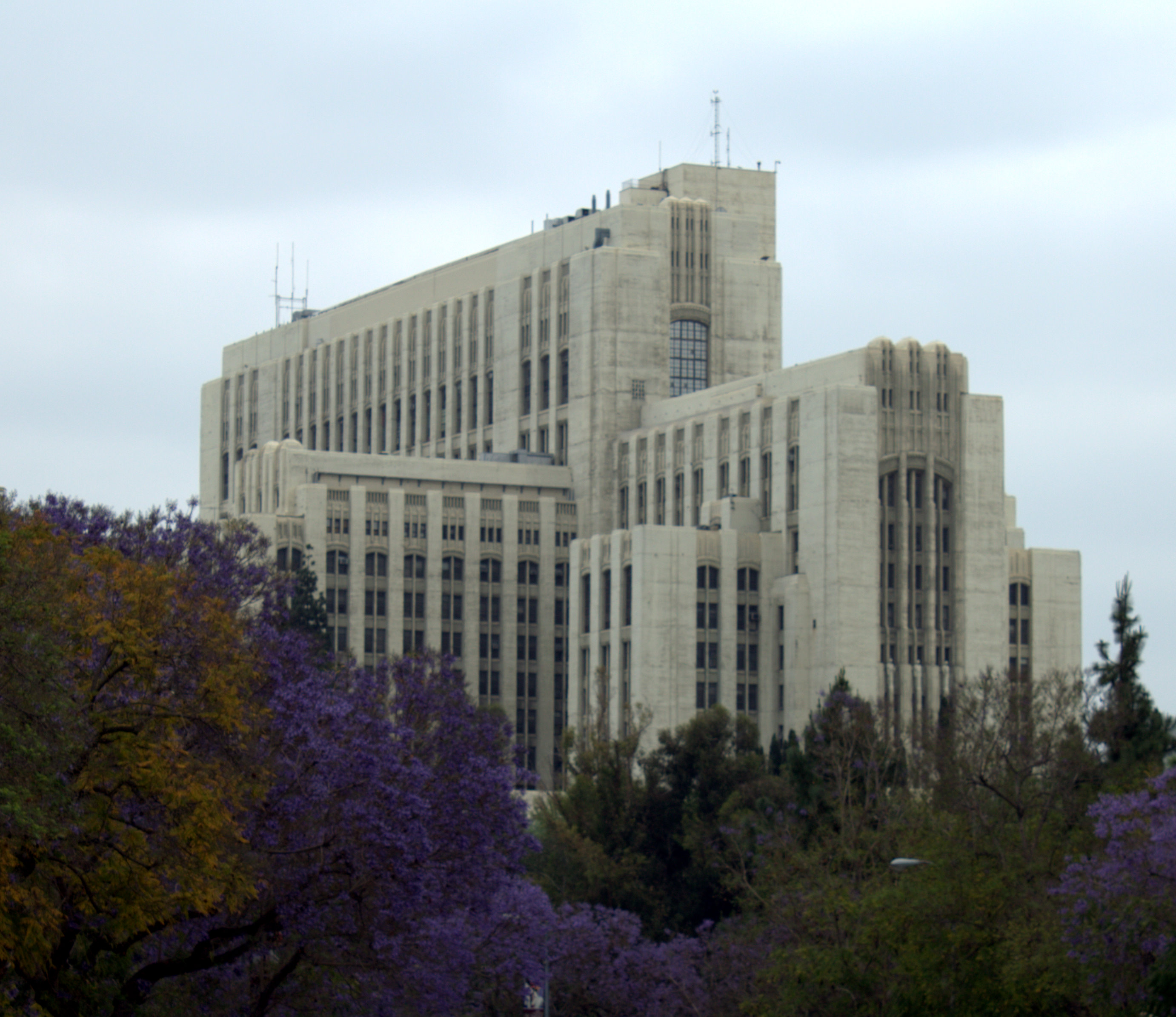
The old hospital, opened in 1933

Before the 1994 Northridge earthquake, there was a space within the trauma bay ER called C-booth. This tiny square foot room was buzzing with staff members awaiting severely injured patients. This small room consist of two hospital beds, a small hall separating the computers and equipment from the beds. During the film, this room is remembered for being a place where doctors were able to study medicine and heal their patients. The young doctors in the film appreciated C-booth for the adrenaline rush it caused and good that it did. This motivated them to construct new concepts derived from C-booth to improve the new ER in the new medical center.

== Awards ==
- 2013: Aspen Filmfest – Audience Favorite Documentary
- 2013: Hamptons International Film Festival – Documentary Feature
- 2013: LA Film Festival – Best Documentary Feature
