= The Man. The Music. The Show. =

2019 concert tour by Hugh Jackman

- Tour by Hugh Jackman
- Promotional poster for the tour
- Location: Scotland; Belgium; Germany; Netherlands; Switzerland; France; Ireland; England; United States; Canada; Australia; New Zealand; Mexico
- Associated album: The Greatest Showman; Broadway and Hollywood musical numbers
- Start date: 7 May 2019
- End date: 20 October 2019
- Legs: 4
- No. of shows: 90

Hugh Jackman concert chronology
- Broadway to Oz (2015); The Man. The Music. The Show. (2019); Live From New York with Love (2025)

The Man. The Music. The Show. was a concert tour by Australian entertainer Hugh Jackman. It showcased material from the soundtrack album The Greatest Showman with Broadway and Hollywood musical numbers backed by a live orchestra. Comprising 90 shows, the tour visited North America, Europe, and Oceania. It began on 7 May 2019 in Glasgow and concluded on 20 October 2019 in Mexico City. The tour was officially announced on 30 November 2018, through the tour's website and is produced by AEG Presents, TEG-Dainty and helmed by Robert Fox.

The show was inspired by Classical Hollywood as well as the 2017 film The Greatest Showman with Warren Carlyle as the creative director, and Ashley Wallen as the choreographer. The tour featured costumes from Tom Ford, and an elevated stage with a runway and a round-shaped front. The central theme of the show was Hollywood glamour and extravagant style, and consisted of different segments, with each inspired by different topics. Inspirations varied from Broadway and Hollywood classic numbers to circus. The setlist had more than 20 songs picked from Jackman's career. Critics gave the tour generally positive reviews, praising Jackman's stage presence, vocals and his energy on stage.

== Background ==
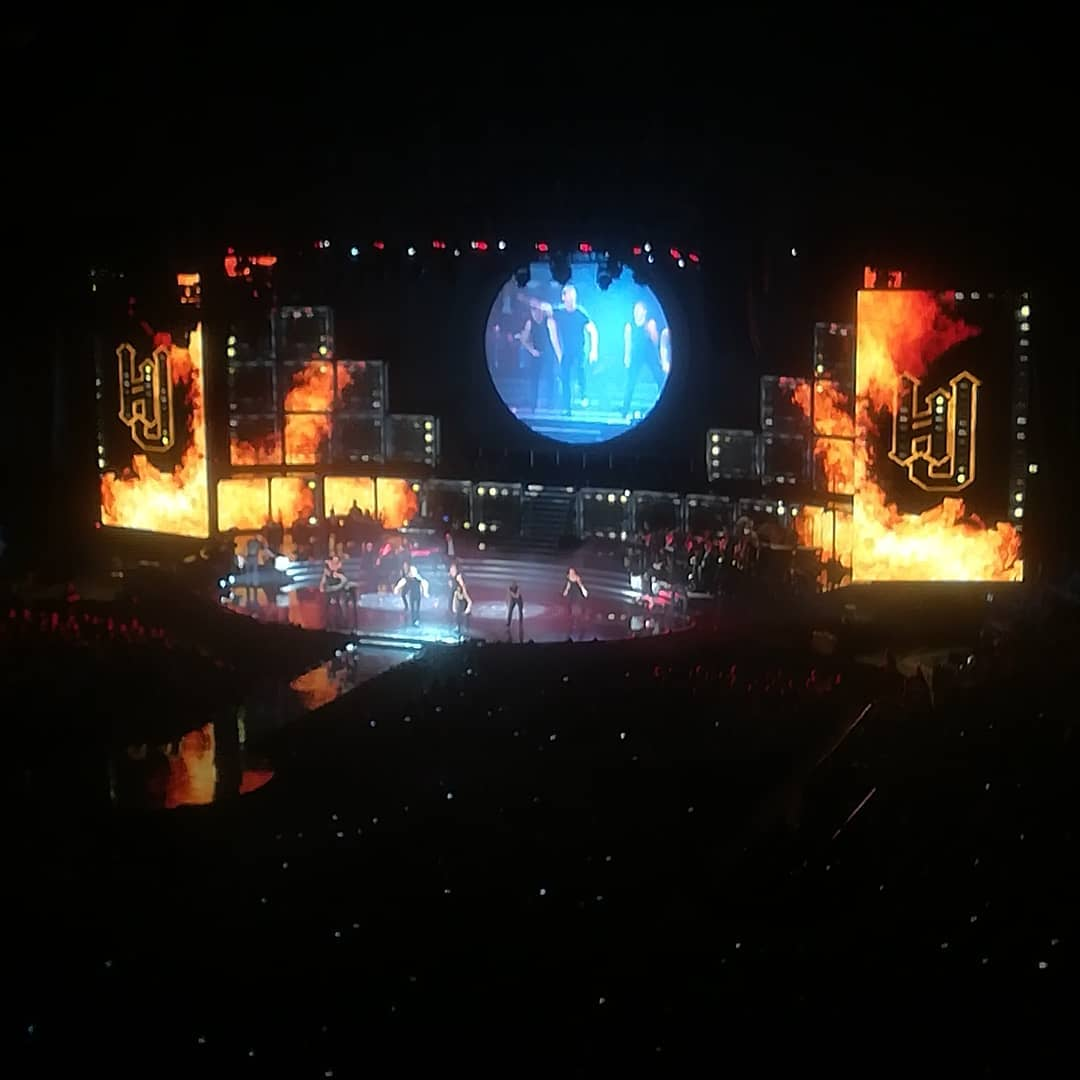
The concert being described as an extravaganza.

Jackman's previous one-man shows including Hugh Jackman: Back on Broadway were critically praised for his vocal performance and stage presence and the album The Greatest Showman Soundtrack received widespread commercial success and earned him a Grammy award; It all led to The Man. The Music. The Show. tour which was announced by Jackman on November 29, 2018, via Twitter. The tour is led by AEG Presents, helmed by Robert Fox and directed by Warren Carlyle. It is Jackman's fourth collaboration with Carlyle.

In an interview about the tour, Jackman explained, "Doing an arena show, for me, is perhaps the ultimate because of the amount of energy and excitement that you can create. Surprisingly to me, [...] you can create a special kind of intimacy." He later clarified, "I want every night to feel like those people saw something that only happened that night [...] I've been on stage a lot over my life and I probably feel more at home there than anywhere."

== Development ==
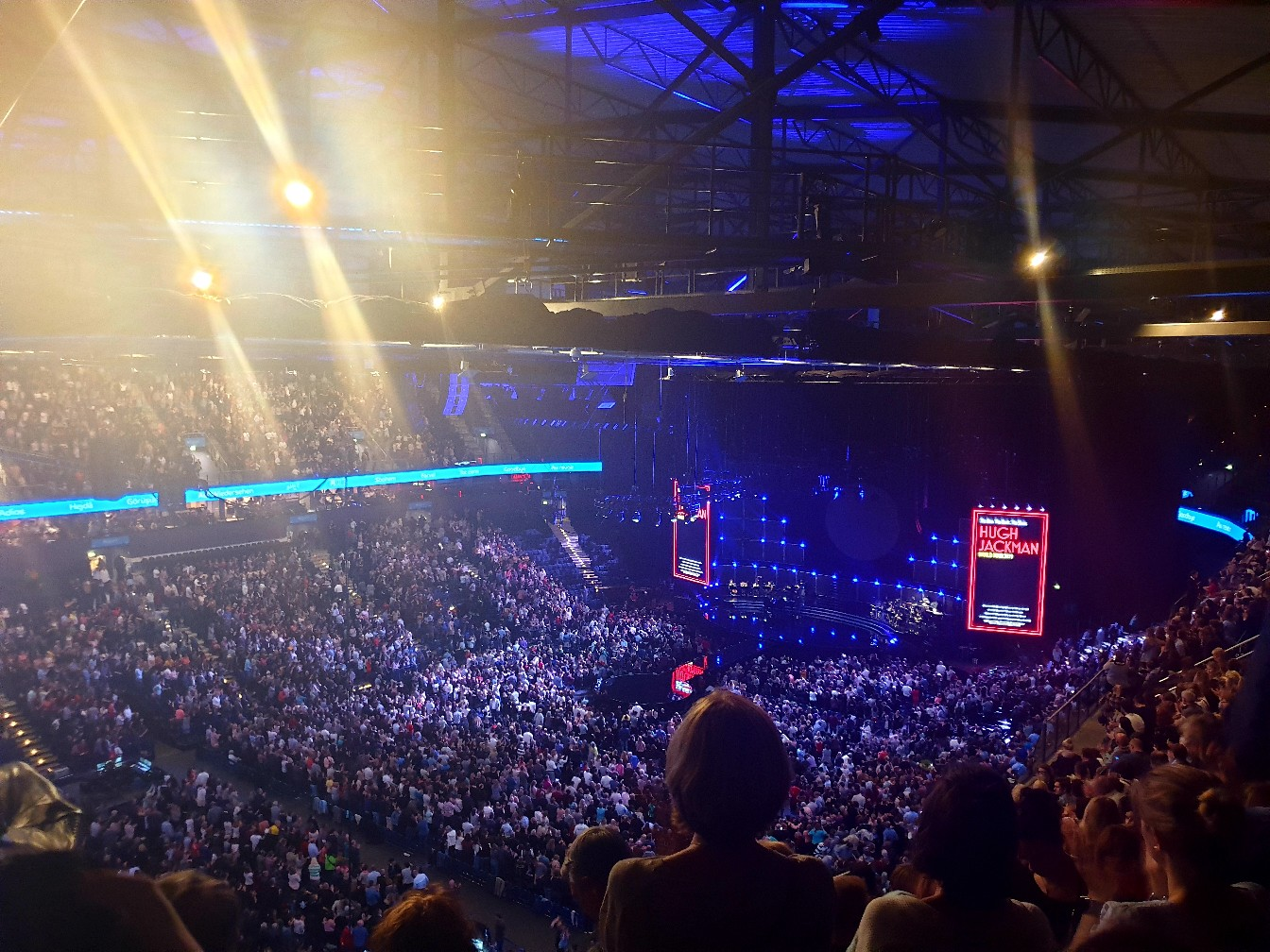
The stage for the tour, with the runway and the round-shaped front.

The tour has been described as an 'extravaganza and characteristically theatrical spectacle' included songs from his musical career. Rehearsals for the tour commenced in January 2019 with involvement from the team of creative directors, producers, designers and choreographers. and the rehearsals occurred for 8 hours per day.

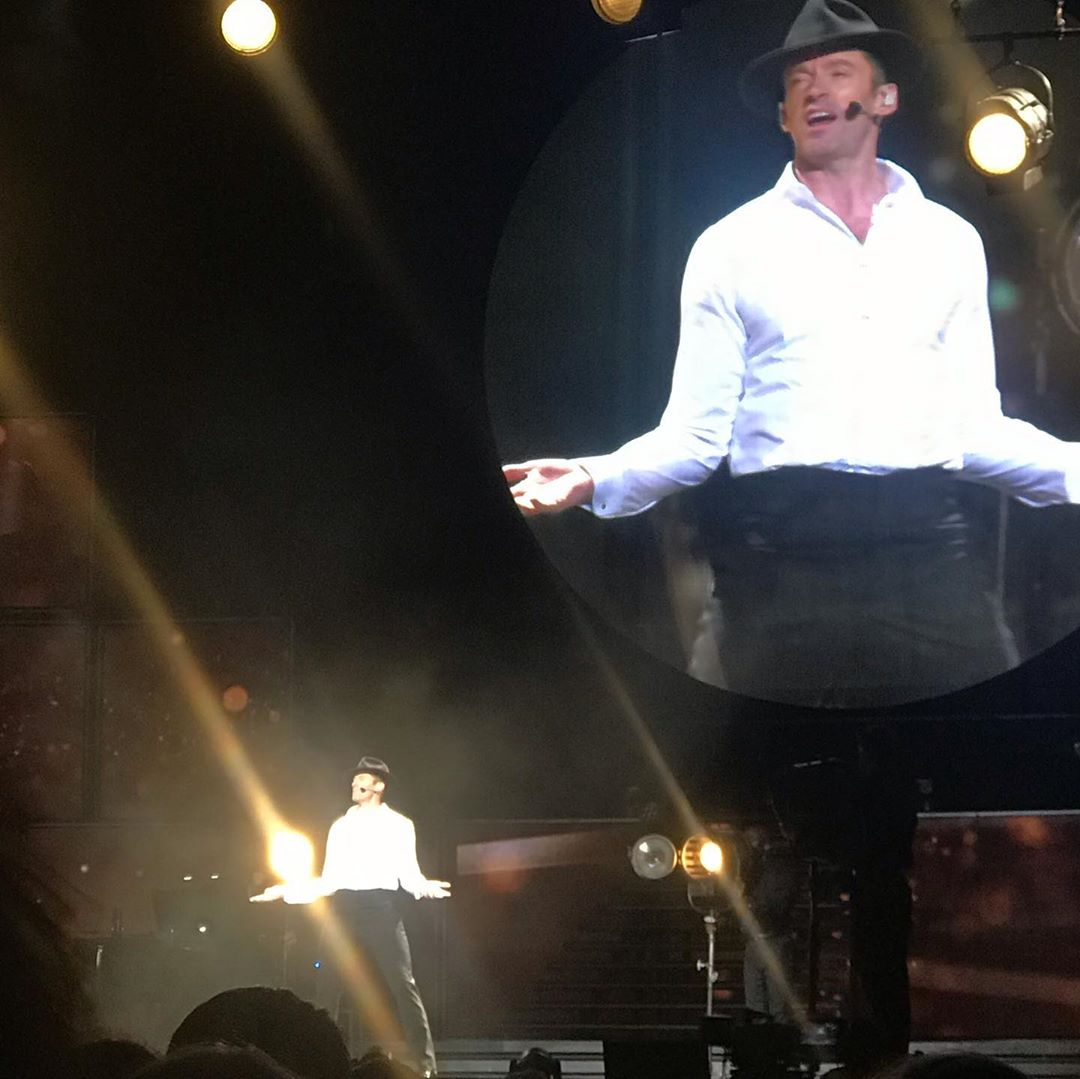
The tap dancing segment was given a retro-inspired ensemble.

The title of the show was explained, "You know the man, you enjoyed the music and now you can see the show." Hollywood glamour and extravaganza were listed as the central themes of the show. Inspirations for The Man. The Music. The Show. tour came from the film, The Greatest Showman, Broadway and Hollywood classic numbers and circus.

Jackman would 'get into different characters' — from Gaston and Jean Valjean to The Boy from Oz’s Peter Allen — when he performs their respective songs. "It’s a state of mind and a commitment and I think the audiences really enjoy the transformation." Jackman said. Speaking to Billboard Jackman stated, "I’m going to do an homage to some of the great musicals. I’m going to dance like I’ve never danced before." and about the setlist, he told, "If I hear the intro to a song and don’t get a tingle, then I take it out. For me, it has to feel like, “I can’t wait to sing this song.” Because if I don't feel that, how can the audience feel excited about it?"

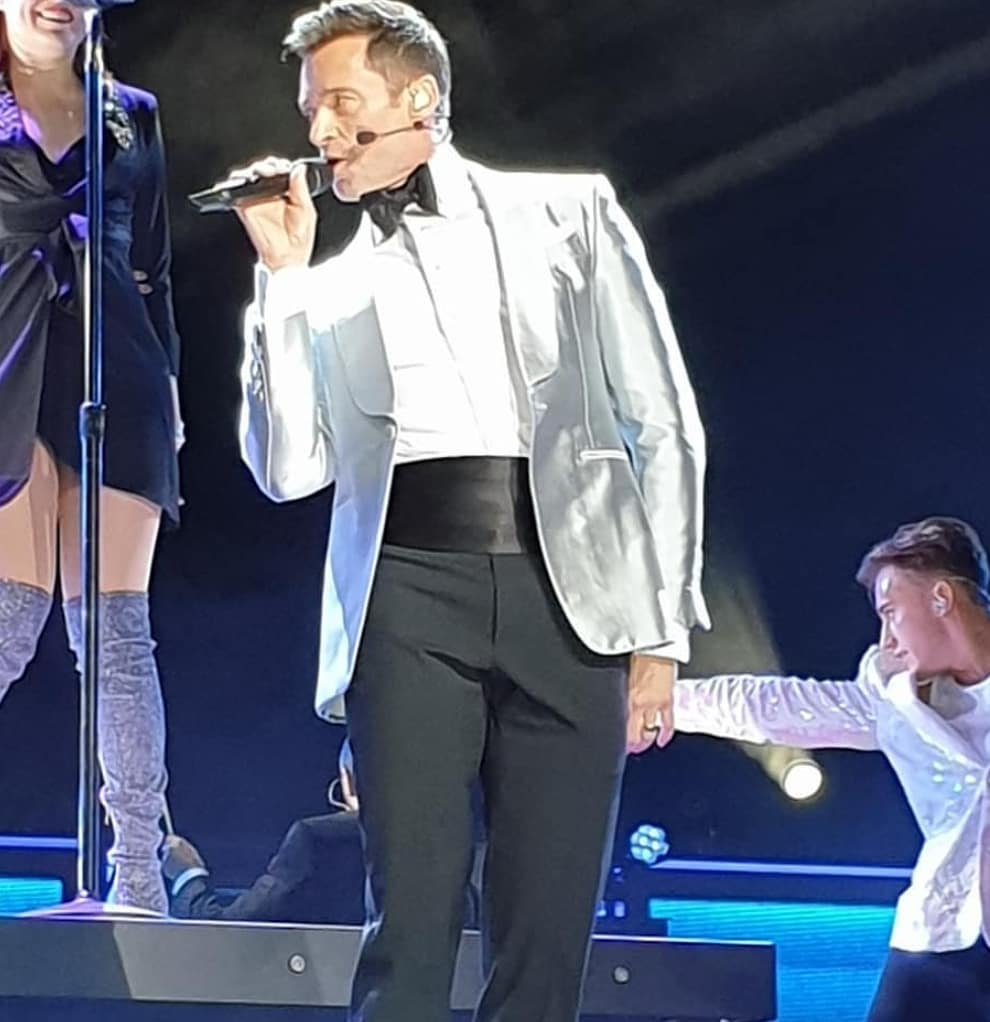
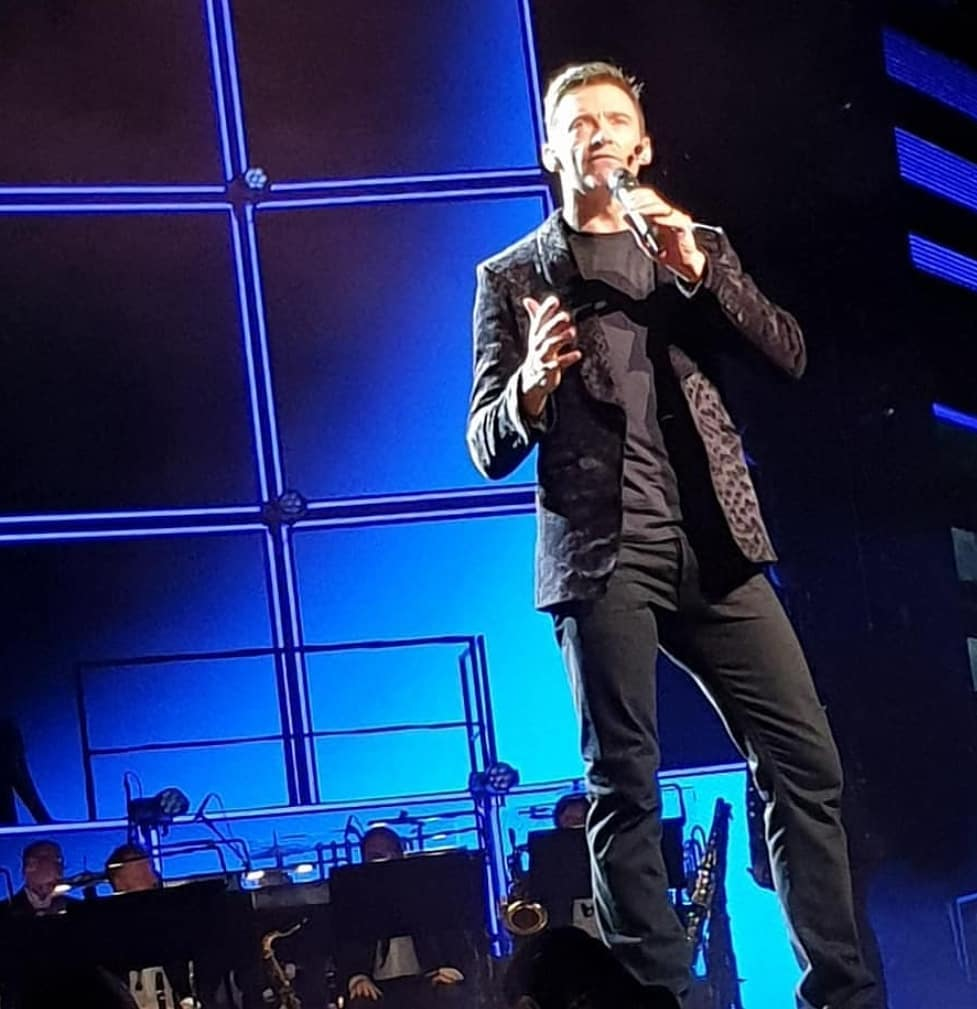
The tour featured designs of Tom Ford

Warren Carlyle was signed as the creative director for the show, while Ashley Wallen choreographed the dancers through intricate dance steps. The large main stage was elevated and set up at the end of the arenas, with a long runway extending from its middle, the pathway ended into a round-shaped front. The tour featured costumes from Tom Ford including, a black snake-print velvet jacket, a metallic silver jacket and an ensemble of white shirt with pleated bib, silk-satin cummerbund and black fedora.

== Concert synopsis ==
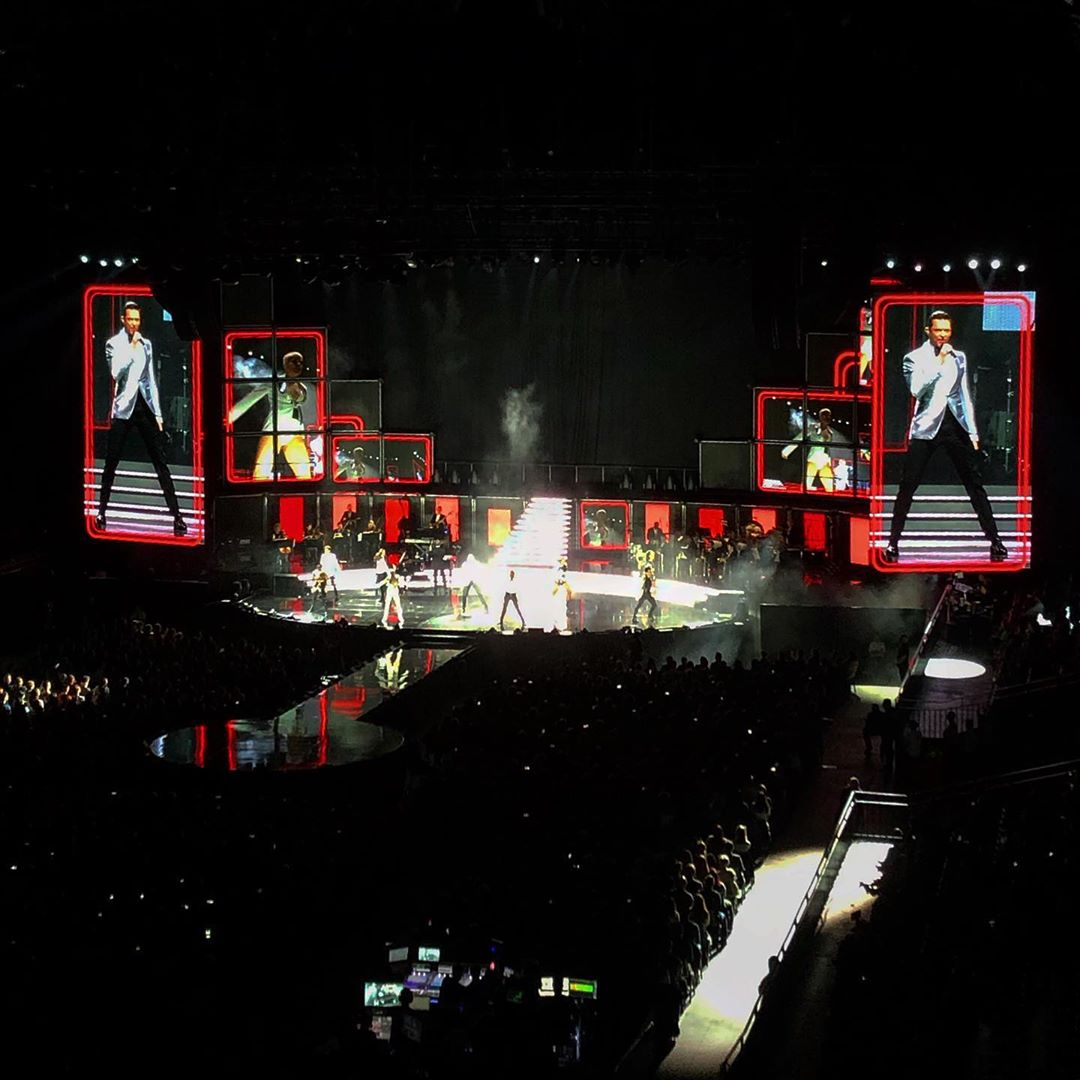
Jackman and his dancers opening the show with a performance of "The Greatest Show".

The show began with a video montage of Jackman's film characters, as Jackman ascended to the stage, clad in a silver tuxedo to sing "The Greatest Show" followed by a performance of "Come Alive". The show continued with "A Million Dreams", which included a sign language interpreter to translate the lyrics.

== Commercial reception ==
=== Ticket sales ===
General sales for the tour started from December 7, 2018. Prices ranged from $50 to $430. Tickets for the shows started selling out rapidly; due to the huge demand for tickets, extra dates were added for Glasgow, Manchester, Birmingham, Dublin and London.

Some of the UK cities sold out within minutes of being available, resulting in Aiken Promotions, warning buyers not to purchase tickets on the website Viagogo, a platform for third-party sellers, claiming, "There is no proof tickets appearing online actually exist." however Viagogo stated, "The tickets sold on our platform are genuine tickets that have been sold on by the original ticket purchaser in good faith."

During the North American leg of the tour, Jackman urged his social media followers to stay vigilant, after an alleged scammer set up fake social media profiles and some became embroiled in a ticket scam. Taking to Twitter, he revealed that fake accounts in his name are targeting his followers, promising meet and greets, to take money from them.

=== Boxscore ===
In June 2019, Billboard announced the first boxscores for the tour, reporting the first leg dates. Total gross was $23.4 million with 289,586 tickets sold from 26 shows in Europe. The tour launched May 7 at Glasgow's SSE Hydro, where he earned $2.7 million across three shows. Jackman continued the trek through May and into June, where he posted sell-out finals at Amsterdam's Ziggo Dome (May 17; $783,000; 10,825 tickets), Zurich's Hallenstadion (May 19; $609,000; 6,313 tickets), and the AccorHotels Arena in Paris (May 22; $834,000; 10,566 tickets), among others. The leg finished on a high note with a six-show run at London's O2 Arena from June 2–7. There, Jackman grossed $7.4 million from 93,566 tickets sold.

== Critical response ==
=== Europe ===
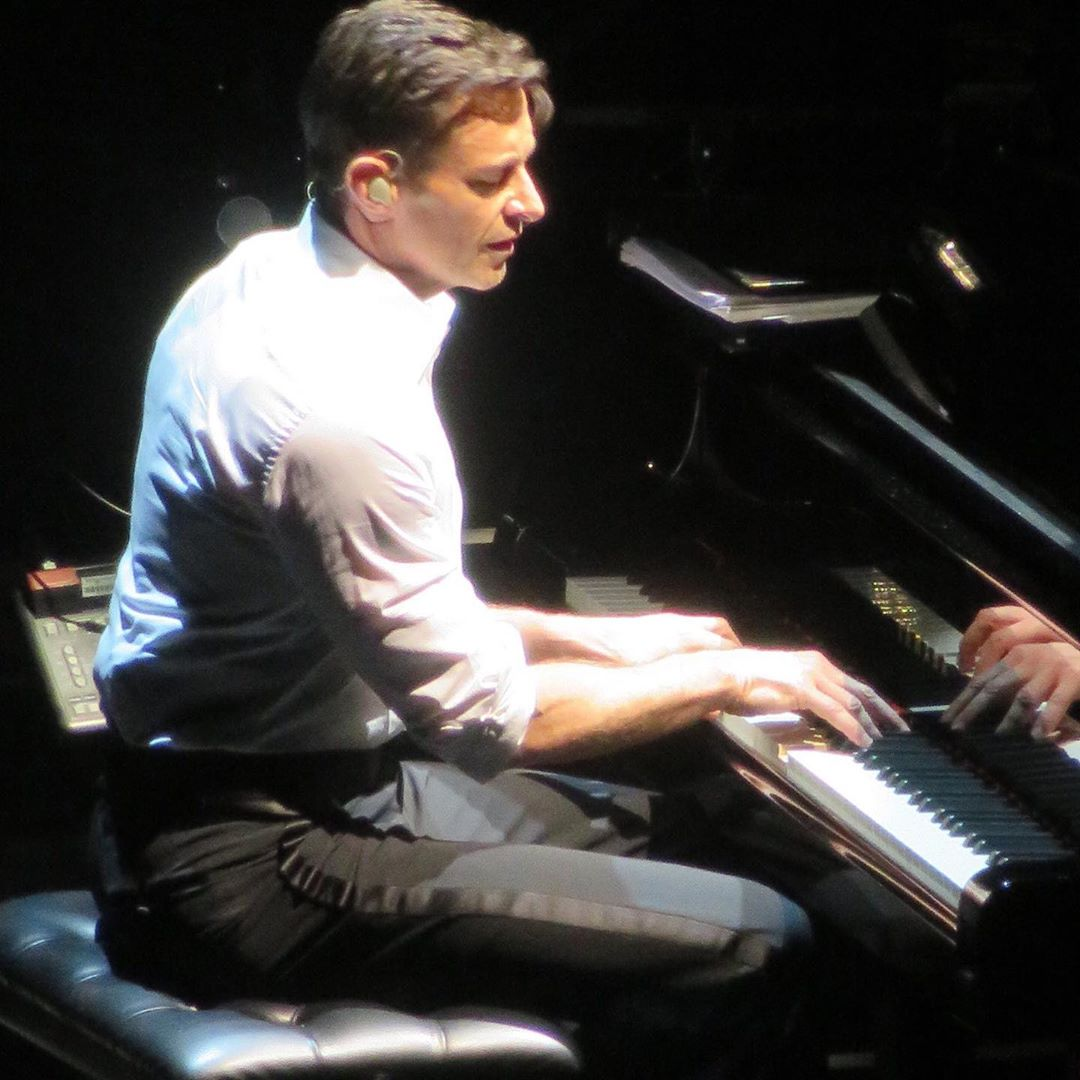
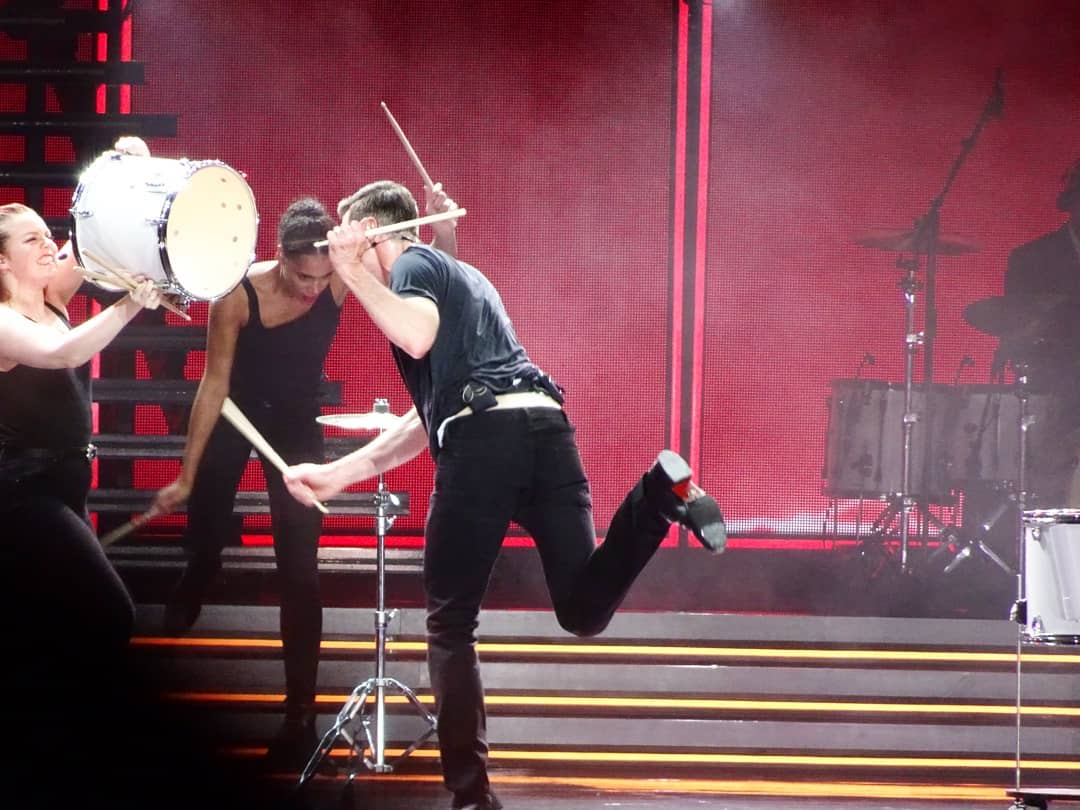
Jackman playing instruments during the show.

Mark Fisher of The Guardian gave the concert a score of 5/5, and said, "The renaissance man’s song-and-dance spectacular skips merrily through Jackman's acting career with celebrity pizzazz and unashamed sentimentality." David Pollock of The Daily Telegraph gave it 4/5 stating, "The sense of natural showmanship that made him perfect for the role of PT Barnum was tangible, and – along with his raw, rustic baritone – it carried the evening." Paul Little of The Times reacted positively, saying: "[...]for Hugh Jackman, a combination of charm, being multi-talented and possessing leading man looks defines him." Natalie O'Donoghue of BroadwayWorld gave it 5/5, stating "Jackman is a born entertainer who had the 13,000 strong audience in the palm of his hand the entire evening." Steven MacKenzie of The Big Issue referred to the dramatic moments of the musicals saying, "Of all his formidable, envy-inducing skills, he is a truly great actor." Emily Heward of Manchester Evening News gave it 4/5, writing, "It’s hard to imagine any of Hollywood’s other leading men carrying off an all-singing, all-dancing revue with such charisma. Schmaltzy? Yes. Indulgent? Absolutely. But it’s also irresistibly good fun." Ciara O'Brien of The Irish Times simply wrote, "He came, he tap-danced to AC/DC, he conquered." Francesca Steele of The Times gave it 5/5 saying, "Jackman has oodles of pizzazz and his charm filled the arena." Andre Paine of Evening Standard wrote, "The greatest showman, or a self-indulgent superstar? A bit of both, perhaps. But Jackman’s energetic arena show is supremely entertaining." Sophia Dellapina of Manchester’s Finest branded the show, "A colourful, wild, energetic, stunning hybrid of cinema, theatre, and music." and said, "Although I was slightly distracted by how great his bum looked for the duration of the concert, his dancing was yet another highlight- especially the tap dancing sequence." The critic of EILE Magazine said, "It was slick but had a sense of spontaneity, It was polished but personal." Calling Jackman "An old-fashioned hoofer, crooner and matinee idol." Kate Goerner of TheatreReviewsNorth said, "Indeed you only have to look at the audience to see that here is a performer who appeals to all demographics. From girls' nights out to middle-aged couples to small children dressed up in ringmaster garb, it’s rare to see such a mixed bunch making up a 17,000 strong sell-out Manchester Arena audience."

=== North America ===
Writing for the Houston Chronicle, Joey Guerra noted that "Jackman can sing and dance marvelously, to be sure. But he's also gifted with the ability to fully inhabit a character. It turned every song into a real moment." Ross Raihala from St. Paul Pioneer Press dubbed the show "campy and engaging" saying, "Jackman delivered the sort of old-fashioned, high-glamour evening of Hollywood spectacle that was once common on stage and screen, but is rarely produced at this level today." Jon Bream of Star Tribune branded the concert, "uncompromisingly ambitious, flashily entertaining and consistently uplifting." Gary Graff from The Oakland Press described the show as, "an arena-sized song, dance and video spectacular, extravagantly staged and delivered with an engaging, sincere exuberance that transcends its script." Barbara Schuler from Newsday reviewed the show at Madison Square Garden, saying "Jackman was captivated the audience with song-and-dance numbers, along with some lovely, intimate moments." Melissa Ruggieri from The Atlanta Journal-Constitution labeled the show "Jackman’s own Broadway spectacle" whose talents can "ably command the arena." Sarah Harris of Daily Herald wrote, "Jackman put on a thrilling spectacle and dazzled the arena with showmanship." Gil Kaan of BroadwayWorld dubbed the show "sensational" and said, "Utilizing his spectacular combo of sturdy vocals, fancy footwork, and multi-watt charm, Jackman owned the Bowl stage. He certainly knows how to work his audience into a frenzy, hitting all emotions." Naming Jackman, "The last of a dying breed: the all-round entertainer." Charles McNulty from Los Angeles Times wrote, "The two sides of his performing identity — movie star and musical trouper — came together in a homage to movie musicals. He knows how to punctuate a big number with an arm hoisted like a victory flag." Angelique Jackson of Variety stated, "The show is a wide-ranging experience overall, but the setlist feels cohesive because it’s personal, navigating Jackman’s history as a performer and showing off his eclectic musical tastes."

== Set list ==
Setlist from the concert on 7 May 2019 in Glasgow, Scotland. It does not represent all shows throughout the tour.

1. "The Greatest Show"
2. "Come Alive"
3. "Gaston"
4. "All the Way"
5. "I've Been Everywhere"
6. "You Will Be Found"
7. "Someone to Love"
8. "Soliloquy"
9. "This Is Me"
10. "Valjean's Soliloquy/I Dreamed a Dream/One Day More"

Intermission

1. "The Boy Next Door"
2. "Arthur's Theme (Best That You Can Do)/Don't Cry Out Loud/I Honestly Love You/Quiet Please, There's a Lady on Stage/I Go to Rio"
3. "Tenterfield Saddler"
4. "A Million Dreams"
5. "Luck Be a Lady / Singin' in the Rain / I Got Rhythm / Steppin' Out With My Baby / Sing Sing Sing"
6. "Nomad Two Worlds - Art Song"
7. "Nomad Two Worlds - Inhibition"
8. "Somewhere Over the Rainbow"
9. "Mack the Knife"
10. "From Now On"
11. "Once Before I Go"

== Shows ==
List of concerts, showing date, city, country, and venue
Date	City	Country	Venue	Guest Acts	Attendance	Revenue
Leg 1 – Europe
7 May 2019	Glasgow	Scotland	SSE Hydro	—N/a	31,991 / 32,172	$2,734,850
8 May 2019	Glasgow	Scotland	SSE Hydro	—N/a	31,991 / 32,172	$2,734,850
9 May 2019	Glasgow	Scotland	SSE Hydro	—N/a	31,991 / 32,172	$2,734,850
12 May 2019	Antwerp	Belgium	Sportpaleis	—N/a	—	—
13 May 2019	Hamburg	Germany	Barclaycard Arena	—N/a	9,199 / 11,515	$969,113
14 May 2019	Berlin	Germany	Mercedes-Benz Arena	—N/a	7,623 / 10,840	$822,294
16 May 2019	Cologne	Germany	Lanxess Arena	—N/a	10,322 / 13,510	$1,124,260
17 May 2019	Amsterdam	Netherlands	Ziggo Dome	—N/a	10,825/ 10,825	$782,606
19 May 2019	Zürich	Switzerland	Hallenstadion	Keala Settle	—	—
21 May 2019	Mannheim	Germany	SAP Arena	Keala Settle	7,499 / 8,479	$835,217
22 May 2019	Paris	France	AccorHotels Arena	Keala Settle	10,566 / 10,566	$834,116
24 May 2019	Manchester	England	Manchester Arena	Keala Settle	43,479 / 44,072	$2,985,550
25 May 2019 (Note: Two shows on 25 May 2019.)	Manchester	England	Manchester Arena	Keala Settle	43,479 / 44,072	$2,985,550
27 May 2019 (Note: Two shows on 27 May 2019.)	Birmingham	England	Resorts World Arena	Keala Settle	36,107 / 36,107	$2,677,243
28 May 2019	Birmingham	England	Resorts World Arena	Keala Settle	36,107 / 36,107	$2,677,243
30 May 2019	Dublin	Ireland	3Arena	—N/a	25,035 / 25,035	$2,075,718
31 May 2019 (Note: Two shows on 31 May 2019.)	Dublin	Ireland	3Arena	—N/a	25,035 / 25,035	$2,075,718
2 June 2019	London	England	The O_{2} Arena	Keala Settle; Robbie Williams; Taron Egerton (selected dates)	93,566 / 93,566	$7,441,090
3 June 2019	London	England	The O_{2} Arena	Keala Settle; Robbie Williams; Taron Egerton (selected dates)	93,566 / 93,566	$7,441,090
4 June 2019	London	England	The O_{2} Arena	Keala Settle; Robbie Williams; Taron Egerton (selected dates)	93,566 / 93,566	$7,441,090
5 June 2019	London	England	The O_{2} Arena	Keala Settle; Robbie Williams; Taron Egerton (selected dates)	93,566 / 93,566	$7,441,090
6 June 2019	London	England	The O_{2} Arena	Keala Settle; Robbie Williams; Taron Egerton (selected dates)	93,566 / 93,566	$7,441,090
7 June 2019	London	England	The O_{2} Arena	Keala Settle; Robbie Williams; Taron Egerton (selected dates)	93,566 / 93,566	$7,441,090
Leg 2 – North America
18 June 2019	Houston	United States	Toyota Center	—N/a	10,648 / 10,648	$1,041,486
19 June 2019	Dallas	United States	American Airlines Center	—N/a	12,587 / 13,714	$1,164,273
21 June 2019	Chicago	United States	United Center	—N/a	13,070 / 13,070	$1,328,925
22 June 2019	Saint Paul	United States	Xcel Energy Center	—N/a	13,160 / 13,160	$1,326,611
24 June 2019	Detroit	United States	Little Caesars Arena	—N/a	12,138 / 13,006	$1,216,158
25 June 2019	Toronto	Canada	Scotiabank Arena	—N/a	12,556 / 12,915	$1,188,734
27 June 2019	Boston	United States	TD Garden	—N/a	12,335 / 12,335	$1,266,320
28 June 2019	New York City	United States	Madison Square Garden	—N/a	34,944 / 36,230	$4,242,613
29 June 2019 (Note: Two shows on 29 June 2019.)	New York City	United States	Madison Square Garden	—N/a	34,944 / 36,230	$4,242,613
30 June 2019	Philadelphia	United States	Wells Fargo Center	—N/a	12,835 / 12,835	$1,289,305
1 July 2019	Washington, D.C.	United States	Capital One Arena	—N/a	12,831 / 12,831	$1,308,382
3 July 2019	Atlanta	United States	State Farm Arena	—N/a	10,114 / 10,989	$1,060,824
5 July 2019	Tampa	United States	Amalie Arena	—N/a	12,507 / 12,507	$1,253,403
6 July 2019	Sunrise	United States	BB&T Center	—N/a	10,050 / 11,708	$1,037,306
10 July 2019	Denver	United States	Pepsi Center	—N/a	11,433 / 11,848	$1,138,038
11 July 2019	Salt Lake City	United States	Vivint Smart Home Arena	—N/a	21,250 / 21,250	$2,104,745
12 July 2019	Salt Lake City	United States	Vivint Smart Home Arena	—N/a	21,250 / 21,250	$2,104,745
13 July 2019	Las Vegas	United States	MGM Grand Garden Arena	—N/a	10,212 / 11,242	$1,089,574
14 July 2019	Glendale	United States	Gila River Arena	—N/a	11,183 / 12,226	$1,057,510
16 July 2019	San Diego	United States	Pechanga Arena	—N/a	9,153 / 9,448	$885,796
17 July 2019	San Jose	United States	SAP Center at San Jose	—N/a	11,466 / 11,466	$1,214,715
19 July 2019	Los Angeles	United States	Hollywood Bowl	—N/a	—	—
20 July 2019	Los Angeles	United States	Hollywood Bowl	—N/a	—	—
Leg 3 – Oceania
2 August 2019	Sydney	Australia	Qudos Bank Arena	—N/a	76,483 / 78,209	$6,502,850
3 August 2019 (Note: Two shows on 3 August 2019.)	Sydney	Australia	Qudos Bank Arena	—N/a	76,483 / 78,209	$6,502,850
4 August 2019	Sydney	Australia	Qudos Bank Arena	—N/a	76,483 / 78,209	$6,502,850
5 August 2019	Sydney	Australia	Qudos Bank Arena	—N/a	76,483 / 78,209	$6,502,850
7 August 2019	Sydney	Australia	Qudos Bank Arena	—N/a	76,483 / 78,209	$6,502,850
10 August 2019 (Note: Two shows on 10 August 2019.)	Adelaide	Australia	Adelaide Entertainment Centre	—N/a	47,709 / 47,709	$3,217,627
11 August 2019 (Note: Two shows on 11 August 2019.)	Adelaide	Australia	Adelaide Entertainment Centre	—N/a	47,709 / 47,709	$3,217,627
13 August 2019	Adelaide	Australia	Adelaide Entertainment Centre	—N/a	47,709 / 47,709	$3,217,627
16 August 2019	Melbourne	Australia	Rod Laver Arena	—N/a	—	—
17 August 2019 (Note: Two shows on 17 August 2019.)	Melbourne	Australia	Rod Laver Arena	—N/a	—	—
18 August 2019 (Note: Two shows on 18 August 2019.)	Melbourne	Australia	Rod Laver Arena	—N/a	—	—
21 August 2019	Perth	Australia	Perth Arena	—N/a	45,117 / 48,088	$3,818,120
23 August 2019	Perth	Australia	Perth Arena	—N/a	45,117 / 48,088	$3,818,120
24 August 2019 (Note: Two shows on 24 August 2019.)	Perth	Australia	Perth Arena	—N/a	45,117 / 48,088	$3,818,120
27 August 2019	Melbourne	Australia	Rod Laver Arena	—N/a	—	—
31 August 2019 (Note: Two shows on 31 August 2019.)	Brisbane	Australia	Brisbane Entertainment Centre	—N/a	17,770 / 18,166	$1,633,870
1 September 2019 (Note: Two shows on 1 September 2019.)	Brisbane	Australia	Brisbane Entertainment Centre	—N/a	27,080 / 27,415	$2,485,787
3 September 2019	Brisbane	Australia	Brisbane Entertainment Centre	—N/a	27,080 / 27,415	$2,485,787
6 September 2019	Auckland	New Zealand	Spark Arena	—N/a	17,031 / 17,031	$1,404,058
7 September 2019	Auckland	New Zealand	Spark Arena	—N/a	17,031 / 17,031	$1,404,058
Leg 4 – North America
1 October 2019	Boston	United States	TD Garden	Keala Settle	—	—
2 October 2019	Philadelphia	United States	Wells Fargo Center	Keala Settle	—	—
5 October 2019	Uniondale	United States	Nassau Coliseum	Keala Settle	10,739 / 10,739	$1,268,145
6 October 2019	Newark	United States	Prudential Center	Keala Settle	—	—
9 October 2019	Pittsburgh	United States	PPG Paints Arena	Keala Settle	—	—
10 October 2019	Columbus	United States	Value City Arena	Keala Settle	—	—
11 October 2019	Chicago	United States	United Center	Keala Settle	—	—
12 October 2019	Indianapolis	United States	Bankers Life Fieldhouse	Keala Settle	—	—
13 October 2019	Kansas City	United States	Sprint Center	Keala Settle	—	—
15 October 2019	San Antonio	United States	AT&T Center	Keala Settle	—	—
19 October 2019	Mexico City	Mexico	Mexico City Arena	Keala Settle	—	—
20 October 2019	Mexico City	Mexico	Mexico City Arena	Keala Settle	—	—
Total
