= List of Code Black episodes =

Code Black is an American medical drama starring Marcia Gay Harden and Rob Lowe that premiered on CBS on September 30, 2015. The series follows the understaffed, busy emergency room of Angels Memorial Hospital, which lacks sufficient resources. On May 16, 2016, the show was renewed for a second season, which premiered on September 28, 2016. On May 14, 2017, CBS renewed the show for a third season. On May 24, 2018, CBS canceled the series after three seasons. During the course of the series, 47 episodes of Code Black aired over three seasons.

== Series overview ==
Season	Episodes	Originally released	
Season	Episodes	First released	Last released
1	18	September 30, 2015	February 24, 2016
2	16	September 28, 2016	February 8, 2017
3	13	April 25, 2018	July 18, 2018

== Episodes ==
=== Season 1 (2015–16) ===
No. overall	No. in season	Title	Directed by	Written by	Original release date	Prod. code	U.S. viewers (millions)
1	1	"Pilot"	David Semel	Michael Seitzman	September 30, 2015	CB101	8.58
The new residents at Angels Memorial Hospital in Los Angeles are introduced to the ER and deal with a series of patients including a dropped-off gang member, a foreign child with a collapsed lung, an organ donor and his daughter who were in a car crash, a stroke patient, and a nine-month pregnant woman with unexplained flu symptoms.
2	2	"We Plug Holes"	Christopher Misiano	Michael Seitzman	October 7, 2015	CB102	6.83
The ER deals with car crash victims, a hockey player suffering from seizures who is unwilling to acknowledge his illness, a blind 14-year-old climber and a woman desperate to have her dead husband's baby.
3	3	"Pre-Existing Conditions"	Lee Rose	David Marshall Grant	October 14, 2015	CB103	6.96
The ER is under a 36 hour period of code black and receives two brothers involved in a car accident. Their mother shuns one son because she holds him responsible for the death of the other. Leighton is pushed by fellow resident Savetti to cut open the chest of a patient who had come in with pelvic, chest and rib fractures. Lorenson faces a moral dilemma while treating a prisoner with kidney failure.
4	4	"Sometimes It's a Zebra"	Adam Kane	Brett Mahoney	October 21, 2015	CB104	7.13
Dr. Guthrie's son joins the hospital as a surgeon and often disagrees with Leanne. Meanwhile, after the death of her son, Christa struggles to help an infant.
5	5	"Doctors with Borders"	David Von Ancken	Molly Newman	October 28, 2015	CB105	5.96
The ER is overwhelmed with patients with an unknown respiratory ailment, requiring them to be quarantined. When Dr. Hudson's mother is among them, he clashes with his father over the proper treatment. A man impaled on a piece of rebar is desperate to make up with his daughter.
6	6	"In Extremis"	Vincent Misiano	Matt Partney and Corey Evett	November 4, 2015	CB106	6.44
The ER must deal with two shot police officers, and the dilemma whether to save one of them or their shooter. A man deals with his gay, brain dead son's lover. Tensions between the two Dr. Guthries heat up. Pineda must deal with her pregnant former lover.
7	7	"Buen Árbol"	Nick Gomez	Corinne Marrinan	November 11, 2015	CB107	6.90
The ER must deal with the injured after a car ran onto a sidewalk at a street fair, along with the driver who seems to suffer from seizure-induced amnesia. Other patients include a child of an illegal immigrant, a young woman whose eye is bulging out (Skyler Day), an old lady prepared to face her end, and a man with an enlarged organ who puts Savetti in an uncomfortable position.
8	8	"You Are the Heart"	Alex Zakrzewski	David Marshall Grant	November 18, 2015	CB108	6.59
On a rainy LA night, the ER deals with the victims of a boating accident, an HIV-positive patient which endangers Savetti and causes tensions between him and Leighton, and Guthrie and Rorish butt heads on a surgery. Pineda runs a bone marrow drive for her former lover, much to her dismay.
9	9	"The Son Rises"	Andrew Bernstein	Michael Seitzman and Kristen Kim	November 25, 2015	CB109	7.45
A family is the victim of a home invasion with a father who was stabbed near the heart, a mother who was repeatedly stabbed, and a son who was injured during his search for rescue by jumping from a window of the building. Mario and Angus clash over the mother who has bruising around her eyes. Taylor is suspended for bringing a child around the ER, and the doctors clash early with his replacement. Meanwhile, a son struggles to get his father off life support.
10	10	"Cardiac Support"	Oz Scott	Brett Mahoney	December 2, 2015	CB110	8.50
The ER adjusts to the new department head who questions Rorish's decisions. An ambulance arrives with its paramedics knocked out by their patient, who attacks Jesse. Later, Jesse has a heart attack. As the doctors try to save him, other patients include a man hit by a train, the daughter of a controlling Beverly Hills mother, and the wife of a veteran who is struggling with addiction. Meanwhile, Mario leaves the hospital to find the train victim's son who has intellectual disabilities, against Hudson's orders.
11	11	"Black Tag"	Omar Madha	Molly Newman	December 9, 2015	CB111	8.38
Leanne, Neal, Christa, Angus, Mario, Malaya, and Heather are sent to the scene of a multi-car collision on a canyon road above Los Angeles. Leanne clashes with the physician in charge, making a decision he questions. Christa treats an injured family whose car is in a ravine. Angus, Heather, and Mario help a man stuck in cement. Mario and Heather find their lives in danger when a patient's husband holds them at gunpoint to save his wife. Meanwhile, Jesse recovers from his heart attack.
12	12	"The Fog of War"	Rob Bailey	David Marshall Grant	January 13, 2016	CB112	6.66
Neal stays behind at the car crash scene to look for Christa, Mario, and Heather. Mario and Heather continue trying to revive the wife of a grieving husband, who later attempts to commit suicide. Leanne and Neal face the consequences of having left a patient in Malaya's care resulting in both doctors being investigated. After Heather hugs Angus, he decides he wants to ask her out, unaware she has a relationship with Mario. Carla gives birth to her son, Philip, before dying.
13	13	"First Date"	Constantine Makris	Kristen Kim	January 20, 2016	CB113	7.29
When a 16-year-old girl who is from a Christian-Scientist family comes into Angels requiring surgery, the ER must deal with her father who forbids the surgery. Angus' brother begins an observational rotation prior to accepting a new job in the hospital as an attending surgeon. Christa treats a patient who is experiencing breathing problems who doesn't seem to be improving; when the patient dies following discharge, she blames herself for her death. Later, Neal and Christa kiss, while Malaya treats a patient named Gordon who flirts with her. Meanwhile, Leanne decides to leave her job.
14	14	"The Fifth Stage"	Oz Scott	Brett Mahoney	January 27, 2016	CB114	7.49
In a shooting accident between two feuding families, one of the victims requires a liver transplant with their cousin being the perfect match; however, the father refuses. Neal and Christa begin their relationship and Leanne forgives the drunk driver who killed her family. Malaya again deals with Gordon, who seems to be following her more often now. Later, he sneaks into the staff lockers to confront Gina, but he stabs her to death. Christa discovers her body and calls for help.
15	15	"Diagnosis of Exclusion"	David Von Ancken	Corey Evett and Matthew Partney	February 3, 2016	CB115	6.90
In the aftermath of Gina's death, the doctors are questioned. Gordon had been at the hospital at least 17 times under different aliases and frequently asking for Malaya. Once Gina had been attacked, he followed Malaya to the elevator. She lies to him and takes another floor, but he continues to follow her. He asks her out, but she tells him that she is gay. Angry, he attacks her by slitting her and attempts to rape her. Angus arrives in time and pushes Gordon to the ground. He tells her to go to the ER. During Angus' fight with Gordon, Gordon accidentally stabs a knife into his neck. Angus, who had lied to human resources, heard Gordon telling him that he intended to kill Malaya and Angus lets him to bleed out, ultimately killing him when complications arose. At center stage, while all three were being treated, Gina is pronounced dead when surgery was no longer an option to save her and everyone mourns her death. Meanwhile, Leanne is given Gina's job and Neal is put on probation for surgery. Neal and Christa announce their relationship to human resources.
16	16	"Hail Mary"	Alex Zakrzewski	Michael Seitzman & Molly Newman	February 10, 2016	CB116	7.11
Christa becomes insecure in her new relationship with Neal when his ex-girlfriend Dr. Grace Adams (Meagan Good), returns to Angels Memorial after spending a year volunteering in Haiti. Also, New York Giants wide receiver Odell Beckham Jr. comes to the ER to convince his stubborn high school football coach, Pete Delaney (Beau Bridges), to have life-saving surgery. Neal accepts a job as surgical attending at Angels. Christa and Malaya treat a marathon runner and new single mother, Katie Miller (Annie Wersching), who is having lung issues.
17	17	"Love Hurts"	Constantine Makris	David Marshall Grant & Ryan McGarry	February 17, 2016	CB117	6.11
Christa and Grace deal with a teenager who claims to have been abused at a camp. Angus begins to take ADHD medication to remain focused, after it is revealed that he deliberately refused to aid Gordon after he removed the knife from his throat, causing Gordon's death. Leanne deals with a VIP patient who had embryos implanted in her without her husband's knowledge. Meanwhile, Christa feels at odds with Grace due to her past history with Neal.
18	18	"Blood Sport"	David Von Ancken	Michael Seitzman & Kayla Alpert	February 24, 2016	CB118	6.91
When the location of a presidential debate suffers an explosion, the ER must work under the scrutiny of the Secret Service to save both candidates and their families. Mario confronts Angus about his drug abuse, which in turn leads to Heather being caught by Campbell using his scripts to prescribe the Adderall. The love triangle between Neal, Christa, and Grace becomes more complex. Dr. Rorish asks Dr. Taylor for advice on how to cope with Jesse and the other nurses' impending strike over wages and the addition of more nurses to the staff.

=== Season 2 (2016–17) ===
No. overall	No. in season	Title	Directed by	Written by	Original release date	Prod. code	U.S. viewers (millions)
19	1	"Second Year"	Loni Peristere	Michael Seitzman	September 28, 2016	CB201	6.37
Col. Ethan Willis joins the team, bringing new techniques and technologies learned in the field of combat to the hospital; Willis and Mike take a helicopter to Malibu to help shark bite victims; Jesse welcomes new residents.
20	2	"Life and Limb"	Lee Rose	David Marshall Grant	October 5, 2016	CB202	5.87
Willis helps a young soccer player injured in a bus crash; a patient's hesitancy to disclose that she's transgender compromises the doctors' ability to diagnose her abdominal pain.
21	3	"Corporeal Form"	David Von Ancken	Corey Evett and Matthew Partney	October 12, 2016	CB203	5.99
Willis, Mario and Heather perform a radical operation on a maintenance worker stuck under a boiler that exploded; Angus' father tries to seize power of attorney over Mike, who remains in a coma.
22	4	"Demons and Angels"	Luis Prieto	Michael Brandon Guercio	October 26, 2016	CB204	5.67
On Halloween night, Willis, Noa and Elliott rush to the scene of a fire at a haunted theater, where Dr. Nolan and her boyfriend's son are trapped.
23	5	"Landslide"	David McWhirter	Jessica Ball	November 2, 2016	CB205	4.45
The doctors treat victims who were caught in a landslide; the entire ER is put at risk when children with measles are brought in.
24	6	"Hero Complex"	David Von Ancken	Kayla Alpert	November 9, 2016	CB206	6.03
When a college student regains consciousness at the hospital, Malaya must tell her that she has been raped; Willis and Campbell are at odds when a terminally ill woman wants to end her life on her own terms.
25	7	"What Lies Beneath"	Constantine Makris	Zachary Lutsky	November 16, 2016	CB207	5.68
Willis and Campbell travel to a Russian submarine to treat a sailor who has been wounded in an explosion; the staff at Angels Memorial treats violent criminals who got injured during a prison riot.
26	8	"1.0 Bodies"	P. J. Pesce	Kristen Kim	November 23, 2016	CB208	6.18
The doctors treat the members of a cult who survived a mass suicide attempt; Mario wants to connect with his late father's girlfriend.
27	9	"Sleight of Hand"	Rob Greenlea	Julian Meiojas	November 30, 2016	CB209	5.92
Willis, Leanne and Jesse put their lives on the line to operate on an officer with an explosive bullet in her leg; Mario, Noa and Guthrie tend to a magician with breathing trouble.
28	10	"Ave Maria"	Kelly Makin	Kevin Hazzard	December 7, 2016	CB210	6.75
When Campbell's daughter is set to undergo surgery, he learns about Guthrie's Parkinson's symptoms and becomes furious. In the fallout, some doctors who knew are suspended and Jesse is fired.
29	11	"Exodus"	Jet Wilkinson	Corey Evett & Matthew Partney	December 21, 2016	CB211	5.98
After Jesse takes a new job at a plastic surgery clinic, he must take one of his patients to Angels when she crashes on the operating table. While in code black, the hospital loses power and the backup generators do not work, as they are still under repair following the boiler room explosion (S.2, Ep.3). While the patients are evacuated to an urgent care facility, Pinkney and Dixon must deliver a baby in the elevator.
30	12	"One in a Million"	Rob Bailey	David Marshall Grant & Jessica Ball	January 4, 2017	CB212	5.98
Defying Campbell's orders, Leanne uses the hospital helicopter to reunite a family one last time; Willis and Noa find a cellphone app to help them communicate with an autistic girl.
31	13	"Unfinished Business"	David Von Ancken	Michael Seitzman	January 11, 2017	CB213	6.33
While taking on a new role as the hospital chaplain, Guthrie considers undergoing a risky surgery to treat his Parkinson's; victims of an apartment fire arrive at Angels Memorial Hospital.
32	14	"Vertigo"	Carol Banker	Kayla Alpert & Michael Brandon Guercio	January 25, 2017	CB214	5.68
Ethan and Mario are asked to attend to two injured construction workers who are trapped on a crane platform 40 stories in the air. Meanwhile, the Angels' staff tends to victims and perpetrators of a school prank gone horribly wrong.
33	15	"The Devil's Workshop"	David Von Ancken	Corey Evett & Matthew Partney	February 1, 2017	CB215	6.80
The ER is quarantined when a viral outbreak jeopardizes the lives of the doctors and patients; a young girl whom Leanne bonded with a year ago when she lost her father returns to Angels Memorial.
34	16	"Fallen Angels"	Michael Seitzman	Jessica Ball & Julian Meiojas	February 8, 2017	CB216	6.07
The doctors and the Center for Disease Control try to find an antidote to the deadly virus; Leanne makes a life-changing decision; Jesse welcomes a new batch of residents.

=== Season 3 (2018) ===
No. overall	No. in season	Title	Directed by	Written by	Original release date	Prod. code	U.S. viewers (millions)
35	1	"Third Year"	Rob Bowman	Michael Seitzman	April 25, 2018	CB301	5.64
Ethan rides along with Rox to help victims in a still-active police raid on a drug house. Victims later brought to the hospital include a nine-year-old with a bullet wound whose drug-addicted uncle brought her to the house, plus several officers who were exposed to fentanyl. Later, new intern Pepper is exposed to fentanyl at the hospital. Meanwhile, Dr. Campbell has Angus assist on a surgery, leading him to offer Angus a surgical residency position. Also, Mario has difficulty getting over his personal feelings for Noa when the two disagree on a diagnosis.
36	2	"Better Angels"	P. J. Pesce	David Marshall Grant	May 2, 2018	CB302	5.17
A patient appears to be psychic, but Mario insists her visions are due to a brain tumor that needs to be removed. Noa empathizes with a 39-year-old ballet dancer who is in for surgery, knowing that the clock is ticking on his career. Meanwhile, Ethan performs a daring underwater rescue of a young woman from a submerged vehicle, earning him the ire of Rox. It is revealed that the passenger who escaped from the car is a Congressman and the young woman is his intern with whom he was having an affair. When the woman revives, she says the Congressman left her behind to die.
37	3	"La Familia"	Michael Schultz	Barbie Kligman	May 9, 2018	CB303	5.03
Jesse's brother Jose is taken to Angels after an accident. Although the team is able to save him from his injuries, they discover he has congestive heart failure and won't live for long. Mario and Noa treat an engaged couple who are both badly injured from a fight that took place at a baseball game. Leanne tries to define her relationship with Ariel, while Ethan opens up to Rox about his brother when she finds a memorial flag in his home.
38	4	"The Same as Air"	Diana Valentine	Corey Evett & Matthew Partney	May 16, 2018	CB304	5.95
Elliot doubts his ability as a doctor when he’s sued for his role in the death of a SWAT officer. Also, Willis and Rox arrive at a road rage accident resulting in multiple serious injuries, and Leanne discovers Ariel on an ice cream “date” with Max, a young patient at the hospital.
39	5	"Cabin Pressure"	Randy Zisk	Mike Weiss	May 30, 2018	CB305	6.38
Over the radio, Leanne and Jesse talk a young girl through how to use the supplies on board a small plane to build a makeshift defibrillator when her mom, the pilot, loses consciousness. Also, Rox and Willis are taken hostage at gunpoint while on their way to meet the plane at the landing site. Julitta Scheel, Marcia Gay Harden's daughter, stars as Ruby Harris, the young girl on the plane.
40	6	"Hell's Heart"	Larry Shaw	Eduardo Javier Canto & Ryan Maldonado	May 30, 2018	CB306	6.28
Willis and Rox are called to the scene of a wildfire in the mountains of Los Angeles to tend to the injured firefighters, and they choose to stay to look for a missing young boy who was separated from his father in the chaos.
41	7	"Step Up"	Ed Ornelas	Jessica Ball	June 6, 2018	CB307	5.67
Rox decides to make amends with her former step coach when she arrives to Angels Memorial with the local high school step team after a pyramid stunt goes wrong. Also, Noa pleads with Leanne and Campbell to try any other method before performing an emergency hysterectomy on a young teenage girl experiencing complications after giving birth.
42	8	"Home Stays Home"	Lin Oeding	Rebecca Cutter	June 13, 2018	CB308	6.18
Mario joins Rox and Willis on the scene of a boat crash and, in Center Stage, Leanne works to save a brother and sister who drank boiling water through a straw as part of a challenge. Also, Max's father tells Leanne to keep Ariel away from his son after he finds them kissing.
43	9	"Only Human"	Doug Hannah	David Marshall Grant	June 20, 2018	CB309	5.70
Max is brought to Angels Memorial with breathing difficulty and Ariel tells him she loves him. Also, Rox accompanies Willis and Martin to the funeral of an army buddy of Willis' brother, and Willis decides to get to the bottom of what happened to his brother's unit.
44	10	"Change of Heart"	Jennifer Lynch	Barbie Kligman	June 27, 2018	CB310	5.74
Elliot fears the worst after hearing the emotional testimony by Detective Gomez's wife at his malpractice trial, but hopes footage Diego shot for his documentary will change her mind. Also, Rox attempts to connect with Willis but he pushes her away, and Leanne attempts to comfort Ariel in the wake of a devastating loss.
45	11	"One of Our Own"	Nicole Rubio	Corey Evett & Matthew Partney	July 4, 2018	CB311	4.80
While rescuing an injured firefighter, Rox is hit by a drunk driver and rushed to Angels Memorial. Willis begins to realize his feelings for Rox and goes to great lengths to help her. Also, Leanne is excited to tell Ariel good news about her adoption.
46	12	"As Night Comes and I'm Breathing"	Thomas J. Wright	Jessica Ball	July 11, 2018	CB312	5.72
Willis continues to tend to Rox's medical needs in San Diego and Leanne and Max's father go searching for Ariel. Also, when Noa reveals to Mario she wants to take a job offer in Philadelphia, and Campbell offers Mario the attending position at Angels, they realize their career choices will mean ending their relationship.
47	13	"The Business of Saving Lives"	Rob Bowman	Mike Weiss	July 18, 2018	CB313	5.37
Angels Memorial descends into chaos when a plane crashes into the 8th floor. Also, Noa has a car accident and it is up to Mario to save her life. Also, Willis admits to Rox that he needs her in his life and the doctors gather in court to support Leanne for her custody hearing.

== Ratings ==
Code Black : U.S. viewers per episode (millions)

Season	Episode number																		Average
Season	1	2	3	4	5	6	7	8	9	10	11	12	13	14	15	16	17	18	Average
1	8.58	6.83	6.96	7.13	5.96	6.44	6.90	6.59	7.45	8.50	8.38	6.66	7.29	7.49	6.90	7.11	6.11	6.91	7.11
2	6.37	5.87	5.99	5.67	4.45	6.03	5.68	6.18	5.92	6.75	5.98	5.98	6.33	5.68	6.80	6.07	–		5.98
3	5.67	5.17	5.03	5.95	6.38	6.28	5.67	6.18	5.70	5.74	4.80	5.72	5.37	–					5.66

Audience measurement performed by Nielsen Media Research
