= Flesh and Bone (miniseries) =

American television miniseries

- Genre: Drama
- Created by: Moira Walley-Beckett
- Starring: Sarah Hay; Ben Daniels; Emily Tyra; Irina Dvorovenko; Damon Herriman; Josh Helman; Raychel Diane Weiner; Sascha Radetsky; Marina Benedict; Karell Williams
- Opening theme: "Obsession" performed by Karen O
- Composers: Dave Porter (score); Adam Crystal (ballet composer)
- Country of origin: United States
- Original language: English
- No. of episodes: 8

Production
- Executive producers: Moira Walley-Beckett; John Melfi; Lawrence Bender; Kevin Brown
- Producer: Donna E. Bloom
- Production location: New York City
- Cinematography: Adam Arkapaw; Terry Stacey
- Editors: Michelle Tesoro; Carole Kravetz Aykanian; Andy Keir; Meg Reticker
- Running time: 60 minutes
- Production companies: Pelican Ballet; Bender Brown

Original release
- Network: Starz
- Release: November 8 – December 27, 2015

Flesh and Bone is an American drama television miniseries created by Moira Walley-Beckett. It premiered on November 8, 2015, on the American cable television network Starz. Ethan Stiefel was a consultant and choreographer on the series.

== Plot ==
The founder and temperamental artistic director of the American Ballet Company, Paul Grayson (Ben Daniels), is determined to make it rank among the world's best artistic institutions. As the company's aging prima ballerina, Kiira (Irina Dvorovenko) struggles with an injury, Grayson believes that the company's saving grace is Claire Robbins (Sarah Hay), a beautiful and talented ballet dancer with a troubled past, whose inner torment drives her in compelling, unforeseeable ways. The series explores the dysfunction and glamour of the ballet world.

== Cast ==
=== Main ===
- Sarah Hay as Claire Robbins, a beautiful and talented ballet dancer with a troubled past.
- Ben Daniels as Paul Grayson, an artistic director of the American Ballet Company.
- Emily Tyra as Mia Bialy, Claire's reluctant roommate who has an eating disorder.
- Irina Dvorovenko as Kiira, an aging prima ballerina struggling with an injury.
- Damon Herriman as Romeo, a homeless man who lives under Claire's building.
- Josh Helman as Bryan Robbins, Claire's incestuous brother and a former Marine.
- Raychel Diane Weiner as Daphne Kensington, an ambitious New Yorker from a privileged background.
- Marina Benedict as Toni Cannava, The American Ballet Company's transcendent new choreographer.
- Tina Benko as Jessica, the manager of the American Ballet Company.
- Sascha Radetsky as Ross, a womanizing principal dancer.
- Karell Williams as Trey, a struggling ballet dancer.

=== Supporting ===
- Tovah Feldshuh as Ivana, a ballet instructor.
- John Allee as Pasha, the ballet company's piano player.
- Patrick Page as Sergei Zelenkov.
- Vanessa Aspillaga as Monica, the assistant company manager of the American Ballet Company.
- Carling Talcott as Ashley.
- Nadezhda Vostrikov as Patrice, a jealous ballet dancer in the company.

== Episodes ==
Starz released the first episode online on November 2, 2015, and the remaining episodes were made available on November 8, 2015, through Starz's On Demand channel in addition to the channel's weekly sequential airing of episodes.

| No. | Title | Directed by | Written by | Original release date | US viewers (millions) |
|---|---|---|---|---|---|
| 1 | "Bulling Through" | David Michôd | Moira Walley-Beckett | November 8, 2015 | 0.190 |
| 2 | "Cannon Fodder" | Joshua Marston | Moira Walley-Beckett | November 15, 2015 | 0.147 |
| 3 | "Reconnaissance" | Stefan Schwartz | Adam Rapp | November 22, 2015 | 0.130 |
| 4 | "Boogie Dark" | Nelson McCormick | David Wiener | November 29, 2015 | 0.124 |
| 5 | "M.I.A." | Adam Davidson | Jami O'Brien | December 6, 2015 | 0.122 |
| 6 | "F.U.B.A.R." | Sam Miller | Adam Rapp | December 13, 2015 | 0.073 |
| 7 | "Full Dress" | Alik Sakharov | Bronwyn Garrity | December 20, 2015 | 0.116 |
| 8 | "Scorched Earth" | Alik Sakharov | Moira Walley-Beckett | December 27, 2015 | 0.093 |

== Reception ==
Flesh and Bone received mixed to positive reviews. Rotten Tomatoes gives a "Fresh" score of 60%, which is an average rating of 5.9 out of 10, sampled from 35 reviews. The consensus reads: "Its nuanced female relationships makes Flesh and Bone a realistic portrayal of a professional ballet company, though it suffers from a lack of levity." On another review aggregator, Metacritic, the miniseries holds a score of 52 out of 100, calculated from 19 critics, signifying "mixed or average reviews". For the 2016 Writers Guild of America Awards, the series was nominated for Long Form Original. For the 73rd Golden Globe Awards, the series was nominated for Best Limited Series or Motion Picture Made for Television and Sarah Hay for Best Actress in a Limited Series or Motion Picture Made for Television.

== Awards and nominations ==
| Year | Award | Category | Recipient(s) | Result | Ref. |
|---|---|---|---|---|---|
| 2016 | Golden Globe Award | Best Actress – Miniseries or Television Film | Sarah Hay | Nominated | |
| 2016 | Golden Globe Award | Best Television Limited Series or Motion Picture Made for Television | Producers Lawrence Bender, Donna Bloom, Kevin Brown, John Melfi, Tiffany Parker, Lori Slomka and Moira Walley-Beckett | Nominated | |
| 2016 | Satellite Award | Best Actress – Miniseries or Television Film | Sarah Hay | Won | |
| 2016 | Satellite Award | Best Miniseries | Flesh and Bone/Starz | Won | |
| 2016 | Critics' Choice Television Award | Best Actress in a Movie/Miniseries | Sarah Hay | Nominated | |
| 2016 | Women's Image Network Awards | Actress Made For Television Movie/Miniseries | Sarah Hay | Nominated | |
| 2016 | SXSW Film Festival | Excellence in Title Design Finalists | Angus Wall | Nominated | |
| 2016 | Writers Guild of America Awards | Long Form – Original | Writers Bronwyn Garrity, Jami O’Brien, Adam Rapp, Moira Walley-Beckett and David Wiener | Nominated | |
| 2016 | Gracie Allen Awards | Outstanding Limited Series or Made for Television Movie | Starz Entertainment | Won | |
