= John Allee =

American actor, singer and songwriter

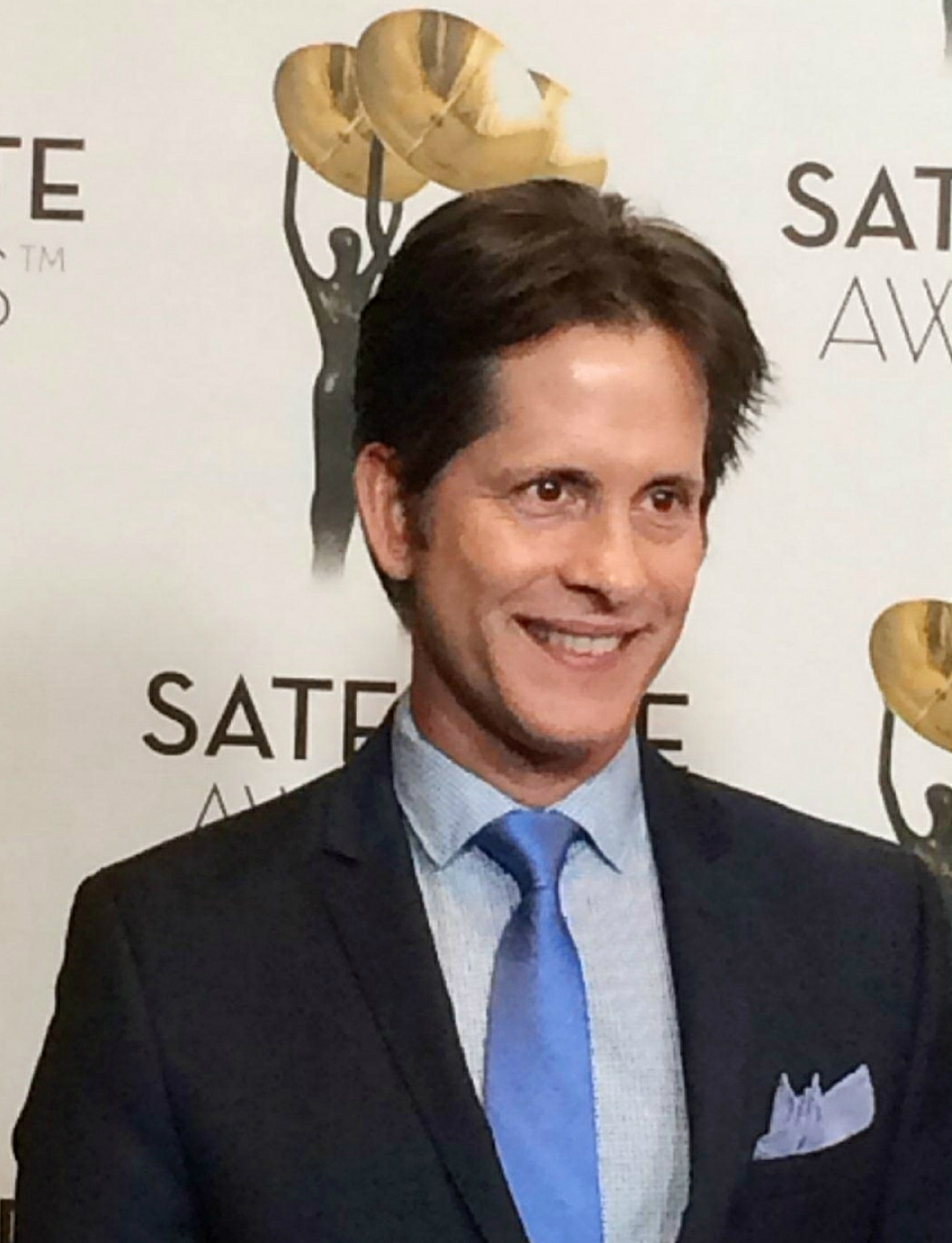
- Allee at the 2016 Satellite Awards in Los Angeles, December 2017.
- Born: John Nye Allee; September 11, 1963 (age 62); Bronxville, New York, U.S.
- Other name: Johnnye Allee
- Occupations: Actor, Songwriter
- Years active: 1979–present
- Known for: Flesh and Bone
- Spouse: Kathleen Ross-Allee (m. 1992)

John Allee (born September 11, 1963) is an American actor, singer and songwriter, best known for playing the role of Pasha on the Golden Globe nominated Starz limited series Flesh and Bone (2015), and for his stage work in Los Angeles, CA.

== Career ==
=== Acting ===
Allee started acting at an early age. In 1980, while still in high school, he appeared in Los Angeles in the West Coast premiere of Elizabeth Swados' Runaways.. The following year he created the role of Douglas Spaulding in Dandelion Wine, Ray Bradbury's own musical adaptation of his novel (Colony Theatre), and appeared in a featured "bit" alongside comedy legend Sid Caesar in the movie Grease 2. Soon after, he was cast as Teen Charlie Chaplin in Anthony Newley's pre-Broadway musical Chaplin (written with Stanley Ralph Ross), in which Newley played the silent film icon as an older man. Chaplin was directed by choreographer Michael Smuin and closed after its out of town try-out at the Dorothy Chandler Pavilion, having lost $4 million on the road.

Allee's work in the theatre also includes playing Thomas Cromwell in A Man for All Seasons, Banjo in The Man Who Came to Dinner, 33 Variations (winner of the 2018 Ovation Award for Best Production of a Play in an Intimate Theatre and a 2018 Los Angeles Drama Critics Circle Award nominee for Best Production)(all at Actors Co-op), Cloud 9 (winner of the 2017 Los Angeles Drama Critics Circle Award for Best Production), Uncle Vanya starring Arye Gross, The Crucible, Peace in Our Time (winner of the 2012 Ovation Award for Best Production of a Play in an Intimate Theatre), The Malcontent (all at Antaeus Theatre Company), the U.S. premiere of Miro Gavran's My Wife's Husband (Little Fish Theatre), Seymour in Little Shop of Horrors (Arizona Theatre Company), Lee Harvey Oswald in the West Coast premiere of Stephen Sondheim and John Weidman's Assassins opposite Patrick Cassidy as John Wilkes Booth (Los Angeles Theatre Center), Alone Together starring Nancy Dussault (Pasadena Playhouse), Puck in Benjamin Britten's opera A Midsummer Night's Dream directed two times by Gordon Davidson (Los Angeles Opera, (1988 and again in 1992), and two other productions of the same directed by John Copley, conducted by John Mauceri, with Sylvia McNair as Tytania, Brian Asawa as Oberon, and Donald Adams as Bottom (San Francisco Opera and Houston Grand Opera), and One Thousand Cranes (Mark Taper Forum).

Allee appeared on television in the recurring role of Pasha on the Golden Globe Awards nominated Starz limited series Flesh and Bone (2015) from Breaking Bad writer and executive producer Moira Walley-Beckett.

=== Music ===
Allee is also a songwriter, recording artist, and composer of musical plays, including an adaptation of Kin Platt's The Boy Who Could Make Himself Disappear and Poet's Garden (both written with Gary Matanky), the latter of which premiered in Los Angeles at The Matrix Theatre in 2001 under the direction of Michael Michetti.

Allee has performed in cabarets, clubs, and theatres and has had his music featured Off-Broadway, in regional theatre, and on national TV, including Candid Camera.

Recording under the "nom-de-pop," Johnnye Allee, he released his first CD in 2007, Unless it Isn't, a collection of folk-pop/roots-rock originals which American Songwriter magazine called "a stunning suite of songs." He released a follow-up album, Expect Delays, in 2016. A third album, Bardfly, was released in 2019, on which Allee adapted songs from the plays of William Shakespeare into a jazz vernacular. In July of 2023, following the release of his fourth studio album, Past Imperfect, he was the featured guest on the nationally syndicated radio show Jazz Inspired.

== Awards ==
Allee has received a variety of awards throughout his career for both acting and music, including the Los Angeles Drama Critics Circle Award for Best Ensemble for Cloud 9, an Ovation Award nomination for Best Acting Ensemble for 33 Variations, Robby Award nominations for Best Actor in a Musical (Dandelion Wine), Best Ensemble Performance (Cloud 9), Best Supporting Actor in a Drama (33 Variations), and Best Supporting Actor in a Comedy (The Man Who Came to Dinner), the ASCAP/Sammy Cahn Award for excellence in lyric writing, a Back Stage Garland Award for Musical Score for Poet's Garden, and he was a finalist for the American Academy of Arts and Letters' Richard Rodgers Award for Musical Theatre for The Boy Who Could Make Himself Disappear.
