= Black Code =

Black Code or Black Codes may refer to:

== Law ==
- Code Noir, or Black Code, slavery decree in 1685 France
- Black Codes (United States), discriminatory state and local laws passed after the Civil War in 1860s
- "Black code", another name for Jim Crow laws in 1960s

== Other ==
- Black Codes (From the Underground), a 1985 album by Wynton Marsalis
- Black (code), a diplomatic cypher system used by the U.S. prior to its entry into the Second World War
- Black Code (film), a Canadian documentary film
- Sometimes Black code is synonymous for Black bag operation

== See also ==
- Code Black (disambiguation)
