= Knuckleball (2018 film) =

2018 thriller film directed by Michael Peterson

- Film poster
- Directed by: Michael Peterson
- Written by: Kevin Cockle; Michael Peterson; Jordan Scott (story editor)
- Produced by: Julian Black Antelope; Kurtis David Harder; Lars Lehmann; Michael Peterson; Laurie Venning
- Starring: Michael Ironside; Munro Chambers; Luca Villacis; Kathleen Munroe; Chenier Hundal
- Cinematography: Jon Thomas
- Edited by: Rob Grant; Glenn Sakatch
- Music by: David Arcus; Michelle Osis
- Production company: 775 Media Corp
- Distributed by: Freestyle Digital Media; Front Row Filmed Entertainment
- Release date: March 3, 2018 (Cinequest Film & VR Festival)
- Running time: 89 minutes
- Country: Canada
- Language: English

Knuckleball is a 2018 Canadian thriller film written, directed and co-produced by Michael Peterson. The movie was released on March 3, 2018, at the Cinequest Film & VR Festival.

== Premise ==
Henry, a 12-year-old boy, discovers his family's dark legacy when his mysterious grandfather suddenly dies leaving him alone on an isolated farm.

== Cast ==
- Michael Ironside as Jacob
- Munro Chambers as Dixon
- Luca Villacis as Henry
- Kathleen Munroe as Mary
- Chenier Hundal as Paul

== Release ==
=== Reception ===
On review aggregator Rotten Tomatoes, Knuckleball has an approval rating of 83% based on 24 reviews. On Metacritic, another review aggregator which uses a weighted average, assigned the film a score of 55 out of 100 based on 5 critics, indicating "mixed or average reviews". Brad Wheeler from The Globe and Mail gave the movie 3 out of 4 starts, writing: "The Canadian-made creep-fest begins laboriously as co-writer/director Michael Peterson figures out how to rid the plot of any phones. (Every thrill-maker filmmaker has to deal with that pesky issue, but Peterson's methods are slower than a Macaulay Culkin growth-spurt.) Otherwise, Knuckleball does not flutter; its pace and tone is lean, mean and eerie."

Dennis Harvey, writing for Variety, stated: "Michael Peterson effectively earns suspension of disbelief with stark atmospherics, solid performances and a persuasive escalation of panic." Noel Murray of the Los Angeles Times called Knuckleball "effective" and said: "This is a tautly constructed exercise in suspense, set among striking-looking snowbound fields and farmhouses. It's a vivid slice-of-life, even before the literal slicing begins."

=== Accolades ===
Knuckleball won the 2019 AMPIA Awards in the category of "Best Screenwriter (Drama over 30 minutes)" and was nominated for the same award in the categories of "Best Dramatic Feature" and "Best Director (Drama over 30 minutes)".
