= Harpoon (2019 film) =

2019 Canadian film directed and written by Rob Grant

- Film poster
- Directed by: Rob Grant
- Written by: Rob Grant
- Produced by: Julian Black Antelope; Kurtis David Harder; Michael Peterson
- Starring: Munro Chambers; Emily Tyra; Christopher Gray
- Narrated by: Brett Gelman
- Cinematography: Charles Hamilton
- Edited by: Rob Grant
- Music by: Michelle Osis
- Production company: 775 Media Corp
- Release date: 24 January 2019 (Rotterdam)
- Running time: 82 minutes
- Country: Canada
- Language: English

Harpoon is a 2019 Canadian horror comedy film written and directed by Rob Grant. The film stars Munro Chambers, Emily Tyra, and Christopher Gray, and is about three best friends who become stranded on a yacht in the middle of the ocean. It premiered at the Rotterdam International Film Festival on January 24, 2019, and played at several film festivals, including the Calgary Underground Film Festival, where it won the audience award. It was theatrically released on October 4, 2019.

== Plot ==
Jonah, an unlucky, down and out twenty-something, is best friends with wealthy but violently unstable Richard. One morning Richard ambushes and brutally beats the unsuspecting Jonah, because he suspects that Jonah has slept with his girlfriend, Sasha. Sasha arrives and pulls Richard away, explaining that suspicious texts Richard found on her phone were actually her and Jonah planning to buy him a speargun for his birthday. Richard feels guilty and, to apologize, takes the two for a day trip on his yacht. With the tension apparently broken, the three begin relaxing on the boat. However, as Richard and Sasha talk, he realizes that she actually has been sleeping with Jonah. Richard, irate, aims his new speargun at Jonah, but Sasha hits him from behind. In the ensuing wild scuffle, Jonah's hand is shot with the speargun, the ship's radio is broken, and Jonah knocks out Richard.

At Jonah's suggestion, he and Sasha roll Richard off the boat, intending to make his death seem like an accident. Richard regains consciousness when he hits the water, and he explains that he has the keys to the yacht in his pocket. Richard agrees to come back on board after Jonah and Sasha throw all possible weapons overboard. Back on board, Richard tries to start the engine but discovers it is dead. In the ensuing panic-filled argument, Sasha says that Richard had an affair a year earlier that resulted in a pregnancy, with the woman being murdered shortly thereafter (the implication being that Richard killed her, which he denies).

The three discover they have very few supplies. Sasha, a nurse, explains that they will die in seven days from dehydration without water. As the days pass, Jonah's hand injury becomes severely infected. Sasha and Richard botch an attempt to amputate the arm, only managing to cut his biceps before stopping. The trio, desperately hungry and thirsty, agree that one of them must be cannibalized for the others to survive. Richard argues it should be Jonah, since he will die from his infection anyway. Jonah retorts that he knows Richard has continued having affairs despite his promises to Sasha. Richard angrily reveals that Jonah was the one who murdered the pregnant girl and Jonah confesses that he committed the murder to keep the three of them together.

The trio draw straws to determine who will be sacrificed. Sasha draws the shortest straw, but she is unable to kill herself, so Jonah and Richard draw straws again to determine who will have to kill her. Jonah draws the short straw this time. However, he lunges at Richard and tears out his throat with a broken bottle.

Jonah reveals to the horrified Sasha that when they were throwing weapons overboard at Richard's behest, Jonah also removed a fuse from the yacht's fuse box, causing the boat to be stranded. He has also hidden away food. Jonah explains that he did this to ensure that they could explain to authorities that they killed Richard to survive. Jonah feverishly suggests they run away together. Fearing for her life, Sasha acquiesces. Jonah, appeased, puts the fuse back, returning the boat to working order.

Later, as Jonah stands at the ship's stern, the enraged Sasha knocks him overboard, and he is chopped apart by the boat's propellers. Only Jonah's severed and infected arm is left floating on the sea.

Sasha goes to the wheel and pushes the throttle, but the force of acceleration throws her off the side of the boat. She curses as she sees the pilot-less boat race away, leaving her stranded in the ocean.

== Cast ==
- Munro Chambers as Jonah
- Christopher Gray as Richard
- Emily Tyra as Sasha
- Brett Gelman as Narrator
- Kurtis David Harder as Boat Castaway
- Rob Grant as Boat Castaway
- Michael Peterson as Boat Castaway
- Rob Spina as Boat Castaway
- Ron Webber as Boat Castaway

== Release ==
Harpoon had its world premiere at the Rotterdam International Film Festival on January 24, 2019. It was also shown at the Chattanooga and Calgary Underground Film Festivals, and won the audience award at the latter. It was theatrically released on October 4, 2019.

== Reception ==
The review aggregator website Rotten Tomatoes reports a 97% approval rating with an average score of 7.4/10, based on 61 reviews. The website's consensus reads, "A B-movie with an A-level commitment to entertain, Harpoon should hit the target with horror fans in the mood for gory, darkly humorous antics on the open water." On Metacritic, the film achieved an average score of 65 out of 100, based on 6 reviews.

== See also ==
- List of Canadian films of 2019
- List of horror films of 2019
