= Munro Chambers =

Canadian actor (born 1990)

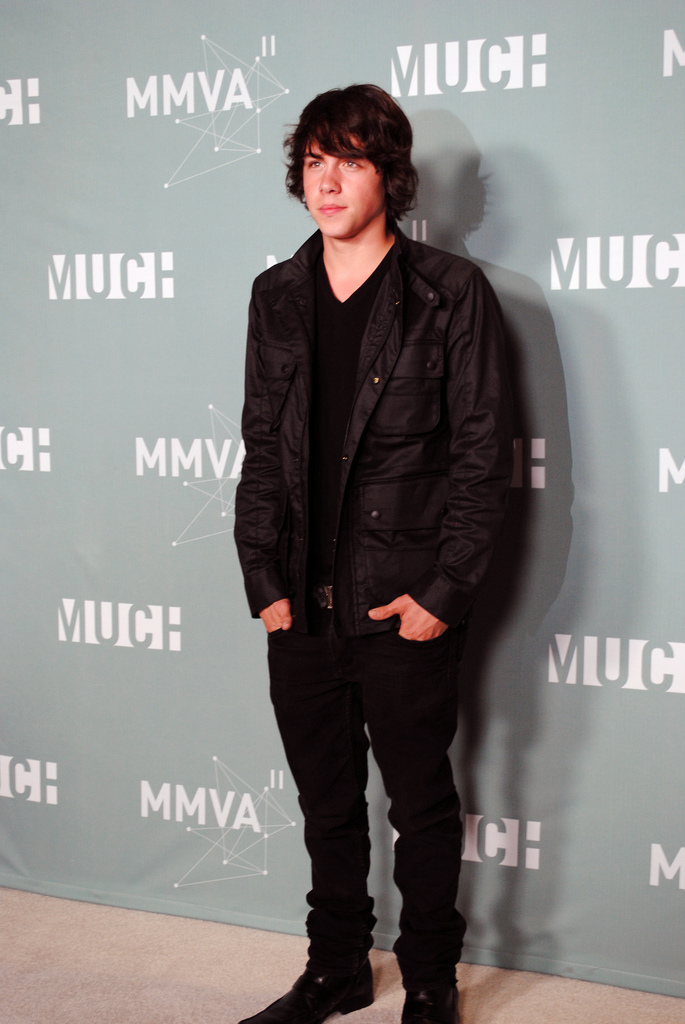
- Chambers at the 2011 MuchMusic Video Awards
- Born: Munro Kenneth Chambers; July 29, 1990 (age 35); Ajax, Ontario, Canada
- Occupation: Actor
- Years active: 1998–present
- Spouse: Megan Clara (m. 2023)
- Relatives: Colin Mochrie (uncle); Debra McGrath (aunt)

Munro Kenneth Chambers (born July 29, 1990) is a Canadian actor who is best known for his roles as Wilder on The Latest Buzz (2007–2010), Elijah "Eli" Goldsworthy on Degrassi (2010–2015), Frankie Chandler on Lockwood (2016–present) and Nate on Second Jen (2016).

== Career ==
Chambers made his television debut on Little Men as Rob Bhaer in 1998.

He appeared in a variety of shows and films before getting his big break in 2010 in the Canadian teen drama Degrassi: The Next Generation. His portrayal of Eli Goldsworthy, an artistic teen struggling with bipolar disorder, gained him a fan favorite status. He received a Best Performance in a Children's or Youth Program or Series nomination at the Canadian Screen Awards in 2014 for the role.

In 2015, Chambers starred in the post-apocalyptic superhero film Turbo Kid, alongside Laurence Leboeuf and Michael Ironside. The film would earn him a Best Actor win at the Victoria, TX Indie Film Fest.

In 2016, he played the romantic lead, country boy Charlie Bishop, in the film Country Crush.

Chambers played "the killer next door," Dixon in the Canadian thriller Knuckleball in 2018 with Ironside.

In 2019, he portrayed Jonah in Rob Grant's horror comedy Harpoon. The same year, he appeared in the survival film Riot Girls as Jeremy, with Paloma Kwiatkowski and Madison Iseman. Chambers and Kwiatkowski went on to play doppelgangers in the 2019 sci-fi thriller film Multiverse. His portrayal of Gerry would earn him a Best Actor nomination at the Berlin Sci-fi Filmfest.

In 2021, Chambers reunited virtually with his former Degrassi castmates at the ATX Television Festival for the show's 20th anniversary and to discuss the impact of the show.

== Personal life ==
Chambers has a twin brother, Thomas Chambers, who is also an actor.

Chambers is related to both Colin Mochrie and Debra McGrath. In a 2010 interview, he stated:

"I could say many things... my uncle, for one thing, is Colin Mochrie. He's been my inspiration getting into the industry. He's my uncle-in-law; his wife is my dad's cousin. My dad and his cousin, they were kind of like brother and sister growing up, so he’s my uncle by law. We have a good relationship."

While on Degrassi, Chambers worked with Free the Children. He and his castmates traveled to different countries to assist local communities in a variety of ways. Chambers expressed further gratitude for the program, stating that it helped him gain experiences of other cultures and religions.

== Filmography ==
=== Film ===
Year	Title	Role	Notes
2004	Godsend	Max Shaw	
2005	Bailey's Billion$	Max Rizzo	
2011	Beethoven's Christmas Adventure	Mason Cooper	Direct-to-video
2011	Prancer Returns		Stunts for Gavin Fink
2014	Ahead	Brandon	Short film; Writer
2015	Turbo Kid	The Kid	
2016	Country Crush	Charlie Bishop	
2016	Sadie's Last Days on Earth	Teddy	
2018	Knuckleball	Dixon	
2018	Hellmington	Brad Kovacs	
2019	Harpoon	Jonah	
2019	Riot Girls	Jeremy	
2019	Multiverse	Gerry	Also known as Entangled
2021	Taking the Fall	Tyler	
2021	The Retreat	Scott	
2022	The Protector		
TBA	Turbo Kid 2	The Kid	Pre-production
TBA	This Too Shall Pass		Post-production

=== Television ===
Year	Title	Role	Notes
1998–1999	Little Men	Rob Bhaer	20 episodes
2001	Doc	Brian Raines	Episode: "Karate Kid"
2003	A Wrinkle in Time	Sandy Murray	TV movie
2003	Good Fences	Billy	TV movie
2004	Still Game	Jack's grandson	Episode: "Holiday"
2005	Murder in the Hamptons	Greg Ammon	TV movie
2007–2010	The Latest Buzz	Wilder	Main role; 68 episodes
2010	Degrassi in India	Self	Documentary special
2010–2015	Degrassi	Eli Goldsworthy	Main role; 155 episodes
2011	Degrassi in Haiti	Self	Documentary special
2013	Cracked	Trey	Episode: "Spirited Away"
2014	The Divide	Noah	Episode: "The Ways Men Divide"
2015	Riftworld Chronicles	Wes	Miniseries
2016	The Stanley Dynamic	Rupert	Episode: "The Stanley Honour"
2016	Second Jen	Nate	6 episodes
2017	Ransom	Cameron Duspleis	Season 1, episode 7: "Regeneration"
2017	#VitalSignz	Sparrow	Producer; Episode: "The Adventures of Geriatric Man"
2017	Played	Noah	10 episodes
2019	Cardinal	Perry Dorn	2 episodes
2022	Murdoch Mysteries	Claude Cordier	Episode: "I Still Know What You Did Last Autumn"

=== Video games ===
Year	Title	Role	Notes
2020	Watch Dogs: Legion	Jackson Pearce	Bloodline DLC

== Awards and nominations ==
Year	Award	Category	Work	Result	Notes	Ref.
2014	Canadian Screen Awards	Best Performance in a Children's or Youth Program or Series	Degrassi: The Next Generations (Episode: "Ray of Light, Part 2")	Nominated		
2016	Victoria, TX Indie Film Fest	Best Actor	Turbo Kid	Won		
2019	Berlin Sci-fi Filmfest	Best Actor	Multiverse	Nominated		
