= Code Black (TV series) =

American medical drama television series (2015–2018)

- Genre: Medical drama
- Created by: Michael Seitzman
- Starring: Marcia Gay Harden; Raza Jaffrey; Bonnie Somerville; Melanie Chandra; William Allen Young; Harry Ford; Benjamin Hollingsworth; Luis Guzmán; Boris Kodjoe; Jillian Murray; Rob Lowe; Noah Gray-Cabey; Emily Tyra; Emily Alyn Lind; Moon Bloodgood
- Composer: Clinton Shorter
- Country of origin: United States
- Original language: English
- No. of seasons: 3
- No. of episodes: 47 (list of episodes)

Production
- Executive producers: Michael Seitzman; David Semel; Marti Noxon; Linda Goldstein-Knowlton; David Von Ancken; Molly Newman; David Marshall Grant; Brett Mahoney; Ryan McGarry
- Producers: Scott Printz; Steve Sassen
- Running time: 40–44 minutes
- Production companies: Michael Seitzman's Pictures (2015–17); Maniac Productions (2018); Tiny Pyro Productions; CBS Television Studios; ABC Studios

Original release
- Network: CBS
- Release: September 30, 2015 – July 18, 2018

Code Black is an American medical drama television series created by Michael Seitzman that premiered on CBS on September 30, 2015. It takes place in an overcrowded and understaffed emergency room in Los Angeles, California, and is based on a 2013 documentary film by Ryan McGarry. On May 16, 2016, the show was renewed for a 13-episode second season, which premiered on September 28, 2016. On November 14, 2016, CBS added three more episodes, to bring the total to 16.

On May 14, 2017, the series was renewed for a third season, which premiered on April 25, 2018. On May 24, 2018, CBS canceled the series after three seasons. The series finale aired on July 18, 2018.

== Plot ==
The show centers on the fictional Angels Memorial Hospital, where four first-year residents and their colleagues must tend to patients in an understaffed, busy emergency room that lacks sufficient resources.

== Episodes ==
Season	Episodes	Originally released	
Season	Episodes	First released	Last released
1	18	September 30, 2015	February 24, 2016
2	16	September 28, 2016	February 8, 2017
3	13	April 25, 2018	July 18, 2018

== Cast and characters ==
=== Main ===
- Marcia Gay Harden as Dr. Leanne Rorish, an ER attending physician, known to current and former resident doctors as "Daddy". Her husband and two children were killed after their car was hit by a drunk driver; this sometimes influences her medical decisions. Originally the ER's Residency Director, Leanne is promoted to Director of Emergency Medicine. She is replaced in this position by Dr. Campbell in "Second Year". In "Fallen Angels", Leanne is shown to have taken guardianship of a young orphan.
- Raza Jaffrey as Dr. Neal Hudson, an ER attending physician. A British-Indian former surgeon, his approach is quieter and more people-oriented, than his mentor Dr. Rorish. He connected with Christa during her first year of residency. In "Hail Mary", Hudson becomes a surgical attending, and is once again assigned to the ER (season 1).
- Bonnie Somerville as Dr. Christa Lorenson, a mature first-year resident. She was married with a son who died of brain cancer. Her experience and her divorce inspired her to attend medical school (season 1).
- Melanie Chandra as Dr. Malaya Pineda, a first-year resident (seasons 1–2). She went to medical school and did her internship at Angels Memorial, and is more familiar with the ER. She is a lesbian, who was once involved with a resident when she was a medical student.
- William Allen Young as Dr. Rollie Guthrie, an ER attending physician with a very nurturing style; he takes Angus under his wing in his first days in the ER. Guthrie's wife committed suicide, a death that strained his relationship with his son, a surgeon. During season 2, Guthrie is diagnosed with Parkinson's disease, and undergoes corrective neurological surgery to delay the onset of symptoms. Guthrie had a daughter who died from carbon monoxide poisoning while Guthrie tried to save his son from a similar death.
- Harry Ford as Dr. Angus Leighton, a first-year resident. His father is on the hospital board. He feels overshadowed by that and by the achievements of his older brother, a former resident, but slowly grows in confidence. In his third year he is encouraged to transfer and become a surgical resident.
- Benjamin Hollingsworth as Dr. Mario Savetti, a first-year resident. He grew up poor and sees emergency medicine as his way out. He worked as a bartender before medical school.
- Luis Guzmán as Jesse Salander, known as "Mama". A senior nurse who manages the residents, Jesse is tough but caring and supportive of the students. He and Dr. Rorish have a long-term, close friendship.
- Boris Kodjoe as Dr. Will Campbell, Chief of Surgery. In season 2 he is assigned as the new Chief of the combined Surgery and Emergency medicine department in order to save costs, causing strife between him and Rorish. Campbell has a disabled daughter (season 2–3; recurring in season 1).
- Jillian Murray as Dr. Heather Pinkney, a surgical resident who becomes involved with Mario.(season 2; recurring in season 1). He quickly ends it when he hears about her side relationship with Dr. Campbell. She gets in further trouble when it's revealed she's providing Angus with Adderall. When confronted by Campbell, she threatens to turn their past relationship into a sexual harassment case.
- Rob Lowe as Dr. Ethan Willis, an Army Medical Corps colonel attached to the prestigious Combat Casualty Care research program. He joins the ER staff at Angels Memorial for the remainder of his service contract after the Army pulls him from the battlefield in Afghanistan. Willis brings with him revolutionary military medical techniques, and builds a strong friendship with Dr. Rorish (seasons 2–3).
- Noah Gray-Cabey as Elliot Dixon, a first-year resident in the ER (season 2-3).
- Emily Tyra as Noa Kean, an ER resident and former dancer. She begins a relationship with Dr. Mario Savetti (season 3; recurring season 2)
- Emily Alyn Lind as Ariel Braeden (season 3; guest seasons 1–2)
- Moon Bloodgood as Rox Valenzuela, a Los Angeles Fire Department paramedic. Rox is Ethan's ride-along partner (season 3).

=== Recurring ===
- Angela Relucio as Risa Park R.N., a nurse in the Emergency Department.
- Ellia English as Isabel Mendez R.N., a nurse in the Emergency Department.
- Emily Nelson as Hannah Reynolds R.N., a nurse in the Emergency Department.
- Tommy Dewey as Dr. Mike Leighton, Angus' older brother, and a recently hired ER attending physician. He becomes the Director of the Residency Program following Rorish's promotion (seasons 1–2).
- Cress Williams as Dr. Cole Guthrie, a surgeon and Rollie's son. His relationship with his father is strained by his mother's suicide (seasons 1–2).

==== Season 1 ====
- Jeff Hephner as Dr. Ed Harbert, Angels Memorial Hospital CEO. He and Rorish clash frequently, but their mutual respect is obvious. He is dating Dr. Gina Perello.
- Kevin Dunn as Dr. Mark Taylor, the Director of the Emergency Department at Angels Memorial, who is on leave during an investigation into potential mismanagement.
- Shiri Appleby as Dr. Carla Niven, a former resident at Angels Memorial and Malaya's ex-girlfriend. She is diagnosed with leukemia while pregnant, and refuses treatment not wanting to harm the baby.
- Christina Vidal as Dr. Gina Perello, the replacement Director of the Emergency Department at Angels Memorial, who takes over when Dr. Taylor is put on leave.
- Gabrielle Carteris as Amy Wolowitz, R.N., a nurse in the Emergency Department.
- Meagan Good as Dr. Grace Adams, returns to the ER after volunteering in Haiti. She is Dr. Neal Hudson's ex-girlfriend.

==== Season 2 ====
- Nafessa Williams as Charlotte Piel, a new first-year resident in the ER who was formerly a popular teenaged actress.
- Kathleen Rose Perkins as Dr. Amanda Nolan, a psychiatrist at the hospital.

==== Season 3 ====
- Tyler Perez as Diego Avila, son of a hospital board member and a first-year resident. He drives the staff and patients crazy by filming them to make a documentary about the Angels ER.
- Alex Lange as Max, a young cancer patient with whom Ariel strikes up a friendship, which turns into young love.

== Production ==
=== Background ===
The series is based on the 2013 documentary Code Black by Dr. Ryan McGarry. The film showed the real life historic Los Angeles County General Hospital built in 1928, one of the worlds busiest hospitals, and the busiest trauma center in the United States. McGarry is an executive producer on the show. The series is set in the fictional Angels Memorial Hospital.

=== Development ===
On January 27, 2015, the show's pilot episode was greenlighted by CBS. On June 4, Brett Mahoney was appointed as executive producer for Code Black.

On October 23, 2015, CBS ordered six new scripts for Code Black. The following month, CBS ordered five additional episodes. CBS renewed the show for a second season in May 2016.

=== Casting ===
On February 17, 2015, Marcia Gay Harden was cast as Christa, a soccer mom who lost her son to cancer. On February 23, Melanie Chandra was cast as Malaya, a doctor beginning her residency. Maggie Grace was cast as Dr. Leanne Rorish, the lead of the show, the following day. On March 3, Luis Guzman was set to star as Jose Santiago, a senior nurse. The character's name was later changed to Jesse Salander. The following day, Raza Jaffrey was cast as Neal, and Ben Hollingsworth was set to star as Mario, a new resident. When Grace left the show before filming began, the role of Leanne was then given to Harden, and Bonnie Somerville was cast in Harden's role as Christa.

At the end of season 1, Somerville and Jaffrey departed the main cast, and recurring actors Jillian Murray and Boris Kodjoe joined the main cast, reprising their roles of Dr. Heather Pickney and Dr. Will Campbell respectively. Rob Lowe also joined the main cast as Colonel Ethan Willis, a Combat Casualty Care doctor assigned to Angels as part of a U.S. Army training program. In 2017, Moon Bloodgood was cast in the recurring role of paramedic Rox Valenzuela for the series' third season, and was subsequently promoted to series regular as of the third season's fourth episode. Bloodgood's casting followed the departures of both Chandra and Murray. Former recurring actors Emily Alyn Lind, Noah Gray-Cabey and Emily Tyra were also promoted to the main cast for the third season.

=== Filming ===
The pilot episode was filmed at the original Los Angeles County General Hospital facility, which has since been decommissioned and turned into mixed use office space.

Production designer Richard Toyon took extensive photographs of the hospital, and when the show went to series, he re-created the facility at the Walt Disney Studios in Burbank.

The show wanted to avoid the pristine white surfaces typical of conventional medical shows, and make the space look as real and lived-in as possible. The set was dirtied-up and aged with layers of dirt and wear-and-tear to reflect the decades of use as an overburdened emergency room. Toyan went so far as to spill fake blood all over the off-white floor tiles "and wiped it up so the color was in-between the tiles, and it had that heavily used sense." The sets were covered by a corkboard drop ceiling, to match the original location. This meant that instead of overhead lighting, the crew had to make do with practical on set lighting. They bought four vintage overhead operating room lights, and used the parts to make one working light. The use of digital cameras helped compensate for the lower light levels.

Much of the props and set dressing — including gurneys, beds, lights, X-ray holders, clipboards and textbooks from different eras — were bought as surplus from L.A. County General. The out-of-date health posters and misspelled signage were made in house.

Seitzman wanted to make the concept of "Code Black" literal and show it to audiences in a direct way, so the production team created a fictional machine they dubbed the Code-Black-ometer. It was made from old push-button consoles, and Chevy taillights, and it lights up with the increasingly urgent stats codes from green to yellow to red to black.

== International broadcast ==
In the UK, the show was shown on W with Season 3 premiered in late May 2018. The series originally aired in Australia on 7flix, before joining the 7plus catch-up streaming service. and moving to Disney+.

== Reception ==
Code Black has received mixed reviews from critics. On Rotten Tomatoes, the series has a rating of 50%, based on 42 reviews. The site's critical consensus reads: "While not reinventing the stethoscope, Code Black is an above-average medical drama, with appropriately theatrical storylines that make up for sometimes cheesy dialogue." On Metacritic, the series has a score of 53 out of 100, based on 26 critics, indicating "mixed or average reviews".

Mary McNamara of the Los Angeles Times wrote: "Overlaid with "Vice"-like shots of panic and bloody aftermath, Code Black wants the soap and sentiment of Grey's along with the broken-but-driven main character of House. Unfortunately, the writing lacks the conviction of either series, and so viewers are left with Harden, dancing just as fast as she can." Rob Lowman of the Los Angeles Daily News wrote: "Season 1 Review: It can never have the immediacy of Ryan McGarry's documentary about County/USC that inspired it, but the series does capture the film's spirit and that is a welcome change when it comes to medical dramas. Harden, as usual, provides a strong presence, which helps anchor the show, and Guzman is a plus for any series. Code Black is worth keeping an eye on."

=== Awards ===
Year	Award	Category	Recipients	Result	Ref.
2016	BMI Film & TV Awards	TV Music Award	Clinton Shorter	Won	
2016	Golden Maple Awards	Best Actor in a TV Series Broadcasted in the US	Ben Hollingsworth	Nominated	
2016	Imagen Awards	Best Primetime Television Program – Drama	Code Black	Nominated	
2016	Monte-Carlo Television Festival	Best TV Series – Drama	Code Black	Nominated	
2016	Monte-Carlo Television Festival	Best Actress in a TV Series – Drama	Marcia Gay Harden	Won	
2016	People's Choice Awards	Favorite New TV Drama	Code Black	Nominated	
2016	People's Choice Awards	Favorite Actress In A New TV Series	Marcia Gay Harden	Nominated	
2017	BMI Film & TV Awards	TV Music Award	Clinton Shorter	Won	
2018	NAMIC Vision Awards	Best Drama Series	Code Black	Nominated	

=== Ratings ===
Season	Timeslot (ET)	Episodes	Premiered		Ended		TV season	Rank	Viewers (in millions, including DVR)
Season	Timeslot (ET)	Episodes	Date	Viewers (in millions)	Date	Viewers (in millions)	TV season	Rank	Viewers (in millions, including DVR)
1	Wednesday 10:00 pm	18	September 30, 2015	8.58	February 24, 2016	6.91	2015–16	34	10.17
2	Wednesday 10:00 pm	16	September 28, 2016	6.37	February 8, 2017	6.07	2016–17	31	9.23
3	Wednesday 10:00 pm	13	April 25, 2018	5.64	July 18, 2018	5.37	2017–18	60	6.93

== Home media ==
Season	No. of episodes	DVD Release dates			Ref.
Season	No. of episodes	Region 1	Region 2	Region 4	Ref.
1	18	August 9, 2016	TBA	TBA	
2	16	September 19, 2017	TBA	TBA	
3	13	January 31, 2020	TBA	TBA	
