= Hugh Jackman: Back on Broadway =

2011–12 concert residency

- Concert by Hugh Jackman
- Poster
- Venue: Broadhurst Theatre (New York, NY)
- Date: 25 October 2011 – 1 January 2012

Hugh Jackman: Back on Broadway was a concert residency by Australian actor, singer, and producer Hugh Jackman. For this residency, Jackman performed Broadway and Hollywood musical numbers, backed by an 18-piece orchestra. Lighting design by Ken Billington.

The show was directed and choreographed by Warren Carlyle.

== Setlist ==
Act I

- Overture
- "Oh, What a Beautiful Morning"
- "One Night Only"
- Dance medley
- "L.O.V.E."
- "The Way You Look Tonight"
- New York medley
- "Fever"
- "Rock Island"
- "Soliloquy"

Act II

- "The Boy Next Door"
- Peter Allen medley
- "Tenterfield Saddler"
- Movie medley
- "Somewhere Over the Rainbow"
- "Mack the Knife"
- "It's So Hard to Say Goodbye"

== Reviews ==
"The impossibly talented, impossibly energetic Mr. Jackman is a glorious dinosaur among live entertainers of the 21st century: an honest-to-gosh old-fashioned matinee idol who connects to his audiences without a hint of contempt for them or for himself." — The New York Times

"Whatever else he does, Jackman brings joy to the stage. Comparisons are being offered to the deep impression made by a solo artist such as [Judy] Garland. But the rapturous emotional intensity that lingers is not what this performer provides. Garland left blood on the stage. Jackman leaves sweat, and a smile." — The Washington Post
