= Michael Seitzman =

Film director and producer

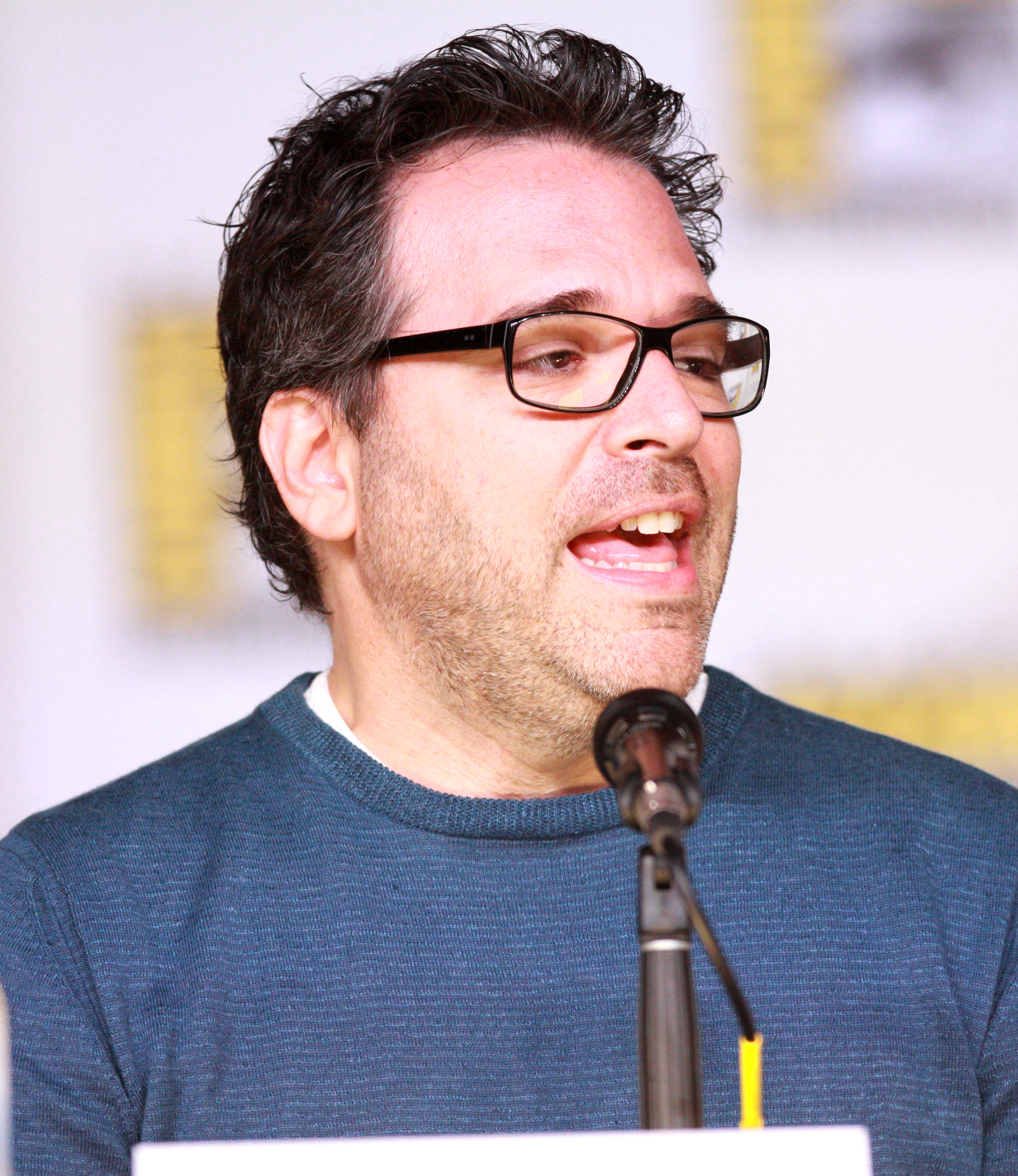
- Born: November 1, 1977 (age 48); Newark, New Jersey, USA
- Occupations: Writer, producer, film director
- Years active: 1997–present
- Spouse: Ellen Rapoport
- Website: maniac.la

Michael Seitzman (born November 1, 1977) is an American writer, producer and film director best known for film North Country. He launched his production company Maniac Productions in 2017. He most recently signed a TV deal with Blumhouse Productions.

== Filmography ==
=== Writer ===
- Farmer & Chase (1997)
- Here on Earth (2000)
- North Country (2005)
- House Rules (2009) (TV)
- Empire State (2009) (TV)
- The Sparrow (2012) (TV)
- Americana (2012) (TV series)
- Intelligence (2013)
- Code Black (2015)
- Quantico (2018)
- The Rainmaker (2025)
- Book of Enchantments (TBA)

=== Producer ===
- Farmer & Chase (1997)
- House Rules (2009) (TV)
- Empire State (2009) (TV)
- Americana (2012) (TV pilot)
- Intelligence (2013)
- Code Black (2015)
- Quantico (2018)
- The Rainmaker (2025)
- Book of Enchantments (TBA)
- Nego Boy (TBA)

=== Director ===
- Farmer & Chase (1997)
