= Ryan McGarry (physician) =

American physician

Ryan McGarry is an American writer, director, cinematographer and emergency physician who directed the documentary Code Black. Code Black is the basis for the TV series Code Black.

He also co-created and directed the Emmy nominated series Pandemic for Netflix.

== Education and training ==
McGarry grew up in Irvine, CA. He studied at the Pennsylvania State University where he obtained a B.A. with a major in English in 2005, then attended the University of Pittsburgh School of Medicine until 2009. As a med student at the University of Pittsburgh, McGarry participated in a four-week emergency medicine clerkship and research rotation at LA County/USC Medical Center. He did his residency in Emergency Medicine at the Keck School of Medicine of USC.

== Career ==
He worked as Clinical Instructor in Medicine at Joan and Sanford I. Weill Department of Medicine of Weill Cornell Medical College. He is currently a clinical assistant professor at the Keck School of Medicine at USC.
