= Costa Book Award for Novel =

Annual literary award for fictional books

The Costa Book Award for Novel, formerly known as the Whitbread Award (1971–2005), was an annual literary award for novels, as part of the Costa Book Awards.

The awards were dissolved in 2022.

== Recipients ==
Costa Books of the Year are distinguished with a blue ribbon. Award winners are listed in bold.

Costa Book Award for Novel winners and finalists
Year	Author	Title	Result	Ref.
1971	Gerda Charles	The Destiny Waltz	Winner	
1972	Susan Hill	The Bird of Night	Winner	
1973	Shiva Naipaul	The Chip-Chip Gatherers	Winner	
1974	Iris Murdoch	The Sacred and Profane Love Machine	Winner	
1975	William McIlvanney	Docherty	Winner	
1976	William Trevor	The Children of Dynmouth	Winner	
1977	Beryl Bainbridge	Injury Time	Winner	
1978	Paul Theroux	Picture Palace	Winner	
1979	Jennifer Johnston	The Old Jest	Winner	
1980	David Lodge	How Far Can You Go?	Winner	
1981	Maurice Leitch	Silver's City	Winner	
1982	John Wain	Young Shoulders	Winner	
1983	William Trevor	Fools of Fortune	Winner	
1984	Christopher Hope	Kruger's Alp	Winner	
1985	Peter Ackroyd	Hawksmoor	Winner	
1986	Kazuo Ishiguro	An Artist of the Floating World	Winner	
1987	Ian McEwan	The Child in Time	Winner	
1988	Salman Rushdie	The Satanic Verses	Winner	
1989	Lindsay Clarke	The Chymical Wedding	Winner	
1990	Nicholas Mosley	Hopeful Monsters	Winner	
1991	Jane Gardam	The Queen of the Tambourine	Winner	
1992	Alasdair Gray	Poor Things	Winner	
1993	Joan Brady	Theory of War	Winner	
1994	William Trevor	Felicia's Journey	Winner	
1995	Salman Rushdie	The Moor's Last Sigh	Winner	
1995	Martin Amis	The Information	Shortlist	
1995	Pat Barker	The Ghost Road	Shortlist	
1995	Justin Cartwright	In Every Face I Meet	Shortlist	
1995	Kazuo Ishiguro	The Unconsoled	Shortlist	
1996	Beryl Bainbridge	Every Man for Himself	Winner	
1996	Neil Bartlett	Mr Clive & Mr Page	Shortlist	
1996	J. G. Ballard	Cocaine Nights	Shortlist	
1996	Patrick McGrath	Asylum	Shortlist	
1996	Graham Swift	Last Orders	Shortlist	
1996	Fay Weldon	Worst Fears	Shortlist	
1997	Jim Crace	Quarantine	Winner	
1997	John Banville	The Untouchable	Shortlist	
1997	Bernard MacLaverty	Grace Notes	Shortlist	
1997	Ian McEwan	Enduring Love	Shortlist	
1997	Geoff Nicholson	Bleeding London	Shortlist	
1998	Justin Cartwright	Leading the Cheers	Winner	
1998	Ronan Bennett	the catastrophist	Shortlist	
1998	Barbara Trapido	The Travelling Hornplayer	Shortlist	
1999	Rose Tremain	Music and Silence	Winner	
1999	Jim Crace	Being Dead	Shortlist	
1999	Michael Frayn	Headlong	Shortlist	
1999	Joanne Harris	Chocolat	Shortlist	
2000	Matthew Kneale	English Passengers	Winner	
2000	Jill Dawson	Fred & Edie	Shortlist	
2000	Anne Enright	What Are You Like?	Shortlist	
2000	Kazuo Ishiguro	When We Were Orphans	Shortlist	
2000	Will Self	How the Dead Live	Shortlist	
2001	Patrick Neate	Twelve Bar Blues	Winner	
2001	Helen Dunmore	The Siege	Shortlist	
2001	Ian McEwan	Atonement	Shortlist	
2001	Andrew Miller	Oxygen	Shortlist	
2002	Michael Frayn	Spies	Winner	
2002	Justin Cartwright	White Lightning	Shortlist	
2002	Tim Lott	Rumours of a Hurricane	Shortlist	
2002	William Trevor	The Story of Lucy Gault	Shortlist	
2003	Mark Haddon	The Curious Incident of the Dog in the Night-Time	Winner	
2003	Rachel Cusk	The Lucky Ones	Shortlist	
2003	Shena Mackay	Heligoland	Shortlist	
2003	Barbara Trapido	Frankie & Stankie	Shortlist	
2004	Andrea Levy	Small Island	Winner	
2004	Kate Atkinson	Case Histories	Shortlist	
2004	Louis de Bernières	Birds Without Wings	Shortlist	
2004	Alan Hollinghurst	The Line of Beauty	Shortlist	
2004	Andrea Levy	Small Island	Shortlist	
2005	Ali Smith	The Accidental	Winner	
2005	Nick Hornby	A Long Way Down	Shortlist	
2005	Salman Rushdie	Shalimar the Clown	Shortlist	
2005	Christopher Wilson	The Ballad of Lee Cotton	Shortlist	
2006	William Boyd	Restless	Winner	
2006	Neil Griffiths	Saving Caravaggio	Shortlist	
2006	Mark Haddon	A Spot of Bother	Shortlist	
2006	David Mitchell	Black Swan Green	Shortlist	
2007	A.L. Kennedy	Day	Winner	
2007	Neil Bartlett	Skin Lane	Shortlist	
2007	Rupert Thomson	Death of a Murderer	Shortlist	
2007	Rose Tremain	The Road Home	Shortlist	
2008	Sebastian Barry	The Secret Scripture	Winner	
2008	Chris Cleave	The Other Hand	Shortlist	
2008	Louis de Bernières	A Partisan's Daughter	Shortlist	
2008	Patrick McGrath	Trauma	Shortlist	
2009	Colm Tóibin	Brooklyn	Winner	
2009	Penelope Lively	Family Album	Shortlist	
2009	Hilary Mantel	Wolf Hall	Shortlist	
2009	Christopher Nicholson	The Elephant Keeper	Shortlist	
2010	Maggie O'Farrell	The Hand That First Held Mine	Winner	
2010	Louise Doughty	Whatever You Love	Shortlist	
2010	Nigel Farndale	The Blasphemer	Shortlist	
2010	Paul Murray	Skippy Dies	Shortlist	
2011	Andrew Miller	Pure	Winner	
2011	Julian Barnes	The Sense of an Ending	Shortlist	
2011	John Burnside	A Summer of Drowning	Shortlist	
2011	Louisa Young	My Dear I Wanted to Tell You	Shortlist	
2012	Hilary Mantel	Bring Up the Bodies	Winner	
2012	Stephen May	Life! Death! Prizes!	Shortlist	
2012	James Meek	The Heart Broke In	Shortlist	
2012	Joff Winterhart	Days of the Bagnold Summer	Shortlist	
2013	Kate Atkinson	Life after Life	Winner	
2013	Bernardine Bishop	Unexpected Lessons in Love	Shortlist	
2013	Maggie O'Farrell	Instructions for a Heatwave	Shortlist	
2013	Evie Wyld	All the Birds, Singing	Shortlist	
2014	Ali Smith	How to Be Both	Winner	
2014	Neel Mukherjee	The Lives of Others	Shortlist	
2014	Monique Roffey	House of Ashes	Shortlist	
2014	Colm Tóibín	Nora Webster	Shortlist	
2015	Kate Atkinson	A God in Ruins	Winner	
2015	Anne Enright	The Green Road	Shortlist	
2015	Patrick Gale	A Place Called Winter	Shortlist	
2015	Melissa Harrison	At Hawthorn Time	Shortlist	
2016	Sebastian Barry	Days Without End	Winner	
2016	Maggie O'Farrell	This Must Be the Place	Shortlist	
2016	Sarah Perry	The Essex Serpent	Shortlist	
2016	Rose Tremain	The Gustav Sonata	Shortlist	
2017	Jon McGregor	Reservoir 13	Winner	
2017	Stef Penney	Under a Pole Star	Shortlist	
2017	Kamila Shamsie	Home Fire	Shortlist	
2017	Sarah Winman	Tin Man	Shortlist	
2018	Sally Rooney	Normal People	Winner	
2018	Pat Barker	The Silence of the Girls	Shortlist	
2018	Tom Rachman	The Italian Teacher	Shortlist	
2018	Donal Ryan	From a Low and Quiet Sea	Shortlist	
2019	Jonathan Coe	Middle England	Winner	
2019	Sophie Hardach	Confession with Blue Horses	Shortlist	
2019	Rowan Hisayo Buchanan	Starling Days	Shortlist	
2019	Joseph O'Connor	Shadowplay	Shortlist	
2020	Monique Roffey	The Mermaid of Black Conch	Winner	
2020	Susanna Clarke	Piranesi	Shortlist	
2020	Tim Finch	Peace Talks	Shortlist	
2020	Denise Mina	The Less Dead	Shortlist	
2021	Claire Fuller	Unsettled Ground	Winner	
2021	Jessie Greengrass	The High House	Shortlist	
2021	Nadifa Mohamed	The Fortune Men	Shortlist	
2021	Elif Shafak	The Island of Missing Trees	Shortlist	

== See also ==
- Costa Book Award for Biography
- Costa Book Award for Children's Books
- Costa Book Award for First Novel
- Costa Book Award for Poetry
- Costa Book Award for Short Story
- Costa Book Awards
