= Case Histories =

Novel by Kate Atkinson

- First edition cover
- Author: Kate Atkinson
- Language: English
- Series: Jackson Brodie
- Genre: Crime fiction
- Publisher: Doubleday
- Publication date: 2004
- Publication place: United Kingdom
- Media type: Print
- Pages: 304
- ISBN: 978-0-385-60799-5
- OCLC: 491944628
- Followed by: One Good Turn (2006)

Case Histories (2004) is a detective novel by British author Kate Atkinson and is set in Cambridge, England. It introduces Jackson Brodie, a former police inspector and now private investigator. The plot revolves around three seemingly unconnected family tragedies – the disappearance of a three-year-old girl from a garden; the murder of a husband by his wife with an axe; and the apparently motiveless murder of a solicitor's daughter. Kate Atkinson has since published five additional novels in the Jackson Brodie series: One Good Turn (2006), When Will There Be Good News? (2008), Started Early, Took My Dog (2010), Big Sky (2019) and Death at the Sign of the Rook (2024).

== Plot ==
'Case Histories' tells the story of Jackson Brodie, a private investigator who tries to find out the truth of three cases.

The first case presented is that of Olivia, who in 1970 disappeared while camping in her back garden overnight with her sister, Amelia. Now in their mid 40s, Amelia and sister Julia return to their father Victor's house to care for him in his final days and then organise his funeral. They inform the other surviving sister, Sylvia, who is now living as a nun named Sister Mary Luke in a convent. While clearing out his house, Julia discovers Blue Mouse, Olivia's stuffed mouse toy which she had with her the night she disappeared, in their father's study. This prompts them to contact Jackson.

The second case involves Theo, a morbidly obese, middle-aged man who is unable to move on from his beloved daughter Laura's seemingly random murder in 1994. She was 18 and had just began working as an assistant at Theo's law practice for the summer when a mysterious man in a yellow golfing vest came into the building and fatally stabbed her. In the present day, Theo compulsively walks to the building, now converted to a beauty therapy parlour, every year on the anniversary of the murder, and decides to enter it that day to get a closer look of the boardroom where Laura was murdered. Bringing so many difficult feelings to the forefront again, he decides to enlist the help of Jackson so he can finally have answers.

The third case revolves around Michelle, who in 1979 murdered her husband with an axe. Michelle, who may have already had psychopathic tendencies as a result of a dysfunctional upbringing, had also been under extreme stress, only being eighteen years old with a new baby, Tanya, whom she had no attachment to, while living without many basic utilities (such as hot water) in an isolated, rural area. That day, her husband had walked in and managed to wake Tanya just after she had finally gone to sleep, sending Michelle over the edge. Her sister, Shirley, visited a short while later and called the police, where the baby was taken into care and Michelle was taken to trial and declared insane. She later changed her legal name to Caroline and moved to a remote village where she currently works as headmistress for the local primary school, but otherwise has to live a secretive existence.

Jackson attends Victor's funeral with the sisters and reluctantly spends more time with them, and they all grow more convinced Victor might have been depraved enough to kill Olivia, as it's also revealed he sexually abused Sylvia and tried to sexually abuse Julia occasionally. Interviewing Binky Rain, the sisters' old, senile next-door neighbour also doesn't produce any results.

Meanwhile, Theo is convinced Laura's killer had originally targeted him and had killed Laura as the next alternative when he wasn't there. However, after combing through every one of Theo's ex-client folders (mostly women fleeing domestic abuse), Jackson is unable to find anyone whose partners may have held a grudge against him. At Theo's insistence, Jackson also arranges interviews with Laura's former friends from sixth form, where he learns from one previously close friend, Emma, that their science teacher, Stan Jessop, may have had an unprofessional relationship with Laura. Throughout this distressing time, Theo finds some paternal comfort in giving money to a young homeless woman, Lily-Rose, whom he walks past each day, and interacting with Jackson's eight-year-old daughter Marlee, who has to accompany him at work.

Shirley comes in to book an appointment with Jackson, as she wants to reconnect with her niece. Meanwhile, Jackson and Marlee visit Sylvia in the convent and present Blue Mouse to her, but she insists she still has no idea what happened that night. Jackson talks with Shirley, who recounts the day her brother-in-law was murdered, but Jackson is suspicious she's lying. Jackson's personal life begins to deteriorate as his work on the cases continues; he's attacked, seemingly at random, someone drains the brake fluid from his car, and he feels he is being followed. Coupled with his conflicts with his ex-wife, Jackson starts to become paranoid, and more convinced that the cases he's working on are connected.

While returning from a visit to Laura's grave, Theo has a bad asthma attack and is narrowly saved from dying by Julia and Lily-Rose who had alerted her, and he is taken to hospital. Lily-Rose comforts him as he recovers and he resolves to become healthier. Jackson contacts Kim, Stan Jessop's first wife, who recognises the man with the yellow golfing sweater as her next door neighbour when she was still with Stan, remarking that he was very creepy. It's revealed later that he was in fact the person who murdered Laura after briefly becoming infatuated with her.

Binky Rain dies and is found in her garden by the sisters. Amelia feels strange in her garden. Later that night, the stress of possibly never finding Olivia and her loneliness causes her to overdose on sleeping pills. Sylvia finally discloses the location of Olivia's body, which was buried in Binky's garden, although omits the fact that she murdered her sister in order to remain a pure child of God and not be molested by their father.

Jackson learns that he is the sole beneficiary of Binky's £2 million estate, and realises that the person who was tormenting him was her great-nephew Quintus who had tried to kill Jackson to obtain the money. He is able to retire and move to France. Theo begins looking after Lily-Rose, who is revealed to be Tanya. Caroline was also hiding a secret - Shirley had been the one who murdered her husband after he went to attack her during their argument, knowing that Caroline could use the insanity defence and escape her life while Tanya would stay with a new family. Realising she's pregnant again, she drives away from her husband and step-children, hoping to start her life over again for a third time.

== Characters ==
- Jackson Brodie: The protagonist who is tied to all three cases. Although long jaded by his line of work, he still holds some small hope that he is helping people to be good, rather than just punishing them for being bad. He is constantly arguing with his ex-wife and still struggles with the death of his mother, the rape-murder of his older sister and the suicide of his older brother, all in the span of less than a year, when he was just 12.
- Marlee Brodie: Jackson's precocious eight-year-old daughter who accompanies him while he works. She's recently began wearing skimpy clothing and dancing suggestively to songs by Christina Aguilera, which concerns Jackson.
- Deborah: Jackson's secretary.
- Amelia Land: The second eldest of the Land sisters and the one who was with Olivia in the tent the night she disappeared, which has haunted her for the rest of her life. She feels she has failed as an adult, only having had sex once, and feeling as if no one could ever truly love her. She makes up an imaginary boyfriend, 'Henry', just to get nosy family members and colleagues off her back about her lack of a love life.
- Julia Land: The third eldest of the Land sisters. Highly spirited, perverted and promiscuous, she is constantly arguing with and provoking Amelia, although she appears to be hiding a lot of guilt herself.
- Sylvia Land: The eldest of the Land sisters who now lives in a convent under the name Sister Mary Luke. She was her mother's least favourite child and is described even in adulthood as being unfortunate and gawky to look at. As a child she developed a love of God by her own admission, being raised in an atheist household, and claims to have first heard God talking to her at a hockey match. She was raped by her father multiple times in her childhood, and murdered Olivia because she thought that was the only way to keep her pure forever, unlike herself.
- Olivia Land: The youngest Land sister who disappeared when she was 3. She was her mother's favourite - the only one of her children she actually loved - and was also beloved by all her older sisters. Her favourite toy was Blue Mouse, and she would carry him everywhere.
- Theo Wyre: A morbidly obese, retired man who deeply misses his daughter Laura, and admits he doesn't love his other daughter, Jennifer, as much. He's a kindhearted man with an anxious disposition, who doesn't like being in public, as he is aware of people staring at him due to his weight.
- Laura Wyre: Theo's younger daughter who was murdered at 18. Although her father was convinced she was a straight laced virgin, Laura had in fact had sex with multiple people. While she loved her father, she wanted to go straight to Aberdeen University so that she could finally be independent from him.
- Lily-Rose: A 25 year old homeless woman who befriends Theo.
- Michelle/Caroline: A woman who murdered her husband Keith when she was eighteen. Described by her sister as a 'control freak', Caroline has a very detached view of everyone else in her life, and is seemingly unable to feel love for anyone except the baby she's carrying at the end of the novel. Despite this, she keeps the appearance of a dependable headmistress.
- Binky Rain: The Land sisters' old neighbour who acts bizarrely and unnerves Jackson. Despite this, she is so touched by him talking to her that she leaves her entire estate to him. Sylvia used to refer to her as 'the witch' due to her appearance and the decrepit state of her garden.

== Reception ==
Kirkus Reviews found the novel "back on form” for Atkinson, calling it, “a compulsive page-turner that looks deep into the heart of sadness, cruelty, and loss,” which “ultimately grants her charming p.i. ... a chance at happiness and some measure of reconciliation with the past”.

== Adaptations ==
- An abridged audiobook adaptation of the book was released, with Jason Isaacs narrating the book.
- An unabridged audiobook version of the book, narrated by Susan Jameson.
- A three-part television adaptation of Atkinson's first three books in the Brodie series was produced for the BBC under the blanket title Case Histories (2011). It stars Jason Isaacs as Brodie. The adaptation of Case Histories itself was shown over consecutive nights on 5 June and 6 June 2011, followed by adaptations of One Good Turn (2006) and When Will There Be Good News? (2008) over the succeeding two weeks.

== See also ==
- 2004 in literature
- Lists of books
