= Crime Thriller Awards =

British media awards

- ITV3 Crime Thriller Awards logo
- Awarded for: The best in crime and thriller fiction
- Country: United Kingdom
- Presented by: Crime Writers' Association (2009)
- First award: 2008
- Final award: 2014
- Website: Crime Thriller Awards

The Crime Thriller Awards is a British awards ceremony dedicated to crime thriller fiction. The inaugural event was held on 3 October 2008 at the Grosvenor House Hotel, hosted by comedian and Jonathan Creek actor Alan Davies. It was televised on ITV3 on 6 October, produced by Cactus TV. The ceremony was preceded by seven weeks of crime-thriller-related programming on ITV3.

In 2009, the awards were merged with the Daggers, the awards presented by the Crime Writers' Association. A second "crime thriller season" was broadcast over six weeks on ITV3 before the awards were presented on 21 October. The 2009 ceremony was sponsored by the high street optician chain Specsavers.

The 2010 and 2011 awards ceremonies were presented by Marcus Brigstocke. Since 2012, Bradley Walsh has hosted the awards.

== 2008 awards ==
- Host: Alan Davies
- Ceremony date: 3 October 2008
- Broadcast date: 6 October 2008

2008 awards
Film of the Year	ITV3 Writer's Award for Classic TV Drama (public vote)
The Bourne Ultimatum; The Dark Knight; Gone Baby Gone; No Country for Old Men	Colin Dexter; P. D. James; Lynda La Plante; Val McDermid; Ian Rankin; Ruth Rendell
TV Crime Drama	International TV Crime Drama
Criminal Justice (BBC); Spooks (BBC); Ashes to Ashes (BBC); He Kills Coppers (ITV); The No. 1 Ladies' Detective Agency (BBC); Wire in the Blood (ITV)	The Wire; CSI: Crime Scene Investigation; CSI: Miami; Dexter; Numb3rs; Shark
Best Actress	Best Actor
Hermione Norris (Spooks); Keeley Hawes (Ashes to Ashes); Amanda Redman (New Tricks); Kelly Reilly (He Kills Coppers); Jill Scott (The No. 1 Ladies' Detective Agency)	Rupert Penry-Jones (Spooks); Philip Glenister (Ashes to Ashes); James Nesbitt (Midnight Man and Murphy's Law); Dominic West (The Wire); Ben Whishaw (Criminal Justice)
Author of the Year	International Author of the Year
Ian Rankin (Exit Music); Lee Child (Bad Luck and Trouble); Robert Harris (The Ghost); Peter James (Not Dead Enough)	Stieg Larsson (The Girl with the Dragon Tattoo); Jeffery Deaver (The Sleeping Doll); Karin Slaughter (Skin Privilege); P. J. Tracy (Snow Blind)
Breakthrough Author of the Year	The International Crime Writing Hall of Fame
Stuart MacBride (Broken Skin); Chelsea Cain (Heartsick); Michael Robotham (Shatter); Anne Zouroudi (The Messenger of Athens)	Arthur Conan Doyle; Agatha Christie; P. D. James

== 2009 awards ==
- Host: Alan Davies
- Ceremony date: 21 October 2009
- Broadcast date: 27 October 2009

2009 awards
Film of the Year	ITV3 Writer's Award for Favourite Crime Genre Author (public vote)
Gran Torino; Changeling; Public Enemies; Quantum of Solace; State of Play	Harlan Coben; Martina Cole; Dick Francis; Nicci French; Alexander McCall Smith
TV Crime Drama	International TV Crime Drama
Red Riding (Channel 4 films); Ashes to Ashes (BBC); A Place of Execution (ITV); Spooks (BBC); Wallander (BBC)	The Wire; Dexter; The Mentalist; Wallander
Best Actress	Best Actor
Juliet Stevenson (Place of Execution); Emilia Fox (Silent Witness); Keeley Hawes (Ashes to Ashes); Hermione Norris (Wire in the Blood)	Dominic West (The Wire); Kenneth Branagh (Wallander); Philip Glenister (Ashes to Ashes); Tom Hardy (The Take); Paddy Considine (Red Riding)
Gold Dagger	Ian Fleming Steel Dagger
William Brodrick (A Whispered Name); Kate Atkinson (When Will There Be Good News?); Mark Billingham (In the Dark); Lawrence Block (Hit and Run); Matthew Hall (The Coroner); Gene Kerrigan (Dark Times in the City)	John Hart (The Last Child); Michael Connelly (The Brass Verdict); Gillian Flynn (Dark Places); Charlie Newton (Calumet City); Daniel Silva (Moscow Rules); Olen Steinhauer (The Tourist); Andrew Williams (The Interrogator)
John Creasey (New Blood) Dagger	The International Crime Writing Hall of Fame
Johan Theorin (Echoes from The Dead); David Fuller (Sweetsmoke); James Green (Bad Catholics); Rod Madocks (No Way To Say Goodbye); Robert Rotenberg (Old City Hall); Dan Waddell (The Blood Detective)	Colin Dexter; Lynda La Plante; Val McDermid; Ian Rankin

== 2010 awards ==
- Host: Marcus Brigstocke

2010 awards
The CWA Gold Dagger	The CWA Ian Fleming Steel Dagger
Blacklands, (Belinda Bauer); Blood Harvest (S J Bolton); Shadowplay (Karen Campbell); The Way Home (George Pelecanos)	A Loyal Spy (Simon Conway); The Dying Light (Henry Porter); Innocent (Scott Turow); Calumet City (Charlie Newton); The Gentlemen's Hour (Don Winslow)
The CW John Creasey Memorial (New Blood) Dagger	Film of the Year
Acts of Violence (Ryan David Jahn); Rupture (Simon Lelic); The Holy Thief (William Ryan); The Pull of the Moon (Diane Janes)	Inception (Warner Bros.); District 9 (Sony Pictures Entertainment); Sherlock Holmes (Warner Bros.); The Girl with the Dragon Tattoo (Momentum Pictures)
The TV Dagger	The International TV Dagger
Sherlock, (BBC Wales/Hartswood Films/WGBH-TV for BBC One); Ashes to Ashes (series 3) (BBC Wales/Kudos/Monastic Productions) for BBC One); Luther (BBC Productions for BBC One); Wallander (series 2) (Left Bank Pictures/Yellow Bird/TKBC for BBC One)	Wallander (series 2) (Yellow Bird for TV4); Damages (season 3) (Sony Pictures Television for The 101 Network); The Good Wife (season 1), (CBS Television Studios/Scott Free Productions for CBS)
The Best Actress Dagger	The Best Actor Dagger
Maxine Peake for Criminal Justice; Glenn Close for Damages; Hermione Norris for Spooks; Keeley Hawes for Ashes to Ashes and Identity; Sue Johnston for Waking the Dead	Benedict Cumberbatch for Sherlock; Idris Elba for Luther; Kenneth Branagh for Wallander; Philip Glenister for Ashes to Ashes
The Best Supporting Actress Dagger	The Best Supporting Actor Dagger
Dervla Kirwan for The Silence; Gina McKee for The Silence; Saskia Reeves for Luther; Sophie Okonedo for Criminal Justice	Matthew Macfadyen for Criminal Justice; Laurence Fox for Lewis; Rupert Graves for Sherlock; Tom Hiddleston for Wallander
The People's Detective Dagger
Foyle; Inspector Morse · Hercule Poirot · Jane Tennison · Tom Barnaby · Sherlock Holmes · Charles Wycliffe · Robert Lewis · John Rebus · Reginald Wexford · Jack Frost

== 2011 awards ==
- Host: Marcus Brigstocke

2011 awards
The Film Dagger	The People's Bestseller Dagger
True Grit (Paramount Pictures); Brighton Rock (Optimum Releasing); Source Code (Summit Entertainment); The Girl Who Kicked the Hornets' Nest (Zodiak Entertainment)	Peter James; David Baldacci; Mark Billingham; Lee Child; Peter Robinson
The TV Dagger	The International TV Dagger
Case Histories (Ruby Films for BBC One); The Shadow Line (Company Pictures/Eight Rooks Ltd/Baby Cow Productions/CinemaNX/Isle of Man Film for BBC Two); Vera (ITV Studios for ITV); Zen (Left Bank Pictures/Mediaset/Masterpiece/ZDF for BBC One)	The Killing (Danmarks Radio for DR1); Boardwalk Empire (Leverage/Closest to the Hole Productions/Sikelia Productions/Cold Front Productions for HBO); Castle (ABC Studios/Beacon Pictures/Experimental Pictures for ABC); Dexter (Showtime Networks/John Goldwyn Productions/Colleton Company/The Clyde Phillips Productions for Showtime); Spiral (Son et Lumière for Canal+)
The Best Actress Dagger	The Best Actor Dagger
Sofie Gråbøl for The Killing; Brenda Blethyn for Vera; Sue Johnston for Waking the Dead; Maxine Peake for Silk; Kelly Reilly for Above Suspicion; Olivia Williams for Case Sensitive	Idris Elba for Luther; Steve Buscemi for Boardwalk Empire; Jason Isaacs for Case Histories; Lars Mikkelsen for The Killing; Rufus Sewell for Zen
The Best Supporting Actress Dagger	The Best Supporting Actor Dagger
Ann Eleonora Jørgensen for The Killing; Amanda Abbington for Case Histories; Tara Fitzgerald for Waking the Dead; Kelly Macdonald for Boardwalk Empire; Ruth Wilson for Luther	Rafe Spall for The Shadow Line; Aidan Gillen for Thorne; Bjarne Henriksen for The Killing; John Lithgow for Dexter; Soren Malling for The Killing
The CW John Creasey Memorial (New Blood) Dagger	The CWA Ian Fleming Steel Dagger
Before I Go to Sleep, (S. J. Watson); The Dead Women of Juarez, (Sam Hawken); Kiss Me Quick, (Danny Miller); The Dogs of Rome, (Conor Fitzgerald)	The Lock Artist, (Steve Hamilton); Cold Rain, (Craig Smith); Before I Go to Sleep, (S. J. Watson); The Good Son (Michael Gruber)
The CWA Gold Dagger
Crooked Letter, (Tom Franklin); Snow Drops, (A. D. Miller); The End of the Wasp Season, (Denise Mina); The Lock Artist, (Steve Hamilton)

== 2012 awards ==
- Host: Bradley Walsh

2012 awards
The Film Dagger	Best Detective Duo (public vote)
Tinker Tailor Soldier Spy (Studio Canal); Drive (Icon); The Dark Knight Rises (Warner Bros.); The Guard (Optimum)	DI Robbie Lewis and DS James Hathaway – Lewis; DCI Alan Banks and DS Annie Cabbot – DCI Banks; DC Anna Travis and DCS James Langton – Above Suspicion; DC Jane Scott and DC Rachel Bailey – Scott & Bailey; DI Joseph Chandler and DS Ray Miles – Whitechapel; DCI Vera Stanhope and DS Joe Ashworth – Vera
The TV Dagger	The International TV Dagger
Sherlock (Hartswood Films for BBC One); Appropriate Adult (ITV Studios for ITV); Line of Duty (World Productions for BBC Two); Whitechapel (Carnival Films for ITV); Wallander (Left Bank Pictures/Yellow Bird for BBC One)	The Bridge (Danmarks Radio/Sveriges Television); Boardwalk Empire (season 2) (HBO); Dexter (season 6) (Showtime Networks/John Goldwyn Productions/The Colleton Company/Clyde Phillips Productions); Homeland (Teakwood Lane Productions/Showtime Productions/Cherry Pie Productions/Keshet Media Group/Fox 21); The Killing II (Arrow Films)
The Best Actress Dagger	The Best Actor Dagger
Claire Danes for Homeland; Brenda Blethyn for Vera; Sofie Gråbøl for The Killing II; Sofia Helin for The Bridge; Maxine Peake for Silk	Benedict Cumberbatch for Sherlock; Kenneth Branagh for Wallander; Steve Buscemi for Boardwalk Empire; Damian Lewis for Homeland; Dominic West for Appropriate Adult
The Best Supporting Actress Dagger	The Best Supporting Actor Dagger
Kelly Macdonald for Boardwalk Empire; Frances Barber for Silk; Archie Panjabi for The Good Wife; Sarah Smart for Wallander; Una Stubbs for Sherlock	Martin Freeman for Sherlock; Alun Armstrong for Garrow's Law; Alan Cumming for The Good Wife; Phil Davis for Silk and Whitechapel; Laurence Fox for Lewis
The CWA Gold Dagger	The John Creasey New Blood Dagger
The Rage by Gene Kerrigan (Harvill Secker); Bereft by Chris Womersley (Quercus); Vengeance in Mind by N. J. Cooper (Simon and Schuster); The Flight by M. R. Hall (Mantle)	A Land More Kind than Home by Wiley Cash (Bantam); Heart-Shaped Bruise by Tanya Byrne (Headline); What Dies in Summer by Tom Wright (Canongate); Good People by Ewart Hutton (Blue Door)
The Ian Fleming Steel Dagger	The Specsavers Bestseller Dagger
A Foreign Country by Charles Cumming (HarperCollins); Dare Me by Megan Abbott (Picador); Reamde by Neal Stephenson (Atlantic Books); The Fear Index by Robert Harris (Hutchinson)	Flash and Bones by Kathy Reichs (Cornerstone); Birthdays for the Dead by Stuart MacBride (HarperCollins); The Bat by Jo Nesbø (Vintage); The Glass Room by Ann Cleeves (Pan); The House of Silk by Anthony Horowitz (Orion)

== 2013 awards ==
- Host: Bradley Walsh

2013 awards
The Film Dagger	ITV3 Crime Thriller Living Legends
Skyfall (Metro-Goldwyn-Mayer/Columbia Pictures); Jack Reacher (Paramount Pictures); Killing Them Softly (The Weinstein Company); Looper (TriStar Pictures/FilmDistrict); Seven Psychopaths (Momentum Pictures)	Martina Cole; Wilbur Smith; Harlan Coben; Patricia Cornwell; Frederick Forsyth; Nicci French
The TV Dagger	The International TV Dagger
Broadchurch (Kudos Film and Television for ITV); The Bletchley Circle (World Productions for ITV); The Fall (Artists Studio/BBC Northern Ireland for BBC Two/RTÉ One); Luther (BBC Drama Productions for BBC One); Top of the Lake (See-Saw Films/Screen Australia for BBC Two/BBC UKTV/Sundance Channel)	The Killing III (Arrow Films); Arne Dahl (Filmlance International/SVT/ZDF/Filmregion Stockholm-Mälardalen/Nordisk Film); Boardwalk Empire (season 3) (HBO); Homeland (Teakwood Lane Productions/Showtime/Cherry Pie Productions/Keshet/Fox 21)
The Best Actress Dagger	The Best Actor Dagger
Olivia Colman for Broadchurch; Gillian Anderson for The Fall; Claire Danes for Homeland; Sofie Gråbøl for The Killing III; Lesley Sharp for Scott & Bailey	David Tennant for Broadchurch; Paddy Considine for The Suspicions of Mr Whicher: The Murder In Angel Lane; Idris Elba for Luther; Jason Isaacs for Case Histories; Damian Lewis for Homeland
The Best Supporting Actress Dagger	The Best Supporting Actor Dagger
Amelia Bullmore for Scott & Bailey; Holly Hunter for Top of the Lake; Pauline Quirke for Broadchurch; Jodie Whittaker for Broadchurch; Ruth Wilson for Luther	Andrew Buchan for Broadchurch; Roger Allam for Endeavour; Warren Brown for Luther; Paul McGann for A Mother's Son; Mandy Patinkin for Homeland
The CWA Ian Fleming Steel Dagger (Best Thriller)	The CWA John Creasey New Blood Dagger (Best New Crime Writer)
Ghostman by Roger Hobbs (Transworld); Capital Punishment by Robert Wilson (Orion); Ratlines by Stuart Neville (Random House); The Sentinel by Mark Oldfield (Head of Zeus)	Derek B. Miller for Norwegian by Night (Faber and Faber); The Necessary Death of Lewis Winter by Malcolm MacKay (Mantle); Shadow of the Rock by Thomas Mogford (Bloomsbury); Something You Are by Hanna Jameson (Head of Zeus)
The CWA Goldsboro Gold Dagger (Best Crime Novel)	ITV3 Crime Thriller Book Club Best Read
Dead Lions by Mick Herron (Soho Press); Rage Against the Dying by Becky Masterman (Orion); Rubbernecker by Belinda Bauer (Bantam/Transworld); The Shining Girls by Lauren Beukes (HarperCollins)	The Necessary Death of Lewis Winter by Malcolm MacKay (Mantle); Bryant & May and the Invisible Code by Christopher Fowler; City of Devils by Diana Bretherick; Dare Me by Megan Abbott; The Scent of Death by Andrew Taylor; Trust Your Eyes by Linwood Barclay

== 2014 ITV Specsavers awards ==
- Host: Bradley Walsh

2014 awards
The Film Dagger	ITV3 Crime Thriller Living Legends
Cold in July	Denise Mina; Robert Harris; Midsomer Murders
The TV Dagger	The International TV Dagger
Happy Valley	True Detective
The Best Actress Dagger	The Best Actor Dagger
Keeley Hawes for Line of Duty	Matthew McConaughey for True Detective
The Best Supporting Actress Dagger	The Best Supporting Actor Dagger
Amanda Abbington for Sherlock	James Norton for Happy Valley
The CWA Ian Fleming Steel Dagger (Best Thriller)	The CWA John Creasey New Blood Dagger (Best New Crime Writer)
An Officer and a Spy by Robert Harris (Arrow)	Ray Celestin for The Axeman’s Jazz (Mantle)
The CWA Goldsboro Gold Dagger (Best Crime Novel)	ITV3 Specsavers Crime Thriller Book Club Best Read of the Year
This Dark Road to Mercy by Wiley Cash (Doubleday/Transworld)	Entry Island by Peter May (Quercus)
