= Behind the Scenes at the Museum =

1995 novel by Kate Atkinson

- First edition cover
- Author: Kate Atkinson
- Language: English
- Publisher: Doubleday
- Publication date: 2 March 1995
- Publication place: United Kingdom
- Media type: Print (Hardcover)
- Pages: 381 pp
- ISBN: 0-385-40607-X

Behind the Scenes at the Museum is British novelist Kate Atkinson's debut novel, published in 1995. The book covers the experiences of Ruby Lennox, a girl from a working-class English family living in York. The museum of the title is York Castle Museum, which includes among its exhibits the façades of old houses from the city, similar to the one in which Ruby's family lives.

By interspersing flashbacks with the narrative of Ruby's own life, the book chronicles the lives of four generations of women from Ruby's great-grandmother Alice and grandmother Nell, to Ruby's mother Bunty and Ruby herself.

Ruby's own life is told in thirteen chapters, written in the first person, documenting key periods in Ruby's life from 1951 ("Conception" beginning with the words "I exist!") to 1992. Between each chapter are (non-consecutive) flashbacks that tell the story from the point of view of one of the other members of Ruby's family—including her great-grandmother Alice, her grandmother Nell and her mother Bunty.

While mostly telling the story of the family's women, several of the flashbacks vividly depict the wartime experiences of their male relatives and lovers in both World Wars. One of these depicts the crew of a Halifax bomber on a doomed last mission over Nazi Germany—which would become a major plot element in Atkinson's 2015 novel, A God in Ruins.

== Main characters ==
- Alice Barker, Ruby's great grandmother
- Nell, Ruby’s maternal grandmother
- Lillian, Nell's sister
- Bunty, Ruby's mother, Nell's daughter
- George, Ruby's father
- Ruby Lennox, Bunty's daughter/Narrator
- Gillian Lennox, Ruby's older sister
- Patricia Lennox, Ruby's oldest sister

== Plot and themes ==
Common themes in the book include the untimely death of children, the effect of the two World Wars on the family, the ultimate fate of characters who "disappeared" from their family's lives never to be heard of again, and how the women of the family feel compelled to enter into unhappy marriages.

The fate of Ruby's family is revealed gradually. A number of revelations, such as the fact that Ruby's sister Gillian dies in a road accident aged 11, are revealed to the reader long before they occur. However, other revelations relating to the fate of various characters are withheld and revealed gradually throughout the novel, including:

- The fact that Ruby had a twin sister, Pearl, who drowned shortly before their fourth birthday, for which Ruby was falsely blamed (Gillian lied to shift the blame from herself). Ruby has lost all memory of Pearl, and it is not until she is given hypnotherapy at the age of 18 that she remembers Pearl at all. We are given subtle hints of Pearl's existence earlier in the novel (e.g. the doctor looking surprised when Ruby was born as if he wasn't expecting it, the midwife inexplicably saying "Snap," Ruby's mother seeming to possess twice as many pictures of Ruby as of her other children), but because everything is told from Ruby's point of view, their significance is not made narratively explicit.
- That Ruby's great-grandmother Alice, who was believed to have died giving birth to Ruby's grandmother Nell, actually ran away with a travelling French photographer in an effort to escape her unhappy life. She spent her final years back in York, vainly searching for her children.
- The whereabouts of characters who "disappeared" from family life is not explained until nearer the end of the book: these include Nell's brother Lawrence, her sister Lillian, and Ruby's sister Patricia.
- The interconnections between Ruby's family, and Doreen O'Doherty, the Irish nurse. When Doreen is first mentioned, she is introduced as the person with whom Ruby's father George is having an affair. In a later flashback, we discover that Doreen had become pregnant by Edmund, Bunty's Canadian cousin (son of Nell's sister Lillian), who was in the UK on a tour of duty with the Royal Air Force during the Second World War In the final chapter, clues allow us to surmise that the nurse who is present at Bunty's 1992 death is the daughter of Doreen and Edmund, whom Doreen gave up for adoption.
- The father of Edmund, whom the unmarried Lillian had steadfastly refused to name, is revealed on the final page of the footnote ahead of Chapter 11.

== Current edition ==
- Picador (1999) ISBN 0-312-15060-1

== Awards ==
The book won the 1995 Whitbread Book of the Year, beating The Moor's Last Sigh by Salman Rushdie and a biography of William Ewart Gladstone by Roy Jenkins. The book also won the 1996 Boeke Prize.
