= Not the End of the World =

Not the End of the World or It's Not the End of the World may refer to:

== Books ==
- Not the End of the World (Brookmyre novel) (1998), by Christopher Brookmyre
- Not the End of the World (McCaughrean novel) (2004), by Geraldine McCaughrean
- It's Not the End of the World (1972), by Judy Blume
- Not the End of the World (short story collection) (2002), by Kate Atkinson

== Songs ==
- "Not the End of the World" (song), a 2020 song by Katy Perry
- "It's Not the End of the World, But I Can See It from Here", a 2010 song by Lostprophets
- "It's Not the End of the World?", a 2002 song by Super Furry Animals
- "Not the End of the World", a song by Jay Chou from the 2011 album Wow!
