= Kate Meyrick =

Irish night club owner in London

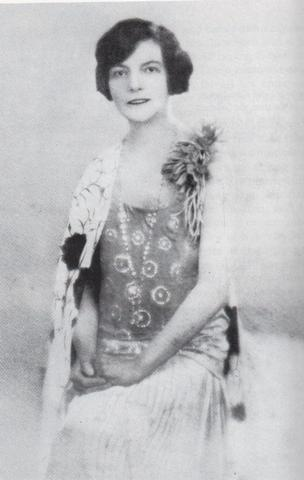
- Born: August 7, 1875 [[Kingstown, Ireland]
- Died: January 19, 1933 (aged 57)
- Spouse: Ferdinand Richard Holmes Merrick
- Children: 8

Kate Meyrick (7 August 1875 – 19 January 1933) known as the 'Night Club Queen' was an Irish night-club owner in 1920s London. During her 13-year career she made, and spent, a fortune and served five prison sentences. She was the inspiration for the character Ma Mayfield in Evelyn Waugh's novel, Brideshead Revisited.

== Early life and marriage ==
Kate Evelyn Nason was born on 7 August 1875 at 24 Cambridge Terrace, Kingstown to John William Washington Nason, a doctor, and Sarah Frances, née Bateman. Her father died from meningitis in 1876 and her mother married the clergyman Reverend Edwin Sandys Jackson in June 1880. The family moved to England and lived at the rectory in Great Sankey, Lancashire. When Kate was seven years old, her mother died and she and her older sister, Ethel, returned to Kingstown where they were raised by their grandmother, Isabella Bateman, and two great aunts at Fairyland, York Road. She was educated by governesses then attended Alexandra College from 1891 to 1893.

In December 1899 she married a doctor, Ferdinand Richard Holmes Merrick (later changed to Meyrick), in a ceremony performed by her stepfather in St John's church, Monkstown. The couple lived on Palmerston Road, Rathmines, Dublin, for a short time before moving to England and settling in Southsea, Hampshire. For fifteen years, Kate Meyrick assisted her husband with running nursing homes for psychiatric patients, during this time the couple moved to London and lived in Ealing for a time. Between 1900 and 1914, eight children were born to the couple: six daughters and two sons. The marriage was not successful and the couple considered divorce three times before permanently separating in 1918.

== Career ==
After separation from her husband at the age of 43, Meyrick found herself having to support eight children with a weekly allowance of less than £1 a week. Looking for well-paid work, she responded to an advert, "Fifty pounds wanted for partnership to run tea dances" whilst in London nursing her eldest daughter, who had caught influenza whilst studying at college. In April 1919, she opened Dalton's in a basement close to the Alhambra Theatre in Leicester Square in partnership with Harry Dalton (real name Henry Sampson). Dalton's was described as a "rendezvous for members of the theatrical and variety professions and their friends" but the venture was short-lived. In January 1920, the club was struck off the register and Meyrick and Dalton were both fined at Bow Street Magistrates' Court. The prosecutor in the case described the club as a "dancing hell and a sink of iniquity".

Meyrick's 1920 conviction was the first in a string of encounters with the Metropolitan Police and law courts which lasted throughout her career. The sale of alcohol in Britain at the time was subject to strict licensing laws as well as the Defence of the Realm Act which was introduced during the First World War. Night club owners did what they could to circumvent the rules to provide venues for dancing and drinking to the new generation of Bright Young Things. In a game of cat and mouse with the authorities, Meyrick opened a series of clubs under different names. As soon as one was shut down for breaching licensing laws she would open another – usually at the same premises.

After running clubs called the Bedford and Brett's, Meyrick opened her most famous venue, the 43 Club at 43 Gerrard Street, Soho, in November 1920, an address which was also once the home of poet John Dryden. The basement was used as a dance hall and the ground floor housed a large lounge. The bar was located in a small room accessed via a locked door, the manager kept hold of the key. The 43 Club was open all night until 6am and offered dinners, suppers and breakfasts alongside the illicit alcohol. Meyrick collected the door money in a front office and customers paid to dance to jazz bands and artists with Meyrick's Merry Maids who encouraged them to spend even more. The club was popular with celebrities and royalty including the actors Rudolph Valentino and Tallulah Bankhead, jazz musician Harry Gold, and authors J. B. Priestley, Evelyn Waugh and Joseph Conrad. Meyrick claimed that the Egyptian aristocrat Ali Kamel Fahmy Bey had been a regular customer before he was murdered by his wife Marguerite Alibert at the Savoy Hotel. Army and naval officers on leave were regular attendees as were students, "butterflies of the gay nightlife" and underworld figures. Meyrick claimed that gangsters would sometimes refuse to pay. A disagreement one evening led to two shots being fired inside the club. Mirrors were shattered and a piano was damaged but no one was hurt. On another notable evening, members of the IRA celebrated at the club after stealing machine guns from Chelsea Barracks.

In February 1922, the 43 Club was raided by police and Meyrick was fined at Bow Street Magistrates' Court for selling intoxicating liquor without a licence. "A raid at these places was always an exciting affair", it was reported in the press, "whistles would be blown and glasses knocked off the tables in a vain effort to conceal the fact that illegal drinking was taking place". The police would have to undertake surveillance before a raid and this involved dressing in plain clothes and attending the club as a customer. During these visits, police officers would join in with the dances and buy alcoholic drinks to gather their evidence. Sometimes officers disguised themselves with one constable posing as a Russian duke with the unlikely name of Maxton Hagel.

Meyrick reopened the 43 Club as Procter's Club in 1923 and opened a new club that same year called the Folies Bergères at 14 Newman Street, Fitzrovia. By May 1923, Meyrick was summoned to Marlborough Street Magistrates Court for supplying intoxicating liquor after permitted hours. Meyrick reopened the club as the New Follies only to be fined again a few months later on charges in connection with early morning drinking. By now, Meyrick's activities were beginning to receive attention in the press. Describing her as a "Wicked Woman", John Bull magazine reported Meyrick saying, "Fines don't worry me... I'm getting quite accustomed to them now. I suppose they'll keep on fining me! Well, it can't be helped – you can't run night clubs unless you are prepared for this sort of thing." At some point during the 1920s, Meyrick bought protection from the Sabini gang to protect against police raids.

After the closure of the New Follies club, it was reopened as The Broadway and Meyrick was fined again in September 1924 for aiding and abetting the sale of intoxicating liquor at the club. Just a few months later, in November, Meyrick was sentenced to six months in Holloway Prison for the sale of drink at Procter's (formerly the 43 Club). By now, Meyrick had caught the attention of the press who dubbed her with the moniker "Queen of the Night Clubs", they reported on her antics with a combination of admiration and scorn. Reynold's News published a feature, "Amazing Career of the Queen of the Night Clubs" describing Meyrick as a "woman without scruples" who mocked the law. It was claimed that Meyrick had earned £30,000 in her first year as a night club proprietress and she had been able to pay for her children to be educated at top private schools. Meyrick later estimated that £500,000 had passed through her hands over the course of her career. Her court appearances drew press interest because she was usually well-dressed in a fur trimmed coat and her glamorous friends would be present in the public gallery. Public interest in Meyrick was furthered by the fact that three of her daughters married into the British nobility: Mary in 1928 to the 14th Earl of Kinnoull, Irene in 1939 to the 6th Earl of Craven, and Dorothy in 1926 to the 26th Baron de Clifford. Meyrick capitalised on the attention she received by selling her story "My Secrets, Ten Years Behind the Scenes in London's Night-Life" to The Sentinel in early 1929.

By the time William Joynson-Hicks became Home Secretary in November 1924, the Metropolitan Police had been campaigning for some time for more powers to tackle night club owners such as Kate Meyrick. Joynson-Hicks encouraged raids on night clubs and made plans to bring in a bill to improve the policing of them. He was supported in this endeavour by the chief of the metropolitan police, William Horwood, and the bishop of London. The bill did not progress beyond an early draft in 1925 but organisations such as the British Social Hygiene Council and public concern about the morality of night clubs ensured Joynson-Hicks's "war on night clubs" lasted until the end of his tenure as Home Secretary in 1929.

Meyrick's children assisted her with the running of her night clubs and, while she was in Holloway Prison, her son Henry was fined after a raid on the 43 Club. Her daughter Mary had also been fined in September 1924. After her release from prison in 1925, Meyrick moved to Paris to open the Merrick Gaiety in Rue Fontaine, Montmartre. While she was in France, Meyrick's children continued to look after the night clubs in London. Merrick's Gaiety was reported to be unsuccessful with more waiters than customers and Meyrick described as a "Queen With Few Subjects".

Meyrick returned to London in 1927 and opened the Silver Slipper Club in Regent Street which had an illuminated glass floor. In June the following year she was sentenced to another six months in prison for selling intoxicating liquor at the Cecil Club which had formerly been the 43 Club. On her release in November of that year, Meyrick greeted a crowd of people as she stepped out of Holloway Prison. Dressed in a velvet coat, blue hat and carrying a scarlet handbag, she told waiting reporters and photographers that she did a great deal of reading in prison where they had "a splendid library". She was met by her family, including her daughter Lady Kinnoull, who drove her away in a "luxury motor car". Meyrick celebrated her release at a party at the Silver Slipper Club. The following month, Meyrick was arrested twice: one charge was for selling intoxicating liquor without a licence at the 43 Club and the other charge was for bribing George Goddard, a Metropolitan Police Sergeant.

In January 1929, Meyrick went on trial for bribery at the Old Bailey alongside restaurateur and brothel keeper, Luigi Ribuffi and Ex-Sergeant Goddard of Vine Street police station. Meyrick was said to have paid Goddard £155 in return for receiving advance warnings about police raids on her clubs. This arrangement appeared to have suited her well as there were no police raids on her clubs for a time between 1925 and 1928. The trial lasted for seven days and there was such interest in the case that, in its closing stages, a crowd of several hundred people gathered outside the Old Bailey. Meyrick was sentenced to fifteen months hard labour in Holloway Prison. She served twelve months of her sentence and was released in January 1930. She told reporters that she had suffered from ill-health in prison and had been getting up at an "unearthly hour" to sew mail bags.

Meyrick's freedom was short-lived, however, in July 1930 she was sentenced once again to six months in prison for selling intoxicating liquor at the Richmond Club which was on the premises of the 43 Club. During this court appearance she was reported to be "sobbing" and "crying hysterically" in the dock. After her release from Holloway Prison in December, Meyrick was reported to be in Monte Carlo the following month negotiating the purchase of a cabaret club. Nothing came of this venture, however, and in May 1931 Meyrick received another jail term of six months hard labour for using 43 Gerrard Street for the purposes of gaming and betting and selling intoxicating liquor. Meyrick was now 55 years old and, a few months into her sentence, she was transferred to the prison hospital. She was released from prison the following month to no fanfare – a stark contrast to the celebrations after previous releases.

Meyrick's final court appearance was in May 1932 at Marlborough Street police court where she pleaded guilty to supplying intoxicating liquor at the Bunch of Keys Club on the premises of the 43 Club. The presiding magistrate asked her counsel to pledge that she never run night clubs again under an order in force for three years. Meyrick said, "I was obliged ... to give in a court of law an honourable undertaking that I would not transgress for three years those laws which dictate to grown men and women the hours within which they may purchase alcoholic refreshment".

== Death ==
Meyrick died on 19 January 1933 from influenza, aged 57. Her son-in-law, Lord Kinnoull commented shortly after her death, "Mrs Meyrick's health had undoubtedly been weakened by her several periods of imprisonment.” On the day of her large funeral at St Martin-in-the-Fields, West End theatres and clubs dimmed their lights. There was a big turnout on the day from people well known in London's night club life. Meyrick's estranged husband was reported to have attended at her funeral, inconsolable. She is buried in Kensal Green Cemetery.

Despite the vast sums of money Meyrick earned during her career, her estate was valued at only £771 8s 1d. She had claimed that all her earnings had been spent on running her clubs, educating her children and legal fees.

In February 1933, the Leeds Mercury stated that Scotland Yard had obtained a copy of the manuscript of Meyrick's posthumously published autobiography, Secrets of the 43 Club, leading to suspicion that it was subsequently censored to protect the Metropolitan Police and aristocratic society. The author J. B. Priestley objected to being mentioned in the book, claiming he had never frequented Meyrick's clubs.

== In fiction ==
- The character Ma Mayfield and her 'Old Hundredth' Club featured in Evelyn Waugh's 1934 novel A Handful of Dust and his 1945 novel, Brideshead Revisited. The character and the club were inspired by Meyrick and the 43 Club.
- Anthony Powell referenced the 43 Club in his 1931 novel, Afternoon Men.
- In Kate Atkinson's 2022 novel Shrines of Gaiety, the character Nellie Coker is based on Meyrick.
- Kerry Greenwood referenced Kate Meyrick in her 2001 book Away With the Fairies (Phryne Fisher #11), describing her as a "notorious night-club keeper".
- The lead character Kate Galloway in the 2025 British TV drama Dope Girls is based on Meyrick. The series is adapted from the non-fiction book of the same name by Marek Kohn.

== Commemoration ==
Kate Meyrick was one of the figures showcased by the UK National Archives in their 2022 exhibition 20's People, including a recreation of The 43 Club based on police records.
