= Life After Life (TV series) =

- Promotional poster for series
- Genre: Period drama; Science fiction
- Created by: Bash Doran
- Based on: Life After Life by Kate Atkinson
- Written by: Bash Doran
- Directed by: John Crowley
- Music by: Volker Bertelmann
- Country of origin: United Kingdom
- Original language: English
- No. of episodes: 4

Production
- Executive producers: Kate Atkinson; Ayela Butt; John Crowley; Juliette Howell; Lucy Richer; Tessa Ross
- Producer: Kate Ogborn
- Cinematography: Stuart Bentley
- Editor: Nick Emerson

Original release
- Network: BBC Two
- Release: 19 April – 10 May 2022

Life After Life is a 2022 British television miniseries created and written by playwright Bash Doran that adapts the 2013 novel Life After Life by Kate Atkinson. The series was directed by John Crowley. It follows the story of Ursula Todd, a woman in the first half of the 20th century who experiences an endless cycle of birth, death, and rebirth.

The protagonist Ursula Todd dies one night in 1910 before she can draw her first breath. On that same night, she is reborn and survives. Living and dying in different circumstances time and again, Ursula is reborn into new and alternative lives. The story follows Ursula as she navigates each life through a critical era that spans two world wars.

== Background ==
The BBC commissioned a four-part adaptation of the novel Life After Life in December 2020. In April 2021, it was announced that Thomasin McKenzie and Sian Clifford would star in the series alongside James McArdle, Jessica Brown Findlay, and Jessica Hynes with Patsy Ferran, Harry Michell, Laurie Kynaston, Joshua Hill, and Maria Laird completing the cast. The series began broadcast on 19 April 2022 on BBC Two and BBC iPlayer.

== Cast ==
=== Main ===
- Thomasin McKenzie as Ursula Todd
- Sian Clifford as Sylvie Todd
- James McArdle as Hugh Todd
- Jessica Hynes as Mrs. Glover
- Ron Cook as Dr. Fellowes
- Sean Delaney as Teddy Todd
- Isla Johnston as 10-year-old Ursula
- Lesley Manville as the Narrator
- Jessica Brown Findlay as Izzie
- Harry Michell as Maurice Todd
- Patsy Ferran as Pamela Todd
- John Hodgkinson as Dr. Kellet
- Joshua Hill as Derek Oliphant
- Laurie Kynaston as Jimmy Todd

=== Recurring ===
- Maria Laird as Bridget
- Louis Hofmann as Jürgen
- Jack Forsyth-Noble as George Glover
- Anders Hayward as Fred Smith
- Eliza Riley as 5-year-old Ursula
  - Matilda Stafford / Pamela Stafford as 6-month-old Ursula
  - Nelly Rumball as newborn Ursula
- James George Williams as 10-year-old Teddy
  - Oscar Eskinazi as 4-year-old Teddy
- Declan Miele-Howell as 13-year-old Maurice
  - Leo Rait as 10-year-old Maurice
  - Alfie Harrison as 5-year-old Maurice
- Sadie Byron as 11–13 year-old Pamela
  - Kelsey Balla as 8-year-old Pamela
  - Hope Delaney as 3-year-old Pamela
- Gus Turner as 5-year-old Jimmy
- Evie Templeton as 10-year-old Frieda
  - Clara Graham as 3-year-old Frieda

== Episodes ==
No.	Title	Directed by	Written by	Original release date
1	"Episode 1"	John Crowley	Bash Doran	19 April 2022 (Note: All 4 episodes were released on this date online via the BBC iPlayer.)
During the Second World War, Ursula Todd discusses what she would do if she had her time again with her brother Teddy. In 1910, she is stillborn due to a lack of medical assistance, but the birth repeats with a doctor able to intervene, and Ursula survives. Similar situations take place as she gets older, with Ursula drowning on a trip to the seaside and falling to her death out of a window, but avoiding those fates when events play out slightly differently after reincarnations. Whilst broadly enjoying a happy and comfortable upbringing, this cycle of death and rebirth appears to make her a deeply anxious child who frequently dreams about dying. During the First World War, Ursula's father decides to enlist in the army, which upsets her mother; he tells his wife he wants to fight for what he believes in, but she suspects he is looking for adventure. The pair seem to reconcile by the time he leaves but lose contact soon after. The war takes a toll on the family, but Ursula's mother does her best to keep the children happy. At the end of the conflict, the family maid Bridget's attendance at a victory celebration in London brings Spanish Flu into the household. Events play out differently in ways that lead to the death of Ursula, along with (in later cases) one and then two of her siblings (on three occasions). Living through the experience on a fourth occasion, Ursula pushes Bridget down the stairs to prevent her going to the celebration, provoking the bewildered anger of her mother. Ursula's father arrives home to the delight of his family. The narrative returns to an adult Ursula's conversation from the start of episode. She dances with Teddy before he leaves for service in the Royal Air Force.
2	"Episode 2"	John Crowley	Bash Doran	26 April 2022
In the years after the First World War, Ursula continues to suffer from mental health problems, leading to her parents sending her to see a psychiatrist in London. She is looked after by her aunt Izzie whilst in London. She dies when her aunt crashes her car, but avoids that fate after reincarnating. Ursula becomes happier as she gets older and eventually stops her visits. On her 16th birthday, her older brother Maurice brings his friends from Oxford University to visit. Ursula is attracted to an American student, Howie, and they kiss in the garden. The next time Maurice's friends come to visit Howie rapes her and she becomes pregnant. She goes to ask Izzie for help, who takes her to get an abortion, a procedure she doesn't really understand. She develops blood poisoning and is taken to hospital, when her parents discover her whereabouts, but survives. Somewhat estranged from her mother and struggling with her experience, Ursula drops out of school and trains as a secretary. She finds a job before becoming a loner and alcoholic. Whilst sober, she meets Derek when he helps her pick up dropped groceries and the two quickly get married.
3	"Episode 3"	John Crowley	Bash Doran	3 May 2022
Ursula moves in with Derek, but finds married life difficult to get used to. Her new husband is cold towards her, accuses her of wasting money and assaults her because she has joined the tennis club, and appears to lie about having a sister. One day when she believes he is working at the school, the house is visited by representatives of the bank who say that he has lost his job for using excessive force on a pupil. The textbooks he claims to have written don't exist, and he is in large amounts of debt. She attempts to run away from the house and is severely beaten by Derek. She then escapes, going to stay with Izzie, but is found by Derek, who kills her. Living again, Ursula rejects Howie's first kiss, avoiding the course her last life took. She stays at school and goes on to study foreign languages at Oxford. Ursula works for a year teaching English in Munich. In the summer, a friend takes her on a hike with members of the Nazi party youth organization The League of German Girls, where she falls in love with Jürgen, a member of the Hitler Youth. But she is alarmed when she sees his indifferent response to a friend in the SA beating someone up in the street. After returning home, she begins a career as a civil servant, getting a job in the Home Office. The Second World War breaks out, Ursula's two younger brothers join up for military service, her older brother continues his job in the civil service, Ursula works collating air raid statistics whilst having a brief relationship with railwayman Fred, and Teddy is killed in action. Ursula has a long career and retires, but in her old age feels that she has something left to do. A little girl at the start of a new life again, Ursula is introduced to newborn Teddy by her father.
4	"Episode 4"	John Crowley	Bash Doran	10 May 2022
Ursula wishes she could be more involved in the Second World War, fantasises about killing Hitler, and worries deeply about her younger brothers, particularly Teddy, with whom she has an especially close bond. One night, she dies when an air raid directly hits her tenement block's shelter. She is comforted in her final moments by an Air Raid Warden and volunteers as one in her next life. Ursula is killed in an air raid with Fred. Back in 1910, Ursula's mother doesn't have medical help whilst giving birth but manages to free the baby from the umbilical cord wrapped around her neck herself. Growing up again, Ursula frequently ponders the meaning of life and decides to study philosophy. She travels to Germany and meets Jürgen, in this life a privately liberal German lawyer. They marry and have a daughter Frieda. Her family worry about what will happen to them if war breaks out, but she refuses their suggestion that the family, or at least Ursula and Frieda, come to stay at her childhood home in advance of a conflict starting. Her father pleads with her to leave as quickly as possible if a war begins, but she is ultimately too late. Jürgen is killed in an air raid. Starving and without hope of survival by the end of the war, she commits suicide by poisoning herself and her daughter. In her next life, Ursula is a deeply morbid, emotional person. After her brother's death, she becomes determined to kill Hitler, and commits suicide by jumping out of a window in order to get the opportunity to do it. In her next life, she learns how to shoot and goes to Munich where she successfully shoots Hitler in the head, but is immediately shot by his guards. In her subsequent life, Ursula is told by the psychiatrist as a young girl that it doesn't matter whether she has lived before or not because that's the way she experiences life. She tells Teddy she loves him the last time they meet. At her parents' house, the family discuss whether they would live their lives again, and Ursula's father discusses his own wartime experience with her before she returns to London on the train.

== Reception ==
Critically, it earned generally positive reviews.

The Guardian and Radio Times gave the series 4 stars out of 5, both praising the quality of its "stellar cast." The Guardian said: "The show's main priority is apparent from the start: making people cry. If you like the feeling of being overwhelmed by vicarious trauma and grief then you're in for a treat. And the anguish is thoroughly addictive. It's what makes Life After Life incredibly compelling, binge-worthy even, despite being practically plotless from one episode to the next."

The Radio Times review noted that "Life After Life combines much of what appeals to British viewing audiences – a rose-tinted English countryside of old, a wartime setting, a stellar cast – but with its mind-bending, time-looping twist, it is entirely its own beast."

Another review in The Telegraph praised the adaptation's truthfulness to the original story, describing it as a "gorgeously-realised and entirely faithful adaptation of Kate Atkinson’s 2013 bestseller."

A mixed review by Gerard Gilbert on iNews described the drama as "overcomplicated" but concluded that the "handsome production was bolstered by strong performances. The first episode eventually overcame its tricky structure to suggest that there might yet be life in Life After Life."

The series was nominated for a BAFTA award for 'Titles and Graphic Identity' in 2023.
