= Human Croquet =

1997 novel by Kate Atkinson

- First edition cover
- Author: Kate Atkinson
- Language: English
- Publisher: Doubleday
- Publication date: March 1, 1997
- Publication place: United Kingdom
- Media type: Print (Hardcover)
- ISBN: 978-0-312-15550-6
- OCLC: 36301340
- Dewey Decimal: 823/.914 21
- LC Class: PR6051.T56 H86 1997

Human Croquet is the second novel of Kate Atkinson. The book covers the experiences of Isobel Fairfax, including her occasional bouts of time-travelling, while setting out the legacy of a 300-year-old family curse.

== Reception ==
In a review of Atkinson's later novel Life After Life (2013), Sam Sacks of The Wall Street Journal stated that Human Croquet was "indifferently received".
