= One Good Turn =

One Good Turn may refer to:

- One Good Turn (Rybczynski book), published in 2000 by Witold Rybczynski
- One Good Turn (novel), a 2006 novel by Kate Atkinson
- One Good Turn (1931 film), a 1931 short comedy film starring Laurel and Hardy
- One Good Turn (1936 film)
- One Good Turn (1951 film)
- One Good Turn (1955 film)
- One Good Turn (1996 film), a 1996 thriller directed by Tony Randel
- "One Good Turn", a song by Al Jarreau from the 1980 Sesame Street album In Harmony
- "One Good Turn..." a Thomas & Friends Series 3 episode
- "One Good Turn", a Phineas and Ferb season 4 episode

== See also ==
- Good Turn, the daily good deed in Scouting
