= Anne Zouroudi =

British novelist

Anne Zouroudi (born Lincolnshire) is a British novelist, and author of the Greek Detective series. Her protagonist is Hermes Diaktoros, also known simply as "the fat man". Anne Zouroudi was shortlisted for the ITV3 Crime Thriller Award 2008 for Breakthrough Authors, and The Messenger of Athens was longlisted for the Desmond Elliott Prize 2008 for first novels with word of mouth appeal.

== Biography ==
Anne was born in rural Lincolnshire but raised in South Yorkshire. After working in IT in the UK and US, Anne met and married a Greek man and settled in Greece.She returned to the UK having separated from her husband. She recently returned to Greece and now lives on the island of Rhodes.

== Bibliography ==
- The Messenger of Athens (2007)
- The Taint of Midas (2008)
- The Doctor of Thessaly (2009)
- The Lady of Sorrows (2010)
- The Whispers of Nemesis (2011)
- The Bull of Mithros (2012)
- The Feast of Artemis (2013)
- The Gifts of Poseidon (2016)
