= 43 Club =

Former London nightclub

Coordinates: 51°30′43″N 0°7′49″W

The 43 Club or "The 43" was a nightclub at 43 Gerrard Street in Soho, London that became notorious during the Jazz Age for outrageous parties frequented by the decadent rich and famous. Local myth provides many tales of provocative, licentious and sometimes criminal goings on.

== Kate Meyrick ==
The proprietor, Kate Meyrick, was eventually jailed five times before the club finally closed. She and her clubs were targeted by the Home Secretary, William Joynson-Hicks, who instructed the head of London's Metropolitan Police, William Horwood that ‘it is a place of the most intense mischief and immorality [with] doped women and drunken men. I want you to put this matter in the hands of your most experienced men and whatever the cost will be, find out the truth about this Club and if it is as bad as I am informed prosecute it with the utmost rigour of the law’.

== Legacy ==
Occasionally modern nightclub ventures in London and elsewhere call themselves "Club 43" and other variations of the name in honour of this infamous 1920s venue.

A recreation of The 43 Club was part of the UK National Archives 2022 exhibition 20sPeople, which marked the release of the 1921 census. The layout was based on the plans of the club recorded as part of criminal proceedings, and held in the archives of the Metropolitan Police.
