= Tom Rachman =

English-Canadian author (born 1974)

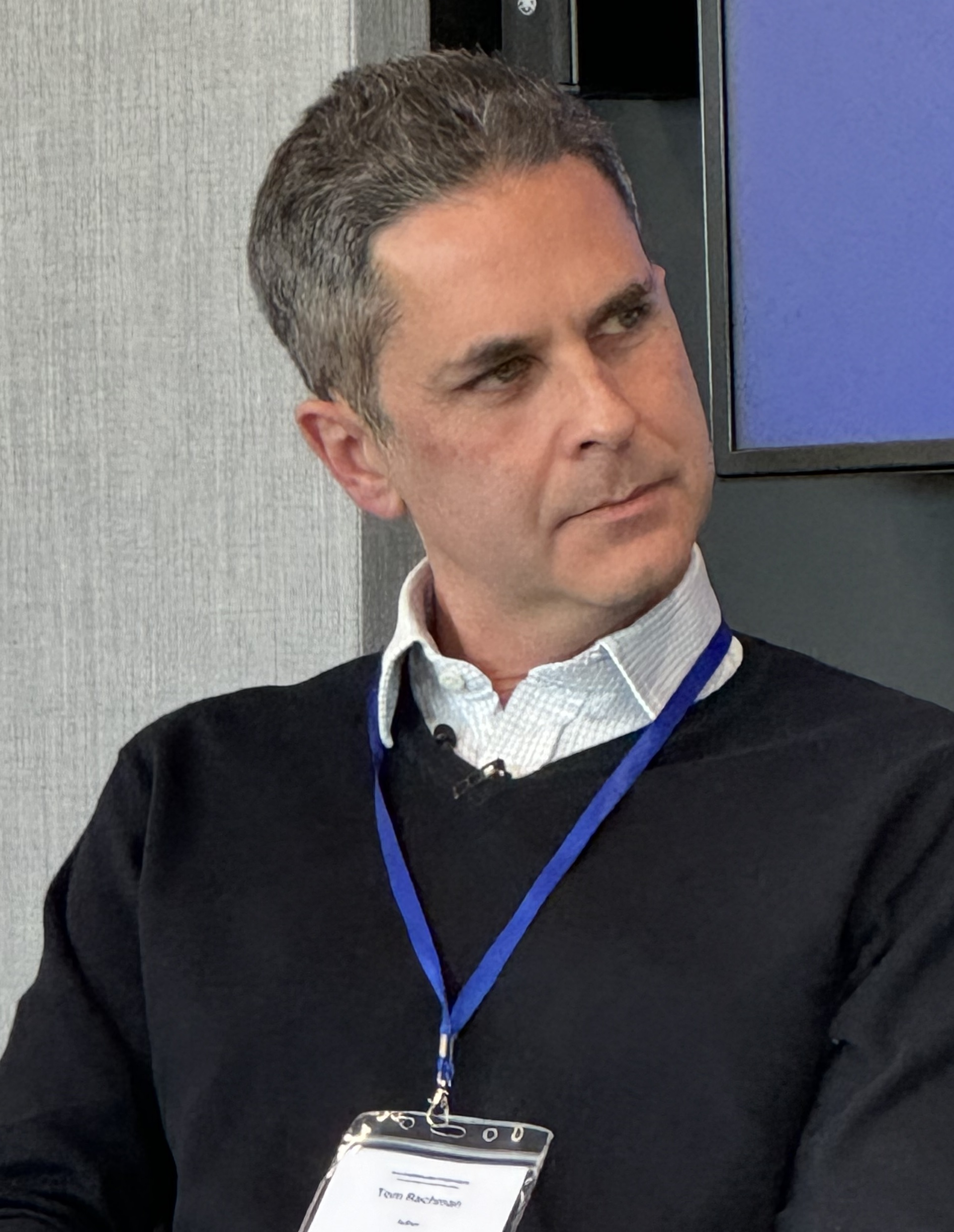
- Rachman in 2024
- Education: University of Toronto (BA); Columbia University (MA)
- Notable work: The Imperfectionists

Tom Rachman (born September 1974) is an English-Canadian author. His debut novel was The Imperfectionists (2010), about a group of journalists working in Rome during the collapse of the traditional news media. The book became a global bestseller, published in 25 languages, and Brad Pitt's production company, Plan B, optioned the film rights.

== Early life and education ==
Rachman was born in London, England, and grew up in Vancouver, Canada. He studied cinema at the University of Toronto and obtained a master's degree from Columbia University Graduate School of Journalism. Later, in his 40s, upon realizing that he didn't want to continue writing fiction, Rachman enrolled in a master's program in behavioral science at the London School of Economics.

== Career ==
Rachman's first job in journalism was as an editor of international news at Associated Press headquarters in New York. Later, he was sent to the Rome bureau as a foreign correspondent. He moved to Paris to write fiction, and worked there at the global edition of The New York Times, the International Herald Tribune. After publishing The Imperfectionists in 2010, he quit full-time journalism to write further novels while contributing non-fiction articles to The New York Times, The Washington Post, The Wall Street Journal, The New Yorker and The Atlantic, among other publications.

His novel The Italian Teacher, about the troubled son of a famous American painter, was nominated for the Costa Book Award for Novel. His collection of short stories, Basket of Deplorables, set during the Trump presidency, was nominated for the Edge Hill Short Story Prize. Rachman ghost-wrote the nonfiction book, We Are Bellingcat, with Eliot Higgins, founder of the online-investigative collective known for exposing Russian-state criminality, such as the Skripal poisoning.

Rachman currently lives in London, and is a contributing columnist to the Canadian newspaper The Globe & Mail. His writing has twice been included in the Best Canadian Essays anthologies, and was nominated for a 2024 National Newspaper Award.

== Personal life ==
His father was the psychologist Stanley Rachman, his brother is the Financial Times columnist Gideon Rachman, and his sister Carla is an art historian; their sister Emily died of breast cancer in 2012.

== Awards ==
Year	Title	Award	Category	Result	Ref.
2010	The Imperfectionists	Giller Prize	—	Longlisted	
2011	The Imperfectionists	Canadian Authors Association Award	Fiction	Won	
2012	The Imperfectionists	International Dublin Literary Award	—	Longlisted	
2015	The Rise & Fall of Great Powers	Maine Readers' Choice Award	—	Longlisted	
2018	Basket of Deplorables	Edge Hill Short Story Prize	—	Shortlisted	
2018	The Italian Teacher	Costa Book Awards	Novel	Shortlisted	

== Works ==
=== Fiction ===
- The Imperfectionists (2010)
- The Rise & Fall of Great Powers (2014)
- Basket of Deplorables (2017)
- The Italian Teacher (2018)
- The Imposters (2023)

=== Non-fiction ===
- We Are Bellingcat (2021) with Eliot Higgins

== Notes ==
- Christopher Buckley, "The Paper", The New York Times, 30 April 2010.
