= One Good Turn (novel) =

2006 novel by Kate Atkinson

- First edition
- Author: Kate Atkinson
- Cover artist: Neil Gower
- Language: English
- Series: Jackson Brodie
- Genre: Crime Fiction
- Publisher: Doubleday
- Publication date: 2006
- Publication place: United Kingdom
- Media type: Print, audio & ebook
- Pages: 400
- ISBN: 0-385-60800-4
- Preceded by: Case Histories
- Followed by: When Will There Be Good News?

One Good Turn (subtitled A Jolly Murder Mystery) is a 2006 crime novel by Kate Atkinson set in Edinburgh during the Festival. “People queuing for a lunchtime show witness a brutal road rage incident - an incident that changes the lives of everyone involved.” It is the second novel to feature former private investigator Jackson Brodie and is set two years after the earlier Case Histories.

== Principal characters ==
- Paul Bradley, lost in central Edinburgh, is driving a rented Peugeot when he brakes suddenly to avoid hitting a pedestrian who stepped out in front of his car
- Terence Smith a.k.a. 'Honda Man,' driving a Honda Civic, collides with the rear of the Peugeot and attacks the driver with a baseball bat, knocking Bradley unconscious
- Martin Canning, a successful author of crime novels (set in the 1940s and featuring a heroine called Nina Riley), witnesses the incident and throws his laptop bag at the attacker to stop him killing the prostrate driver. Honda Man does not respond but gets in his car and drives off
- Jackson Brodie, divorced ex policeman and now retired private detective, is visiting Edinburgh with his girlfriend Julia (featured in the first novel), who is appearing in a Fringe production. He witnesses the attack and leaves his telephone number with Martin
- Gloria Hatter, wife of millionaire builder Graham Hatter, under investigation for fraud
- Tatiana, a Russian call-girl seeing Graham Hatter
- Louise Munroe, a detective sergeant and single parent, who is called to Cramond Island to investigate a drowned woman and then becomes attracted to Jackson Brodie

== Reception ==
Reviews were mostly positive. Justine Jordan of The Guardian enjoyed the novel, saying

'the finale, when the cast are manoeuvred together for a violent climax and the inevitable expostulations of "You? Here? Why?", does not slot the pieces together as neatly as the Russian dolls which stud the novel might suggest. But the pleasure of One Good Turn lies in the ride, in Atkinson's wry, unvanquished characters, her swooping, savvy, sarcastic prose and authorial joie de vivre'.

Liesl Schillinger of the New York Times said, "Kate Atkinson shows again, in her inimitable bleakly funny way, how much easier it is to explain a death than to solve a life." In "no hurry to judge," Atkinson "acts like a hidden camera, dispassionately recording her characters’ deeds and misdeeds so they can indict themselves. Indeed, she has woven the technological accessories of the last 10 years into the fabric of her story, threading them through it like an invisible current into which the lives of all her characters are plugged."

But Amanda Craig writing in The Independent says

'Unlike its dark and dazzling predecessor, One Good Turn is neither a good literary novel nor a satisfying detective story, though it had the potential to have been both'.

This novel was “shortlisted for the British Book Awards Crime Thriller of the Year.”

== Adaptations ==
The novel was adapted for television with two other of Atkinson's Brodie series for the BBC in 2011 with the overall title Case Histories. This novel was covered as the second two parts of the series.

=== Cast ===
- Jason Isaacs as Jackson Brodie
- Simon Weir as Paul Bradley
- Brian McCardie as Terence Smith
- Adam Godley as Martin Canning
- Marion Bailey as Gloria Hatter
- Amanda Abbington as Louise Monroe
