= Shrines of Gaiety =

Novel by Kate Atkinson

- First edition
- Author: Kate Atkinson
- Language: English
- Publisher: Doubleday
- Publication date: 2022
- Publication place: United Kingdom
- Pages: 448
- ISBN: 978-0857526557

Shrines of Gaiety is a novel by British author Kate Atkinson, published in 2022 by Doubleday.

== Plot ==
Set in London in the Roaring Twenties, the book centres on the infamous London nightclubs owned by Nellie Coker (loosely based on Kate Meyrick, the 1920's London nightclub proprietor) and her son Niven, the latter having returned from fighting in the Somme in World War I. Their movements are carefully watched by police inspector Frobisher. Librarian and former combat nurse Gwendolen Kelling is approached by an old friend asking her to track down her missing teenage daughters in London. Kelling enlists Frobisher's help, and their hunt leads them to Coker's nightclubs.

== Reception ==
Anthony Quinn of The Guardian found "a slight disappointment" in what he called "the slapdash ending", but added that "Nonetheless, this book is one to savour, for the energy, for the wit, for the tenderness of characterisation that make Atkinson enduringly popular."

Anthony Cummins of The Guardian praised "the suppleness that enables Atkinson to segue from scenes of pitch-dark horror to a brisk 'what everyone did next' coda without sugar-coating the tale’s bitter kernel: it’s a peak performance of consummate control."

Leah Greenblatt wrote in the New York Times that the novel

...doesn’t surprise in the thrilling sui generis way of “Behind the Scenes” or “Life After Life”; no thunderclap revelations à la “Case Histories” arrive in the flurry of postscripts and ever-afters that make up its final pages. It lands instead as light refreshment; a cocktail of fizz and melancholy, generously poured.

Sarah Chihaya of The New Yorker wrote that

The book’s base ingredient is research-packed historical fiction, but there’s also a generous measure of mystery, a dash of romance, and a barely there float of playful authorial provocation. Like the sherry flip that one of its characters orders, this concoction is rich, frothy, but safely lightweight.
