= Monique Roffey =

Trinidadian-born British writer (born 1965)

Monique Roffey FRSL
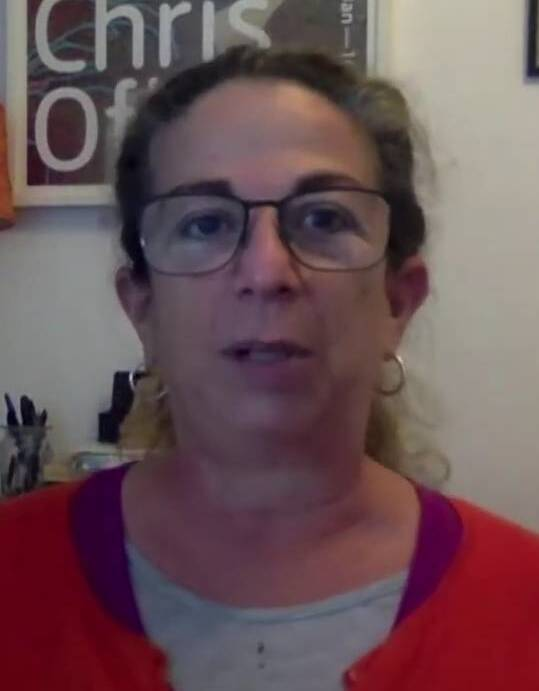
- Roffey in 2021
- Born: 1965 (age 60–61); Port of Spain, Trinidad
- Education: University of East Anglia (BA); Lancaster University (MA; PhD)
- Notable work: The White Woman on the Green Bicycle (2009); Archipelago (2012); The Mermaid of Black Conch (2020)
- Awards: OCM Bocas Prize for Caribbean Literature; Costa Book of the Year award

Monique Pauline Roffey FRSL (born 1965) is a Trinidadian-born British writer and memoirist. Her novels have been much acclaimed, winning awards including the 2013 OCM Bocas Prize for Caribbean Literature, for Archipelago, and the Costa Book of the Year award, for The Mermaid of Black Conch in 2021.

== Biography ==
Born in Port of Spain Roffey was educated at St Andrew's School in Maraval, Trinidad, and then in the UK at St Maur's Convent, and St George's College, Weybridge. She graduated with a BA in English and Film Studies from the University of East Anglia in 1987, and later completed an MA and PhD in Creative Writing at Lancaster University. Between 2002 and 2006 she was a Centre Director for the Arvon Foundation.

Roffey is an experienced creative writing tutor and has taught for numerous creative writing providers and organisations, including The National Writers Centre, First Story, The Arvon Foundation and English PEN. She is a Professor of Contemporary Fiction at Manchester Metropolitan University, teaching creative writing on the novel route MA. Since 2013, she has been a literary activist and advocate for emerging writers in Trinidad, teaching for COSTAATT, Bocas Lit Fest and privately in Port of Spain, where she set up the St James Writers' Room in 2014 and numerous other writing workshops since. She has also co-led writing retreats in Trinidad in collaboration with other Caribbean writers such as Professor Loretta Collins-Klobah in partnership with Mount Plaisir Estate in Grande Riviere, Trinidad. Roffey has dual nationality, British and Trinidadian. She is a Fellow of the Royal Society of Literature and a co-founder of the group Writers Rebel inside Extinction Rebellion. She is also a mitra of the Triratna Buddhist order.

== Literary career ==
Roffey has written six novels and a memoir. Sun Dog (2002), set in west London, is a magical realist tale of psychological estrangement, identity loss and subsequent individuation. The White Woman on the Green Bicycle (2009; shortlisted for the 2010 Orange Prize and the 2011 Encore Award), is the story of European ex-colonials living in Trinidad during the island's early Independence years and their subsequent process of creolisation. It was hailed by Commonwealth Prize-winner Olive Senior, who said:

"…it breaks entirely new ground. It is a major contribution to the New Wave of Caribbean writing: energetic, uncompromising, bold in the choice of narrative devices and a great read."

It has been published to critical acclaim in the UK, United States and Europe.

Roffey's 2011 memoir, With the Kisses of His Mouth, is a personal account of a mid-life quest for sexual liberation and self-identification other than the aspirant hetero-normative model. It has been characterised as "a subversive work that transcends the author's personal story: it stands alone in the chasm that has opened between feminist literature and the belles du jour brigade."

Her novel Archipelago, published in July 2012, is set in the aftermath of a flood and examines climate change from the perspective of a man from the southern Caribbean. Andrew Miller (Costa Award winner, 2011) said: "Archipelago is beautifully done. There's a warmth to it, an exuberance and a wisdom, that makes the experience of reading it feel not just pleasurable but somehow instructive. It's funny, sometimes bitingly poignant. And how well Roffey writes a male central character. A brilliant piece of storytelling." Archipelago won the 2013 OCM Bocas Prize for Caribbean Literature, whose judges commended it for its "exploration of the greater Caribbean space in which is embedded a real-life story of trauma and loss and ultimately redemption that is both contemporary and compelling". The novel was judged the winner of the fiction category of the prize, and at the Bocas Lit Fest was announced on 27 April 2013 as the best overall book from all categories.

Roffey's 2014 novel, House of Ashes, is a fictionalised account of the events surrounding the 1990 attempted coup in Trinidad. Ronald Adamolekun, for Wasafiri magazine, said: House of Ashes will be remembered as the most authoritative fictionalised account of the 1990 Trinidad and Tobago revolution, arguably the darkest moment of the island’s history."

The Telegraph called it "vigorous, grimly absorbing tale", while The Observer's reviewer concluded: "Roffey's writing is raw and visceral and she thrusts her readers headlong into the very middle of the action, her pen as powerful as the butts of the guns shoved in her hostages' backs."

A fifth novel, The Tryst, published in July 2017, was sold twice, first to Simon & Schuster UK, and then to independent press Dodo Ink. Roffey worked on it, on and off, for 14 years. In it, she revisits the tale of Adam's first wife, Lilith, and examines the common but taboo issue of celibacy within marriage. Like much of Roffey's work, it weaves magical realism into a contemporary setting. Many well-known literary writers, sex writers and sex workers have applauded The Tryst. DBC Pierre said of it: "Not a shade of grey within a mile of this book. What makes The Tryst an unexploded virus isn't just the quality and brightness of Roffey's writing on sex, even as it uncovers inner glades between flesh and fantasy where sex resides – but the taunting clarity of why those glades stay covered. A throbbing homewrecker of a tale, too late to call Fifty Shades of Red." Hollywood actor Gabriel Byrne said, "The Tryst is a gorgeously written page-turner, deceptive in its simplicity. Monique Roffey writes an erotically charged fable that mixes the real with the mythological, a truly unsettling and disturbing novel. She writes about lust and sex in a way that is thrillingly sexy and beautiful."

Rowan Pelling, editor of The Amorist, also said: "The Tryst is a sly, feral, witty, offbeat erotic novella that unsettles the reader, even as it arouses. There are sex scenes of breathtaking audacity. What would any of us do if an irresistible sex daemon broke and entered our domestic lives, leaving havoc in her amoral wake? Monique Roffey knows that the real question about human desire is whether we even recognise our deepest yearnings. How can anyone resist what they have never even dreamt of?"

The Mermaid of Black Conch was first published in April 2020 by Peepal Tree Press. It won the 2020 Costa Book Award for Novel and Costa Book of the Year and was shortlisted for the Rathbones/Folio Prize (2021), the Goldsmiths Prize (2020), and the Republic of Consciousness Prize (2021). The novel was published in paperback by Vintage Books, in June 2021. it featured on the BBC Radio 4 programme A Book at Bedtime in August 2021. Dorothy Street Pictures bought the film rights and a screen adaptation will be developed by Film Four. In 2026, Cambridge International added the novel to its major update of texts that can be studied for AS- and A-level literature in English from 2029.

Roffey's follow-up to The Mermaid of Black Conch was 2024's Passiontide. Inspired by a real-life case of femicide, it was described by Kit Fan in The Guardian as "a mission-driven novel with an upfront political agenda....a devastating critique of the interrelationship between religion, sexism and colonialism." Lindsey Hilsum's review in the Times Literary Supplement stated that while the book "has a strong feminist, anti-racist message, Roffey avoids preachiness", concluding: "In her author’s note Monique Roffey points out that, according to the NGO Womankind Worldwide, 81,000 girls and women are killed every year – half of them by an intimate partner or family member. Passiontide is a distinctly Trinidadian novel, but it could have been set anywhere."

== Style and themes ==
A writer of dual nationality and perspective, Roffey writes about sex, fatherhood, the Caribbean, mermaids, Lilith and other outcasts, be they the terminally awkward August Chalmin (in Sun Dog), the left-behind Europeans in Trinidad (George and Sabine Harwood in The White Woman on the Green Bicycle), a cursed mermaid, a celibate wife or indeed herself. Stylistically, her books can be linked in terms of post-modern narrative choices, in that they often weave together magical realism, real-life historical characters and events, biography and autobiography to tackle themes of alienation and otherness.

== Publications ==
=== Novels ===
- Sun Dog (2002), Scribner, Simon & Schuster UK
- The White Woman on the Green Bicycle (2009), Simon & Schuster UK
- Archipelago (2012), Simon & Schuster UK
- House of Ashes (2014), Simon & Schuster UK
- The Tryst (2017), Dodo Ink
- The Mermaid of Black Conch (2020), Peepal Tree Press.
- Passiontide (2024), Harvill Secker.

=== Memoir ===
- With the Kisses of His Mouth (2011), Simon & Schuster UK.

=== As editor ===
- The Global Village, Tell Tales (2009), Peepal Tree Press.

=== Selected shorter writings ===
- "Finale" (short story; 2005), in New Writing 13, Picador.
- "'Please sit down, I have something shocking to say…'", The Guardian, 18 June 2011.
- "Women and sex: intimate adventurers", The Guardian, Comment is free, 6 July 2011.
- "The Essay: Why do women who dare to write about their sexual life still face the pillory?", The Independent, 15 September 2012.
- "Private Notes Made Public – An Essay", Caribbean Quarterly, Volume 62, December, 2016.
- "Lotus, Nun, Mysterious: some brief notes, at 51, of a hetaera woman", Advantages of Age, August 2016.
- "I was 41, single and looking for pleasure", The Times, 27 June 2017.
- "So long to my sexless life - now I'm out of the sexual mainstream I finally feel alive", The Telegraph, 3 July 2017.

== Awards ==
=== Honours ===
- 2022: Elected a Fellow of the Royal Society of Literature

=== Literary awards ===
- 2010: Orange Prize, shortlisted for The White Woman on the Green Bicycle
- 2011: Encore Award, shortlisted for The White Woman on the Green Bicycle
- 2013: OCM Bocas Prize for Caribbean Literature, winner of overall and fiction categories for Archipelago
- 2014: Orion Book Award, shortlisted for Archipelago
- 2015: Costa Book Awards shortlisted for House of Ashes
- 2015: OCM Bocas Prize for Caribbean Literature, longlist, fiction, for House of Ashes
- 2020: Goldsmiths Prize, shortlisted for The Mermaid of Black Conch
- 2021: Costa Book of the Year award for The Mermaid of Black Conch
- 2021: Rathbones Folio Prize, shortlisted for The Mermaid of Black
- 2021: Republic of Consciousness Prize, shortlisted for The Mermaid of Black Conch
- 2021: Orwell Prize for Political Fiction, longlisted for The Mermaid of Black Conch
- 2021: Ondaatje Prize (for writing that evokes the "spirit of a place"), longlisted for The Mermaid of Black Conch
- 2021: OCM Bocas Fiction Award, shortlisted for The Mermaid of Black Conch
