= Big Sky (novel) =

Crime novel

- First edition
- Author: Kate Atkinson
- Language: English
- Publisher: Doubleday
- Publication date: 2019
- Publication place: United Kingdom
- Pages: 352
- ISBN: 0-857-52610-3

Big Sky is a novel by British author Kate Atkinson published in 2019 by Doubleday. It is the fifth novel featuring private investigator Jackson Brodie, released nine years since the last in the series.

== Plot ==
Jackson has separated from his partner Julia and now lives in a village on the coast of North Yorkshire with the occasional company of his teenage son, Nathan, and an aging Labrador, Dido. He is still a private investigator, mostly his clients asking him to investigate suspicious spouses. He then has a chance rescue of a man on a clifftop. Jackson is then involved in a plot involving human trafficking and murder. With several of the characters from previous outings making appearances in the new novel.

== Reception ==
- Sam Leith writing in The Guardian is generally positive: "It's a credit to Atkinson’s dexterity that despite these clashes of tone and register the novel manages to hang together, even though the subject matter – child sexual abuse, human trafficking – and the essentially comic mechanisms of the plot, its coincidences and confrontations, seem to be at odds. How seriously are we to take it all? Atkinson artfully avoids supplying or implying an answer."
- Janet Maslin from The New York Times is also positive: "it's worth rereading the beginning once you’ve finished this novel just to see how well the author has manipulated you. Atkinson is also adept at weaving the mundane details of her characters’ lives (or perhaps her own) into the Brodie books as a way of humanizing them, despite the stark malevolence that lurks beneath this workaday surface...Brodie has been Atkinson’s most popular character for good reason. He was interestingly broken, so she hasn't fixed him...Atkinson tells a great story, toys with expectations, deceives by omission, blows smoke and also writes like she's your favourite friend. Thank goodness the long Jackson Brodie hiatus is over.
- Susie Boyt of the Financial Times says that "Big Sky is a curious mixture: a detective novel about the sorry state of the UK, an exasperated celebration of blended family life and a meditation on loss, adversity, damage and repair. The world Big Sky gives us is depraved and craven, crammed with sorrow and exploitation, but there are also tremendous acts of courage, tight bonds of love, wise country songs and silly jokes...For this reader (and writer), more interested in texture and character than plot, the mounting tension in the novel is less appealing than the well-made characters and their histories, diversions and asides."
- Holly Williams writing in The Independent has a few misgivings and explains that "Jackson Brodie has been away for nine years – but now Kate Atkinson's private detective is back, older too and somewhat world-weary. But he's still got a habit of ending up in the thick of things – and in this case, in a thicket of very tangled plot strands. Almost every character (and there’s quite the cast) has a history that simply won't stay put...Atkinson’s work is always playful, and there’s a brisk, jaunty tone to Big Sky and much dry observational comedy. Her characters have their own, distinctly British gallows humour, and there are blackly comic asides in even the most heinous of situations...There’s a lot going on in Big Sky, and it can get bogged down in allusions to previous stories, especially from Brodie’s past (often delivered in parentheses). These half unpotted case histories feel unnecessary for existing fans, cumbersome for new readers...While this focus on character means Big Sky can lack the relentless propulsion associated with crime writing, getting to know a plethora of her tenacious, memorable characters seems like a fair trade, especially as they gently offer hope that, in the end, good will out."
