= The Sacred and Profane Love Machine =

Novel by Iris Murdoch

- First British edition cover
- Author: Iris Murdoch
- Cover artist: John Sutcliffe
- Language: English
- Publisher: Chatto & Windus
- Publication date: 1974
- Publication place: United Kingdom
- Media type: Print (Hardcover)
- Pages: 327
- ISBN: 0701120150
- OCLC: 466353218

The Sacred and Profane Love Machine is a novel by Iris Murdoch. Published in 1974, it was her sixteenth novel. It won the Whitbread Novel Award for 1974.

== Plot ==
Blaise Gavender is a psychotherapist with a wife and a sixteen-year-old son, living near London in a comfortable home called Hood House. Unknown to his wife Harriet, he has been having an affair with another woman, Emily McHugh, for nine years, and Blaise and Emily have an eight-year-old son named Luca. Blaise is finally forced to tell Harriet about Emily when Luca secretly visits Hood House and the truth threatens to come out. Blaise vacillates between the two women, hoping to be able to maintain relations with both, but eventually he chooses to leave Harriet and live with Emily.

Montague (Monty) Small, the Gavenders' neighbour and family friend, is a popular detective novelist whose wife Sophie has recently died. He knew about Blaise's affair and helped him by inventing a fictitious patient who required overnight visits to London, thus providing Blaise with an excuse to be away from home when visiting Emily. After Harriet finds out about the affair, the still grieving Monty is called upon to be her confidant as well. Monty's friend Edgar Demarnay, who was in love with Sophie, arrives on the scene and becomes embroiled in the situation, trying to "save" both Monty, whose grief threatens to cause an emotional breakdown, and Harriet, whose part he takes against Blaise.

Harriet is in the airport attempting to leave the country with Luca when a terrorist attack takes place. She dies shielding Luca from the attack.

== Title ==
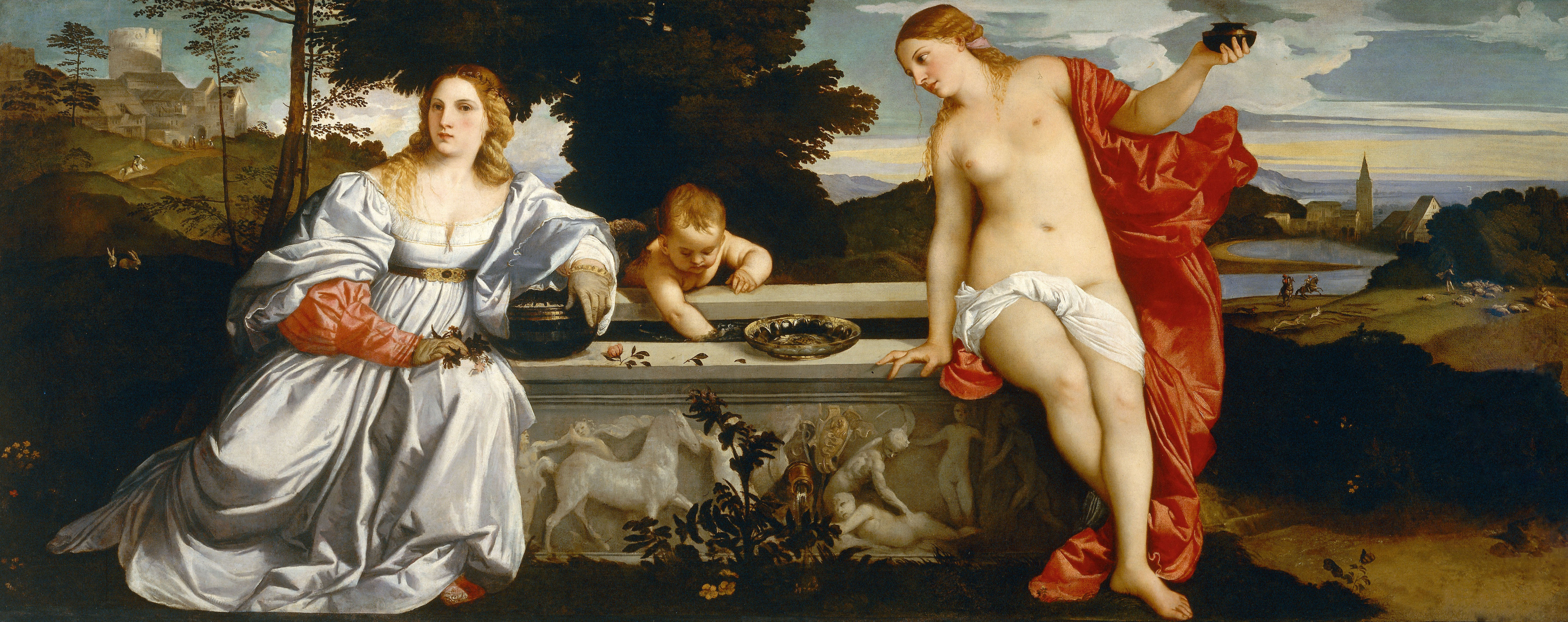
Titian - Sacred and Profane Love

The title is a reference to Titian's painting Sacred and Profane Love, which was used as the basis for the first edition's cover. Peter J. Conradi notes that Titian's painting is a "puzzle painting" in that a single model is shown both nude and elaborately dressed, so that the boundary between sacred and profane love is unclear. Rather, they are presented as "cases of a single principle of Eros in two different modes of existence and in two grades of perfection".

== Major themes ==
Doubleness is an important theme of the novel. Blaise has relationships with two women, who initially inhabit two separate spheres of life. Each of them has one son. The book has two main male characters, Monty and Blaise, both of whom have snobbish mothers. Both Monty and Blaise, while financially successful, are dissatisfied with their professions and contemplate changing them. Monty sees himself as a schoolmaster, while Blaise wants to become a doctor. The theme of doubleness extends to the two types of love, sacred and profane. Blaise feels "that Harriet was his sacred love and Emily his profane" He sees himself as leading "a double life" and as "a man of two truths, since both these lives were valuable and true".

The Sacred and Profane Love Machine is one of four Murdoch novels that take male adultery as a major theme. Harriet, Emily, and Blaise are all given narrative focus, and are all treated somewhat sympathetically by the author. However, Blaise's egotism and moral failure are clear throughout.

The novel contains descriptions of at least twenty dreams that are recalled by Harriet, Monty, Blaise and Harriet's son David. These dreams are disturbing and frightening, combining "some mixture of horror or terror, grief and fascinated pity". The subject of dreams is also relevant to Blaise's work as a psychoanalyst.

== Literary significance and reception ==
The Sacred and Profane Love Machine was widely and generally favourably reviewed, and won the 1974 Whitbread Novel Award. The London Magazine found it "another example of the most individual collection of novels, sixteen now, since Dickens". The Time reviewer called it a "glittering examination of love's disguises in the London suburbs" and a "deliberately humorless antifarce" and compared its narrative tone to that of John Updike's 1968 novel Couples.

Several contemporary reviewers commented on the title. John Wain pointed out that Blaise's "sacred" love for Harriet is characterized by "selfishness and possessiveness", while his erotic "profane" attachment to Emily has "a depth and a purity, in some ways self-forgetfulness", making a clear moral distinction between the two states impossible. The Time reviewer saw the title as indicating Murdoch's intention of "exploring mind's mechanistic aspect". Martin Amis found the title "the most consistently provocative thing" about the novel. It is too simple, he concluded, to equate Harriet and Emily with sacred and profane love respectively, and to see them as opposites. Instead, Amis suggested that Murdoch's point is that the two varieties of love are interdependent.

Murdoch biographer and scholar Peter Conradi describes The Sacred and Profane Love Machine and Henry and Cato (1976) as "two lesser but still undismissible works" from "the time of Murdoch's great flowering". The philosopher Martha Nussbaum focussed on The Sacred and Profane Love Machine in her analysis of Murdoch's Platonic views of sexual desire.
