= Kate Atkinson (writer) =

English author (born 1951)

Kate Atkinson MBE
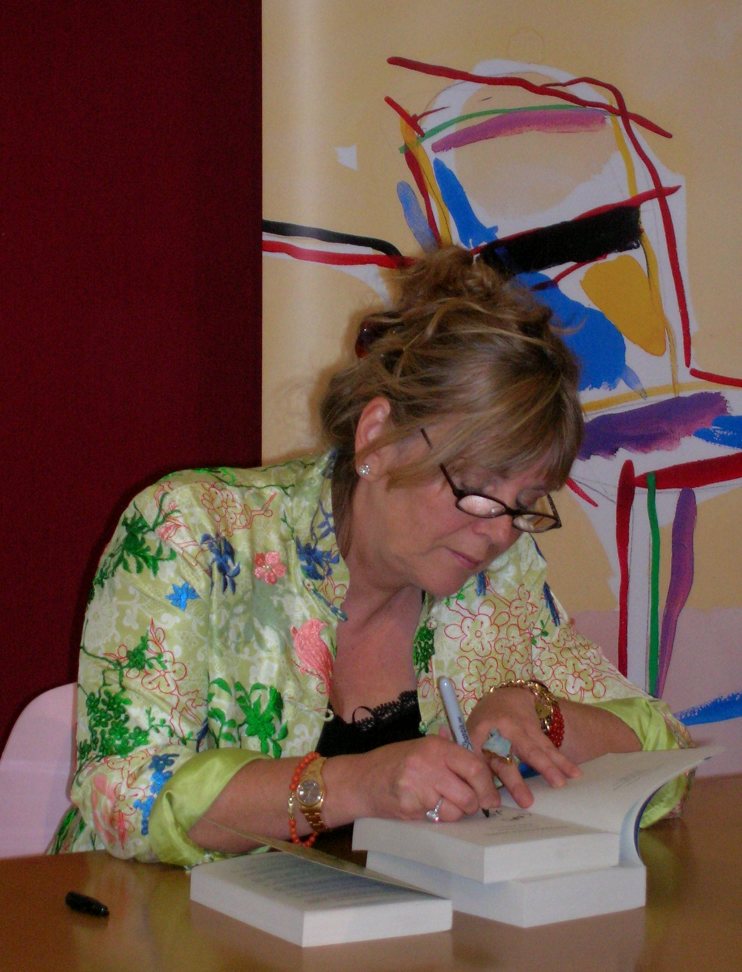
- Atkinson signing books at the Edinburgh International Book Festival (August 2007)
- Born: 20 December 1951 (age 74); York, England
- Education: University of Dundee
- Occupations: Novelist; short story writer
- Children: 2
- Website: kateatkinson.co.uk

Kate Atkinson (born 20 December 1951) is an English writer of novels, plays and short stories. She has written historical novels, detective novels and family novels, incorporating postmodern and magical realist elements into the plots. Her debut, Behind the Scenes at the Museum, won the Whitbread Book Award, the precursor to the Costa Book Award, in 1995. The novels Life After Life and A God in Ruins won the Costa Book Award for Novel in 2013 and 2015. She is also known for the Jackson Brodie series of detective novels, which has been adapted into the BBC One series Case Histories.

== Biography ==
The daughter of a shopkeeper, Atkinson was born in York, the setting for several of her books. She was an only child and describes herself as having been an anxious child. Her parents lived together but were not married because her mother could not divorce her first husband, which was considered scandalous at the time.

She studied English literature at the University of Dundee, gaining her master's degree in 1974. Atkinson subsequently studied for a doctorate in American literature, with a thesis titled The post-modern American short story in its historical context. She failed her thesis defence; however, the experience became a defining moment that led to her becoming a writer of fiction.

After leaving university, she took on a variety of jobs, from care worker to legal secretary and teacher, until her breakthrough as a writer in 1995.

Atkinson was appointed a Member of the Order of the British Empire (MBE) in the 2011 Birthday Honours for services to literature. In 2015, she became the first author to win a Costa Book Award three times when her book A God in Ruins won the Novel of the Year award.

On 30 November 2018, she was the guest on BBC Radio 4's Desert Island Discs. She currently lives in the Grange district of Edinburgh.

== Writing career ==
Atkinson was in her thirties when she began writing short stories. One of her stories won a prize in a Woman's Own writing contest in 1986, which encouraged her to continue writing, and she published stories in several magazines and newspapers. In 1993, she won the Ian St. James Award for the story "Karmic Mothers: Fact or Fiction?", a story about two women who are both recovering from a suicide attempt in a hospital room next to the maternity ward. In 1997, the story was adapted for television.

In 1995 she published her first novel, the tragicomic Behind the Scenes at the Museum. Through the lens of the childhood memories of a young woman named Ruby Lennox, the novel tells the story of a family during World War I and World War II. The book was a Sunday Times bestseller and established her name as a writer. Behind the Scenes at the Museum was awarded the Whitbread Prize in the categories for first novel and for overall book of the year. The latter led to some commotion in the media; the debut novel by the unknown Atkinson had been selected over the winner in the novel category, The Moor's Last Sigh by Salman Rushdie. Behind the Scenes at the Museum has been adapted for radio and stage.

In her next two novels, Human Croquet (1997) and Emotionally Weird (2000), Atkinson experimented with different stylistic elements and narrative techniques. In Emotionally Weird, for example, she uses different fonts to distinguish characters and locations. In 2000, her play Abandonment premiered in Edinburgh. In 2002 she published a collection of short stories entitled Not the End of the World.

In 2004, Case Histories, a novel centered around private investigator Jackson Brodie, was published; he was Atkinson's first male protagonist. Three more Brodie novels followed: One Good Turn (2006), When Will There Be Good News? (2008) and Started Early, Took My Dog (2010). The series was adapted for television with Jason Isaacs as Jackson Brodie.

In 2009, she donated the short story "Lucky We Live Now" to Oxfam's Ox-Tales project, which consisted of four collections of UK stories written by 38 authors. Atkinson's story was published in the Earth collection.

She followed up the Brodie series with three novels set during World War II. The successful novel Life After Life (2013) is a combination of science fiction, historical novel and psychological fiction. Over the course of the story, the main character Ursula Todd dies several times, only to be born again and again in the year 1910 and start her life anew. In each new life, Ursula makes choices that influence the course of history. Life After Life received the Costa Book Award for Novel in 2013, and was adapted for television in 2022.

Atkinson's next novel A God in Ruins (2015) follows the life of Ursula's brother Teddy Todd, a pilot in the Royal Air Force during the war, but the novel is more realistic than Life After Life. This book also won the Costa Book Award for Novel. Life After Life was more critically and popularly successful because of its originality and unusual structure, but Atkinson considers A God in Ruins her best work.

The main character of Transcription (2018) is a woman who worked for MI5 during World War II.

Big Sky, Atkinson's fifth novel centered around detective Jackson Brodie, was published in 2019. The storyline of Big Sky was originally intended for a TV series about a female detective, to be played by Victoria Wood. After Wood's unexpected death in 2016, Atkinson decided to use the plot for the next novel in her Brodie cycle.

Shrines of Gaiety (2022) is set in the London nightclub milieu shortly after World War I. Normal Rules Don't Apply (2023) was her first collection of short stories since 2002. In 2024 Death at the Sign of the Rook was published, the sixth Jackson Brodie novel, conceived during the COVID-19 pandemic. The story is set in an English country house; it pays homage to Agatha Christie and other writers from Golden Age of Detective Fiction between World War I and World War II. Our Noble Selves (2026) is a mystery set behind the scenes of the 1951 Festival of Britain.

== Style and themes ==
In Kate Atkinson's novels and stories, much is not what it seems at first glance. She combines the conventional forms of the historical novel, detective novel and family novel with postmodern or magical realist elements. The role of chance in life is a recurring theme in her stories. Her books present a succession of unexpected events and extraordinary characters. Main characters sometimes face periods of mental confusion or amnesia. Atkinson also plays with the chronology of events, both within one book and between different books. Some characters return as older or younger versions of themselves. Problems experienced in the present are often caused by painful past events, that sometimes have been concealed for generations.

Atkinson has said that she believes it is not possible to write a novel about happy people who are just busy being happy. In her work, especially in the Brodie cycle, she also refers to current events. The theme of justice plays an important role in her stories.

Her books contain humor and the narrative tone of voice is often mildly ironic.

== Works ==
=== Novels ===
- Behind the Scenes at the Museum (1995) – winner of the 1995 Whitbread Prize for first novel and overall book of the year
- Human Croquet (1997)
- Emotionally Weird (2000)
- Life After Life (2013) – winner of the 2013 Costa Book Award for Novel
- A God in Ruins (2015) – winner of the 2015 Costa Book Award for Novel
- Transcription (2018)
- Shrines of Gaiety (2022)
- Our Noble Selves (2026)

=== Novels featuring Jackson Brodie ===
- Case Histories (2004)
- One Good Turn (2006)
- When Will There Be Good News? (2008)
- Started Early, Took My Dog (2010)
- Big Sky (2019)
- Death at the Sign of the Rook (2024)

=== Plays ===
- Nice (1996)
- Abandonment (2000)

=== Story collections ===
- Not the End of the World (2002)
- Normal Rules Don't Apply (2023)

=== Television adaptations ===
The first four Jackson Brodie novels were adapted for the BBC under the series titled Case Histories, featuring Jason Isaacs as Brodie.

In 2015, Shonda Rhimes developed a pilot called The Catch, based on a treatment written by Atkinson, and starring Mireille Enos.

Her 2013 novel Life After Life was turned into a BBC drama of the same name in 2022, with Thomasin McKenzie in the role of Ursula.

== Awards and honours ==
As of 2019, Atkinson has asked her publishers to stop submitting her books for awards. She has stated that, for her, meeting her own quality standards is what matters.

- 1995 Whitbread Award for First Novel and Overall Book of the Year, Behind the Scenes at the Museum
- 1997 Lire Best Book of the Year, Behind the scenes at the Museum
- 1998 E.M. Forster Award
- 2005 Saltire Society Literary Award for Scottish Book of the Year, Case Histories
- 2009 Crime Thriller Awards Gold Dagger, When Will There Be Good News? (nominated)
- 2009 British Book Award for Richard & Judy Best Read of the Year, When Will There Be Good News?
- 2010 Fellow of the Royal Society of Literature
- 2013 Costa Book Award for Novel, Life After Life
- 2014 Walter Scott Prize, Life After Life (shortlist)
- 2014 South Bank Sky Arts Award, Life after Life
- 2015 Costa Book Award for Novel, A God in Ruins
- 2025 Saltire Society Lifetime Achievement Award

== See also ==
- List of British playwrights
- List of English novelists
- List of female detective/mystery writers
- List of people from Edinburgh
- List of people from York
- List of short story authors
