= Not the End of the World (short story collection) =

2002 short story collection by Kate Atkinson

- First edition
- Author: Kate Atkinson
- Language: English
- Publisher: Doubleday
- Publication date: November 2002
- Publication place: United Kingdom
- Media type: Print, audiobook and audible, ebook and kindle
- Pages: 278 pp
- ISBN: 9780385604727
- OCLC: 469945377
- Dewey Decimal: 823/.914
- LC Class: PR6051.T56 N68 2002

Not the End of the World is a short story collection by British writer Kate Atkinson. It is mostly set in Scotland, and is an experiment in magical realism. The collection was first published in 2002 by Doubleday.

It contains 12 loosely connected stories:

1. "Charlene and Trudi Go Shopping": Two women obsessively make unreal and bizarre lists, managing to lead apparently normal lives, oblivious to the reality around them which is of the city being torn apart by an apocalyptic war.
2. "Tunnel of Fish": A pregnant mother living in Edinburgh with her partner Hawk, worries about her fish-obsessed son Eddie and reminisces about the past including her first holiday abroad to Crete during which Eddie was conceived; she has a vivid memory of being dragged down to the Mediterranean sea-bed and ravaged by an undersea god. On his birthday Eddie is taken to Deep Sea World where in the undersea tunnel he receives a message from a giant carp.
3. "Transparent Fiction": Meredith Zane (one of the Zane sisters) is working her way around Europe but has come to a halt in London where she finds herself living with Fletcher, a writer for a television soap Green Acres. The night before she plans to leave Fletcher and continue her tour they are invited to a dinner party by a television producer at which Meredith meets Merle Goldeman who appears to have been alive for millennia. Meredith determines to steal the secret of eternal life for herself.
4. "Dissonance": Rebecca and Simon live with their divorced mother Pam. Simon spends most of his time in his room playing Tekken 3 on his PlayStation, listening to Korn and 'Boak' on his stereo and making occasional trips out to shoplift and skateboard. Rebecca in contrast is studying hard for her highers listening to classical music, and plans to study medicine at university.
5. "Sheer Big Waste of Love": Addison Fox was orphaned at the age of eight. His mother, a prostitute dying of cancer, attempts to reunite Addison with his father, a successful local businessman. As a result of this meeting Addison, his mother and an innocent bystander end up in casualty.
6. "Unseen Translation": Missy has just become nanny for Arthur, the eight-year-old son of glamour model Romney Wright and the lead singer of a rock band 'Boak'. Arthur's father is on tour in Germany and Missy is to take Arthur to visit him.
7. "Evil Doppelgangers": Fielding, who is media correspondent for a newspaper, suspects he has a doppelganger who is having far more fun than himself and creating havoc in the process. Fielding resolves to track him down.
8. "The Cat Lover": After breaking up with her boyfriend Fletcher (a television scriptwriter), Heidi is followed home by a dishevelled cat. She names the cat Gordon and it soon takes over her flat, eating more and more food and growing ever larger, until Heidi wonders when she will be eaten herself. Gordon also becomes more and more human and eventually begins sleeping in Heidi's bed.
9. "The Bodies Vest": Vincent is well acquainted with death. He remembers his father falling from the fourth-floor window he was trying to clean. And then the death of his new wife (one of the Zane sisters) who died whilst having a wisdom tooth extracted. Her father (a dentist) then kills himself.
10. "Temporal Anomaly": Marianne dies in a road accident on the M9. She wakes to find herself sitting on the hard shoulder and stumbles into the nearby Little Chef but cannot make herself noticed, then she walks the four miles home.
11. "Wedding Favours": Pam's son Simon has now left home. Soon Pam finds herself in business with her friend Maggie producing wedding favours.
12. "Pleasureland": Charlene and Trudi (from the first story in the collection) soon find themselves boarded up in Trudi's flat, the whole building being declared a plague area. With electricity failing and food running out they tell each other tales of the Greek gods. The narrative ends with Trudi telling Charlene "Don't worry, it's not the end of the world".

== Release ==
The collection was first released in the UK via Doubleday in November 2002. It came to America in hardcover thanks to Little, Brown by December 2003. An audio cassette was released shortly thereafter, narrated by Geraldine James . Back Bay Books released kindle / ebook versions on 30 May 2009.

== Critical response ==
In a neutral review, The Independent said, "Atkinson has a love of words and takes delight in the sheer manipulation of them, but mostly these are idea-oriented stories that sacrifice warmth and fail to stick. There is an overload of cross-referencing and the multitudinous cast are, for the most part, so unmemorable that you keep coming over names of people you know you've met before, but can't put an identity to."
