= The Mermaid of Black Conch =

2020 novel by Monique Roffey

- First edition
- Author: Monique Roffey
- Language: English
- Publisher: Peepal Tree Press
- Publication date: 2 April 2020
- Pages: 272
- ISBN: 978-1-84523-457-7
- OCLC: 1260160139

The Mermaid of Black Conch is the sixth novel by Monique Roffey, published in 2020.

== Development ==
Roffey first conceived of the novel's mermaid during a 2013 trip to Charlotteville, Tobago.

In 2019, Roffey launched a crowdfunder campaign to fund a publicity campaign for the novel. The novel was first published on 2 April 2020 by Peepal Tree Press. The rights were later acquired by Vintage Publishing.

== Reception ==
The Mermaid of Black Conch won the 2020 Costa Book of the Year award. The novel was shortlisted for the 2020 Goldsmiths Prize, and longlisted for the 2021 Orwell Prize for Political Fiction.

The novel featured on the BBC Radio 4 programme A Book at Bedtime in August 2021.

Cambridge International added the novel to its major update of texts that can be studied for AS- and A-level literature in English from 2029.
