= When Will There Be Good News? =

2008 novel by Kate Atkinson

- First edition
- Author: Kate Atkinson
- Language: English
- Series: Jackson Brodie
- Genre: Crime Fiction
- Publisher: Doubleday
- Publication date: Aug 2008
- Publication place: United Kingdom
- Media type: Print, audio & ebook
- Pages: 352
- Awards: Richard & Judy Best Read of the Year
- ISBN: 0-385-60801-2
- Preceded by: One Good Turn
- Followed by: Started Early, Took My Dog

When Will There Be Good News? is a 2008 crime novel by Kate Atkinson and won the 2009 Richard & Judy Best Read of the Year at the British Book Awards. It is the third to involve retired private detective Jackson Brodie and is set in and around Edinburgh. It begins in Devon where six-year-old Joanna witnesses the brutal murder of her mother, sister and brother and barely escapes with her own life.

== Plot ==
In her crime novel When Will There Be Good News?, featuring recurring character Jackson Brodie, Kate Atkinson begins with several seemingly unrelated storylines that slowly resolve into a whole.

The story opens thirty years in the past. Six-year-old Joanna Mason lives in a remote house with her mother and two siblings after her father has abandoned them. Her mother is determined to survive and to do well by her kids. A man arrives and murders her mother, brother, and sister, but Joanna escapes, running off into the fields around the house.

In the present day, a mysterious man is following a young boy at a playground in order to collect a strand of his hair. The action shifts to Reggie, a teen girl babysitting for Joanna Hunter, the young survivor of the murders, now thirty-six, married, and with a young baby. Reggie is a smart but troubled girl, resentful of being on scholarship at her tiny school and recently orphaned. She views Joanna as an ideal mother, devoted to her baby; she enjoys babysitting as it gives her a taste of the family bonds she wishes she had. Reggie’s brother is slipping into a life of crime, which worries her. Joanna receives a visit from a police detective about her husband, which leaves her worried.

The mysterious man wishes to use the boy’s hair for a DNA test to prove he is the boy’s father. Louise, the police detective who visited Joanna, worries over her own teenage son while her new husband pressures her to have another baby. She views Joanna’s life as ideal, as well. Louise struggles with the fact that she’s investigating Joanna’s husband for potential insurance fraud. She discovers that the man who murdered Joanna’s family, Andrew Decker, has been released from prison.

The man seeking his son’s DNA is Jackson Brodie, a retired private detective. He boards the wrong train and finds himself heading to Edinburgh by accident; the train crashes, and he comes back to consciousness while being given CPR by Reggie. At dinner with her in-laws, Louise reflects on her past relationship with Jackson. Jackson finds he has another man’s wallet in his possession after the chaos of the crash—Andrew Decker.

Reggie discovers that Joanna and her baby have disappeared; Joanna’s husband tells Reggie that she has gone to visit an ailing aunt, but Reggie does not believe him. Reggie witnessed two men threatening Joanna. After struggling with a brief amnesia that led him to think he might be Andrew Decker, Jackson recovers from his injuries. Two men who might be connected to her brother assault Reggie in her house. When Reggie takes her fears about Joanna to Louise, asking for police intervention, Louise sees the bruises and is suspicious. Louise discovers that Jackson was on the train and goes to visit him; he reveals he is still very much in love with her.

Reggie has grown to like Jackson, finding in him a similar world-view and childhood experience. When Louise refuses to get the police involved based on her vague worry, she asks Jackson to look for Joanna. Jackson reluctantly agrees. They go to Joanna’s house and seeing the two men Reggie saw threatening her, follow them. They come to a house just as Joanna emerges with her baby, covered in blood. Joanna was, in fact, kidnapped by men her husband owes money to. She escapes her captors by violently stabbing them with a pen and a knife; when Jackson arrives on the scene she asks him to burn down the house, which he does so she will not be charged with murder.

Jackson discovers that Andrew Decker ended up with all of his possessions just as he has Decker’s. Decker is a tormented man; he goes to Jackson’s apartment and kills himself.

Joanna tells the police she cannot remember any details about her kidnapping; she discovers that her husband has been conning her, cleaning out their bank accounts; however the house is in her name, so she still has that.

The story leaps forward a few months into the future. Joanna’s husband has been arrested. Reggie has inherited money and moves in with her to help her cope with the fallout from her husband’s crimes and the divorce as well as to take care of the baby. Jackson reveals that thirty years before, he was the man who found Joanna hiding in the fields and saved her.

Hearing about Decker’s suicide, Jackson discovers that Joanna had visited Decker in prison a month before his release. He wonders if Joanna persuaded him to kill himself, and if it matters considering what the man did to her.

== Main characters ==
The main narrative is set thirty years later in Edinburgh and is told from the viewpoint of predominantly three main characters:

- Jackson Brodie is ostensibly returning to his flat in London but inadvertently boards the wrong train and heads north towards Edinburgh but the train crashes at Musselburgh and Jackson finds himself fighting for his life.
- Louise Munroe a Detective Chief Inspector has warned Joanna Hunter, now a doctor that the murderer convicted of killing her family is shortly to be released from prison and that the press may also try and contact her as a result. Louise is also supervising an investigation into Joanna's husband Neil who is suspected of insurance fraud.
- Regina 'Reggie' Chase is a sixteen-year-old orphan who baby-sits for Joanna, when Joanna disappears; her husband says that she has gone to visit an elderly aunt who is seriously ill, but Reggie does not believe him and tries to get Louise to take it seriously.

== Reception ==
Reviews were generally positive:

- Rebecca Armstrong writing in The Independent, concludes with 'Through the skilfully explored inner worlds of her characters, Atkinson examines how the past can affect the future, and how the choices we make have long-lasting implications. She handles cataclysmic events – a fatal train crash, abduction, possible suicide – with a light touch. The fast pace, while exhilarating, is never exhausting. As in the best crime fiction, dramatic events and unexpected twists abound, but Atkinson subverts the genre by refusing to neatly tie up every thread. And while there is plenty of blood and bitterness, redemption and resolve are well represented too. Good news all round.'
- Although Elissa Schappell writing in The New York Times writes “While Atkinson engages us with black humor and rich character development and while Reggie Chase is a delight, the absence of sustained suspense begins to fray our connection to the characters. Sensing perhaps that she’s lollygagging, Atkinson sprints for the last 75 pages, delivering a rushed, overly neat ending that, while cleanly tying up the big threads, leaves many questions about the characters and their futures unanswered.”

== Television adaptation ==
The novel was adapted for television for the BBC in 2011 as the final two episodes of the first series of Case Histories.

=== Cast ===
- Jason Isaacs as Jackson Brodie
- Amanda Abbington as Louise Monroe
- Gwyneth Keyworth as Reggie
- Neve McIntosh as Dr Joanna Hunter
