= Started Early, Took My Dog =

2010 novel by Kate Atkinson

- First edition
- Author: Kate Atkinson
- Cover artist: Photo of Fountains Abbey by Tracey Paterson
- Language: English
- Series: Jackson Brodie
- Genre: Crime fiction
- Publisher: Doubleday
- Publication date: 19 Aug 2010
- Publication place: United Kingdom
- Media type: Print (paperback and hardback)
- Pages: 352
- ISBN: 0-385-60802-0 (h/b); ISBN 0-385-61699-6 (p/b)
- OCLC: 718098042
- Preceded by: When Will There Be Good News? (2008)

Started Early, Took My Dog is a 2010 novel by English writer Kate Atkinson named after the Emily Dickinson poem of the same name.

It was adapted into an episode of the second season of the British television series Case Histories in 2013.

== Plot ==
The main story takes place over a few days in present-day (2010) Leeds, England and vicinity. There are frequent flashbacks to 1975, when the mystery being investigated originated.

== Main characters ==
- Tracy Waterhouse is now security chief at the Merrion Centre in Leeds but back in 1974 as a WPC just off probation she was one of the first on scene when the body of a murdered prostitute is found in a flat in Lovell Park, also in the flat is her 4-year-old son. Back in the present she sees another young child being dragged through the shopping centre by her abusive prostitute mother and decides to intervene.
- Jackson Brodie now a private investigator is trying to trace the birth parents of a woman now living in New Zealand who was adopted as a young child. His investigations lead him to Leeds.
- Matilda "Tilly" Squires is an elderly actress battling the onset of dementia who also witnesses the child being dragged through the shopping centre.

== Reception ==
- Janet Maslin in The New York Times commented: "The tone of the novel might be mild and nattering if Ms Atkinson were not so handy with the chill-worthy frisson. Jackson keeps summoning the phrase "For want of a nail ...” to convey the kinds of fateful repercussions that each bit of the story has...And Ms Atkinson writes passages that simply have to be read twice, once when you first travel through the book and then later, when you want to see just how she tricked you" and she concludes "Ms Atkinson remains a wonderful stylist and Grade A schemer, even with a book that’s overcluttered. But she was never confined to the crime genre, has written in assorted other modes and excels at them all. Whatever she goes on to write, she leaves Jackson Brodie at a suspenseful and pivotal moment. Future installments are well worth waiting for."
- Justine Jordan in The Guardian also praised the novel: "So much of the narrative is retrospective or interior that there's not much urgency to unfolding events, however highly coloured. And there's a rhetorical whimsy reminiscent of some of Atkinson's earlier books, a devil-may-care gesturing at the novel's own fictionality, which can leave the characters threatening to float free of our trust in them. But we follow their digressive, meandering voices avidly as they circle around their own particular loves and losses, all knitted together with Atkinson's extraordinary combination of wit, plain-speaking, tenderness and control".
- In contrast, David Robson in The Daily Telegraph wrote "There is such an elegant symmetry to the narrative that it is disappointing to report that the novel as a whole never catches fire. The flashbacks to 1975 should contextualise what is happening today, but Atkinson, like many a novelist before her, gets bogged down in tedious explanation. There is too much plotting, not enough of the kind of close human observation at which she excels...On the blurb, Atkinson’s publishers, fatuously, describe her as "one of the great writers of our time". If she wants to earn that tag, she needs to raise her game".
