= A God in Ruins (Atkinson novel) =

2015 novel by Kate Atkinson

- First edition (UK)
- Author: Kate Atkinson
- Cover artist: Jean-Baptiste Oudry
- Language: English
- Genre: Historical fiction
- Published: Doubleday (UK); Little, Brown (US)
- Media type: Print (hardcover, paperback)
- Pages: 468 (1st edition)
- ISBN: 0385618700
- OCLC: 903052583
- LC Class: PR6051.T56 G64 2015
- Preceded by: Life After Life (novel)

A God in Ruins is Kate Atkinson's ninth novel, published in 2015. The main character, Teddy Todd, is the younger brother of Ursula Todd, the protagonist in Atkinson's 2013 novel, Life After Life. Atkinson calls it the "companion piece" rather than a sequel to the earlier novel. The first book spans half a century, including World War II; the second is set entirely within it. It won the Costa Book Award for Novel in 2015.

== Plot ==
The novel is about the life of Teddy Todd (younger brother of Ursula Todd, the protagonist of the companion work, Life After Life). Events in his life are not revealed in chronological order. The book opens with a brief glimpse of him as a Royal Air Force (RAF) Halifax bomber pilot in World War II, then goes on to events in his childhood and the lives of his child and grandchildren, at times juxtaposing his memories with events in the lives of his family members. Teddy's memories of his own childhood in Fox Corner, the Todd family's country home, seemed all summers filled with bunnies and skylarks and bluebells, glimmering hot air and long gossamer evenings. The one difficulty in Teddy's young life was that when his Aunt Izzie came to visit she probed him with questions in order to supply her with details for the series of popular children's books she wrote about a boy named Augustus, set in a thinly disguised version of Teddy's idyllic home.(p. 3-9) - which the child himself greatly disliked.

As an RAF bomber pilot Teddy knew the odds, so early on he had prepared himself for death. Yet, improbably, flight after flight he returned. "Teddy realized that they were not so much warriors as sacrifices for the greater good. Birds thrown against a wall in the hope that eventually, if there were enough birds, they would break that wall." (p. 229) Completing one tour of duty, he would sign up for another. Hoping to share his luck, men vied for a place on his crew.

After the war, Teddy married Nancy, the woman who had been his childhood sweetheart, and they had a child, Viola. Nancy died of brain cancer when Viola was still young. Although Nancy had intended to end her life while she was still able, she did not. Instead, she insisted Teddy help her to die in a dramatic scene that Viola never told Teddy she had witnessed. Dutiful father, he gave up his poetry and rambling nature walks, moved into a suburban cottage, taught school and raised his only child, who never recovered from the loss of her mother, and always hated him. Years later, he had looked after Viola's children, too, and had a granddaughter who loved him, a consolation even after Viola packed him off to sheltered housing in his old age.

At the end of the book, and the end of Teddy's long life, when he had become too frail to do anything but remember, he recalled the flight that ended his RAF career. He remembered handing his parachute to the bomb-aimer and urging him to jump, and he himself went down with the plane, as he had always expected he would. Briefly, Atkinson then tied up loose ends: three members of Ted's crew parachuted successfully, survived in a German POW camp and returned to England after the war; but there was no Viola, no grandchildren; Ursula grieved, as did Nancy; on V.E. Day, Teddy's mother overdosed on sleeping pills.

== Major themes ==
=== Fiction ===
The last line of the novel is: "And when all else is gone Art remains. Even Augustus." (p. 445) Following this is a tale from the Adventures of Augustus, "The Awful Consequences", (written by Teddy's Aunt Izzie). The story goes on for several pages before it is interrupted:

"Oh, do stop," Teddy said to Ursula.

"He's nothing like you, you know," his sister said, laughing.

"I know that," Teddy said. "But please stop reading now."

In midlife, Viola developed a successful career as a popular novelist (although it is noted that not even success made her happy). Having tuned out her father and everything he said for decades ... "She wished she had asked him about his war when he was still compos mentis. She might have been able to use his memories as the basis of a novel. One that everyone would respect. People always took war novels seriously."(p. 370) In her review of the novel, Maureen Corrigan observed that 2015 was the 70th anniversary of V.E. Day and said, "Kate Atkinson's magnificent new novel, "A God In Ruins," both mourns the passing of the World War II generation and offers the consolation of fiction as a way to vicariously enter into the experience of the war."

Following the text of the novel, in an "Author's Note," Atkinson stated, "The bottom line is that it's fiction. Personally, I think all novels are not only fiction they are about fiction too." (p. 457) "And, of course," she added, "there is a great conceit hidden at the heart of the book to do with fiction and the imagination, which is revealed only at the end but which is in a way the whole raison d'etre of the novel."(p. 458) Stephanie Merritt commented in The Guardian review, "At first glance A God in Ruins appears to be a more straightforward novel than Life After Life, though it shares the same composition, flitting back and forth in time ... allowing Atkinson to reveal her characters in glimpses over the course of the novel while withholding vital information that creates mysteries at the heart of the story." Ultimately, in what critic James Walton called, "one of the most devastating twists in recent fiction," the novel ends with Teddy dying in the war, reversing events and erasing characters.

== Explanation of the novel's title ==
The book begins with three epigraphs, the first of which refers to the title: "A man is a god in ruins. When men are innocent, life shall be longer, and shall pass into the immortal, as gently as we awake from dreams."—Ralph Waldo Emerson, Nature

== Reception ==
The novel was widely praised in reviews, described as: "fiction at its best," "a dazzling read," "bold, playful and engrossing," "tender, moving, caustic, and at times, brilliantly funny," and "a grown-up, elegant fairy tale, at least of a kind, with a humane vision of people in all their complicated splendor." Book critic Maureen Corrigan said, "In "A God In Ruins," Atkinson has written a novel that takes its place in the line of powerful works about young men and war, stretching from Stephen Crane's "Red Badge Of Courage" to Kevin Powers' "The Yellow Birds" and Ben Fountain's "Billy Lynn's Halftime Walk."

The only notable negatives were in contrasting A God in Ruins with Life After Life. In the Los Angeles Times, reviewer Carolyn Kellogg said, "sadly, the new book doesn't live up to the promise of its predecessor," citing the effects of unappealing characters, the disappointments of post-war Britain and Teddy's losses in old age. In Time, Lev Grossman closed the review with his only reservation: "while A God in Ruins is as finely crafted as Life After Life, which is saying a lot–everything–it's not as much fun."

Barbara Wheatley noted that "A careful look would show the overall plots of Life After Life and A God in Ruins as precise mirror images of each other.(...) Life After Life is overshadowed by Teddy's death in aerial battle over Germany. Deeply grieving for her lost lover, Nancy tells Teddy's sister Ursula: "He would never get married and have children, never live the wonderful life he deserved". But at the very end of the book, Teddy miraculously comes back from the dead. Ursula compares herself and Nancy, come to meet him, with the Marys meeting the resurrected Jesus. Yet, as depicted in A God in Ruins, the life of the risen Teddy turned out to be far from satisfactory. His marriage was cut tragically short by Nancy's brain tumor, his fatherhood fatally blighted by the unrelenting hatred of his only child Viola, and his old age marked by humiliating degeneration and degradation at an inhuman "nursing home". Given at the last moment a chance to go back and change the way his life had gone, Teddy chooses to die as a young, self-sacrificing war hero - a bit reminiscent of the choice made by Achilles in Greek mythology. And thus, this book ends with Nancy and Ursula once again deeply grieving for the dead Teddy. Nancy cannot ever know that, in renouncing his post-war life, Teddy had also created a future in which she would be saved from the brain tumor – though it would be at the side of another man."
