= Life After Life (novel) =

Novel by Kate Atkinson

- First U.S. edition, 2013
- Author: Kate Atkinson
- Language: English
- Genre: Historical fiction
- Published: 2013 UK: Penguin Books. USA: (Reagan Arthur Books/Little, Brown and Company)
- Publication place: United Kingdom
- Media type: Print (hardcover, paperback)
- Pages: 529 (1st edition, hardcover)
- ISBN: 9780316176484
- OCLC: 806015209
- Followed by: A God in Ruins

Life After Life is a 2013 novel by Kate Atkinson. It is the first of two novels about the Todd family. The second, A God in Ruins, was published in 2015. Life After Life garnered acclaim from critics.

== Plot ==
The novel has an unusual structure, repeatedly looping back in time to describe alternative possible lives for its central character, Ursula Todd, who is born on 11 February 1910 to an upper-middle-class family near Chalfont St Peter in Buckinghamshire. In the first version, she is strangled by her umbilical cord and stillborn. In later iterations of her life she dies as a child - drowning in the sea, or when saved from that, by falling to her death from a window when trying to retrieve a fallen doll. Then there are several sequences when she falls victim to the Spanish flu epidemic of 1918 – which repeats itself again and again, though she already has a foreknowledge of it, and only her fourth attempt to avoid catching the flu succeeds.

Then there is an unhappy life where she is traumatised by being raped, getting pregnant and undergoing an illegal abortion, and finally becoming trapped in a highly oppressive marriage, and being killed by her abusive husband when trying to escape. In later lives she averts all this by being pre-emptively aggressive to the would-be rapist. In between, she also uses her half-memory of earlier lives to avert the young neighbour Nancy being raped and murdered by a child molester. The saved Nancy would play an important role in Ursula's later life(s), forming a deep love relationship with Ursula's brother Teddy, and would become a main character in the sequel, A God in Ruins.

Still later iterations of Ursula's life take her into World War II, where she works in London for the War Office and repeatedly witnesses the results of the Blitz, including a direct hit on a bomb shelter in Argyll Road in November 1940 - with herself being among the victims in some lives and among the rescuers in others. There is also a life in which she marries a German in 1934, is unable to return to England and experiences the war in Berlin under the allied bombings.

Ursula eventually comes to realize a sense of purpose, through a particularly strong sense of deja vu, from her previous lives, and decides to try to prevent the war by killing Adolf Hitler in late 1930. Memory of her earlier lives also provides the means of doing that: the knowledge that by befriending Eva Braun - in 1930 an obscure shop girl in Munich - Ursula would be able to get close to Hitler with a loaded gun in her bag; the inevitable price, however, is to be herself shot dead by Hitler's Nazi followers immediately after killing him.

What is left unclear - since each of the time sequences end with "darkness" and Ursula's death and does not show what followed - is whether in fact all these lives actually occurred in an objective world, or were only subjectively experienced by her. Specifically it is not clear whether or not her killing Hitler in 1930 actually produced an altered timeline where the Nazis did not take power in Germany, or possibly took power under a different leader with a different course of the Second World War. Although in her 1967 incarnation Ursula speculates with her nephew on this "might have been", the book avoids giving a clear answer.

== Critical reaction ==
Alex Clark of The Guardian gave Life After Life a positive review, saying that domestic details of daily life are conveyed beautifully, and that traumatic shifts in British society are also captured well "precisely because she cuts directly from one war to the next, only later going back to fill in, partially, what happened in between." Clark argued that the novel "[co-opts] the family [...] and [uses] it to show how fiction works and what it might mean to us [...] with an emotional delicacy and understanding that transcend experiment or playfulness. Life After Life gives us a heroine whose fictional underpinning is permanently exposed, whose artificial status is never in doubt; and yet one who feels painfully, horribly real to us." The Daily Telegraph's Helen Brown likewise praised it, calling it Atkinson's best book to date. The Independent found the central character to be sympathetic, and argued that the book's central message was that World War II was preventable and should not have been allowed to happen.

Janet Maslin of The New York Times Book Review praised Life After Life as Atkinson's "very best" book and "full of mind games, but they are purposeful rather than emptily playful. [...] this one connects its loose ends with facile but welcome clarity." She described it as having an "engaging cast of characters" and called the depiction of the British experience of World War II "gutsy and deeply disturbing, just as the author intends it to be." Francine Prose of The New York Times wrote that Atkinson "nimbly succeeds in keeping the novel from becoming confusing" and argued that the work "makes the reader acutely conscious of an author’s power: how much the novelist can do."

The Wall Street Journal's Sam Sacks dubbed Life After Life a "formidable bid" for the Man Booker Prize (though the novel was ultimately not longlisted). He said the high-concept premise of "Ursula [contriving] to avoid the accident that previously killed her [...] blends uneasily with what is otherwise a deft and convincing portrayal of an English family's evolution across two world wars [...] all the other characters seem complexly armed with free will." He found the resolution related to the prologue as "rushed and anti-climactic". But Sacks also said that "she [brings] characters to life with enviable ease", referring to the erosion of Sylvie and Hugh's marriage as "poignantly charted". Also, like Maslin, he lauded the novella-length Blitz chapter as "gorgeous and nerve-racking".

In NPR, novelist Meg Wolitzer suggested that the book proves that "a fully-realised world" is more important to the success of a fiction work than the progression of its story, and dubbed it a "major, serious yet playfully experimental novel". She argued that by not choosing one path for Ursula, Atkinson "opened her novel outward, letting it breathe unrestricted".

The Guardian's Sam Jordison expressed mixed feelings. He commended the depiction of Ursula and her family, and Atkinson's "fine storytelling and sharp eye for domestic detail". He argued, "There is real playfulness in these revisited moments and repetition never breeds dullness. Instead, we try to spot the differences and look for refractions of the same scene, considering the permutations of what is said and done. It can provide an enjoyable and interactive experience." He criticised the portions outside Britain, however, and said overall that the book has "an abundance of human warmth, but it just isn't convincing. There is much to enjoy – but not quite enough to admire."

In 2019, Life After Life was ranked by The Guardian as the 20th best book since 2000. It was written that the "dizzying fictional construction is grounded by such emotional intelligence that her heroine’s struggles always feel painfully, joyously real." The novel was 20th in Paste's list of the 40 best novels of the 2010s, with Alexis Gunderson arguing, "No one gets to live as many lives and have as many second chances to get the next step right as protagonist Ursula Todd. But in a decade where the real world swung between wars and elections, there are few more clarifying literary escapes than Life After Life. [...] Atkinson’s sage weaves a heartbreaking, frightening and beautiful journey that’s written with tenacity and grace."

It was listed as one of the decade's top 10 fiction works by Time, where it was billed as "a defining account of wartime London, as Ursula experiences the devastation of the Blitz from various perspectives, highlighting the senselessness of bombing raids. The story of her multiple lives is both moving and lighthearted, filled with comic asides and evocative language about life’s many joys and sorrows." Entertainment Weekly ranked it second, with David Canfield arguing that Life After Life "seamlessly executes an idiosyncratic premise [...] and contains a seemingly endless capacity to surprise", but that it "will stand the test of time for its in-between moments — its portraits of wartime, its glimpses into small domestic worlds, its understanding of one woman’s life as filled with infinite possibilities." The novel was among the honourable mentions on the Literary Hub list of the 20 best novels of the decade.

== Awards and honours ==
- 2013 Costa Book Award (Novel)
- Shortlisted, 2013 Baileys Women's Prize for Fiction
- Waterstones Book of the Year (2013)
- Walter Scott Prize (2014)
- One of the 10 Best Books of 2013, The New York Times Book Review
- Listed, ALA Notable Books for Adults (2014)
- Zombie Selection and Finalist, The Morning News Tournament of Books (2014)
- Goodreads Choice Awards (Historical Fiction 2013)
- Longlisted, Andrew Carnegie Medal (2014)
- The South Bank Show Annual Award for Literature (2014)
- Ranked 51st in the New York Times list of the 100 best books of the 21st century (2024)

== Adaptation ==
The BBC commissioned a four-part adaptation of Atkinson's work in December 2020. In April 2021, it was announced that Thomasin McKenzie and Sian Clifford would star in the series alongside James McArdle, Jessica Brown Findlay, and Jessica Hynes with Patsy Ferran, Harry Michell, Laurie Kynaston, Joshua Hill, and Maria Laird completing the cast. The series began broadcast on 19 April 2022.

== See also ==
- The First Fifteen Lives of Harry August
- Groundhog Day (film) - film with a similar theme
- Sliding Doors
- Russian Doll (TV series)
- Replay (Grimwood novel)

https://www.shmoop.com/study-guides/life-after-life/ursula-todd-timeline.html
