= Case Histories (TV series) =

British crime drama television series

- DVD cover
- Genre: Drama
- Directed by: Marc Jobst; Dan Zeff
- Starring: Jason Isaacs; Amanda Abbington; Paul McCole; Kirsty Mitchell; Zawe Ashton; Millie Innes
- Composer: John Keane
- Original language: English
- No. of series: 2
- No. of episodes: 6

Production
- Executive producer: Nicole Finnan
- Producer: Helen Gregory
- Production locations: Edinburgh, Scotland, UK
- Editor: William Webb
- Running time: 60 minutes (series 1); 90 minutes (series 2)
- Production company: Ruby Films

Original release
- Network: BBC One; BBC Scotland
- Release: 5 June 2011 – 2 June 2013

Case Histories is a British crime drama television series based on the Jackson Brodie novel series by Kate Atkinson. It stars Jason Isaacs, who has also narrated the abridged audiobook adaptation, as protagonist Jackson Brodie. The series is set and filmed in Edinburgh. Initially, each episode was aired in two 60-minute sections. The first series premiered on June 5, 2011, on BBC One in the United Kingdom, and in October 2011 on PBS in the United States. A second series aired in 2013. Initially commissioned as two feature-length episodes, in September 2012, the BBC reported that the format of series two would be different, encompassing three self-contained stories, at a running time of ninety minutes per episode. The first episode was revealed to be an adaptation of Atkinson's 2010 novel, Started Early, Took My Dog. Filming for the second series commenced in October 2012. The second and third episodes of the series are original stories, written exclusively for television.

== Plot ==
Private investigator Jackson Brodie (Jason Isaacs) is a former soldier and policeman. He has a habit of taking on too many cases at the same time, not all of them with paying customers. He is also plagued by the unsolved murder of his sister. He is sometimes assisted by his former colleague, Louise Munroe (Amanda Abbington).

== Cast ==
- Jason Isaacs as Jackson Brodie
- Amanda Abbington as DI Louise Munroe
- Zawe Ashton as Deborah Arnold
- Millie Innes as Marlee Brodie
- Natasha Little as Julia Land
- Kirsty Mitchell as Josie Brodie
- Edward Corrie as Marcus Stewart
- Martin Stevenson as Archie Munroe
- Rory Barraclough as Young Jackson Brodie
- Allan Linsday as Francis Brodie
- Paterson Joseph as Patrick Carter
- Tessa Titterington as Young Amelia
- Morven Christie as Michelle Moore
- Rose Leslie as Laura Wyre
- Phil Davis as Mr Wyre (father of Laura)
- Gwyneth Keyworth as Reggie Teague

== Episodes ==
=== Series 1 (2011) ===
No. overall	No. in season	Title	Directed by	Written by	Original release date	UK viewers (millions)
1	1	"Case Histories"	Marc Jobst	Ashley Pharoah	5 June 2011 (Part 1); 6 June 2011 (Part 2)	6.42 (Part 1); 5.56 (Part 2)
While searching for a lost cat, private investigator and former policeman Jackson Brodie takes on the cold case of a girl who went missing thirty years earlier. He is also talked into helping a grieving father find the man who murdered his daughter, and tracking down the niece of a mysterious seductress. In addition to his hunt for a killer and a long-vanished young girl, Brodie takes on another missing-persons case. This time the absent youth is the niece of a woman he met in a bar, who secured his services through an unorthodox method.
2	2	"One Good Turn"	Bill Anderson	Unknown	12 June 2011 (Part 1); 13 June 2011 (Part 2)	4.91 (Part 1); 4.88 (Part 2)
On an early morning run along the coast, Brodie spots a woman's body in the water but is unable to prevent it from floating out to sea. When the police appear less than enthusiastic about investigating, Brodie decides to do it himself. He has several questions to ponder: Why would a road rage attacker want to kill him and another bystander, a crime novelist, who witnessed the incident? What does the attacker have to do with a shady cleaning business? And how does it relate to the body Brodie saw in the sea? Brodie then uncovers the dark secrets of the novelist's holiday in Russia.
3	3	"When Will There Be Good News?"	Dan Zeff	Peter Harness	19 June 2011 (Part 1); 20 June 2011 (Part 2)	5.03 (Part 1); 5.00 (Part 2)
While investigating an apparently routine case of marital infidelity, Brodie is caught up in an accident and falls into another job—tracking down a mother, Joanna Hunter, and her baby who, the husband claims, are staying with a relative. Brodie picks up a lead from Reggie, a young nanny who knew the dead woman in the car accident, and wants him to locate her employer Dr. Joanna Hunter, who disappeared with her baby son. Brodie learns that the husband knows more than he has been willing to admit. He also discovers why one of his clients has been so desperate to find his wife.

=== Series 2 (2013) ===
No. overall	No. in season	Title	Directed by	Written by	Original release date	UK viewers (millions)
4	1	"Started Early, Took My Dog"	Kenny Glenaan	Peter Harness	19 May 2013	5.47
After being duped into taking part in a kidnapping in Germany, Jackson returns to Edinburgh feeling dejected, though he does acquire a dog. He is approached by Hope McMaster, an adoptee anxious to locate her birth mother, which leads Jackson to see retired cop Ray and his wife Maggie, who knew the adoptive parents. Soon afterward an anonymous caller warns him not to investigate Carol Braithwaite, who, Jackson learns, was a prostitute killed in 1979. He visits the case officer, Tracy Waterhouse, now a security guard who has illegally taken in Courtney, the silent child of another prostitute who was the latest victim of a serial killer. After corrupt ex-police chief Lomax threatens Jackson to back off, Tracy and her former colleague Barry explain that, after Carol's murder, Lomax appears to have spirited away her son, Michael. Jackson meets another private eye, engaged by Michael to learn what happened. Barry tells Jackson exactly what happened when Carol was murdered, leading Jackson to work out who killed her. To assuage his guilt over the kidnapping he gives his fee to Tracy to start a new life with Courtney.
5	2	"Nobody's Darling"	David Richards	Emily Ballou	26 May 2013	4.15
After Jackson's daughter Marlee returns to live with him, he is approached by Rachel Stewart, who is perturbed by her boyfriend Andy Marshall's frequent disappearances. Jackson follows Andy to a remote farm where he meets Miriam Baker. Miriam believes that the death of her estranged daughter, Isobel Marshall, a noted equestrian, was no accident and blames her then-son-in-law—Andy Marshall. Posing as a friend of Isobel, Jackson calls on Andy and is told by Rachel that he was having an affair with her whilst still married; and a colleague of Isobel reveals that Isobel was planning to take their son Freddie and leave Andy. Jackson discovers that Isobel was less than the golden girl suggested by her public image before working out how she died. His luck seems to be in when he wins a small fortune on a racehorse called Nobody's Darling, but the death of the bookmaker leads to the exposure of a scam and the winnings are frozen.
6	3	"Jackson and the Women"	Keith Boak	Debbie O'Malley	2 June 2013	4.32
Jackson arrives at his office to find Deborah has quit and young Aiden Kelso is waiting for him. Aiden's mother Isla was understood to have been the victim of serial killer Philip McCrory. Recently the dying McCrory had owned up to all the murders except Isla's, and Aiden wants the case reopened. Aiden's father Ian is evasive, painting a saintly picture of Isla when she was loose living and a drinker, to protect Aiden. Having been fleeced by his girlfriend Charlotte, who he learns is a professional con artist, Jackson bumps into old flame Julia, now heavily pregnant, who inadvertently gives him a lead which results in the arrest of Isla's killer. Jackson also tracks down recalcitrant Egyptian teenager Samira Minyawi on behalf of her controlling father, as Minyawi helped in the German kidnap. Having rescued Samira from her violent boyfriend, Jackson dates the recently divorced Louise Munroe, but feels he cannot commit to a relationship with her and goes home, eventually ending up delivering Julia's baby.

In the United States, series 2 was broadcast on 12, 19, and 26 October 2013.
