= Nabil =

Nabil, Nabeel, Nabiel, Nebil, or Nabyl (Arabic: نبيل) is a masculine given name and surname of Arabic origin. It means "noble" in Arabic. Notable people with the name include:

== Given name ==
=== Nabeel ===
- Nabeel (actor) (born 1968), Pakistani actor
- Nabeel Abbas (born 1986), Iraqi footballer
- Nabeel Abraham (born 1950), American anthropologist and activist
- Nabeel Shaukat Ali (born 1989), Pakistani singer
- Nabeel Gareeb, Pakistani-American businessman
- Nabeel bin Yaqub Al-Hamar (born 1950), Bahraini politician
- Nabeel Jabbour (born 1941), Syrian author, lecturer, and Islamic scholar
- Nabeel Kassis (born 1945), Palestinian academic and politician
- Nabeel Saleh Mubarak, Bahraini modern pentathlete
- Nabeel Qureshi (author) (1983–2017), American Christian apologist
- Nabeel Qureshi (director) (born 1985), Pakistani film director
- Nabeel Rajab (1964–2026), Bahraini human rights activist and opposition leader
- Nabeel Sabah (born 1990), Iraqi footballer
- Nabeel Yasin (born 1950), Iraqi poet, journalist, and political activist

=== Nabiel ===
- Nabiel Makarim (1945–2021), Indonesian politician

=== Nabil ===
- Nabil Aankour (born 1993), Moroccan footballer
- Nabil Aberdin (born 2002), Emirati footballer
- Nabil Abidallah (born 1982), Dutch-Moroccan footballer
- Nabil Abou-Harb (born 1984), American filmmaker, writer, and producer
- Nabil Adamou (born 1975), Algerian long jumper
- Nabil Adib, Sudanese human rights lawyer
- Nabil Ahmad (born 1983), Malaysian entertainer, comedian, and actor
- Nabíl-i-Akbar (1829–1892), Iranian Baháʼí apostle
- Nabil Ali (1938–2016), Egyptian scientist, writer, and thinker
- Nabil Alioui (born 1999), French footballer
- Nabil Abou Alqama (1977–2012), Algerian jihadist
- Nabil Ammar (born 1965), Tunisian diplomat and politician
- Nabil Al-Amoudi, Saudi politician
- Nabil Amr (born 1947), Palestinian politician
- Nabil Anani (born 1943), Palestinian artist
- Nabil Ashoor (born 1982), Omani footballer
- Nabil Aslam (born 1984), Pakistani-Danish footballer
- Nabil Al Awadi (born 1970), Kuwaiti writer and Islamic scholar
- Nabil Ayad, British international relations scholar
- Nabil Ayers, American musician and entrepreneur
- Nabil Ayouch (born 1969), French-Moroccan television and film director, producer, and writer
- Nabil Sabio Azadi (born 1991), Iranian-New Zealand artist
- Nabíl-i-A`zam (1831–1892), Iranian Baháʼí apostle, historian, and poet
- Nabil Baalbaki (born 1978), Lebanese footballer
- Nabil Baha (born 1981), Moroccan footballer
- Nabil Bahoui (born 1991), Swedish-Moroccan footballer
- Nabil El Basri (born 2004), Moroccan footballer
- Nabil Baz (born 1987), Algerian racing cyclist
- Nabil Bechaouch (1970–2020), Tunisian footballer
- Nabil Begg (born 2004), Fijian footballer
- Nabil Benabdallah (born 1959), Moroccan politician and minister
- Nabil Bentaleb (born 1994), Algerian footballer
- Nabil Bonduki (born 1955), Brazilian architect, urban planner, university professor, author, and politician
- Nabil Boukili (born 1984), Belgian politician
- Nabil Bousmaha (born 1990), Algerian footballer
- Nabil Bukhalid (1957–2023), Lebanese computer scientist
- Nabil Al Busaidi (born 1970), British adventurer
- Nabil Choueiri (born 1950), Lebanese long-distance runner
- Nabil Crismatt (born 1994), Colombian baseball player
- Nabil Dafi (born 1982), French footballer
- Nabil Daoudi (born 1983), Moroccan footballer
- Nabil Dibis, Egyptian businessman and politician
- Nabil Dirar (born 1986), Moroccan footballer
- Nabil Djalout (born 1989), French rugby league footballer
- Nabil Ech-Chaabi (born 2001), Moroccan karateka
- Nabil Ejenavi (born 1994), Algerian footballer
- Nabil Elaraby (1935–2024), Egyptian diplomat
- Nabil Elderkin (born 1982), Australian photographer and director
- Nabil Elouahabi (born 1975), British-Moroccan actor
- Nabil Emad (born 1996), Egyptian footballer
- Nabil Ennasri (born 1982), French writer, association actor, and geopolitical specialist
- Nabil Esmail (born 1942), Egyptian chemical engineer
- Nabil Al Fadl (1949–2015), Kuwaiti politician
- Nabil Fahmi (born 1951), Egyptian diplomat and politician
- Nabil Hasan al-Faqih (born 1968), Yemeni politician
- Nabil Farouk (1956–2020), Egyptian novelist
- Nabil Fayyad (1955–2022), Syrian intellectual and researcher
- Nabil Fekir (born 1993), French footballer
- Nabil Fiqri (born 1987), Malaysian field hockey player
- Nabil de Freige (born 1955), Lebanese politician
- Nabil Gabol (born 1963), Pakistani politician
- Nabil Al-Garbi (born 1993), Yemeni middle-distance runner
- Nabil Ghilas (born 1990), Algerian footballer
- Nabil Gholam (born 1962), Lebanese architect
- Nabil Guelsifi (born 1986), French footballer
- Nabil Haddad, Jordanian Melkite Greek Catholic priest
- Nabil Hakim (born 1999), Malaysian footballer
- Nabil Hamouda (born 1983), Algerian footballer
- Nabil Hegazi, Egyptian professor
- Nabil Hemani (1979–2014), Algerian footballer
- Nabil Husein (born 1994), Indonesian businessman
- Nabil Jaadi (born 1996), Belgian-Moroccan footballer
- Nabil Jeffri (born 1993), Malaysian racing driver
- Nabil Kanso (1940–2019), Lebanese-American painter
- Nabil Karoui (born 1963), Tunisian politician and businessman
- Nabil Kassel (born 1984), Algerian boxer
- Nabil Kebbab (born 1983), Algerian swimmer
- Nabil Khachab (born 2000), Moroccan-Dutch kickboxer
- Nabil Khalil (born 1962), Lebanese alpine skier
- Nabil el-khoury (born 1941), Lebanese philosopher
- Nabil Kochaji (born 1975), Syrian author and medical researcher
- Nabil Kouki (born 1970), Tunisian football coach
- Nabil Lamara (born 1993), Algerian footballer
- Nabil Lasmari (born 1978), Algerian badminton player
- Nabil Latpi (born 1992), Malaysian footballer
- Nabil M. Lawandy (born 1957), American physicist, inventor, academic, and businessman
- Nabil Maâloul (born 1962), Tunisian football player and coach
- Nabil Madi (born 1981), Algerian middle distance runner
- Nabil Makni (born 2001), French-Tunisian footballer
- Nabil Maleh (1936–2016), Syrian film director, screenwriter, producer, painter, and poet
- Nabil Marmouk (born 1998), Moroccan footballer
- Nabil Mazari (born 1984), Algerian footballer
- Nabil Medjahed, French football manager
- Nabil Miladi (born 1988), Tunisian volleyball player
- Nabil Miskinyar (born 1948), Afghan-American TV host
- Nabil Nacif (born 2009), Bolivian footballer
- Nabil Na'eem (born 1956), Egyptian Islamist and politician
- Nabil Nahas (born 1949), Lebanese-American artist and painter
- Nabil Nahri (born 1958), Syrian sprinter
- Nabil Naoum (born 1944), Egyptian writer and critic
- Nabil El-Nayal (born 1985), Syrian-British fashion designer
- Nabil Neghiz (born 1967), Algerian football manager
- Nabil Nosair (1938–2016), Egyptian footballer
- Nabil Omran (born 1981), Libyan futsal player
- Nabil Qaouk (1964–2024), Lebanese politician and cleric
- Nabil Rajo, Eritrean-Canadian actor
- Nabil Abdul Rashid (born 1985), English-Nigerian comedian
- Nabil Rouabhi (born 1966), Algerian handball player
- Nabil Abu Rudeineh (born 1946), Palestinian politician
- Nabil Saâdou (born 1990), Algerian footballer
- Nabil F. Saba, American oncologist
- Nabil Sahraoui (1966–2004), Algerian Islamist militant
- Nabil Salameh (born 1962), Palestinian-Lebanese musician and journalist
- Nabil Salhi (born 1971), Tunisian wrestler
- Nabil Samad (born 1986), Bangladeshi cricketer
- Nabil Sawalha (born 1941), Jordanian comedian
- Nabil Sayadi, Lebanese-Belgian accused Islamic terrorist
- Nabil Seidah (born 1949), Egyptian-Canadian scientist
- Nabil Shaath (born 1938), Palestinian politician and banker
- Nabil Shaban (1953–2025), Jordanian-British actor and writer
- Nabil Al Shahmeh (born 1974), Syrian footballer
- Nabil Shehata (born 1980), German-Egyptian conductor
- Nabil Shukri (1930–2019), Egyptian Army officer
- Nabil El-Sibai, Syrian footballer
- Nabil Suleiman (born 1945), Syrian writer and literary critic
- Nabil Swelim (1930–2015), Egyptian Egyptologist
- Nabil Abdul Tahlak (born 1957), Emirati shooter
- Nabil Taïder (born 1983), French-Tunisian footballer
- Nabil Talhouni, Jordanian diplomat
- Nabil Tan (born 1955), Filipino politician and lawyer
- Nabil Touaizi (born 2001), Spanish-Moroccan footballer
- Nabil Yaâlaoui (born 1987), Algerian footballer
- Nabil Ben Yadir (born 1979), Moroccan-Belgian actor, film director, and screenwriter
- Nabil Yarou (born 1993), Beninese footballer
- Nabil Zalagh (born 1993), French judoka
- Nabil El Zhar (born 1986), Moroccan footballer

=== Nabyl ===
- Nabyl Lahlou (1945–2026), Moroccan theater director, author, and actor

=== Nebil ===
- Nebil Caidi (born 1988), Italian footballer
- Nebil Çika (1893–1944), Albanian philosopher and translator
- Nebil Gahwagi (born 1989), Libyan-Hungarian footballer
- Nebil Ibrahim (born 2000), Swedish boxer
- Nebil Özgentürk (born 1959), Turkish writer, journalist, and film director

== Surname ==
=== Nabeel ===
- Nasser Nabeel (born 1990), Qatari footballer

=== Nabil ===
- Ahmed Nabil (fencer) (born 1986), Egyptian fencer
- Rahmatullah Nabil (born 1968), Afghan politician
- Shahrun Nabil (born 1986), Malaysian field hockey player
- Youssef Nabil (born 1972), Egyptian artist and photographer

== See also ==
- Nabeel's Song, book by Jo Tatchell published accounting life of Iraqi poet Nabeel Yasin and his extended family
- Nabil Bank, commercial bank in Nepal
