= Costa Book Award for Biography =

Annual literary award for debut novels

The Costa Book Award for Biography, formerly part of the Whitbread Book Awards (1971–2006), was an annual literary award for biographies, part of the Costa Book Awards. The award concluded in 2022.

== Recipients ==
Costa Books of the Year are distinguished wit a blue ribbon.

Year	Author	Title	Subject	Result	Ref.
1971	Michael Meyer	Henrik Ibsen	Henrik Ibsen (1828–1906), Norwegian playwright and theatre director	Winner	
1972	James Pope-Hennessy	Anthony Trollope	Anthony Trollope (1815–1882), English novelist of the Victorian period	Winner	
1973	John Wilson	CB: A Life of Sir Henry Campbell-Bannerman	Sir Henry Campbell-Bannerman(1836–1908), Prime Minister of the United Kingdom from 1905 to 1908	Winner	
1974	Andrew Boyle	Poor, Dear Brendan: The Quest for Brendan Bracken	Brendan Bracken (1901–1958), Irish-born businessman and British politician	Winner	
1975	Helen Corke	In Our Infancy	Helen Corke (1882–1978), English writer and schoolteacher	Winner	
1976	Winifred Gerin	Elizabeth Gaskell	Elizabeth Gaskell (1810–1865), English writer	Winner	
1977	Nigel Nicolson	Mary Curzon	Mary Curzon, Baroness Curzon of Kedleston(1870–1906), British noble, Vicereine of India	Winner	
1978	John Grigg	Lloyd George: The People's Champion	Lloyd George (1863–1945), Prime Minister of the United Kingdom from 1916 to 1922	Winner	
1979	Penelope Mortimer	About Time	Penelope Mortimer (1918–1999), Welsh-born English writer	Winner	
1980	David Newsome	On the Edge of Paradise: A. C. Benson, Diarist	A. C. Benson (1862–1925), English essayist and poet	Winner	
1981	Nigel Hamilton	Monty: The Making of a General	Field Marshal Bernard Law Montgomery KG, GCB, DSO, PC, DL (1887–1976), the first Viscount Montgomery of Alamein	Winner	
1982	Edward Crankshaw	Bismarck	Otto von Bismarck (1871–1890), also known as the Iron Chancellor, the first Chancellor of Germany	Winner	
1983	Victoria Glendinning	Vita	The Honorable Victoria Mary Sackville-West, Lady Nicolson, CH (1892–1962), English author and garden designer (1892–1962)	Winner	
1983	Kenneth Rose	King George V	King George V (1865–1936), King of the United Kingdom and the British Dominions and Emperor of India 1910–1936	Winner	
1984	Peter Ackroyd	T. S. Eliot	T. S. Eliot (1888–1965), US-born British poet	Winner	
1985	Ben Pimlott	Hugh Dalton	Hugh Dalton (1887–1962), British Labour politician	Winner	
1986	Richard Mabey	Gilbert White	Gilbert White (1720–1793), English naturalist, ecologist, and ornithologist; author of Natural History and Antiquities of Selborne	Winner	
1987	Christopher Nolan	Under the Eye of the Clock	Christopher Nolan (1965–2009), Irish poet and author	Winner	
1988	A. N. Wilson	Tolstoy	Leo Tolstoy (1828–1910), Russian writer, author of War and Peace and Anna Karenina	Winner	
1989	Richard Holmes	Coleridge: Early Visions	Samuel Taylor Coleridge (1772–1834), English poet, literary critic, philosopher, and theologian	Winner	
1990	Ann Thwaite	AA Milne–His Life	A. A. Milne (1882–1956), British author	Winner	
1991	John Richardson	A Life of Picasso	Pablo Picasso (1881–1973), 20th-century Spanish painter and sculptor	Winner	
1992	Victoria Glendinning	Trollope	Anthony Trollope (1815–1882), English novelist of the Victorian period	Winner	
1993	Andrew Motion	Philip Larkin: A Writer's Life	Philip Larkin (1922–1985), English writer, jazz critic and librarian	Winner	
1994	Brenda Maddox	D H Lawrence: The Married Man	D. H. Lawrence (1885–1930), English writer and poet	Winner	
1995	Roy Jenkins	Gladstone	William Gladstone (1809–1898), British Liberal prime minister	Winner	
1995	Paul Berry and Mark Bostridge	Vera Brittain–A Life	Vera Brittain (1893–1970), English nurse and writer		
1995	Gitta Sereny	Albert Speer: His Battle with Truth	Albert Speer (1905–1981), Architect and Minister of War Production in Nazi Germany		
1995	Geoffrey Wansell	Terence Rattigan	Terence Rattigan (1911–1977), British playwright and screenwriter		
1996	Diarmaid MacCulloch	Thomas Cranmer: A Life	Thomas Cranmer (1489–1556), 16th-century English Archbishop of Canterbury and Protestant reformer	Winner	
1996	Rosemary Ashton	George Eliot: A Life	George Eliot (1819–1880), English novelist, essayist, poet, journalist, and translator	Shortlist	
1996	Flora Fraser	The Unruly Queen: The Life of Queen Caroline	Caroline of Brunswick, (1768–1821), Queen of the United Kingdom and Hanover as the wife of King George IV	Shortlist	
1996	James Knowlson	Damned to Fame: The Life of Samuel Beckett	Samuel Beckett (1906–1989), Nobel-winning modernist Irish novelist, playwright, short story writer, translator and poet	Shortlist	
1997	Graham Robb	Victor Hugo	Victor Hugo (1802–1885), French novelist, poet, and dramatist	Winner	
1997	Jessica Douglas-Home	Violet: The Life and Loves of Violet Gordon Woodhouse	Violet Gordon-Woodhouse (1872–1948), British harpsichordist and clavichordist	Shortlist	
1997	Kate Summerscale	Queen of Whale Cay	Marion "Joe" Carstairs (1900–1993), Wealthy British power boat racer known for their speed, eccentric lifestyle, and gender nonconformity	Shortlist	
1997	Stella Tillyard	Citizen Lord	Lord Edward FitzGerald (1763–1798), Irish revolutionary	Shortlist	
1997	Jenny Uglow	Hogarth, A Life and a World	William Hogarth (1697–1764), English artist and social critic	Shortlist	
1998	Amanda Foreman	Georgiana, Duchess of Devonshire	Georgiana, Duchess of Devonshire (1757–1806), English socialite, political organiser, style icon, author, and activist	Winner	
1998	John Bayley	Iris, A memoir of Iris Murdoch	Iris Murdoch (1919–1999), Irish-born British writer and philosopher	Shortlist	
1998	Ian Kershaw	Hitler, Volume One Hubris 1889–1936	Adolf Hitler, Führer of Nazi Germany (1889–1945)	Shortlist	
1999	David Cairns	Berlioz Volume Two: Servitude and Greatness	Hector Berlioz (1803–1869), French music composer and conductor	Winner	
1999	Nicholas Shakespeare	Bruce Chatwin	Bruce Chatwin (1940–1989), English writer, novelist and journalist	Shortlist	
1999	Hilary Spurling	Matisse	Henri Matisse (1869–1954), 20th-century French artist	Shortlist	
2000	Lorna Sage	Bad Blood–A Memoir	Lorna Sage (1943–2001), English academic, literary critic and author	Winner	
2000	Claire Harman	Fanny Burney	Fanny Burney (1752–1840), English diarist, novelist and playwright; the first literary woman novelist	Shortlist	
2000	Tim Hilton	John Ruskin: The Later Years	John Ruskin (1819–1900), English writer and art critic	Shortlist	
2000	Ian Kershaw	Hitler: 1936–45 Nemesis	Adolf Hitler, Führer of Nazi Germany (1889–1945)	Shortlist	
2001	Diana Souhami	Selkirk's Island	Alexander Selkirk (1676–1721), Scottish sailor and castaway	Winner	
2001	Anthony Bailey	Vermeer: A View of Delft	Johannes Vermeer (1632–1675), Dutch painter	Shortlist	
2001	Adam Sisman	Boswell's Presumptuous Task: The Making of the Life of Dr. Johnson	James Boswell, 9th Laird of Auchinleck (1740–1795), author of The Life of Samuel Johnson, which is discussed in Sisman's biography	Shortlist	
2001	Geoffrey Wall	Flaubert: A Life	Gustave Flaubert 1821–1880), French novelist	Shortlist	
2002	Claire Tomalin	Samuel Pepys: The Unequalled Self	Samuel Pepys (1633–1703), English diarist	Winner	
2002	Miranda Carter	Anthony Blunt: His Lives	Anthony Blunt (1907–1983), British art historian, Soviet spy	Shortlist	
2002	Brenda Maddox	Rosalind Franklin: The Dark Lady of DNA	Rosalind Franklin (1920–1958), British chemist, biophysicist and X-ray crystallographer	Shortlist	
2002	Ysenda Maxtone Graham	The Real Mrs Miniver	Jan Struther (1901–1953), author of the book-turned-film Mrs. Miniver	Shortlist	
2003	DJ Taylor	Orwell: The Life	George Orwell (1903–1950), English author and journalist	Winner	
2003	John Campbell	Margaret Thatcher - Volume Two: The Iron Lady	Margaret Thatcher (1925–2013), Prime Minister of the United Kingdom from 1979 to 1990	Shortlist	
2003	Caroline Moorehead	Martha Gellhorn	Martha Gellhorn (1908–1998), American journalist	Shortlist	
2003	Andrew Wilson	Beautiful Shadow: A Life of Patricia Highsmith	Patricia Highsmith(1921–1995), American novelist and short story writer	Shortlist	
2004	John Guy	My Heart Is My Own: The Life of Mary Queen of Scots	Mary, Queen of Scots (1542–1587), Queen of Scotland from 1542 to 1567	Winner	
2004	David McKie	Jabez: The Rise and Fall of a Victorian Rogue	Jabez Spencer Balfour (1843–1916), businessman, philanthropist, politician, temperance campaigner and charmer	Shortlist	
2004	John Sutherland	Stephen Spender	Stephen Spender (1909–1995), English poet and man of letters	Shortlist	
2004	Jeremy Treglown	V.S. Pritchett: A Working Life	V.S. Pritchett (1900–1997), British writer and literary critic	Shortlist	
2005	Hilary Spurling	Matisse the Master	Henri Matisse (1869–1954), 20th-century French artist	Winner	
2005	Nigel Farndale	Haw-Haw: The Tragedy of William and Margaret Joyce	William and Margaret Joyce (1900s), American-born fascist politician and Nazi propaganda broadcaster	Shortlist	
2005	Richard Mabey	Nature Cure	Richard Mabey (born 1941), British writer and broadcaster	Shortlist	
2005	Alexander Masters	Stuart: A Life Backwards	Stuart Clive Shorter, prisoner and a career criminal	Shortlist	
2006	Brian Thompson	Keeping Mum	Brian Thompson	Winner	
2006	Maggie Fergusson	George Mackay Brown: The Life	George Mackay Brown (1921–1996), Scottish poet 1921–1996	Shortlist	
2006	John Stubbs	John Donne: The Reformed Soul	John Donne (1572–1631), English poet and cleric	Shortlist	
2006	Jo Tatchell	Nabeel's Song: A Family Story of Survival in Iraq	Nabeel Yasin(born 1950), Iraqi poet, journalist and political activist	Shortlist	
2007	Simon Sebag Montefiore	Young Stalin	Joseph Stalin (1878–1953), Leader of the Soviet Union from 1924 to 1953	Winner	
2007	Julie Kavanagh	Rudolf Nureyev	Rudolf Nureyev (1938–1993), Soviet-born ballet dancer and choreographer	Shortlist	
2007	Ben Macintyre	Agent Zigzag	Eddie Chapman (1914–1997), Double agent for Britain during World War 2	Shortlist	
2007	Michael Simkins	Fatty Batter	Michael Simkins	Shortlist	
2008	Diana Athill	Somewhere Towards the End	Diana Athill (1917–2019), British literary editor, novelist and memoirist	Winner	
2008	Judith Mackrell	Bloomsbury Ballerina	Lydia Lopokova (1892–1981), Russian ballet dancer	Shortlist	
2008	Sathnam Sanghera	If You Don't Know Me By Now: A Memoir of Love, Secrets and Lies in Wolverhampton	Sathnam Sanghera (born 1976), British journalist and author	Shortlist	
2008	Jackie Wullschlager	Chagall	Marc Chagall (1887–1985), Russian-French artist	Shortlist	
2009	Graham Farmelo	The Strangest Man: The Hidden Life of Paul Dirac, Quantum Genius	Paul Dirac (1902–1984), English theoretical physicist	Winner	
2009	William Fiennes	The Music Room	William Fiennes (born 1970), English author	Shortlist	
2009	Simon Gray	Coda	Simon Gray (1936–2008), English playwright and memoirist	Shortlist	
2009	Caroline Moorehead	Dancing to the Precipice	Henriette-Lucy, Marquise de La Tour du Pin Gouvernet (1770–1853), French aristocrat famous for her posthumously published memoirs, Journal d'une femme de 50 ans	Shortlist	
2010	Edmund de Waal	The Hare with Amber Eyes	Ephrussis family, 20th-century Ukrainian Jewish banking and oil dynasty	Winner	
2010	Sarah Bakewell	How to Live: A Life of Montaigne in One Question and Twenty Attempts at an Answer	Michel de Montaigne (1533–1592), one of the most significant philosophers of the French Renaissance	Shortlist	
2010	Michael Frayn	My Father's Fortune	Michael Frayn (born 1933), English playwright and novelist	Shortlist	
2011	Matthew Hollis	Now All Roads Lead to France: The Last Years of Edward Thomas	Edward Thomas (1878–1917), a seminal poet in the history of British literature known for his work exploring the notions of disconnection and unsettledness	Winner	
2011	Julia Blackburn	Thin Paths: Journeys In and Around an Italian Mountain Village	Julia Blackburn (born 1948), British author of both fiction and non-fiction	Shortlist	
2011	Patrick Cockburn and Henry Cockburn	Henry’s Demons: Living with Schizophrenia, A Father and Son’s Story		Shortlist	
2011	Claire Tomalin	Charles Dickens: A Life	Charles Dickens (1812–1870), English writer and social critic	Shortlist	
2012	Mary Talbot and Bryan Talbot	Dotter of Her Father's Eyes		Winner	
2012	Artemis Cooper	Patrick Leigh-Fermor: An Adventure	Sir Patrick Michael Leigh Fermor (1915–2011), British author and soldier		
2012	Selina Guinness	The Crocodile by the Door: The Story of a House, a Farm and a Family	Selina Guinness		
2012	Kate Hubbard	Serving Victoria: Life in the Royal Household			
2013	Lucy Hughes-Hallett	The Pike: Gabriele D'Annunzio, Poet, Seducer and Preacher of War	Gabriele D'Annunzio (1863–1938), Italian writer	Winner	
2013	Gavin Francis	Empire Antarctica: Ice, Silence & Emperor Penguins	Gavin Francis (born 1975) Scottish physician and a writer on travel and medical matters	Shortlist	
2013	Thomas Harding	Hanns and Rudolf: The German Jew and the Hunt for the Kommandant of Auschwitz	Hanns Alexander (1917–2006), German Jewish refugee who tracked down and arrested the Kommandant of Auschwitz Rudolf Höss	Shortlist	
2013	Olivia Laing	The Trip to Echo Spring: Why Writers Drink		Shortlist	
2014	Helen Macdonald	H is for Hawk		Winner	
2014	John Campbell	Roy Jenkins: a Well-Rounded Life	Roy Jenkins (1920–2003), British politician, historian and writer	Shortlist	
2014	Marion Coutts	The Iceberg: a Memoir	Tom Lubbock, the chief art critic for The Independent	Shortlist	
2014	Henry Marsh	Do No Harm: Stories of Life, Death and Brain Surgery		Shortlist	
2015	Andrea Wulf	The Invention of Nature	Alexander von Humboldt (1769–1859), Prussian geographer, naturalist and explorer	Winner	
2015	Robert Douglas-Fairhurst	The Story of Alice: Lewis Carroll and the Secret History of Wonderland	Lewis Carroll (1832–1898), British writer, Anglican deacon and photographer, author of Alice's Adventures in Wonderland	Shortlist	
2015	Thomas Harding	The House by the Lake		Shortlist	
2015	Ruth Scurr	John Aubrey: My Own Life	John Aubrey (1626–1697), English writer and antiquarian	Shortlist	
2016	Keggie Carew	Dadland: A Journey into Uncharted Territory		Winner	
2016	John Guy	Elizabeth: The Forgotten Years		Shortlist	
2016	Hisham Matar	The Return		Shortlist	
2016	Sylvia Patterson	I’m Not With the Band		Shortlist	
2017	Rebecca Stott	In the Days of Rain	Rebecca Stott (born 1964), British writer and broadcaster	Winner	
2017	Xiaolu Guo	Once Upon a Time in the East: A Story of Growing Up		Shortlist	
2017	Caroline Moorehead	A Bold and Dangerous Family: The Rossellis and the Fight Against Mussolini		Shortlist	
2017	Stephen Westaby	Fragile Lives: A Heart Surgeon’s Stories of Life and Death on the Operating Table		Shortlist	
2018	Bart van Es	The Cut Out Girl: A Story of War and Family, Lost and Found		Winner	
2019	Jack Fairweather	The Volunteer: The True Story of the Resistance Hero who Infiltrated Auschwitz	Witold Pilecki (1901–1948), Polish underground resistance soldier and World War II concentration camp resistance leader	Winner	
2019	Laura Cumming	On Chapel Sands: My Mother and Other Missing Persons		Shortlist	
2019	Adam Nicolson	The Making of Poetry	Samuel Taylor Coleridge, English poet, literary critic and philosopher (1772–1834), and William Wordsworth, English Romantic poet (1770–1850)	Shortlist	
2019	Lindsey Hilsum	In Extremis	Marie Colvin, American journalist who worked as a foreign affairs correspondent	Shortlist	
2020	Lee Lawrence	The Louder I Will Sing		Winner	
2021	John Preston	Fall: The Mystery of Robert Maxwell		Winner	
2021	Arifa Akbar	Consumed: A Sister’s Story		Shortlist	
2021	Ed Caesar	The Moth and the Mountain: A True Story of Love, War and Everest		Shortlist	
2021	Lea Ypi	Free: Coming of Age at the End of History		Shortlist	
