= Lea Ypi =

Albanian professor of political theory (born 1979)

Lea Ypi FBA
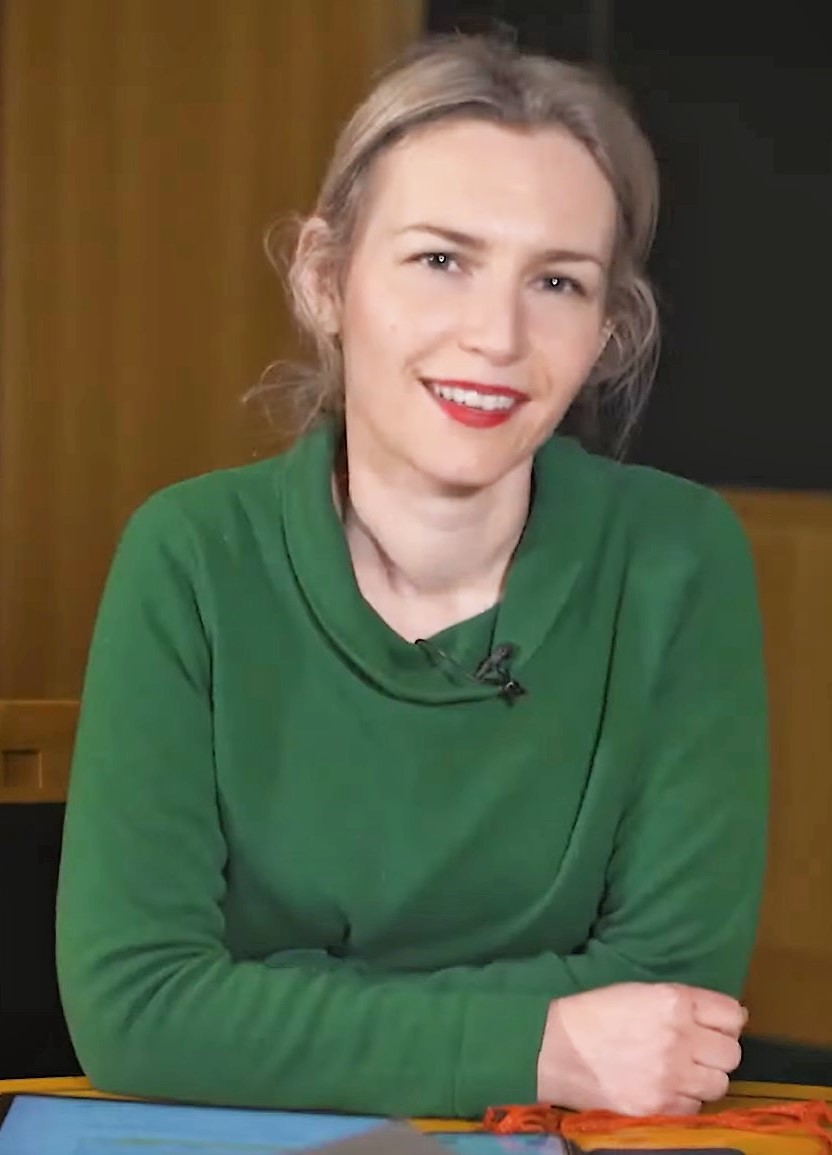
- Ypi in a video from the British Library in 2022
- Born: 8 September 1979 (age 47); Tirana, Albania

Academic background
- Education: Sapienza University of Rome (laurea); European University Institute (PhD)
- Thesis: Statist cosmopolitanism (2008)
- Doctoral advisors: Peter Wagner

Academic work
- Era: Contemporary philosophy
- Discipline: Western philosophy
- School or tradition: Continental philosophy Critical theory
- Institutions: London School of Economics; Nuffield College, Oxford
- Main interests: Political theory, Enlightenment, Marxism, Nationalism
- Website: leaypi.com

Lea Leman Ypi FBA (born 8 September 1979) is an Albanian academic and author. She is the Ralph Miliband Professor of Politics and Philosophy at the London School of Economics.

== Background and early life ==
Ypi was born in Tirana, Albania, the eldest child of Xhaferr Ypi and Vjollca Veli, who were relatively regular citizens under communist rule, but who later became involved in Albanian democratic politics in Ypi's late childhood prior to the 1997 Albanian civil unrest. She grew up in both communist and post-communist Albania, the experience of this transition being the main topic of her book Free: Coming of Age at the End of History (2021). Her historically Muslim family was compelled to be atheist under communist rule (Ypi says she is now agnostic). One of her paternal great-grandfathers, Xhafer Ypi, was briefly Prime Minister of Albania in the 1920s, and also very briefly headed the Albanian government at the beginning of the Italian occupation. His son, Ypi's grandfather, was imprisoned by Albania's communist government for 15 years.

== Education ==
Ypi earned a degree in philosophy at the Sapienza University of Rome in 2002 and a degree in literature from the same institution in 2004. She received her Master of Research from the European University Institute in 2005 and her PhD in political theory from the European University Institute in 2008, with a thesis on Statist cosmopolitanism under the supervision of Peter Wagner. Prior to joining the London School of Economics she was a post-doctoral prize research fellow at Nuffield College, Oxford.

== Works ==
Ypi's research interests are in normative political theory (including democratic theory, theories of justice, and issues of migration and territorial rights), Enlightenment political thought (especially Kant), Marxism and critical theory, as well as the intellectual history of the Balkans, especially her native Albania.

Her 2021 book Free: Coming of Age at the End of History was shortlisted for the Baillie Gifford Prize and the Costa Book Award for Biography. It won the Ondaatje Prize, the Slightly Foxed First Biography Prize, and was listed by The Sunday Times as one of their twelve "exceptional memoirs" published in the last 30 years. In 2022, BBC Radio 4 serialised the book in their Book of the Week series.

Ypi's 2025 book Indignity is another family history which explores the concept of dignity from the collapse of the Ottoman Empire, to the arrival of Communism in the Balkans, through the life of Ypi's grandmother. It was published by Penguin Press in the UK and Farrar, Straus and Giroux in the USA. It received reviews by The Observer, The Economist, The New York Times, The Washington Post, Frankfurter Allgemeine Zeitung and The Christian Science Monitor. It was a book of the year for the Sunday Times, The Washington Post and NPR, and became a bestseller in a number of European countries. In 2026, it was longlisted for the Women's Prize for Non-Fiction.

Her work appeared in Boston Review.

== Political involvement ==
In November 2026, as a participant in the 1st Paris Summit Against International Oligarchy, Ypi co-authored the Paris manifesto against international oligarchy. The document called for the building of a "democratic International" and proposed a series of measures to combat the global power of "extreme wealth": a wealth tax and unpaid tax recovery scheme aimed at the ultra-rich, strengthening public control over the mass media after the model of the French press ordinance of 26 August 1944, and democratising artificial intelligence by entrusting the technology to international nonprofit foundations similar to Wikipedia.

== Awards and honours ==
In 2022, Ypi was named one of the world's top ten thinkers by the British magazine Prospect and one of the most important cultural figures by the Frankfurter Allgemeine Zeitung. She was named one of the six most important thinkers of 2023 by El País. Her work has been translated in more than 35 languages and won numerous prizes, including the British Academy "Brian Barry" Prize for excellence in Political Science and a Leverhulme Prize for outstanding research achievements. She was elected to the Academia Europaea in 2020 and is a member of the jury of the Deutscher Memorial Prize.

Ypi was elected a Fellow of the British Academy in 2024.

== Selected bibliography ==
- The Meaning of Partisanship (with Jonathan White), Oxford University Press, 2016.
- Global Justice and Avant-Garde Political Agency, Oxford University Press, 2012.
- Kant and Colonialism: Historical and Critical Perspectives (co-edited with Katrin Flikschuh), Oxford University Press, 2014.
- Migration in Political Theory: The Ethics of Movement and Membership (co-edited with Sarah Fine), Oxford University Press, 2016.
- Free: Coming of Age at the End of History, Penguin, 2021.
- The Architectonic of Reason: Purposiveness and Systematic Unity in Kant's Critique of Pure Reason, Oxford University Press, 2021.
- Indignity: A Life Reimagined, Penguin Books, 2025.
