= Peter Wagner =

Peter Wagner may refer to:

- Peter Wagner (Manitoba politician) (1916–1995), Canadian politician, member of the Legislative Assembly of Manitoba
- Peter Wagner (social theorist), German social theorist
- Peter J. Wagner (born 1964), American paleontologist and Smithsonian curator
- Peter Joseph Wagner (1795–1884), American politician, U.S. Representative from New York
- C. Peter Wagner (1930–2016), American religious leader, seminary professor
- Peavy Wagner (born 1964), German heavy metal musician, lead singer and bass player for the band Rage
- Pete Wagner (born 1955), political cartoonist, activist, author and caricature artist
- Peter M. Wagner, German civil servant of the European Commission

== See also ==
- Peter Wegner (disambiguation)
