= Françoise Vergès =

French political scientist, historian and feminist (born 1952)

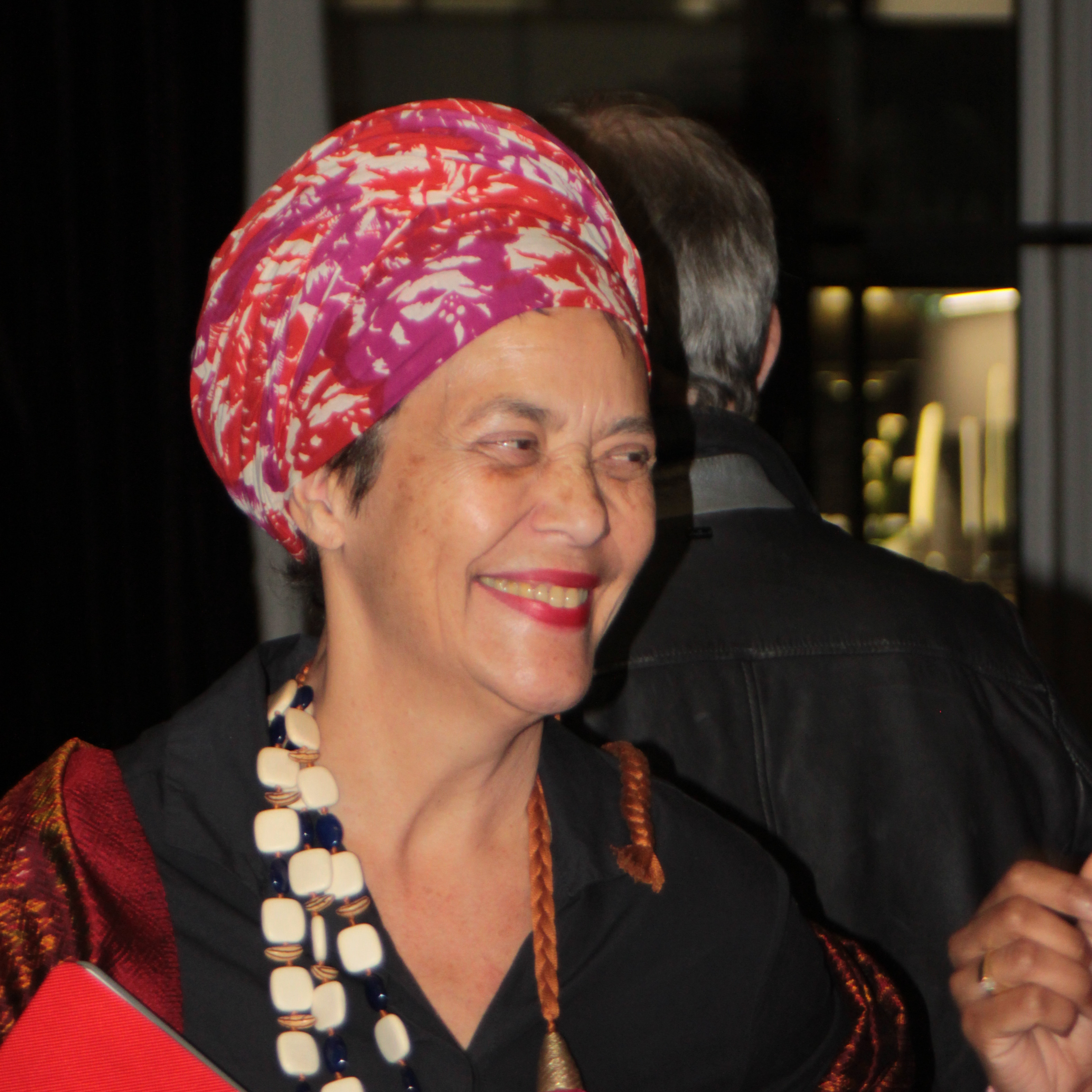
- Vergès in 2016
- Born: 23 January 1952 (age 74); Paris, France
- Occupations: Academic, author, activist
- Parent(s): Paul Vergès and Laurence Deroin
- Relatives: Jacques Vergès (uncle)

Academic background
- Education: University of California, San Diego; University of California, Berkeley
- Thesis: Monsters and Revolutionaries: Colonial Family Romance and Métissage (1995)

Academic work
- Discipline: Political theory History
- Sub-discipline: Postcolonial studies
- Institutions: University College London; Sussex University; Goldsmiths, University of London; Brown University; The Africa Institute
- Notable works: A Program of Absolute Disorder: Decolonizing the Museum (2024); A Decolonial Feminism (2021)

Françoise Vergès (born 23 January 1952) is a French political scientist, historian, film producer, independent curator, activist and public educator. Her work focuses on postcolonial studies and decolonial feminism.

Her book A Decolonial Feminism was published in English in 2021, translated by Ashley J. Bohrer along with Vergès, with the support of an English PEN Translates award.

== Family ==
Vergès was born in Paris, France, grew up in Réunion and Algeria before returning to Paris to study and become a journalist.

Vergès is the second daughter of Laurence Deroin and of the communist politician Paul Vergès. She is also the niece of Jacques Vergès, lawyer and anti-colonial activist famous in France for his defense of FLN militants during the Algerian War of Independence.

Her father, the son of a doctor and consul during the colonial era, has been a French deputy, member of the European Parliament, senator, president of the Regional Council of Réunion and mayor of Le Port. Her paternal grandmother was Vietnamese. Her great-great-grandmother, Marie Hermelinde Million des Marquets is from a slave-owning family in La Réunion. They owned a 49 acres plantation and, according to the 1848 act, "121 slaves, from which 66 were Creoles, 12 Malagasies, 39 Mozambicans and 4 Indians or Malays".

Her mother, Laurence Deroin, was a Zoreille born on 22 September 1924 in Ivry-sur-Seine and died on 3 November 2012 at her home in La Possession. An activist and employee of the French Communist Party (PCF), she worked for the Ministry of Reconstruction and Urban Planning, which was headed by Raymond Aubrac until the departure of the Communists from the government, and for Laurent Casanova. The Deroin-Vergès couple met in 1947 at the colonial section of the French Communist Party in Paris and got married in 1949. Laurence Deroin first came to Reunion Island at the age of 30 in 1954, when her father-in-law Raymond Vergès wanted her husband Paul to take over the PCF federation in Reunion. She was an activist in the Union of French Women, and was one of the founders of the Union of Women of Reunion (UFR) in 1958. After running a bookshop in Saint-Denis (La Librairie des Mascareignes) for a few years, Laurence Deroin worked for the newspaper Témoignages, where she ran a column on the status of women. She was also a candidate in various elections for the PCR.

Vergès's older sister Claude is a doctor, born on 1 August 1949, married to Dr Edmundo Lopez Caizadilla; she has lived in Panama since 1974, and has a daughter, Sandra Lopez. Vergès also has two brothers who are leading figures in the PCR: Pierre and Laurent.

Vergès moved to the US in 1983, studying at the University of California, San Diego, and Berkeley.

== Career ==
Vergès was a journalist and editor at Panthéon-Sorbonne University.

She earned a PhD in Political Science, from the University of California, Berkeley, in May 1995, with a thesis published under the title Monsters and revolutionaries: Colonial family romance and grooming. She took as a plot the political history of Réunion from its origins to the present day, to trace the journey of her family engaged in politics since 1930.

In 1996, she taught at the University of Sussex, and was a member of the political science department at the Center for Cultural Studies at Goldsmiths, University of London. She studied the problem of colonial slavery and the phenomena of creolization using political theories incorporating postcolonial logic.

In 2008, Vergès became the president of the National Committee for the Memory and History of Slavery after serving as vice-president. She was appointed chairperson of the committee in 2009. The possible renewal of her mandate led to controversy in 2012–2013.

In 2009, she served as an expert transversale within the framework of the Overseas Estates General.

For several years, she served as the scientific director of the Maison des Civilisation set de l'Unité Réunionnaise (MCUR). Her appointment to the project by her father, as well as the project itself, were subject to debate in Réunion. The journalist Pierrot Dupuy filed an unsuccessful civil suit against Paul Vergès for conflict of interest in appointing his daughter to the position. In February 2010 the Commission of Public Inquiry reported favorably on MCUR's scientific work to the prefect Michel Lalande. MCUR's scientific project was subsequently terminated after strong opposition expressed at the polls and the election victory of Didier Robert to the Regional Council of Réunion.

In 2017, Vergès was appointed to the "Mission of the memory of slavery, treaties and their abolitions" public interest group.

Vergès is also an Honorary Senior Research Fellow at the Sarah Parker Remond Centre for the Study of Racism and Racialisation at University College London.

== Feminism ==
A feminist activist, Vergès collaborated with the journal Women in Motion, a monthly and weekly, published between 1978 and 1982, and with the collection "Women in struggle of all countries", at Éditions des Femmes, from 1981 to 1983. Leading her feminist and anti-racist struggles, Vergès has collaborated with the association Rualité created by the hip-hop artist Bintou Dembélé.

Vergès is a member of the MAFED (Collective of the March of Women for Dignity), a group that the political scientist Laurent de Boissieu located in the political field of racialism and defines as close to the Indigenous Party of the Republic. She is also a member of the College of Diversity at the Ministry of Culture and a founding member of the Decolonizing the Arts collective.

Vergès signed the calls to the Marches for Justice and Dignity, as well as a large number of petitions defending differentialist and "decolonial" positions, including "Stop the Cyberbullying Against the Controversial Lallab Association"; "Against media lynching and slanderous anti-racists; an intolerable persecution against the Traore family"; "We can disagree with the ideas of Houria Bouteldja, so let's debate"; "For the continuation of the Fight against Islamophobia conference", the petition of support to Sonia Nour following her statements relating a terrorist to a martyr, the petition of support to Tariq Ramadan indicted for rape, accusing the French justice of unequal treatment and / or racism, along with Houria Bouteldja, Sihame Assbague, Marwan Muhammad, Alain Gresh, Nabil Ennasri and François Burgat.

== Works ==
- De l'Esclave au citoyen, with Philippe Haudrère, Paris: Gallimard, 1998, coll. "Découvertes Gallimard Texto" (#5), (translated in chinois simplifié, 2006)
- Monsters and revolutionaries. Colonial family romance and "métissage", Duke University Press, 1999
- Abolir l'esclavage. Une utopie coloniale, les ambiguïtés d'une politique humanitaire, Paris: Albin Michel, 2001
- Racines et itinéraires de l'unité réunionnaise. La Réunion: Graphica-Région Réunion, 2003
- Amarres. Créolisations india-océanes, with Jean-Claude Carpanin Marimoutou, Paris: Ka, 2003; Paris: L'Harmattan, 2005
- La Mémoire enchaînée. Questions sur l'esclavage, Paris: Albin Michel, 2006
- La République coloniale. Essai sur une utopie, with Pascal Blanchard et Nicolas Bancel, Paris: Hachette, 2006, coll. " Pluriel »
- Nègre, je suis, Nègre je resterai. Entretiens avec Aimé Césaire, Paris: Albin Michel, 2007
- La Colonisation française, avec Nicolas Bancel et Pascal Blanchard, Toulouse, Éditions Milan, coll. " Les Esentiels ", 2007
- Nègre. Nègrier. Traite des nègres. Three articles in the Grand Dictionnaire universel, Pierre Larousse, Saint-Pourçain, Bleu autour, 2007
- Fractures postcoloniales, with Nicolas Bancel, Pascal Blanchard and Achille Mbembe, Paris: La Découverte, 2010
- L'Homme prédateur, ce que nous enseigne l'esclavage sur notre temps, Paris: Albin Michel, 2011, coll. " Bibliothèque Idées »
- Le ventre des femmes, Capitalisme, racialisation, féminisme, Paris: La fabrique éditions, 2017
- Un féminisme décolonial, Paris: La fabrique éditions, 2019

Works in English

- Monsters and Revolutionaries: Colonial Family Romance and Métissage, Duke University Press, 1999, ISBN 9780822322948
- Rod Edmond, Vanessa Smith {eds} "The Island of Wandering Souls : Processes of Creolization, Politics of Emancipation and the Problematic of Absence on Reunion Island", Islands in History and Representation, Routledge, 2003. ISBN 9780415286664
- The Wombs of Women: Race, Capital, Feminism, Duke University Press, 2020, translated and with an introduction by Kaiama L. Glover, ISBN 9781478009412
- A Decolonial Feminism, Pluto Books, 2021, translated by Ashley J. Bohrer ISBN 9780745341125
