= Judith Mackrell =

English critic and biographer

Judith Mackrell is an English non-fiction writer.

== Early life and education ==
Mackrell graduated from the University of York and the University of Oxford. She was a part-time lecturer at Oxford, Oxford Polytechnic and the University of Roehampton.

== Writing ==
Mackrell was The Guardian's dance critic for 23 years up to 2019, when a writer in Dance Magazine said "There was always something to learn from Mackrell’s clear-eyed elegance".

She co-authored Darcey Bussell's 1998 Life in Dance.

In 2000, she co-authored with Debra Craine the Oxford Dictionary of Dance; the two authors produced a second edition of the work in 2010.

Bloomsbury Ballerina, her 2008 biography of Lydia Lopokova, the wife of economist John Maynard Keynes, was shortlisted for the 2008 Costa Book Award for Biography.

Her 2013 Flappers considered the lives of six women of the Jazz Age: Diana Cooper, Nancy Cunard, Tallulah Bankhead, Josephine Baker, Tamara de Lempicka and Zelda Fitzgerald. In contrast, her 2021 Going with the Boys, published in the United States as The Correspondents, covered five women war correspondents and a war photographer who worked during the Second World War: Virginia Cowles, Clare Hollingworth, Sigrid Schultz, Martha Gellhorn, Lee Miller, and Helen Kirkpatrick.

Her 2017 The Unfinished Palazzo tells the story of the Palazzo Venier dei Leoni in Venice, and of three women involved in it in the early 20th century: Luisa Casati, Doris Castlerosse and Peggy Guggenheim; the palazzo now houses the Peggy Guggenheim Collection.

Artists, Siblings, Visionaries, her 2026 joint biography of sibling artists Gwen John and Augustus John, was shortlisted for the 2026 Women's Prize for Non-Fiction.

== Selected publications ==
- Mackrell, Judith (1992). Out of line: the story of British new dance. London: Dance Books. ISBN 9781852730383.
- Mackrell, Judith (1997). Reading dance. London: Michael Joseph. ISBN 9780718138516.
- Bussell, Darcey; Mackrell, Judith (1998). Life in dance. London: Century. ISBN 978-0712680660.
- Craine, Debra; Mackrell, Judith (2000). The Oxford dictionary of dance. Oxford: Oxford Univ. Press. ISBN 9780198604006. (2nd ed, 2010: ISBN 9780199563449)
- Mackrell, Judith (2008). Bloomsbury Ballerina: Lydia Lopokova, Imperial Dancer and Mrs John Maynard Keynes. Orion. ISBN 9781780227085.
- Mackrell, Judith (2014). Flappers: six women of a dangerous generation. New York: Sarah Crichton Books/Farrar, Straus and Giroux. ISBN 978-0374156084.
- Mackrell, Judith (2017). The unfinished Palazzo: life, love and art in Venice: the stories of Luisa Casati, Doris Castelrosse and Peggy Guggenheim. London: Thames and Hudson. ISBN 978-0500518663.
- Mackrell, Judith (2021). Going with the boys: six extraordinary women writing from the front line. London: Pan Macmillan. ISBN 978-1509882939.
- Mackrell, Judith (2025). Artists, siblings, visionaries: the lives and loves of Augustus and Gwen John. London: Picador. ISBN 978-1529095845.
