= The White Peacock =

1911 novel by D. H. Lawrence

- Cover of the first American edition
- Author: D. H. Lawrence
- Language: English
- Publisher: Heinemann (UK); Duffield & Co. (US)
- Publication date: 1911
- Publication place: United Kingdom
- Media type: Print (hardback & paperback)
- Pages: 496
- Followed by: The Trespasser
- Text: The White Peacock at Wikisource

The White Peacock is the first novel by D. H. Lawrence, published in 1911. Lawrence started the novel in 1906 and then rewrote it three times. The early versions had the working title of Laetitia.

Maurice Greiffenhagen's 1891 painting "An Idyll" inspired the novel. The painting had "a profound effect" on Lawrence, who wrote: "As for Greiffenhagen's 'Idyll', it moves me almost as if I were in love myself. Under its intoxication, I have flirted madly this Christmas."

The novel is set in the Eastwood area of his youth and is narrated in the first person by a character named Cyril Beardsall. It involves themes such as the damage associated with mismatched marriages, and the border country between town and country. A misanthropic gamekeeper makes an appearance, in some ways the prototype of Mellors in Lawrence's last novel, Lady Chatterley's Lover. The book includes some notable description of nature and the impact of industrialisation on the countryside and the town.

== Synopsis ==
The novel is set in Nethermere (fictional name for real-life Eastwood) and is narrated by Cyril Beardsall, whose sister Laetitia (Lettie) is involved in a love triangle with two young men, George Saxton and Leslie Tempest. She eventually marries Leslie, even though she feels sexually drawn to George. Spurned by Lettie, George marries the conventional Meg. Both his and Lettie's marriages end in unhappiness, as George slides into alcoholism at the novel's close.

== Publication history ==
The White Peacock was published on January 19, 1911 by Duffield & Co. in the United States and a day later by Heinemann in the United Kingdom.

== Reception ==
According to the biographer Brenda Maddox, The White Peacock received generally positive reviews in The Observer, The Morning Post, and The Daily News.

Maddox writes in that The White Peacock reflects the influence of the German philosophers Arthur Schopenhauer and Friedrich Nietzsche, and that its theme is "that Christianity has alienated humankind from nature and destroyed pagan wisdom". Maddox describes it as "an uneven early work obscured by Lawrence's later books", but praises it for its "beauty and power" and for being "rich in images of a nature red in tooth and claw." She argues that while Lawrence's works have been seen as Freudian, the "primitive rage against mothers" in The White Peacock better fits the ideas of the psychoanalyst Melanie Klein. She maintains that the novel has homoerotic elements, apparent in the relationship between George and Cyril, and notes that the novelist E. M. Forster saw it as having sexual implications unrecognised by Lawrence.

Biographer Frances Wilson writes, "His pre-Frieda novels, The White Peacock and The Trespasser, are chicken vol au vent: conventional in form, lyrical in style, Hardyesque in plot".

== Editions ==
- The White Peacock (1911), edited by Andrew Robertson, Cambridge University Press, 1983, ISBN 0-521-22267-2
