= Arifa Akbar =

English writer and theatre critic

Arifa Akbar FRSL
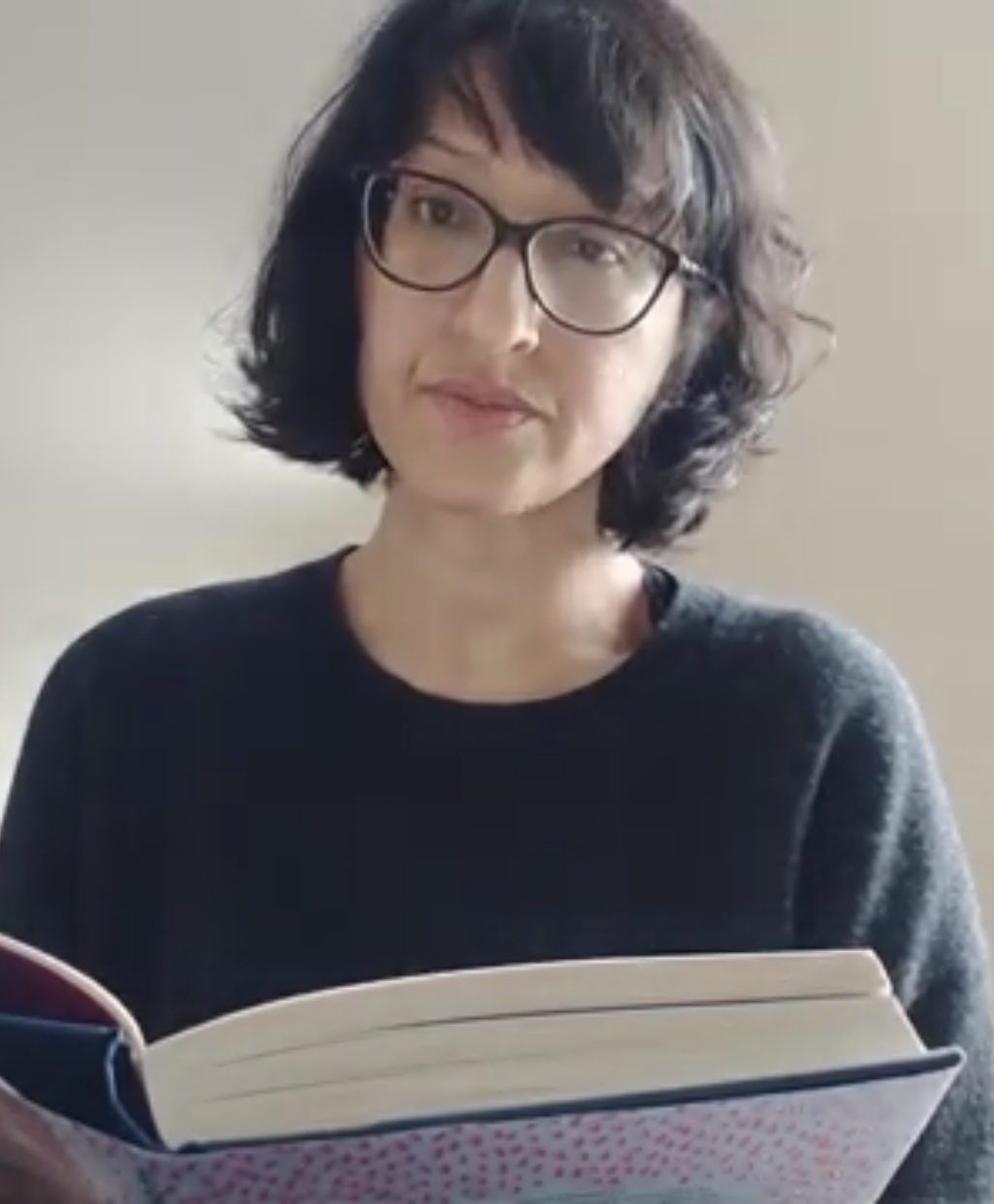
- Akbar in 2022
- Born: London, England
- Education: University of Edinburgh
- Occupations: Writer and theatre critic
- Years active: 2001–present
- Employer: The Guardian

Arifa Akbar is an English writer who has been chief theatre critic at The Guardian newspaper since 2019. She previously served as literary editor of The Independent and before that, a news reporter. Her memoir Consumed: A Sister's Story (2021) was shortlisted for a number of accolades.

== Early life ==
Akbar was born in London, England, and was three years old when she went to Pakistan with her parents, who had hoped to resettle there. She spent the first few years of her life moving between London and Lahore, until settling in the former city in 1977. Her family lived in an abandoned building on Hampstead High Street before finding a flat on Fellows Road, where Akbar grew up.

Akbar and her sister Fauzia attended St Paul's Church of England Primary School in Primrose Hill and then Parliament Hill School. She graduated from the University of Edinburgh.

== Career ==
Akbar joined The Independent in 2001, working as a news reporter. Akbar then became an arts correspondent and was promoted to literary editor of the publication, a position she held until 2016. She subsequently served as head of content at Unbound and arts editor of Tortoise Media. She was also founding editor of Boundless Magazine. In 2019, Akbar was appointed chief theatre critic at The Guardian.

In 2020, Sceptre (a Hodder & Stoughton imprint) acquired the rights to publish Akbar's debut non-fiction book, Consumed: A Sister's Story, in 2021. The memoir charts the turbulent life of Akbar's late older sister Fauzia, who suddenly died from tuberculosis in 2016. Consumed: A Sister's Story was shortlisted for the Jhalak Prize, the Costa Book Award for Biography, and the Ackerley Prize. The book was also longlisted for the Baillie Gifford Prize.

Akbar reunited with Sceptre for the publication in 2025 of her second non-fiction book Wolf Moon: A Woman's Journey Into the Night. Containing vignettes of her relationship with night time, she said the book "began as a singular question: Why am I afraid of darkness?"

Akbar was elected a Fellow of the Royal Society of Literature (FRSL) in 2026.

== Bibliography ==
- Consumed: A Sister's Story (2021)
- Wolf Moon: A Woman's Journey Into the Night (2025)

== Accolades ==
Year	Award	Category	Title	Result	Ref.
2021	Jhalak Prize		Consumed: A Sister's Story	Shortlisted	
2021	Baillie Gifford Prize		Consumed: A Sister's Story	Longlisted	
2022	Costa Book Awards	Biography	Consumed: A Sister's Story	Shortlisted	
2022	Ackerley Prize		Consumed: A Sister's Story	Shortlisted	
