= Maggie Fergusson =

British biographer and editor

Magdalen Margaret Christian Fergusson OBE FRSL is a British biographer and editor. In addition to serving as literary editor for The Tablet and as editor of the Royal Society of Literature Review, she is the writer of two biographies on British writers: George Mackay Brown: The Life (2006) and Michael Morpurgo: War Child to War Horse (2013).

== Biography ==
While working at the Royal Society of Literature (RSL) as secretary (a position she had held since 1989), Fergusson became interested in the writer George Mackay Brown after finding his work in the society's library. After spending some time working in the financial industry and for Harpers & Queen, she was sent by The Times to her first visit to Orkney, where she would interview Mackay Brown in anticipation of his upcoming novel Vinland.

With the support of Mackay Brown and his editor Hugo Brunner, Fergusson decided to write a biography on him. Relying on sources like collections of uncatalogued letters associated with Mackay Brown and the assistance of Mackay Brown's siblings and literary executor Archie Bevan, the final product, George Mackay Brown: The Life, was released from Mackay Brown's publisher John Murray in 2006. The book was shortlisted for the 2006 Costa Book Award for Biography. In 2013, she published Michael Morpurgo: War Child to War Horse, another biography about a British novelist.

In addition to her contributions to national newspapers, she has worked as the literary editor for The Tablet and as editor of the Royal Society of Literature Review. In addition to her role as secretary, she has also served as a literary advisor in the RSL.

She was appointed Fellow of the Royal Society of Literature in 2010. She was made Member of the Order of the British Empire at the 2012 New Year Honours "for services to Literature".

Fergusson has two daughters.

== Publications ==
- George Mackay Brown: The Life (2006)
- Michael Morpurgo: War Child to War Horse (2013)
