= Peter Wegner =

Peter Wegner may refer to:

- Peter Wegner (computer scientist) (1932–2017), professor of computer science at Brown University, Rhode Island, United States
- Peter Wegner (American artist) (born 1963)
- Peter Wegner (Australian artist)

== See also ==
- Peter Wagner (disambiguation)
