= Brad Evans (author) =

British academic and author

- Born: March 2, 1974 (age 52); Rhondda, Wales, UK
- Occupation: Academic
- Spouse: Chantal Meza
- Website: www.brad-evans.co.uk

Brad Evans is a British academic, and Professor of Political Violence at the department of Politics, Languages & International Studies at the University of Bath, United Kingdom. He is the founder and director of the Centre for the Study of Violence.

== Academic Work ==
Evans holds two master's degrees from the University of Leeds, in development economics and international relations. His PhD, titled "War for the Politics of Life", dealt with forms of resistance to liberal regimes of power, during which he spent visiting the Zapatista communities of Chiapas, Mexico.

Evans was previously Senior Lecturer of International Relations at the School of Sociology, Politics and International Studies at the University of Bristol. He has been a visiting fellow at the Committee on Global Thought at Columbia University, New York (2013–14) and distinguished society fellow at Dartmouth College, New Hampshire (2017).

Evans' writing presents political, philosophical and aesthetic perspectives on violence.

== Media Profile ==
In 2011, Evans founded the Histories of Violence project which sought to explore 'the theoretical, aesthetic and empirical dimensions to violence'. As part of this project, Evans co-directed a documentary, Ten Years of Terror, with Simon Critchley. This was screened at 11am at the Solomon K. Guggenheim on the 9, 12, and 13 September 2011.

As a further extension of the Histories of Violence Project, from 15 December 2015 to 23 February 2017, Evans hosted a series of conversations on violence for the opinion section of the New York Times, co-authoring ten pieces with thinkers such as Simon Critchley, Bracha Ettinger, Zygmunt Bauman, Richard Bernstein and Simona Forti. This series was continued at the Los Angeles Review of Books, where Evans has co-authored articles with various artists and thinkers including Oliver Stone, Russell Brand, John Akomfrah, Elaine Scarry, Malcolm London, Jake Chapman, and Marina Abramovic.

As a guest-editor at the Los Angeles Review of Books, in 2015 Evans curated a collection of essays dedicated to the commemoration of the death of the French philosopher Gilles Deleuze. In 2020, he curated a collection of short essays by various thinkers and artists in self-isolation titled "The Quarantine Files. Following this, in September 2021 he curated a collection of essays to commemorate the 20th anniversary of 9/11 under the title "When the Towers Fell".

Evans has also authored or co-authored ten articles in other major broadsheet papers: three times for Times Higher Education, twice for the Independent and Newsweek, and once each for the New York Times, The Guardian, and the Times. He is now a regular contributor to the online politics magazine UnHerd.

== Works ==
As of May 2023, Evans' published academic work encompasses three single-authored books, two co-authored books, two single edited volumes and five co-edited volumes. He has co-edited five journal special issues, and produced eleven single-authored peer-reviewed journal papers, twenty three co-authored journal papers, eleven single-authored book chapters, thirteen co-authored book chapters. He has also written a part personal memoir and peoples history of life growing up in the South Wales mining valleys, along with co-authored a graphic novel.

Personal Memoir/Peoples History

- How Black was my Valley: Poverty & Abandonment in a Post-Industrial Heartland (London, Repeater Books: 2024)

Single-authored Academic Books

- Ecce Humanitas: Beholding the Pain of Humanity (New York, Columbia University Press: 2021)
- Liberal Terror (Cambridge, Polity Press: 2013)

Co-authored Academic Books

- Disposable Futures: The Seduction of Violence in the Age of the Spectacle (San Francisco, City Lights: 2015) (with Henry A. Giroux)
- Resilient Life: The Art of Living Dangerously (Cambridge, Polity Press: 2014) (with Julian Reid)

Co-edited Academic Books

- When the Towers Fell: Commemorating the 20th Anniversary of 9/11 (Los Angeles, LA Review of Books Press: 2022)
- Conversations on Violence: An Anthology (London, Pluto Press: 2021) (Co-edited with Adrian Parr)
- The Quarantine Files: Thinkers in Self-Isolation (Los Angeles, LA Review of Books Press: 2020)
- Violence: Humans in Dark Times (San Francisco, City Lights: 2018) (Co-edited with Natasha Lennard)
- Histories of Violence: An Introduction to Post War Critical Thought (London, Zed Books: 2017) (Co-edited with Terrell Carver)
- Deleuze & Fascism: Security, War & Aesthetics (London, Routledge: 2013) (Co-edited with Julian Reid)

Single-authored Non-Academic Books

- The Atrocity Exhibition: Life in an Age of Total Violence (Los Angeles, LA Review of Books Press: 2019)

Co-authored Graphic Novels

- Portraits of Violence: An Illustrated History of Radical Thinking (London, New Internationalist: 2016) (with Sean Michael Wilson)
