= Adrian Parr =

Australian philosopher (born 1967)

Adrian Elisheva Parr Zaretsky
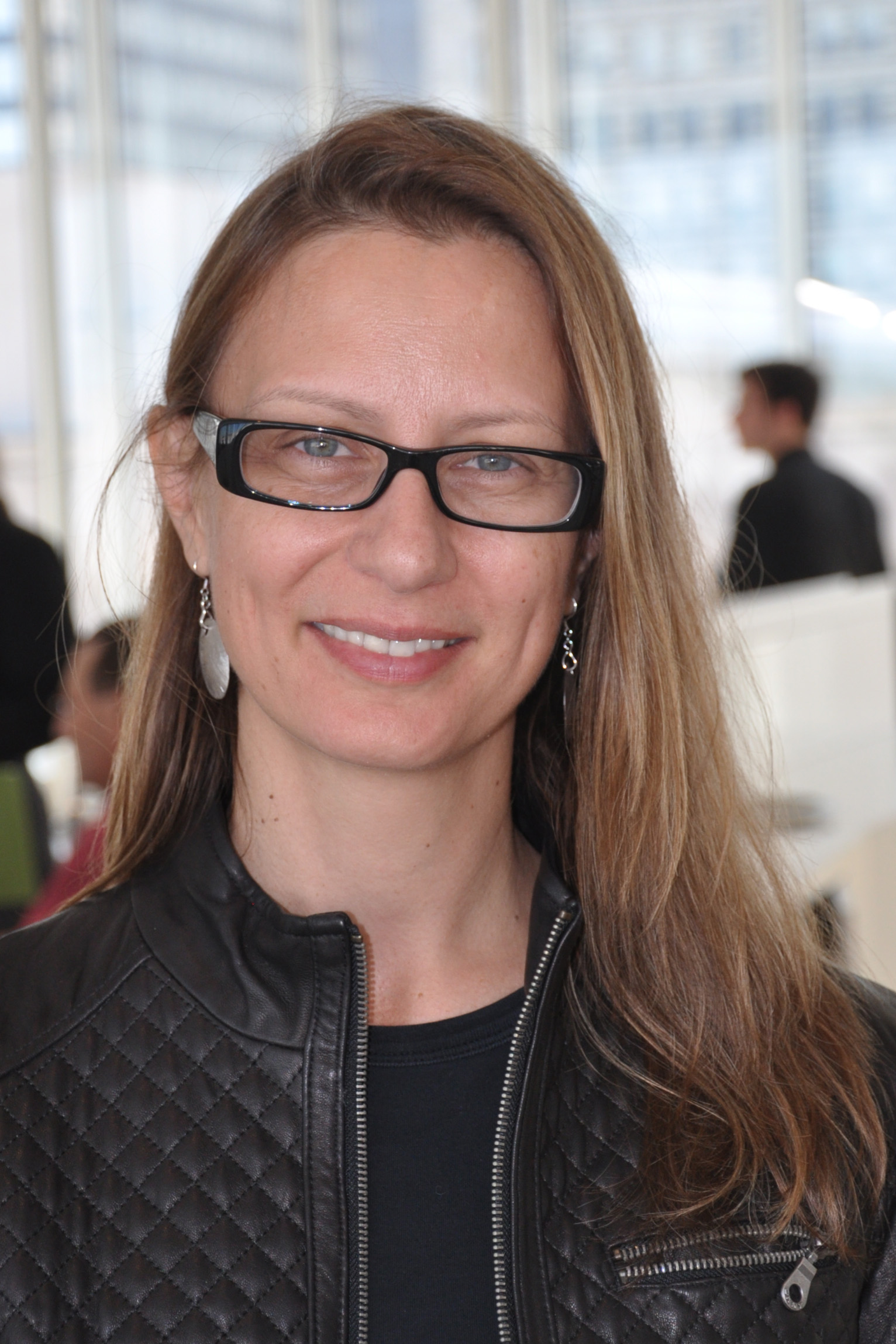
- Born: 1967 (age 58–59); Sydney, Australia
- Education: Monash University
- Writing career
- Subject: Contemporary philosophy
- Website: adrian-parr.com

Adrian Elisheva Parr Zaretsky (born 1967) is an Australian-born philosopher, creative, filmmaker, and dean of the College of Design at the University of Oregon, United States. She specializes in cultural theory and eco-criticism. In addition, she published on sustainability culture, climate change politics, and creative practice.

== Biography ==
Adrian Elisheva Parr Zaretsky was born in Sydney, Australia. She completed her bachelor's degree with First Class Honors in Philosophy at Deakin University in 1998, followed by a Master's in Philosophy in 2000. She began her PhD studies under the direction of the feminist philosopher Claire Colebrook. Her PhD dissertation "Creative Production: From Da Vinci to Deleuze" was revised and published by Edwin Mellen Press in 2003.

Between 2003 and 2006 she was a professor of cultural criticism at Savannah College of Art and Design. Whilst in Savannah, Parr Zaretsky co-founded (with Avantika Bawa and Celina Jeffery) Drain: A Journal of Contemporary Art and Culture.

In 2006 she moved to the University of Cincinnati. She was a tenured Full Professor with a joint appointment in the Department of Political Science and the School of Architecture and Interior Design at the University of Cincinnati.

In 2011 she was awarded the Rieveschl Award for Scholarly and Creative Work. This distinguished award recognizes a University of Cincinnati faculty for professional achievement in creative and scholarly work.

In 2013, she was appointed Director of The Charles Phelps Taft Research Center and Chair of Taft Faculty.

In July 2017, she was one of the founding signatories for the Geneva Actions on Human Water Security.

In March 2018, Parr Zaretsky was appointed Dean of the College of Architecture, Planning and Public Affairs (CAPPA) at the University of Texas at Arlington (UTA).

In 2020, she was named a Senior Fellow of the Design Futures Council. In November 2020, Parr Zaretsky was named incoming Dean of the University of Oregon College of Design and officially joined the college in March 2021. During the 2026 University of Oregon commencement ceremony she gave a speech, during which she collapsed due to the extreme heat.

Parr Zaretsky has been invited to curate and exhibit at the European Cultural Center's Venice Architecture Biennale twice and once with the Venice Biennale of Art. Parr Zaretsky curated an exhibition on Watershed Urbanism in 2021 and on Transpecies Design in 2023. In 2026 Parr Zaretsky exhibited with artist Liu Shiming at the ECC. Parr recounted to artist Amadour, "the project would have been overwhelming, so I decided to focus specifically on women's experiences, which became the guiding framework." She has served as a UNESCO water chair since 2013. In 2019 she was appointed UNESCO Chair on Water and Human Settlements of the Future.

== Public outreach ==
In November 2013, Parr Zaretsky and Michael Zaretsky co-directed the Future Cities; Livable Futures symposium, a public event that provided a platform for attendees to share and discuss the future of urban life. Future Cities; Livable Futures featured an interdisciplinary panel of speakers focused on topics such as sustainable urban development, increasing population, inadequate infrastructure, poor social services, escalating health problems, and challenges posed by climate change.

In 2014 she founded Louder Than a Bomb Cincy, working with local organizations, University of Cincinnati affiliations, spoken-word poets, and Cincinnati public school district teachers to bring the Louder Than a Bomb youth poetry slam to Cincinnati.

In addition to community outreach, Parr Zaretsky has spoken on and been interviewed for her views on climate change, environmental degradation, and sustainable development. In her capacity as a UNESCO water chair, she is a strong advocate for culturally appropriate design solutions for water justice. In addition to publishing on her UNESCO related field work she sets out to humanize data through film and visual art. In an NPR interview for World Water Day she speaks of the ongoing struggle for clean, accessible, and affordable water the world over. Again on public radio she speaks of the connection between environmental racism and the struggles of Native American communities to survive the contamination of their water supplies. Later, in a television interview with the Newsmakers, she describes Hurricane Harvey as more of a man-made than a natural disaster.

In an interview for The New York Times with journalist Natasha Lennard, Parr Zaretsky discusses how environmental damage and climate change are not only forms violence but a crime against humanity. In his op-ed in The New York Times Brad Evans expanded upon Parr Zaretsky's framework of climate violence explaining that environmental degradation is a crime against humanity. Evans writes, she "also posed the question of what a crime against humanity actually means in such a context. It turns out, there are many ways in which damage to the environment rises to that level. This type of violence presents profound existential questions about what it means to be human and the ontological crimes (i.e., a crime against the human as such) some of us wage against ourselves."

== Films ==
In 2016, she produced, wrote, and narrated her first documentary, The Intimate Realities of Water. Parr Zaretsky co-directed the film with Sean Hughes. In addition, Sean Hughes was the editor and Jon Hughes, his father, was the director of photography. When the documentary was released in 2016, it was screened at numerous independent film festivals in the United States where it went on to win 13 awards. The film follows the lives of four women living in the slums of Nairobi, documenting the water and sanitation challenges they face.

From 2014 to 2017 she produced and directed the TAFTtalks and H2Otalks series. TAFTtalks concentrated on drawing out issues of interest beyond the academy and focused on big, contemporary ideas, and concerns. Among those she has interviewed for TAFTtalks include Tara Houska and Rosi Braidotti. Houska is a staunch activist of Native American rights. She is an Ojibwe of Saulteaux, Couchiching First Nation and is the founding board member of Not Your Mascots. Houska was also the Native American adviser for Bernie Sanders, during his presidential campaign, and Houska is the National Campaigns Director for Honor the Earth. Braidotti is a Distinguished University Professor and the director of the Centre for the Humanities at Utrecht University in the Netherlands.

The H2Otalks were featured as a part of the 50th anniversary of the UNESCO Water Programmes during the 38th UNESCO General Conference, as part of the "50 Years, 50 Movies on Water," in November 2015. Those she has interviewed include prominent environmentalist Bill McKibben.

In her capacity as the UNESCO Chair on Water and Human Settlements, she produced and co-directed Thirsty and Drowning in America, with Sean and Jon Hughes in 2018. She spent time with three different tribal communities over a three-year period of time – Inupiaq on Sarichef Island in Alaska, LaDonna of the Lakota in Dakota, and the Biloxi-Chitamacha-Choctaw tribe on Isle de Jean Charles in Louisiana – learning about the water challenges of each tribe, including sea level rise because of climate change and water contamination.

Parr Zaretsky has produced, edited, and directed two additional award-winning films, Watershed Urbanism in 2020 and A Tale of Three Rocks in 2023.

== Writing ==
Parr Zaretsky has published numerous books on environmental politics, the built environment, and cultural production.

- Parr Zaretsky, Adrian; Zaretsky, Michael (2024). Transpecies Design: Design for a Posthumanist World. London and New York: Routledge. ISBN 9781032516899.
- Parr, Adrian (2022). Earthlings: Imaginative Encounters with the Natural World. New York City, New York: Columbia University Press. ISBN 9780231205498.
- Parr, Adrian; Binagwaho, Agnes; Stirling, Andy; Davies, Andy; Mbow, Cheikh; Hessen, Dag Olav; Bonciani Nader, Helena; Salmi, Jamil; Brown Burkins, Melody; Ramakrishna, Seeram; Serrana, Sol; Schmelkes, Sylvia; Tong, Shijun; McCowan, Tristan (2022). Knowledge-driven actions: transforming higher education for global sustainability. Paris, France: United Nations Educational, Scientific and Cultural Organization. ISBN 9789231005053.
- Parr, Adrian (2017). Birth of a New Earth. New York City, New York: Columbia University Press. ISBN 978-0231180092.
- Parr, Adrian (212). The Wrath of Capital: Neoliberalism and Climate Change Politics. New York City, New York: Columbia University Press. ISBN 0231158289.
- Parr, Adrian; Zaretsky, Michael, eds. (2011). New directions in sustainable design. London: Routledge. ISBN 978-0415780377.
- Parr, Adrian (2009). Hijacking sustainability. Cambridge, Mass.: MIT Press. ISBN 978-0262517461.
- Parr, Adrian (2008). Deleuze and memorial culture: desire, singular memory and the politics of trauma. Edinburgh: Edinburgh University Press. ISBN 978-0748627547.
- Buchanan, Ian; Parr, Adrian, eds. (2006). Deleuze and the contemporary world. Edinburgh: Edinburgh Univ. Press. ISBN 0748623426.
- Parr, Adrian (2005). The Deleuze dictionary. Edinburgh: Edinburgh University Press. ISBN 0748618996.
- Parr, Adrian (2003). Exploring the work of Leonardo da Vinci within the context of contemporary philosophical thought and art. Lewiston, N.Y.: Edwin Mellen Press. ISBN 0773465642.

Parr Zaretsky is a regular contributor to the LA Review of Books series on violence. She has interviewed Serbian performance artist, Marina Abramović, artist Mark Bradford, spoken word artist Malcolm London, and sound artist David Rothenberg. She has written on environmental politics and climate change for a number of publications including "Equitable Action on Climate Now" (October 2013) for the World Financial Review and "Selective Amnesia" (February 2015) for the European Magazine.

== List of awards and honors ==
- Received an ARC (Australia Research Council) Linkage Grant of AU$272,000 for a project, "Curating Cities: A Database of Eco Public Art," 2011.
- George Rieveschl Jr. Award for Creative and/or Scholarly Works, University of Cincinnati, 2011.
- Hillier Memorial Lecture, Cornell University, 2011.
- She has received the following awards for her film, "A Tale of Three Rocks."
  1. Best Experimental Film—Brooklyn International Short Awards, 2023
  2. Best Sound—Melbourne Independent Film Festival, 2023
  3. Best Women Filmmaker in Short—Austin International Arts Festival, 2023
  4. Best Experimental Features—Madrid Arthouse Film Festival, 2023
- She has received the following awards for her film, "Watershed Urbanism."
  1. Best Human Right's Film—Berlin Shorts Award, 2022
- She has received the following awards for her documentary, "The Intimate Realities of Water."
  1. Best Documentary—United International Independent Film Festival in 2016
  2. Finalist Best Documentary—Paris Art Movie Awards, 2016.
  3. Best Cultural Feature—Hollywood International Independent Awards, 2016
  4. Best Writer—Hollywood International Independent Awards, 2016
  5. Best Narration—Hollywood International Independent Awards, 2016
  6. Official Selection—the Louisville International Film Festival, 2016
  7. Board of Directs Award—North Carolina Film Awards, 2016
  8. Best Picture—Los Angeles Independent Film Festival, 2016
  9. Best Woman Film Maker—Los Angeles Independent Film Festival, 2016
  10. Best First-time Film Maker—Los Angeles Independent Film Festival, 2016
  11. Best Documentary Director—Los Angeles Independent Film Festival, 2016
  12. Excellent Award for voice over—Depth of Field Film Festival, 2016
  13. Outstanding Excellence—Best Content/Message Delivery, 2016
  14. Humanitarian Award (Honorable Mention) -- IndieFEST, 2016
  15. Bronze REMI award (ecology/environment) -- Houston International Film Festival (2017)
