= The Trespasser (Lawrence novel) =

1912 novel by D. H. Lawrence

- Author: D. H. Lawrence
- Language: English
- Publisher: Gerald Duckworth and Company Ltd
- Publication date: 1912
- Publication place: United Kingdom
- Media type: Print
- Pages: 292
- Preceded by: The White Peacock
- Followed by: Sons and Lovers
- Text: The Trespasser at Wikisource

The Trespasser is a 1912 novel by D. H. Lawrence. Set mostly on the Isle of Wight, it tells the story of Siegmund, a married man with children, and his adulterous affair with Helena.

Originally it was titled the Saga of Siegmund and drew upon the experiences of a friend of Lawrence, Helen Corke, and her adulterous relationship with a married man that ended with his suicide. Lawrence worked from Corke's diary, with her permission, but also urged her to publish; which she did in 1933 as Neutral Ground.

== Adaptation ==
Lawrence's novel was adapted into a 1981 television film starring Alan Bates as Siegmund; Pauline Moran as Helena; Margaret Whiting as Beatrice, wife of Siegmund; and Dinah Stabb as Louisa, Helena's friend; among others. It was directed by Colin Gregg and written by Hugh Stoddart.

== Standard edition ==
- The Trespasser (1912), edited by Elizabeth Mansfield, Cambridge University Press, 1981, ISBN 0-521-22264-8
