= Nabil Fayyad =

Syrian researcher

- نبيل فياض
- Born: Mouhamad Nabil Fayyad; 1955; Al-Qaryatayn, Homs Governorate, Syria
- Died: 21 August 2022 (aged 66–67); Damascus, Syria
- Burial place: Tell el-Nasr Cemetery, Homs
- Education: Damascus University
- Occupations: Author, researcher

Nabil Fayyad, (Arabic: نبيل فياض, born Mouhamad Nabil Fayyad; 1955 – 21 August 2022) was a Syrian intellectual and researcher known for his critical examinations of Islam. Born into a Sunni Muslim family, Fayad drew controversy throughout his career for his outspoken views on religious issues.

He produced more than 70 works on religion and politics, including both original writings and translations. His notable publications include Differences Among Qur'anic Manuscripts, Nietzsche and Religion, Christ and Mythology, and An Introduction to the Comparative Religion Project. Fayyad was detained by intelligence services on October 3, 2004, in Al-Naseriyah, Rif Dimashq, without clear or publicly stated reasons. He was released after 33 days. During his detention, he was represented by attorney Anwar al-Bunni. Fayyad served as the official spokesperson of the Liberal Gathering in Syria, an organization he co-founded with Jihad Nasra. The group was disbanded while he was in detention.

== Personal life ==
Of Najdi origin, Fayad was born in Homs in 1955 and began his primary education in the town of Al-Qaryatayn. His family later moved to Homs, where he completed his preparatory studies at Khalid ibn al-Walid School and his secondary education at Abdul Hamid al-Zahrawi High School. After obtaining his secondary school certificate, he moved to Egypt to pursue studies in languages.

In addition to his native Arabic, Fayad was proficient in English, Hebrew, German, French, and Latin.

He died on 21 August 2022, at a hospital in Damascus, after a five-year illness with cancer.

== Positions ==
In a political program discussing the Arab Spring, Fayad rejected the description of Syria under the Ba'ath Party as a secular state. He explained that, in Syria, there were effectively only two dominant platforms: the platform of the Arab Socialist Ba'ath Party, which he described as notorious for corruption and widely unpopular, and the religious platform, which he noted had a pervasive presence throughout the country.

In a televised interview on Rotana Channel in January 2014, Fayyad expressed his objection to labeling insurgents as "jihadists," arguing that the term "jihad" carries positive connotations, as it implies striving for improvement or reform. He noted that many of the individuals involved in the conflict had very low educational levels, according to his assessment. Fayyad recounted his personal experience with a young man from a village near the town of Jayroud. At the time, Fayyad, who worked with a charitable organization as a pharmaceutical manufacturing specialist, was providing assistance in the area. The young man, whom Fayad alleged was previously engaged in procuring, later became a field commander in the Al-Nusra Front despite being illiterate. Fayyad claimed he had attempted to rehabilitate the young man socially.

Fayyad further stated that Syrian society was suffering greatly due to what he described as a distorted form of jihad. He also alleged that he possessed the names of four individuals who were burned to death by members of the Al-Nusra Front at the Adra industrial bakery. Additionally, he asserted that Israel stood to benefit the most from the ongoing situation in Syria, remarking that no Israeli could have ever imagined the state of disarray the country had reached.

== Notes ==
- Some sources indicate that Fayyad was born in 1953.
