= Gavin Francis =

Scottish writer and physician (born 1975)

Gavin Francis FRSL (born 1975) is a Scottish physician and a writer on travel and medical matters. He was raised in Fife, Scotland, and now lives in Edinburgh as a general practitioner.

== Biography ==
Born in Fife in 1975, Francis studied medicine at the University of Edinburgh and joined the emergency department at the old Royal Edinburgh Hospital. Having qualified as a physician, Francis spent ten years travelling on all seven continents. Francis spent time working in India and Africa, made several trips to the Arctic, and is said to have crossed Eurasia and Australasia by motorcycle.

Francis was working at the Royal Hospital for Sick Children, Edinburgh when he decided to undertake a 15-month position as the resident doctor with the British Antarctic Survey. He arrived at the Halley Research Station in Antarctica via the RRS Ernest Shackleton, a supply ship, on Christmas Eve, 2002, after a two-month voyage.

== Writings ==
Francis's experiences eventually formed the basis for his second book, Empire Antarctica (2012); his first book, True North: Travels in Arctic Europe (2008), detailed his experiences travelling in Arctic Europe from Unst to Svalbard.

His Adventures in Human Being (2015) won the Saltire Society Literary Award for non-fiction and was a British Medical Association (BMA) book of the year. Empire Antarctica was a shortlisted finalist for a number of book awards in 2013, including the Ondaatje Prize and the Saltire Prize, but received its most notable honour in November 2013 at the Lennoxlove Book Festival when it was named the 2013 Scottish Mortgage Investment Trust's Scottish Book of the Year.

Francis has been contributing articles and reviews to The Guardian since 2010, the London Review of Books, and The New York Review of Books since 2013. In addition to book reviews, his contributions have occasionally consisted of prose ruminations on medical topics such as stethoscopes and the human brain, an approach that led to his being commissioned by the Wellcome Trust to produce a collection of essays in this style.

His 2020 book Island Dreams was "a simple but sincere cartography of my own obsession with the twinned but opposing allures of island and city, of isolation and connection", and included 90 maps. In 2021 he published Intensive Care: A GP, a Community & COVID-19 describing his work in Edinburgh and Orkney during the COVID-19 pandemic.

== Selected publications ==
=== Books ===
- True North: Travels in Arctic Europe (Polygon 2008, 2010) ISBN 978-1846971303
- Empire Antarctica: Ice, Silence & Emperor Penguins (Chatto & Windus 2012) ISBN 978-0099565963
- Adventures in Human Being (Profile Books 2015) ISBN 978-1781253410
- Shapeshifters: A Journey Through the Changing Human Body (Wellcome Collection 2018) ISBN 978-1781257739
- Island Dreams: Mapping an Obsession (Canongate Books, 2020) ISBN 9781786898180
- Intensive Care: A GP, a Community & COVID-19 (Wellcome Collection, 2021) ISBN 9781788167321
- The Unfragile Mind: Making Sense of Mental Health (Wellcome Collection, 2026) ISBN 9781800819757

=== Translations ===
- Empire Antarctica: Eis, Totenstille & Kaiserpinguine (DuMont 2013) ISBN 978-3770182565, in German
- Island Dreams. Mapping an Obsession: Inseln. Die Kartierung einer Sehnsucht (DuMont 2020) ISBN 978-3832199890, in German

=== Articles ===
- Gavin Francis, "Changing Psychiatry's Mind" (review of Anne Harrington, Mind Fixers: Psychiatry's Troubled Search for the Biology of Mental Illness, Norton, 366 pp.; and Nathan Filer, This Book Will Change Your Mind about Mental Health: A Journey into the Heartland of Psychiatry, London, Faber and Faber, 248 pp.), The New York Review of Books, vol. LXVIII, no. 1 (14 January 2021), pp. 26–29. "[M]ental disorders are different [from illnesses addressed by other medical specialties].... To treat them as purely physical is to misunderstand their nature." "[C]are [needs to be] based on distress and [cognitive, emotional, and physical] need rather than [on psychiatric] diagnos[is]", which is often uncertain, erratic, and unreplicable. (p. 29.)
- Gavin Francis, "What Do You Expect?" (review of Kathryn T. Hall, Placebos, MIT Press, 2022; 201 pp; and Jeremy Howick, The Power of Placebos: How the Science of Placebos and Nocebose Can Improve Health Care, Johns Hopkins University Press, 2023; 304 pp.), The New York Review of Books, vol. LXXII, no. 11 (26 June 2025), pp. 30–32. "[O]ur culture has become so medicalized and reductionistic that warm and empathetic care, with its immense proven benefits for the way that a patient feels and heals, has been deprioritized to an optional extra rather than a core element of medicine. A rebalancing is in order: doctors need more time with their patients and, yes, more use of honest placebos – because they work." (p. 32.)

== Awards and honours ==
- 2013 Scottish Mortgage Investment Trust Book of the Year: Empire Antarctica
- 2013 Ondaatje Prize: Empire Antarctica (shortlist)
- 2013 Saltire Prize Book of the Year: Empire Antarctica (shortlist)
- 2013 Costa Book of the Year: Empire Antarctica (shortlist)
- 2013 Banff Mountain Book Competition: Empire Antarctica (shortlisted finalist)
- 2023 Fellow of the Royal Society of Literature
