= Helen Corke =

English writer and schoolteacher (1882–1978)

- Born: 1882; Hastings, East Sussex, England
- Died: 1978 (aged 95–96)
- Occupations: Writer, schoolteacher
- Writing career
- Notable works: D.H. Lawrence: the Croydon years Lawrence & Apocalypse

Helen Corke (1882–1978) was an English writer and schoolteacher. She wrote economic and political histories, poetry and several biographies of writer D. H. Lawrence, whom she was an intimate friend of while they both taught in Croydon.

== Life and career ==
Corke was born in Hastings to Congregationalist parents. Her father was a grocer.

She became acquainted with D. H. Lawrence in 1908 while they were both teaching in Croydon. When they met, Corke was grieving the suicide of Herbert Macartney, a married music teacher and violinist. Corke had spent a five-day holiday with Macartney on the Isle of Wight the previous summer. Two days after their return to London, Macartney killed himself.

In order to deal with her grief, Corke wrote an extensive diary of the experience. The name of the diary she wrote was The Freshwater Diary.

Corke didn't feel comfortable sharing her story with anyone, but Lawrence was different. She believed he could understand her grief and writing better than anyone else could. The diary served as the inspiration for Lawrence's second novel The Trespasser.

Lawrence believed that Corke should publish her work, so she did in 1933. She called this book Neutral Ground. She also helped Lawrence correct the proofs of The White Peacock.

She became a close friend of Lawrence's lover Jessie Chambers, the inspiration for the character of Miriam in Sons and Lovers, and later published a memoir about her entitled D.H. Lawrence's Princess. Well into her 90s, she wrote an autobiographical work In Our Infancy which won the 1975 Whitbread Award.

== Bibliography ==
=== Memoir ===
- Lawrence & Apocalypse (1933)
- D.H. Lawrence's 'Princess.' A Memory of Jessie Chambers (1951)
- D.H. Lawrence: the Croydon years (1965)
- Neutral Ground (1966)
- In Our Infancy : an Autobiography (1975)

=== Non-fiction ===
- The World's Family (1930)
- A Book of Ancient Peoples (1931)
- A Book of Modern Peoples (1933)
- Towards Economic Freedom : an Outline of World Economic History (1937)

=== Poetry ===
- Songs of Autumn, and Other Poems (1960)
