= Nabil Esmail =

Egyptian chemical engineer

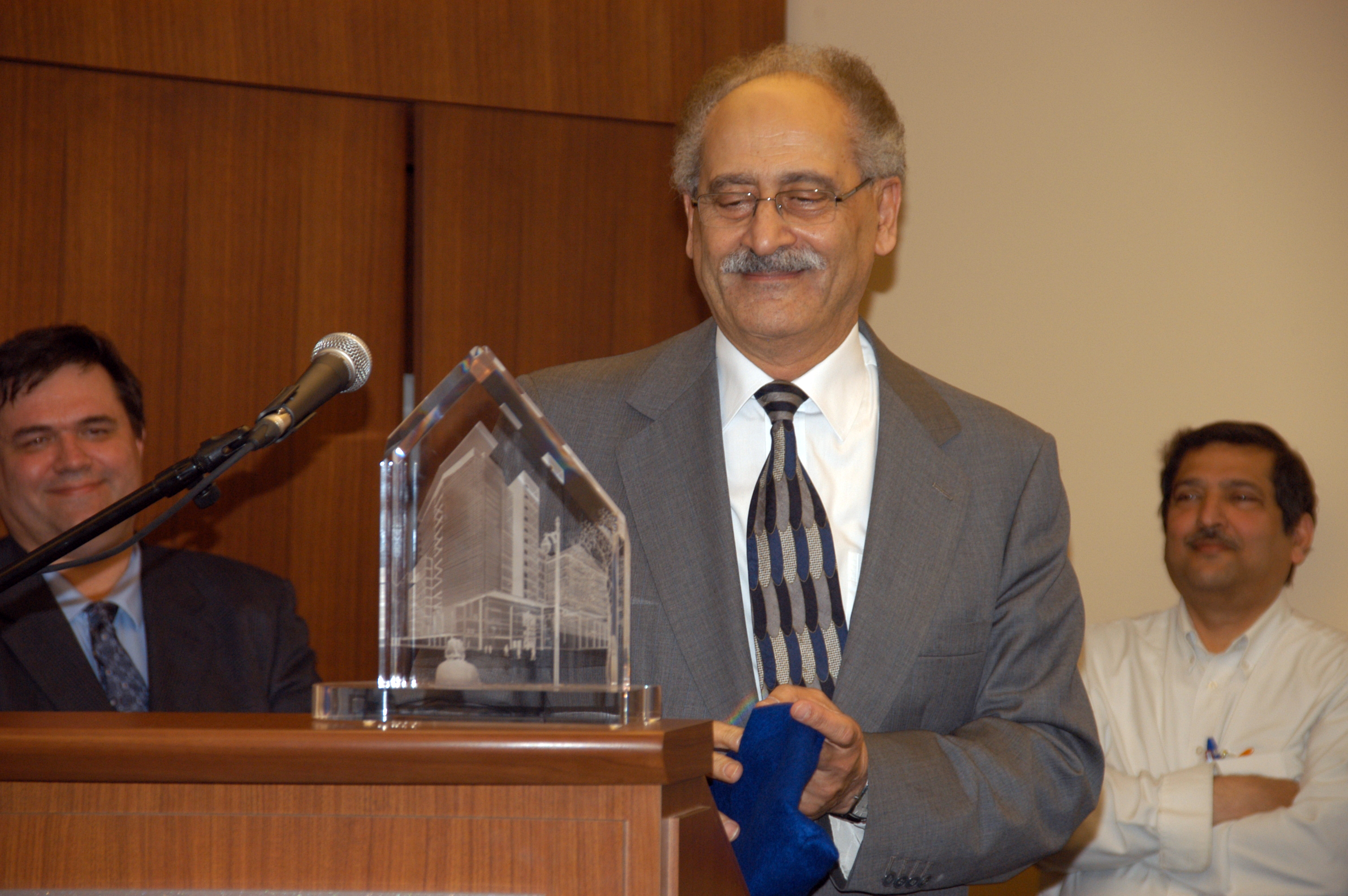
Nabil Esmail in 2008

Nabil Esmail (born 22 January 1942) is an Egyptian chemical engineer. He has been the dean of engineering at Concordia University, the chair of the Chemical Engineering Department at the University of Saskatchewan, and the Professor of Chemical and Mechanical Engineering at Saskatchewan and Concordia Universities respectively.

== Biography ==
Esmail was born and raised in Port Said, Egypt. After finishing his secondary education in Egypt, he received his Bachelor's, Master's and Doctorate degrees from Lomonosov Moscow State University in 1972. His advisor was Victor Shkadov. After earning his PhD, he taught for some time in the University of Ein Shams and in the Military Technical College in Egypt. He then immigrated to Canada.

== Academic career ==
After his postdoctorate work in the University of Toronto, he was awarded a faculty position at Saskatchewan University in 1977, where he was the head of the Chemical Engineering Department until 1994, as well as a professor of chemical engineering until 1997.

In 1997 he was appointed as the dean of engineering at Concordia University, where he remained the dean until 2008. He has been

- The chairman of the Canadian Council of Deans of Engineering and Applied Science 2004-2005
- The chairman of the Grants Committee in the Research Council of Canada 1997-1998
- The chairman of board of directors of the Canadian Journal of Chemical Engineering 1990-1996

== Research and publications ==
He has supervised more than 13 PhD students and 11 master's degree students at the universities of McGill, Saskatchewan and Concordia. He authored 143 different publications, 82 of which are in refereed journals.

== Honors and awards ==
Esmail is a fellow of the Canadian Academy of Engineering, a fellow of the Canadian Institute of Engineering, a fellow of the Canadian Institute of Chemistry and a fellow of the Canadian Society of Mechanical Engineering. 13 April 2010 he was given the Canadian Society for Mechanical Engineering (CSME) Award for Teaching Excellence at Concordia University. 17 February 2011 the Asia Pacific Journal of Chemical Engineering published a special edition to honor Dr. Nabil Esmail [3].

== References and external links ==
- http://www.encs.concordia.ca/resources/faculty-and-staff-directory
- http://users.encs.concordia.ca/~peer/contactus.html
- http://onlinelibrary.wiley.com/doi/10.1002/apj.v6.1/issuetoc
