= Peter Wagner (social theorist) =

German social and political theorist (born 1956)

- Born: September 18, 1956 (age 69)

Academic work
- Discipline: Philosophy, history of the social sciences
- Main interests: Philosophy, social theory, politics, European history

Peter Wagner is a German social and political theorist. His research brings together social and political philosophy and theory with the comparative-historical sociology of modern societies in Europe, Latin America and southern Africa. He has done comparative research in the history of the social sciences and has contributed to debates about the so-called Axial Age, while his recent work has addressed questions of historical progress and social and political transformations. He is a former professor of Social and Political Theory at the European University Institute, Florence, and a former professor of Sociology at the University of Warwick. At present he is an ICREA research professor at the University of Barcelona. He was elected to the Academia Europaea in 2019.

Wagner has also held visiting positions at the Université de Paris VIII (2011); the Université Catholique de Louvain-la-Neuve (2009–10); University of Cape Town (2009–10); the University of Bergen (2001); the Ecole des hautes études en sciences sociales, Paris (1998; 2001); the University of California at Berkeley (1996; 1997); the Swedish Collegium for Advanced Study, Uppsala (Fall 1987, 1989–1990); the Institute for Advanced Study, Princeton (1990–91); and the Centre National de la Recherche Scientifique, Paris (1994), among others. He was principal investigator of the European Research Council-funded Advanced Grant project “Trajectories of modernity: comparing non-European and European varieties”, and the Project Leader of the HERA (Humanities in the European Research Area) Joint Research Programme "Uses of the Past" on the project "The debt: historicizing Europe's relations with the 'South'", with Axel Honneth, Simona Forti and Bo Stråth as principal investigators.

He was born on September 18, 1956.

== Selected publications ==
- Collective Action and Political Transformations: The Entangled Experiences in Brazil, South Africa and Europe. Edinburgh University Press: Edinburgh 2019.
- Progress: A Reconstruction. Polity: Cambridge 2015.
- The Greek Polis and the Invention of Democracy: A Politico-cultural Transformation and its Interpretations (contributing co-editor with Johann P. Arnason and Kurt Raaflaub). Wiley-Blackwell: Oxford 2013.
- Modernity: Understanding the Present. Polity: London 2012.
- Modernity as Experience and Interpretation: A New Sociology of Modernity. Polity: London 2008. ISBN 978-0-7456-4218-5
- Varieties of World-Making: Beyond Globalization (contributing co-editor with Nathalie Karagiannis). Liverpool: Liverpool University Press 2007.
- The languages of civil society (editor). Berghahn Books: New York/Oxford 2006. ISBN 1-84545-119-8
- Theorizing Modernity. Inescapability and Attainability in Social Theory. SAGE: London 2001. ISBN 978-0761951476
- A History and Theory of the Social Sciences: Not All That is Solid Melts into Air. SAGE: London 2001.
- Le travail et la nation (co-editor, 1999)
- A Sociology of Modernity: Liberty and Discipline. Routledge: London 1993. ISBN 9780415081863
- Der Raum des Gelehrten (with Heidrun Friese, 1993)
- Sozialwissenschaften und Staat. Frankreich, Italien, Deutschland 1870-1980 (1990)

== See also ==
- Modernity
