= Nebil Gahwagi =

Hungarian footballer

Personal information
- Full name: Nebil Gahwagi
- Date of birth: 20 August 1989 (age 37)
- Place of birth: Budapest, Hungary
- Height: 1.73 m (5 ft 8 in)
- Position: Midfielder

Team information
- Current team: Mórahalom VSE; UTC Szeged
- Number: 21

Youth career
- 2002–2007: Tisza Volán SC

Senior career*
Years	Team	Apps	(Gls)
2007–2008	Tisza Volán SC	13	(5)
2008–2009	Diósgyőri VTK	2	(0)
2009–2011	Lombard-Pápa TFC	5	(0)
2011–2012	KITE Szeged	12	(0)
2012–2013	Szeged 2011	26	(1)
2013–2014	Mórahalom VSE	11	(2)
- * Club domestic league appearances and goals as of 19 September 2009

Nebil Gahwagi (born 20 August 1989) is a Hungarian football player. In 2009, he collapsed during a training session. In 2014, he left Hungary for England due to work reasons.
