= Free (Ypi book) =

2021 memoir by Lea Ypi

Free: Coming of Age at the End of History
- First edition
- Author: Lea Ypi
- Publisher: Allen Lane
- Publication date: 28 October 2021
- Pages: 336
- ISBN: 978-0-241-48185-1

Free: Coming of Age at the End of History or Free: A Child and a Country at the End of History is a 2021 book by Lea Ypi published by Penguin Books. In the book, Ypi details her experience growing up before and after the fall of communism in Albania.

== Reception ==
Free was shortlisted for the 2021 Baillie Gifford Prize and the 2021 Costa Book Award for biography. In January 2022, BBC Radio 4 serialised the book in their Book of the Week series.

Free won the Ondaatje Prize, the Slightly Foxed First Biography Prize, the Lumo Skëndo Prize for the Best Work in Albanian Nonfiction, and the Ridenhour Book Prize for Truth Telling.

10,000 copies of the book were sold in November 2021.

Ed O'Loughlin praised Ypi's use of subtext in the work. A vocal minority of Albanian critics of the book have accused it of being communist apologia, an accusation that Ypi has denied, and the Guardian has described as “mistaken”.

== Translations ==
- Albanian: Të lirë. Të rritesh në fund të historisë. Translated by Lea Ypi. Botimet Dudaj. 2021. ISBN 9789994306565.
- Danish: Fri. at blive voksen ved historiens afslutning. Translated by Steffen Rayburn-Maarup. 2021. ISBN 9788793772519.
- Dutch: Vrij. Opgroeien aan het einde van de geschiedenis. Translated by Luud Dorresteyn. 2021. ISBN 9789403150017.
- Icelandic: Frjáls: Æska í skugga járntjaldsins. Translated by Íslenskar bækur, Ævisögur - þýddar. 2022. ISBN 9789979227243.
- Italian: Libera. Diventare grandi alla fine della storia. Translated by Elena Cantoni. Feltrinelli. 2022. ISBN 9788858847497.
- French: Enfin libre. Grandir quand tout s'écroule. Translated by Emmanuelle Aronson and Philippe Aronson. Seuil. 2022. ISBN 9782021467635.
- Polish: Wolna. Dzieciństwo i koniec świata w Albanii. Translated by Wydawnictwo Czarne. Wydawnictwo Czarne. 2022. ISBN 9788381915847.
- Portuguese: Livre. Virando adulta no fim da história. Translation by Pedro Maia Soares. Todavia. 2022. ISBN 9786556923574.
- Swedish: Fri. En uppväxt vid historiens slut. Translated by Amanda Svensson. Albert Bonniers Förlag. 2022. ISBN 9789100197469.
- Greek: Ελεύθερη. μεγαλώνοντας στο τέλος της ιστορίας. Translated by Antōnēs Kalokyrēs. Ekdoseis Patakē. 2022. ISBN 9786180703443.
- German: Frei. Erwachsenwerden am Ende der Geschichte. Translated by Eva Bonné. Surkamp. 2023. ISBN 9783518473245.
- Norwegian: Fri. En oppvekst ved historiens ende. Translated by Inger Sverreson Holmes. Gyldendal. 2023. ISBN 9788205574960.
- Chinese: 自由：在歷史盡頭長大成人. Translated by 賴盈滿. 時報文化出版. 2023. ISBN 9786263743694.
- Bosnian: Slobodna - Odrastanje na kraju historije. Translated by Senada Kreso. Buybook. 2023. ISBN 9789926310691.
- Czech: Svobodná: jak jsem dospívala na konci dějin. Translated by Ester Žantovska. Host. 2023. ISBN 9788027519460.
- Serbian: Slobodna. Odrastanje na kraju istorije. Translated by Ivan Janković. Geopolitika. 2023. ISBN 9788661454097.
- Spanish: Libre. El desafío de crecer en el fin de la historia. Translated by Cecilia Ceriani. Editorial Anagrama. 2023. ISBN 9788433904966.
- Turkish: Özgür - Her Sey Parcalanirken Büyümek. Translated by İlknur Özdemir. Yapi Kredi Yayinlari YKY. 2023. ISBN 9789750857539.
- Romanian: Liberă. Un copil și o țară la sfârșitul istoriei. Translated by Bertha Savu. PublishDrive. 2024. ISBN 9786069787564.
- Croatian: Slobodna: Odrastanje na kraju povijesti. Translated by Katarina Penđer. Naklada OceanMore. 2025. ISBN 9789533322094.
- Slovak: Slobodná: Dospievanie na konci dejín. Translated by Ivana Krekáňová. Absynt. 2025. ISBN 9788082035783.
