= Bloomsbury Ballerina =

2008 book by British author Judith Mackrell

Bloomsbury Ballerina: Lydia Lopokova, Imperial Dancer and Mrs John Maynard Keynes
- First edition
- Author: Judith Mackrell
- Language: English
- Published: London
- Publisher: Phoenix, Weidenfeld & Nicolson (2008)
- Publication date: 2008
- Publication place: United Kingdom
- Pages: 404
- ISBN: 9781780227085
- Dewey Decimal: 792.8028092

Bloomsbury Ballerina : Lydia Lopokova, Imperial Dancer and Mrs John Maynard Keynes is a 2008 book by British author Judith Mackrell, first published by the Orion Publishing Group, under the Phoenix imprint. The book was shortlisted for the 2008 Costa Book Awards.

== Synopsis ==
The book profiles the life of Lydia Lopokova, a Russian-born ballerina and subsequent wife of John Maynard Keynes. Bloomsbury Ballerina is a personalised history of both Lopokova and the Bloomsbury Group told through the remarkable life of one of its outsiders. The book details her relationship with Keynes, and how Lopokova fought to win over Keynes, even when he had gay lovers, eventually resulting in a marriage of "mainly monogamous and deeply felt love"

== Reception ==
In The Guardian Kathryn Hughes wrote that "Judith Mackrell...is brilliant at making the reader see why Lopokova matters" Alison Light, in the London Review of Books praised Bloomsbury Ballerina, writing "I found this biography entirely enjoyable. Mackrell captures the fizz of Lopokova’s personality, her loveability, and makes her come alive"
