= Nabil Husein =

Indonesian businessman (born 1994)

Nabil Husien
- نبيل حسين
- Born: Nabil Husien Said Amin Alrasydi; 4 June 1994 (age 31); Indonesia
- Occupations: Businessman; Founder and president of Borneo Samarinda; Member of the Indonesian House of Representatives from the NasDem Party Faction
- Parents: Said Amin Alrasydi (father); Firjani Abubakar Minabari (mother)

Nabil Husien Said Amin Alrasydi (Arabic: نبيل حسين سعيد امين الرشيدي; born 4 June 1994) commonly known as Nabil Husien is an Indonesian businessman from Samarinda, East Kalimantan. He is also a member of the Indonesian House of Representatives from the NasDem Party faction.

As Persisam Putra Samarinda crisis in 2014, with support by Pusamania (former Persisam Putra's supporters group), Nabil's establish a football club named Borneo F.C., by acquiring license of Perseba Super Bangkalan and officiate as its president.

== Personal life ==
Nabil is Indonesian of Yemeni descent. His father Said Amin, is former leader of East Kalimantan branch of Pemuda Pancasila organization.
