= Nabil Kochaji =

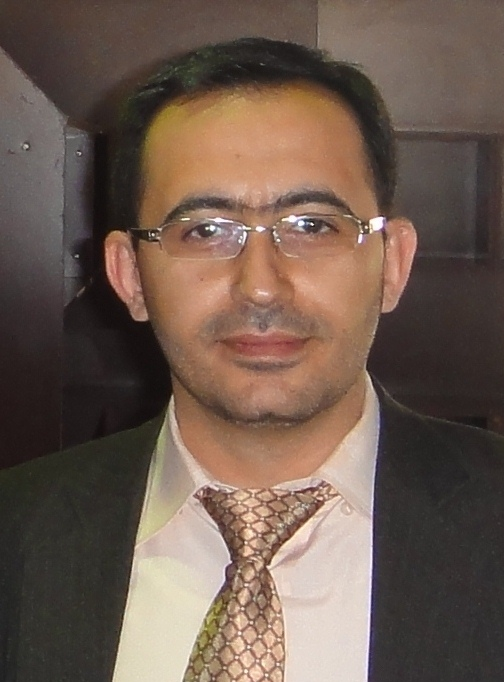
- Kochaji in 2015
- Born: Nabil Nader Kochaji; April 19, 1975 (age 50) Damascus, Syrian Arab Republic
- Occupation: Novelist; Short story writer; Researcher; Academic
- Period: 1975–present
- Genre: science fiction; medical research
- Notable awards: Senior Robert-Frank award holder

Nabil Kochaji (born April 19, 1975) is a Syrian author, novelist, medical researcher and academic.

== Education and career ==
Nabil started his career as a dentist after graduating in 1997 from the faculty of dentistry in the Damascus University. After graduation, he pursued a masters in medical and pharmaceutical research from the Vrije Universiteit Brussel (VUB), Faculteit van de Geneeskude en Farmacie before finally achieving a PhD in Dental sciences at the same University in 2005. He is currently a full professor at the faculty of Dentistry in the Damascus University. In the academic year of 2016–2017, he was assigned to the position of Founding Dean, Faculty of Dentistry at Al-Sham Private University.

He was awarded Senior Robert-Frank award from the International Association for Dental Research (IADR), 2005, Title of abstract: the Possible role of Myoepithelial cells in Salivary glands Pathogenesis.

In September 2017, he was the first to describe the "Peri-Implant Cyst" in his article: Inflammatory odontogenic cyst on an osseointegrated implant: A peri-implant cyst? New entity proposed, published in Dental and Medical Problems 54(3):303–306.

== Medical works ==
- Clinical Oral Pathology, Kochaji`s Guide to Oral Lesions and Biopsies (2024) Springer publishers

== Literary works ==
- A Journey to Mars (2014) (Arabic Rehla ela al Mareekh رحلة الى المريخ ) Available in dual language
- I Know Who Killed Me (2016) (Arabic Ana A`rifo Man Katalani أنا أعرف من قتلني)
- Silicon Valley (2019) (Arabic wadi al-silicon وادي السيلكون)

== Translations ==
Aside from his medical research, Kochaji has translated some medical texts through ELSEVIER publishers, including:

- Ten Cate's Oral Histology
- Forensic Dental Evidence second edition (Bilingual Book, English- Arabic)
- Cawson's Essentials of Oral Pathology and Medicine
- Forensic Dental Evidence
