= Simona Forti =

Italian philosopher and academic

Simona Forti is an Italian philosopher and academic, whose main interests are in political philosophy and contemporary ethics. She was born in Modena in 1958. She graduated in philosophy from the University of Bologna in 1983. In the following years she attended the Phd courses in political theory at the Turin University as well as the Phd courses in political philosophy at The New School in New York. She received her PhD in History of Political Thought from Turin University in 1989. In 2004 she was appointed Full Professor of History of Political Philosophy at the University of Eastern Piedmont. In 2020, she was appointed Full Professor of Political Philosophy at the Scuola Normale Superiore, in Pisa, Italy. She is one of the founding members of FINO”, a PhD Program in Philosophy coordinated by the Northwestern Italian University Consortium, and the standing president of Bios, an international and interdisciplinary research center on biopolitics and bioethics based at the University of Piemonte Orientale.

== Research interests ==
Simona Forti is widely recognized in Italy and aboard for her far-reaching studies on Hannah Arendt’s thought and the philosophical idea of Totalitarianism. In recent years she has given important contributions to the debate on [biopolitics] launched by Michel Foucault, by focusing on Nazi biopolitics of the souls and democratic biopolitics of the bodies. In her last volume, "New Demons: Rethinking Power and Evil Today," translated into English and published by Stanford University Press in 2015, she deals with the contemporary reshaping of the notion of Evil. In the Notre Dame Philosophical Reviews, Brad Evans (University of Bath) began his review of the book by stating, "Simona Forti's book is a sophisticated and theoretically rich text, which demands wide readership." Forti offers a new and inspiring genealogy of the relationship between evil and power, contending that evil must be explored in tandem with the passive attitude towards rule-following, the need for normalcy and recognition, the desire to stay alive at all costs, and the desire for obedience nurtured by our contemporary mass democracies.

From 2003 to 2011 Simona Forti was elected as member of the jury for “Der Hannah-Arendt Preis für politischen Denken” at the Heinrich Böll Foundation in Bremen and Berlin. From 2004 to 2007 she served as the Italian member of the Coordinating “International Committee of the European Science Foundation Network Activity on "The Politics and History of European Democratization" (PHED) for the European Science Foundation.

She has held visiting appointments at many European and American universities. In 2016–2017 as well as in 2011–2012, held lessons and seminars at The New School for Social Research in New York, an institution which has actively contributed to spread the European philosophical tradition known as Continental philosophy in the US. Moreover, during the spring semester 2013–14 she has been awarded a “Fulbright Distinguished Chair” at Northwestern University, (Evanston, Il).

== Selected works ==
The New Demons. Rethinking evil and power today, Stanford University Press, Stanford 2015, reviewed by A. Cavarero, Political Theory, XLV, 2017, n. 3, pp. 430–444: https://urlsand.esvalabs.com/?u=http%3A%2F%2Fjournals.sagepub.com%2Fdoi%2Ffull%2F10.1177%2F0090591716640470&e=5f74b327&h=2857395f&f=n;

Totalitarianism. Historical Regime or Bio-Power Intimate Vocation?, Public Seminar at The New School for Social Research: http://www.publicseminar.org/2017/02/totalitarianism/#.WS6YFBMT6u5;

Philosophy and Nazism, conference at the London School of Economics: https://urlsand.esvalabs.com/?u=http%3A%2F%2Fwww.lse.ac.uk%2Fwebsite-archive%2FnewsAndMedia%2FvideoAndAudio%2Fchannels%2FpublicLecturesAndEvents%2Fplayer.aspx%3Fid%3D3793&e=5f74b327&h=95604fda&f=n;

"The Soul as Site of Dissidence", in F. Tava and D. Meacham (eds), Thinking After Europe. Jan Patocka and Politics, Washington, Rowman & Littlefield, 2016;

Totalitarismo, Filosofia y Biopolitica, Estudios Publicos, 2016, n. 142, pp. 129–150;

H. Arendt, Karl Marx e la tradizione del pensiero politico occidentale, ed, by S. Forti, Milano, Cortina, 2016;

"Hannah Arendt lettrice di Karl Marx", in H. Arendt, Karl Marx e la tradizione del pensiero politico occidentale', Milano, Cortina, 2016;

Corpi (bio)-politicamente corretti, in L. Bazzicalupo e S. Vaccaro (eds.), Vita, politica, contingenza, Macerata, Quodlibet, 2016;

Vecchi e nuovi romantici, Iride", XXVIII, 2015, n.1;

H. Arendt, Socrate, ed. by I. Possenti, with essays by S. Forti and A. Cavarero, Milano, Cortina, 2015;

"Letture socratiche: Arendt, Foucault, Patocka", in H. Arendt, Socrate, a cura di I. Possenti, Milano, Cortina, 2015;

Parrhesia between East and West: Foucault and Dissidence, in V. Lemm, M. Vatter (ed.), The Government of Life. Foucault, Biopolitics and Neoliberalism, Fordham University Press, New York 2014;

I Nuovi demoni. Pensare oggi male e potere, Feltrinelli, Milano 2012; trad. spagnola Los Nuevos Demonios. Repensar hoy el mal y el poder, Edhasa, Buenos Aires 2014;

Corpi democratici, politicamente corretti, in G. Zagrebelsky (ed.), Le ragioni dei molti e il potere dei pochi, Einaudi, Torino 2011;

La vita e le sue qualità ai tempi del biopotere, Filosofia politica, XXIII, n. 3, 2009;

Spectres of Totality, in K. Palonen, T. Pulkkinen, J.M. Rosales (eds.), The Ashgate Research Companion to the Politics of Democratization in Europe, Ashgate Publishing Company, Farnham 2008;

"El Totalitarismo: Trayectoria de una idea limite", Herder Editorial, Barcelona 2008;

Il Grande corpo della totalità.Immagini e concetti per pensare il totalitarismo, in M. Recalcati (ed.), Forme contemporanee del totalitarismo, Torino, Bollati Boringhieri, 2007;

Paranoia e politica, (con Marco Revelli), Bollati Boringhieri, Torino 2007;

The Biopolitics of Souls. Racism, Nazism and Plato, Political Theory, XXXIV, n.1, 2006;

Rinforzare la specie. Il corpo femminile tra biopolitica e religione materna (con Olivia Guaraldo), Filosofia politica, XX, 2006, n. 1;

Hegel, Marx and Arendt, in Hannah Arendt: Critical Assessments of Leading Political Philosophers, ed. by G. Williams, Routledge, London 2006;

Hannah Arendt's Legacy at 100 Years of Her Birth, Revista de Ciencia Politica, XXVI, n. 2, 2006;

Hannah Arendt tra filosofia e politica, Mondadori, Milano 2006;

Edizione di H. Arendt, "Alcune questioni di filosofia morale", Einaudi, Torino 2006;

La filosofia di fronte all'estremo, Einaudi, Torino 2004;

Edition of and introduction to Archivio Arendt II 1950-1954, Feltrinelli, Milano 2003, 2005;

Edition of Archivio Arendt 1, 1930–1948; Feltrinelli, Milano 2001;

Il totalitarismo, Laterza, Roma-Bari, 2001, 2003, 2005;

Vida del espìritu y tiempo de la polis. Hannah Arendt entre filosofìa y politica, Ediciones Càtedra, Madrid 2001.
