= The Moth and the Mountain =

2020 book by Ed Caesar

The Moth and the Mountain: A True Story of Love, War, and Everest
- Author: Ed Caesar
- Language: English
- Subject: Maurice Wilson
- Publisher: Avid Reader Press
- Publication date: November 17, 2020
- Pages: 288
- ISBN: 978-1-5011-4337-3

The Moth and the Mountain: A True Story of Love, War, and Everest is a 2020 book by Ed Caesar that examines Maurice Wilson.

== Reception ==
The Guardian's Sam Wollaston, called Caesar's account "compelling, colourful and warm". Dan Richards, in Literary Review, praised the author for "managing to tell this tale so well".
