= Nabil Ennasri =

French writer

- Born: February 13, 1982 (age 44); Laval, France
- Education: Doctorate in Political Science from the Institute of Political Studies (IEP) in Aix-en-Provence
- Occupations: Writer, activist, specialist in the geopolitics of Islam and the Middle East

Nabil Ennasri is a French writer, association actor and specialist in the geopolitics of Islam and the Middle East (particularly the countries of the Arab-Persian Gulf).

== Early life and education ==
He was born and raised in Laval. He studied political science at the Institute of Political Studies (IEP) in Aix-en-Provence, where he obtained a doctorate on Qatar's foreign policy.

Ennasri is a political scientist and researcher specializing in Islamist movements. As part of the World Cup in Qatar organized in November–December 2022, he is asked by several French and foreign media to deliver his critical expertise on the event and its repercussions for the organizing country.

From 2008 to 2010, he studied Muslim theology at the European Institute of Human Sciences in Château-Chinon. According to the Liberation newspaper, in a 2013 article, Nabil Ennasri "is above all a Muslim Brotherhood, a disciple of Yusuf al-Qaradawi". However, in a 2017 article, the same newspaper Liberation reports a distance taken by Nabil Ennasri with Tariq Ramadan, grandson of the founder of the Muslim Brotherhood, recorded since 2014. The political scientist has since been invited by the same newspaper Liberation as "Qatar Specialist" (April 17–18, 2021 issue, page 3).

== Qatar specialist ==
In March 2013, he published with IRIS (Institute for International and Strategic Research) L'énigme du Qatar. This essay, prefaced by the geopolitical scientist Pascal Boniface, is part of a series of essays devoted to the small emirate and written by journalists and academics whose review Cairn has made several reviews.

In October 2013, he published another book entitled Qatar (Editions De Boeck), which is a booklet presenting the country.

In November 2017, he became a doctor in political science after having defended a doctoral thesis on the religious diplomacy of Qatar within the IEP of Aix-en-Provence. The jury, made up of academics specializing in the Gulf countries (such as Stéphane Lacroix) is chaired by Baudouin Dupret, whose academic research focuses on Islamic law.

In October 2022, he published a book "The Empire of Qatar, the new master of the game?" co-written with Raphaël Le Magoariec, doctoral student in geopolitics at the University of Tours. In a column in the Journal du Dimanche, they denounce the calls for a boycott of the 2022 World Cup in Qatar while supporting the approach of human rights NGOs such as Amnesty International to make this world a lever to wrest more rights. benefits for workers employed in the Gulf emirate.

== Commitment to ecology ==
Involved in the French associative fabric since his post-baccalaureate studies, Nabil Ennasri is also committed to the theme of ecology and awareness of the environmental cause. Alongside certain specialists such as Hervé Kempf, and through various colloquiums, forums, and conferences since 2011 he has held a discourse of accountability and a call to action around what he calls the "duty to environmental solidarity". He also makes it a major theme of his book entitled "Les 7 Défis capitals" published in 2014, which earned him an invitation to the program "Les grandes questions" broadcast on France 5 and presented by Franz-Olivier Giesbert.

== Publications ==
He publishes two self-published books:

- Les 7 Défis capitaux
- Et maintenant que fait-on ?
