= Nabeel Yasin =

Iraqi poet, journalist and political activist (born 1950)

- نبيل ياسين
- Born: 18 March 1950 (age 76); Baghdad, Iraq
- Education: University of Baghdad
- Occupations: Poet; journalist; political activist

Nabeel Yasin (Note: Arabic: نبيل ياسين, romanized: Nabīl Yāsīn) (born 18 March 1950) is an Iraqi poet, journalist and political activist.

== Biography ==
Nabeel Yasin was born on 18 March 1950 in the Karradat Merriam district of Baghdad. He studied Arabic Literature at the University of Baghdad, graduating in 1971. He wrote poetry from an early age and took part in poetry festivals at the university, as well as in national festivals in Basra and Nineveh.

Yasin began his career in journalism in 1966, and worked for national newspapers such as al-Thuwra and al-Jumhuria. He was also editor of the children’s weekly Mejelitee-wal-Mismar and the magazine Alif-Ba. In 1976, under pressure from the regime of dictator Saddam Hussein, Yasin was forced to give up his official journalistic posts, although he continued to write for an opposition paper until 1979 when the regime cracked down harder. In January 1980, fearing for his life, he left Iraq with his wife and child, arriving in Hungary.

Yasin completed his PhD in philosophy at the Hungarian Academy of Sciences in 1987. Both in Hungary and later in the UK, he was a prominent figure in the Iraqi opposition movement in exile, appearing often in print and electronic media. The Saddam regime was toppled by the American invasion in early 2003. Yasin returned to Iraq for the first time in 2007, after spending 27 years in exile.

Prior to the parliamentary elections in March 2010, Yasin set up a secular political party called Justice & Freedom: Renew Iraq. He ran unsuccessfully for the position of prime minister, which was eventually retained by Nouri al-Maliki.

More recently, Nabeel and his eldest son Yamam Nabeel have been running a non-profit organization called FC Unity which aims to further development and education through football matches and tournaments. FC Unity have so far held events in Iraq, England, Ghana and Sudan.

== Poetry ==
Yasin published his first book of poetry in 1969. The Saddam regime prevented the publication of his second book for two years, eventually allowing it to appear in censored form in 1975. His poems written in exile - for example, his best known work The Brothers Yasin - was banned in Iraq and circulated in Baghdad's literary underground via photocopies. His poetry has been translated into a number of languages, including English, French, Italian and Hungarian.

=== Selected works ===
- El Bukak ala Meselt el Ahzhan (Crying on the Obelisk of Sorrow; poetry; 1969)
- El Shu'araa Yehjoon el Mulook (The Poets Satirise the Kings; poetry; 1975)
- El Okhwa Yasin (The Brothers Yasin; poetry; 1994)
- Menaha ala Bilad el-Rafidayn (Lamenting Mesopotamia; poetry; 1996)
- El Tireekh el Muharam (The Forbidden History; essay on Arab political thought; 1998)
- El Shia wel Dowla (The Shi'ites and the State; 2008)

== In popular culture ==
In 2006, the British writer Jo Tatchell published a book-length account of Yasin's life under the title Nabeel's Song (U.S. edition: The Poet of Baghdad). The book was nominated for the Costa Biography Award, the Index on Censorship Award, and the Samuel Johnson Prize for Non-Fiction.

A documentary on Yasin entitled The Poet of Baghdad was filmed by director Georgie Weedon and broadcast on Al Jazeera English in 2009.

== Personal life ==
Yasin is married to Nada, and has two sons, Yamam and Hanin.
