= Costa Book Award for Children's Book =

Annual literary award for debut novels

The Costa Book Award for Children's Book, formerly known as the Whitbread Award (1971–2005), was an annual literary award for children's books, part of the Costa Book Awards, which were discontinued in 2022, the 2021 awards being the last made.

== Recipients ==
Costa Book Award for Children's Book winners and finalists
Year	Author	Title	Result	Ref.
1972	Rumer Godden	The Diddakoi	Winner	
1973	Alan Aldridge and William Plomer	The Butterfly Ball and the Grasshopper's Feast	Winner	
1974	Russell Hoban and Quentin Blake	How Tom Beat Captain Najork and His Hired Sportsmen	Winner	
1974	Jill Paton Walsh	The Emperor's Winding Sheet	Winner	
1975	No award presented in 1975			
1976	Penelope Lively	A Stitch in Time	Winner	
1977	Shelagh Macdonald	No End to Yesterday	Winner	
1978	Philippa Pearce	The Battle of Bubble & Squeak	Winner	
1979	Peter Dickinson	Tulku	Winner	
1980	Leon Garfield	John Diamond	Winner	
1981	Jane Gardam	The Hollow Land	Winner	
1982	W. J. Corbett	The Song of Pentecost	Winner	
1983	Roald Dahl	The Witches	Winner	
1984	Barbara Willard	The Queen of the Pharisees' Children	Winner	
1985	Janni Howker	The Nature of the Beast	Winner	
1986	Andrew Taylor	The Coal House	Winner	
1987	Geraldine McCaughrean	A Little Lower than the Angels	Winner	
1988	Judy Allen	Awaiting Developments	Winner	
1989	Hugh Scott	Why Weeps the Brogan	Winner	
1990	Peter Dickinson	AK	Winner	
1991	Diana Hendry	Harvey Angell	Winner	
1992	Gillian Cross	The Great Elephant Chase	Winner	
1993	Anne Fine	Flour Babies	Winner	
1994	Geraldine McCaughrean	Gold Dust	Winner	
1995	Michael Morpurgo	The Wreck of the Zanzibar	Winner	
1995	Elizabeth Arnold	The Parsley Parcel	Shortlist	
1995	Philip Ridley	Kasper in the Glitter	Shortlist	
1996	Anne Fine	The Tulip Touch	Winner	
1996	Russell Hoban	The Trokeville Way	Shortlist	
1996	Geraldine McCaughrean	Plundering Paradise	Shortlist	
1996	Philip Pullman	Clockwork or All Wound Up	Shortlist	
1997	Andrew Norriss	Aquila	Winner	
1997	Alan Temperley	Harry and the Wrinklies	Shortlist	
1997	Sharon Creech	Chasing Redbird	Shortlist	
1997	Melvin Burgess	Junk	Shortlist	
1998	David Almond	Skellig	Winner	
1998	Robert Swindells	Abomination	Shortlist	
1998	J. K. Rowling	Harry Potter and the Chamber of Secrets	Shortlist	
1998	James Riordan	Sweet Clarinet	Shortlist	
1999	J.K. Rowling	Harry Potter and the Prisoner of Azkaban	Winner	
1999	Carol Ann Duffy	Meeting Midnight	Shortlist	
1999	Michael Morpurgo	Kensuke's Kingdom	Shortlist	
1999	Jacqueline Wilson	The Illustrated Mum	Shortlist	
2000	Jamila Gavin	Coram Boy	Winner	
2000	David Almond	Heaven Eyes	Shortlist	
2000	Kevin Crossley-Holland	The Seeing Stone	Shortlist	
2000	Adéle Geras	Troy	Shortlist	
2001	Philip Pullman	The Amber Spyglass	Winner	
2001	Eoin Colfer	Artemis Fowl	Shortlist	
2001	Eva Ibbotson	Journey to the River Sea	Shortlist	
2001	Terry Jones	The Lady and the Squire	Shortlist	
2002	Hilary McKay	Saffy's Angel	Winner	
2002	Julie Bertagna	Exodus	Shortlist	
2002	Celia Rees	Sorceress	Shortlist	
2002	Philip Reeve	Mortal Engines	Shortlist	
2003	David Almond	The Fire-Eaters	Winner	
2003	Catherine Fisher	The Oracle	Shortlist	
2003	Michael Morpurgo	Private Peaceful	Shortlist	
2003	Jeanne Willis	Naked Without a Hat	Shortlist	
2004	Geraldine McCaughrean	Not the End of the World	Winner	
2004	Anne Cassidy	Looking for JJ	Shortlist	
2004	Meg Rosoff	How I Live Now	Shortlist	
2004	Ann Turnbull	No Shame, No Fear	Shortlist	
2005	Kate Thompson	The New Policeman	Winner	
2005	Frank Cottrell Boyce	Framed	Shortlist	
2005	Geraldine McCaughrean	The White Darkness	Shortlist	
2005	Hilary McKay	Permanent Rose	Shortlist	
2006	Linda Newbery	Set in Stone	Winner	
2006	David Almond	Clay	Shortlist	
2006	Julia Golding	The Diamond of Drury Lane	Shortlist	
2006	Meg Rosoff	Just in Case	Shortlist	
2007	Ann Kelley	The Bower Bird	Winner	
2007	Elizabeth Laird	Crusade	Shortlist	
2007	Meg Rosoff	What I Was	Shortlist	
2007	Marcus Sedgwick	Blood Red Snow White	Shortlist	
2008	Michelle Magorian	Just Henry	Winner	
2008	Keith Gray	Ostrich Boys	Shortlist	
2008	Saci Lloyd	The Carbon Diaries: 2015	Shortlist	
2008	Jenny Valentine	Broken Soup	Shortlist	
2009	Patrick Ness	The Ask and the Answer	Winner	
2009	Siobhan Dowd	Solace of the Road	Shortlist	
2009	Mary Hoffman	Troubadour	Shortlist	
2009	Anna Perera	Guantanamo Boy	Shortlist	
2010	Jason Wallace	Out of Shadows	Winner	
2010	Lucy Christopher	Flyaway	Shortlist	
2010	Sharon Dogar	Annexed	Shortlist	
2010	Jonathan Stroud	Bartimaeus: The Ring of Solomon	Shortlist	
2011	Moira Young	Blood Red Road	Winner	
2011	Martyn Bedford	Flip	Shortlist	
2011	Frank Cottrell Boyce	The Unforgotten Coat	Shortlist	
2011	Lissa Evans	Small Change for Stuart	Shortlist	
2012	Sally Gardner	Maggot Moon	Winner	
2012	Diana Hendry	The Seeing	Shortlist	
2012	Hayley Long	What’s Up with Jody Barton?	Shortlist	
2012	Dave Shelton	A Boy and a Bear in a Boat	Shortlist	
2013	Chris Riddell	Goth Girl and the Ghost of a Mouse	Winner	
2013	Ross Montgomery	Alex, the Dog and the Unopenable Door	Shortlist	
2013	Sarah Naughton	The Hanged Man Rises	Shortlist	
2013	Elizabeth Wein	Rose Under Fire	Shortlist	
2014	Kate Saunders	Five Children on the Western Front	Winner	
2014	Simon Mason	Running Girl	Shortlist	
2014	Michael Morpurgo	Listen to the Moon	Shortlist	
2014	Marcus Sedgwick	The Ghosts of Heaven	Shortlist	
2015	Frances Hardinge	The Lie Tree	Winner	
2015	Hayley Long	Sophie Someone	Shortlist	
2015	Sally Nicholls	An Island of Our Own	Shortlist	
2015	Andrew Norriss	Jessica's Ghost	Shortlist	
2016	Brian Conaghan	The Bombs That Brought Us Together	Winner	
2016	Ross Welford	Time Travelling With a Hamster	Shortlist	
2016	Francesca Simon	The Monstrous Child	Shortlist	
2017	Katherine Rundell	The Explorer	Winner	
2017	Sarah Crossan	Moonrise	Shortlist	
2017	Lissa Evans	Wed Wabbit	Shortlist	
2017	Millwood Hargrave	The Island at the End of Everything	Shortlist	
2017	Katherine Rundell	The Explorers	Shortlist	
2018	Hilary McKay	The Skylarks' War	Winner	
2018	David Almond	The Colour of the Sun	Shortlist	
2018	Candy Gourlay	Bone Talk	Shortlist	
2018	Matt Killeen	Orphan Monster Spy	Shortlist	
2019	Jasbinder Bilan	Asha & the Spirit Bird	Winner	
2019	Malorie Blackman	Crossfire	Shortlist	
2019	Nicholas Bowling	In the Shadow of Heroes	Shortlist	
2019	Jenny Downham	Furious Thing	Shortlist	
2020	Natasha Farrant	Voyage of the Sparrowhawk	Winner	
2020	Darren Charlton	Wranglestone	Shortlist	
2020	Jenny Pearson	The Super Miraculous Journey of Freddie Yates	Shortlist	
2020	Meg Rosoff	The Great Godden	Shortlist	
2021	Manjeet Mann	The Crossing	Winner	
2021	Anna Goodall	Maggie Blue and the Dark World	Shortlist	
2021	Ross Montgomery	The Midnight Guardians	Shortlist	
2021	Helen Rutter	The Boy Who Made Everyone Laugh	Shortlist	
