= Costa Book Award for Short Story =

Annual literary award

The Costa Book Award for Short Story, established in 2012, was an annual literary award for short stories, part of the Costa Book Awards.

The awards were dissolved in 2022.

== Recipients ==
Costa Books of the Year are distinguished with a bold font and a blue ribbon. Award winners are listed in bold.

Costa Book Award for Short Story winners and finalists
Year	Author	Short Story	Result	Ref.
2012	**Avril Joy**	**"Millie and Bird"**	**Winner**	
2012	Chioma Okereke	"Trompette de la Mort"	Runner up	
2012	Guy le Jeune	"Small Town Removal"	Runner up	
2012	Sheila Llewellyn	"Dislocation"	Shortlist	
2012	Angela Readman	"Don't Try this at Home"	Shortlist	
2012	Salley Vickers	"Mown Grass"	Shortlist	
2013	**Angela Readman**	**"The Keeper of the Jackalopes"**	**Winner**	
2013	Kit de Waal	"The Old Man and the Suit"	Second	
2013	Tony Bagley	"The Forgiveness Thing"	Third	
2013	Clare Chandler	"The Gun Shearer"	Shortlist	
2013	Sheila Llewellyn	"The Papakh Hat"	Shortlist	
2013	Erin Soros	"Still Water, BC"	Shortlist	
2014	**Zoe Gilbert**	**Fishskin, Hareskin**	**Winner**	
2014	Paula Cunningham	The Matchboy	Second	
2014	Joanne Meek	Jellyfish	Third	
2015	**Danny Murphy**	**Rogey**	**Winner**	
2015	Niall Bourke	Gerardo Dreams of Chillies	Finalist	
2015	Annalisa Crawford	Watching the Storms Roll In	Finalist	
2015	Peggy Riley	The Night Office	Finalist	
2015	Rupert Thomson	To William Burroughs, from His Wife	Finalist	
2015	Erin Soros	Fallen	Finalist	
2018	Caroline Ward Vine	Breathing Water	**Winner**	
2020	**Tessa Sheridan**	**"The Person Who Serves, Serves Again"**	**Winner**	
2020	Louise Dean	"How Adult Conversation Work	Second	
2020	Laura-Blaise McDowell	"The Lobster Waltz"	Third	

== See also ==
- Costa Book Award for Biography
- Costa Book Award for Children's Books
- Costa Book Award for First Novel
- Costa Book Award for Novel
- Costa Book Awards
