= United Kingdom Literacy Association =

The United Kingdom Literacy Association (UKLA) is a registered charity in the United Kingdom which aims to promote good practice and raise standards in literacy. It was founded in 1963 as the United Kingdom Reading Association, but changed its name in 2003. Wiley-Blackwell publishes a journal entitled Journal of Research in Reading on behalf of the UKLA.

The UKLA organizes the UKLA Book Awards for children's books. It is judged by teachers.

== UKLA Book Awards winners ==
=== 2026 ===
- 11 to 14+ category: Wolf Siren by Beth O'Brien
- 7 to 10+ category: Reek by Alastair Chisholm and George Caltsoudas
- 3 to 6+ category: Don't Think of Tigers by Alex Latimer
- Information Books category: Frog by Isabel Thomas and Daniel Egnéus

=== 2025 ===
- 11 to 14+ category: Glasgow Boys by Margaret McDonald
- 7 to 10+ category: Safiyaah's War by Hiba Noor Khan
- 3 to 6+ category: Gina Kaminski Saves the Wolf by Craig Barr-Green and Francis Martin
- Information Books category: Brilliant Black British History by Atinuke, illustrated by Kingsley Nebechi

=== 2024 ===
- 11 to 14+ category: Crossing the Line by Tia Fisher
- 7 to 10+ category: Wildsmith: Into the Dark Forest by Liz Flanagan, illustrated by Joe Todd-Stanton
- 3 to 6+ category: The Hare-Shaped Hole by John Dougherty, illustrated by Thomas Docherty
- Information Books category: The Boy Who Didn't Want to Die by Peter Lantos

=== 2023 ===
- 11 to 14+ category: The Crossing by Manjeet Mann
- 7 to 10+ category: The Light in Everything by Katya Balen
- 3 to 6+ category: Flooded by Mariajo Ilustrajo
- Information Books category: Musical Truth by Jeffrey Boakye, illustrated by Ngadi Smart

=== 2022 ===
- 11 to 14+ category: Punching the Air by Ibi Zoboi and Yusef Salaam
- 7 to 10 category: October, October by Katya Balen, illustrated by Angela Harding
- 3 to 6+ category: (joint winners)
  - Barbara Throws a Wobbler by Nadia Shireen
  - The Invisible by Tom Percival
- Information Books category: Nano by Dr Jess Wade, illustrated by Melissa Castrillón

=== 2021 ===
- 11 to 14+ category (joint winners)
  - Run Rebel by Manjeet Mann
  - The Last Paper Crane by Kerry Drewery, illustrated by Natsko Seki
- 7 to 10+ category: Check Mates by Stewart Foster
- 3 to 6+ category: Look Up! by Nathan Bryon and illustrator Dapo Adeola
- Information Books category: The Undefeated by Kwame Alexander, illustrated by Kadir Nelson

=== 2020 ===
- 11 to 14+ category: No Fixed Address by Susin Nielsen
- 7 to 11 category: The Eleventh Trade by Alyssa Hollingsworth
- 3 to 6 category: Mixed, written and illustrated by Arree Chung
- Information Books category: Counting on Katherine, written by Helaine Becker and illustrated by Dow Phumiruk

=== 2019 ===
- 12 to 16+ category: Long Way Down by Jason Reynolds, illustrated by Chris Priestley
- 7 to 11 category: The Explorer by Katherine Rundell, illustrated by Hannah Horn
- 3 to 6 category: I am Bat, written and illustrated by Morag Hood

=== 2018 ===
- 12 to 16+ category: We Come Apart by Sarah Crossan and Brian Conaghan
- 7 to 11 category (joint winners)
  - Welcome to Nowhere written by Elizabeth Laird and illustrated by Lucy Eldridge
  - Lesser Spotted Animals written and illustrated by Martin Brown
- 3 to 6 category: Colin and Lee Carrot and Pea written and illustrated by Morag Hood

=== 2017 ===
- 12 to 16+ category: The Reluctant Journal of Henry K. Larsen by Susin Nielsen
- 7 to 11 category: The Journey written and illustrated by Francesca Sanna
- 3 to 6 category: There's a Bear on MY Chair by Ross Collins

=== 2016 ===
- 12 to 16+ category: The Lie Tree by Frances Hardinge
- 7 to 11 category: The Imaginary by A. F. Harrold and Emily Gravett
- 3 to 6 category: Little Red and the Very Hungry Lion by Alex T. Smith

=== 2015 ===
- 12 to 16+ category: Every Day by David Levithan
- 7 to 11 category: Oliver and the Seawigs by Philip Reeve and Sarah McIntyre
- 3 to 6 category: The Day the Crayons Quit written by Drew Daywalt and illustrated by Oliver Jeffers

=== 2014 ===
- 12 to 16 category: Now is the Time for Running by Michael Williams
- 7 to 11 category: The Story of the Blue Planet by Andri Snær Magnason, Julian Meldon D'Arcy (translator), Áslaug Jónsdóttir (illustrator)
- 3 to 6 category: This is Not My Hat by Jon Klassen

=== 2013 ===
- 12 to 16 category: Code Name Verity by Elizabeth Wein
- 7 to 11 category: The Weight of Water by Sarah Crossan
- 3 to 6 category: Good Little Wolf by Nadia Shireen Rayner

=== 2012 ===
- 12 to 16 category: A Monster Calls by Patrick Ness, illustrated by Jim Kay
- 7 to 11 category: Sky Hawk by Gill Lewis
- 3 to 6 category: Iris & Isaac by Catherine Rayner

=== 2011 ===
- 12 to 16 category: Out of Shadows by Jason Wallace
- 3 to 11 category: Birdsong by Ellie Sandall

=== 2010 ===
- 12 to 16 category: The Graveyard Book by Neil Gaiman and Chris Riddell (illustrator)
- 3 to 11 category: Then by Morris Gleitzman

=== 2009 ===
- 12 to 16 category: Bog Child by Siobhan Dowd
- 3 to 11 category: Archie's War by Marcia Williams

=== 2008 ===
- Picture book category: Penguin by Polly Dunbar
- Novel category: Here Lies Arthur by Philip Reeve
