= Nick Newman =

Nick Newman may refer to:

- Nick Newman (naval architect) (1935-), an American naval architect
- Nick Newman (cartoonist) (1958-), a satirical British cartoonist and comedy scriptwriter
- Nick Newman, pen name of British speculative fiction author, Nicholas Bowling

== See also ==
- Nicholas Newman, a fictional character from the American CBS soap opera The Young and the Restless
- Nicholas Newman (athlete), a Paralympian athlete from Bloemfontein, South Africa
