= Costa Book Awards =

Former annual literary awards

- Awarded for: English-language books by writers based in the UK and the Republic of Ireland
- Country: United Kingdom and Republic of Ireland
- Presented by: Costa Coffee
- Formerly called: Whitbread Book Awards
- First award: 1971; 55 years ago
- Final award: 2021; 5 years ago
- Website: http://costabookawards.com

The Costa Book Awards were a set of annual literary awards recognising English-language books by writers based in UK and Ireland. Originally named the Whitbread Book Awards from 1971 to 2005 after its first sponsor, the Whitbread company, then a brewery and owner of pub-restaurant chains, it was renamed when Costa Coffee, then a subsidiary of Whitbread, took over sponsorship. The companion Costa Short Story Award was established in 2012. Costa Coffee was purchased by the Coca-Cola Company in 2018. The awards were discontinued in 2022.

The awards were given both for high literary merit and for works that were enjoyable reading, and their aim was to convey the enjoyment of reading to the widest possible audience. As such, they were considered a more populist literary prize than the Booker Prize, which also limited winners to literature written in the English language and published in the UK and Ireland.

Awards were separated into six categories: Biography, Children's Books, First Novel, Novel, Poetry, and Short Story.

In 1989, there was controversy when the judges first awarded the Best Novel prize to Alexander Stuart's The War Zone, then withdrew the prize prior to the ceremony amid acrimony among the judges, ultimately awarding it to Lindsay Clarke's The Chymical Wedding.

== History ==
The 1989 Whitbread Book Award for Best Novel was first awarded to The War Zone by Alexander Stuart. However, juror Jane Gardam felt the book was "repellent" and appealed directly to the Whitbread company, arguing that awarding the prize to Stuart's novel would make them into a "laughing stock". After ten days, and leaking the story to the press, the other two jurors, David Cook and Val Hennessy, were persuaded to change their minds, and Lindsay Clarke's The Chymical Wedding won the award instead. Both Cook and Hennessy found the experience so unpleasant they vowed to never sit in an award jury again.

The awards were discontinued in 2022, with the 2021 awards being the last ones made. Just one month later, the Blue Peter Book Award was also discontinued; this left only three widely recognized awards for UK children's literature (the Waterstones Children's Book Prize, the Carnegie Medal, and the Kate Greenaway Medal).

== Process ==
There were five book award categories. These had not been changed since the Poetry Award was introduced in 1985, although the children's category had been termed "children's novel" or "children's book of the year". The categories are:

- Novel
- First novel
- Children's book
- Poetry
- Biography

Each of the five winning writers received £5,000. The prize required a £5,000 fee from publishers if a book was to be shortlisted.

=== Short stories ===
The short story award was established in 2012 with a prize of £3,500 for the first, £1,000 for the second and £500 for the third. The winning story was determined by public vote from a shortlist of six that were selected by a panel of judges. The process was "blind" at both stages for the unpublished entries were anonymous until the conclusion.

In the inaugural year, the six short story finalists were exposed anonymously online while the public vote was underway, two months before the winner was to be announced.

== Winners ==
Bold font and blue ribbon distinguish the overall Costa/Whitbread Book of the Year.

For lists that include shortlisted entries (where available), please see:

- Costa Book Award for Novel
- Costa Book Award for First Novel
- Costa Book Award for Children's Book
- Costa Book Award for Poetry
- Costa Book Award for Biography
- Costa Book Award for Short Story

=== List of award winners ===
Year	Award						Notes & Refs
Year	Novel	First novel	Children's book	Poetry	Biography	Short story	Notes & Refs
1971	Gerda Charles; The Destiny Waltz	—	—	Geoffrey Hill; Mercian Hymns	Michael Meyer; Henrik Ibsen	—	
1972	Susan Hill; The Bird of Night	—	Rumer Godden; The Diddakoi	—	James Pope-Hennessy; Anthony Trollope	—	
1973	Shiva Naipaul; The Chip-Chip Gatherers	—	Alan Aldridge and William Plomer; The Butterfly Ball and the Grasshopper's Feast	—	John Wilson; CB: A Life of Sir Henry Campbell-Bannerman	—	
1974	Iris Murdoch; The Sacred and Profane Love Machine	Claire Tomalin; The Life and Death of Mary Wollstonecraft	Russell Hoban and Quentin Blake; How Tom Beat Captain Najork and His Hired Sportsmen; Jill Paton Walsh; The Emperor's Winding Sheet	—	Andrew Boyle; Poor Dear Brendan	—	
1975	William McIlvanney; Docherty	Ruth Spalding; The Improbable Puritan: A Life of Bulstrode Whitelocke	—	—	Helen Corke; In Our Infancy	—	
1976	William Trevor; The Children of Dynmouth	—	Penelope Lively; A Stitch in Time	—	Winifred Gerin; Elizabeth Gaskell	—	
1977	Beryl Bainbridge; Injury Time	—	Shelagh Macdonald; No End to Yesterday	—	Nigel Nicolson; Mary Curzon	—	
1978	Paul Theroux; Picture Palace	—	Philippa Pearce; The Battle of Bubble & Squeak	—	John Grigg; Lloyd George: The People's Champion	—	
1979	Jennifer Johnston; The Old Jest	—	Peter Dickinson; Tulku	—	Penelope Mortimer; About Time	—	
1980	David Lodge; How Far Can You Go	—	Leon Garfield; John Diamond	—	David Newsome; On the Edge of Paradise: A. C. Benson, Diarist	—	
1981	Maurice Leitch; Silver's City	William Boyd; A Good Man in Africa	Jane Gardam; The Hollow Land	—	Nigel Hamilton; Monty: The Making of a General	—	
1982	John Wain; Young Shoulders	Bruce Chatwin; On the Black Hill	W. J. Corbett; The Song of Pentecost	—	Edward Crankshaw; Bismarck	—	
1983	William Trevor; Fools of Fortune	John Fuller; Flying to Nowhere	Roald Dahl; The Witches	—	Victoria Glendinning; Vita; Kenneth Rose; King George V	—	
1984	Christopher Hope; Kruger's Alp	James Buchan; A Parish of Rich Women	Barbara Willard; The Queen of the Pharisees' Children	—	Peter Ackroyd; T. S. Eliot	Diane Rowe; Tomorrow is our Permanent Address	
1985	Peter Ackroyd; Hawksmoor	Jeanette Winterson; Oranges Are Not the Only Fruit	Janni Howker; The Nature of the Beast	Douglas Dunn; Elegies	Ben Pimlott; Hugh Dalton	—	
1986	Kazuo Ishiguro; An Artist of the Floating World	Jim Crace; Continent	Andrew Taylor; The Coal House	Peter Reading; Stet	Richard Mabey; Gilbert White	—	
1987	Ian McEwan; The Child in Time	Francis Wyndham; The Other Garden	Geraldine McCaughrean; A Little Lower than the Angels	Seamus Heaney; The Haw Lantern	Christopher Nolan; Under the Eye of the Clock	—	
1988	Salman Rushdie; The Satanic Verses	Paul Sayer; The Comforts of Madness	Judy Allen; Awaiting Developments	Peter Porter; The Automatic Oracle	A. N. Wilson; Tolstoy	—	
1989	Lindsay Clarke; The Chymical Wedding	James Hamilton-Paterson; Gerontius	Hugh Scott; Why Weeps the Brogan	Michael Donaghy; Shibboleth	Richard Holmes; Coleridge: Early Visions	—	
1990	Nicholas Mosley; Hopeful Monsters	Hanif Kureishi; The Buddha of Suburbia	Peter Dickinson; AK	Paul Durcan; Daddy, Daddy	Ann Thwaite; AA Milne – His Life	—	
1991	Jane Gardam; The Queen of the Tambourine	Gordon Burn; Alma Cogan	Diana Hendry; Harvey Angell	Michael Longley; Gorse Fires	John Richardson; A Life of Picasso	—	
1992	Alasdair Gray; Poor Things	Jeff Torrington; Swing Hammer Swing!	Gillian Cross; The Great Elephant Chase	Tony Harrison; The Gaze of the Gorgon	Victoria Glendinning; Trollope	—	
1993	Joan Brady; Theory of War	Rachel Cusk; Saving Agnes	Anne Fine; Flour Babies	Carol Ann Duffy; Mean Time	Andrew Motion; Philip Larkin: A Writer's Life	—	
1994	William Trevor; Felicia's Journey	Fred D'Aguiar; The Longest Memory	Geraldine McCaughrean; Gold Dust	James Fenton; Out of Danger	Brenda Maddox; D H Lawrence: The Married Man	—	
1995	Salman Rushdie; The Moor's Last Sigh	Kate Atkinson; Behind the Scenes at the Museum	Michael Morpurgo; The Wreck of the Zanzibar	Bernard O'Donoghue; Gunpowder	Roy Jenkins; Gladstone	—	
1996	Beryl Bainbridge; Every Man for Himself	John Lanchester; The Debt to Pleasure	Anne Fine; The Tulip Touch	Seamus Heaney; The Spirit Level	Diarmaid MacCulloch; Thomas Cranmer: A Life	—	
1997	Jim Crace; Quarantine	Pauline Melville; The Ventriloquist's Tale	Andrew Norriss; Aquila	Ted Hughes; Tales from Ovid	Graham Robb; Victor Hugo	—	
1998	Justin Cartwright; Leading the Cheers	Giles Foden; The Last King of Scotland	David Almond; Skellig	Ted Hughes; Birthday Letters	Amanda Foreman; Georgiana, Duchess of Devonshire	—	Posthumous Book of the Year Award
1999	Rose Tremain; Music and Silence	Tim Lott; White City Blue	J.K. Rowling; Harry Potter and the Prisoner of Azkaban	Seamus Heaney; Beowulf: A New Verse Translation	David Cairns; Berlioz Volume Two: Servitude and Greatness	—	
2000	Matthew Kneale; English Passengers	Zadie Smith; White Teeth	Jamila Gavin; Coram Boy	John Burnside; The Asylum Dance	Lorna Sage; Bad Blood – A Memoir	—	
2001	Patrick Neate; Twelve Bar Blues	Sid Smith; Something Like A House	Philip Pullman; The Amber Spyglass	Selima Hill; Bunny	Diana Souhami; Selkirk's Island	—	
2002	Michael Frayn; Spies	Norman Lebrecht; The Song of Names	Hilary McKay; Saffy's Angel	Paul Farley; The Ice Age	Claire Tomalin; Samuel Pepys: The Unequalled Self	—	
2003	Mark Haddon; The Curious Incident of the Dog in the Night-Time	DBC Pierre; Vernon God Little	David Almond; The Fire-Eaters	Don Paterson; Landing Light (poetry collection)	DJ Taylor; Orwell: The Life	—	
2004	Andrea Levy; Small Island	Susan Fletcher; Eve Green	Geraldine McCaughrean; Not the End of the World	Michael Symmons Roberts; Corpus	John Guy; My Heart Is My Own: The Life of Mary Queen of Scots	—	
2005	Ali Smith; The Accidental	Tash Aw; The Harmony Silk Factory	Kate Thompson; The New Policeman	Christopher Logue; Cold Calls	Hilary Spurling; Matisse the Master	—	
2006	William Boyd; Restless	Stef Penney; The Tenderness of Wolves	Linda Newbery; Set in Stone	John Haynes; Letter to Patience	Brian Thompson; Keeping Mum	—	
2007	A.L. Kennedy; Day	Catherine O'Flynn; What Was Lost	Ann Kelley; The Bower Bird	Jean Sprackland; Tilt	Simon Sebag Montefiore; Young Stalin	—	
2008	Sebastian Barry; The Secret Scripture	Sadie Jones; The Outcast	Michelle Magorian; Just Henry	Adam Foulds; The Broken Word	Diana Athill; Somewhere Towards the End	—	
2009	Colm Tóibin; Brooklyn	Raphael Selbourne; Beauty	Patrick Ness; The Ask and the Answer	Christopher Reid; A Scattering	Graham Farmelo; The Strangest Man: The Hidden Life of Paul Dirac, Quantum Genius	—	
2010	Maggie O'Farrell; The Hand That First Held Mine	Kishwar Desai; Witness the Night	Jason Wallace; Out of Shadows	Jo Shapcott; Of Mutability	Edmund de Waal; The Hare with Amber Eyes	—	
2011	Andrew Miller; Pure	Christie Watson; Tiny Sunbirds Far Away	Moira Young; Blood Red Road	Carol Ann Duffy; The Bees	Matthew Hollis; Now All Roads Lead to France: The Last Years of Edward Thomas	—	
2012	Hilary Mantel; Bring up the Bodies	Francesca Segal; The Innocents	Sally Gardner; Maggot Moon	Kathleen Jamie; The Overhaul	Mary Talbot and Bryan Talbot; Dotter of Her Father's Eyes	Avril Joy; Millie and Bird	
2013	Kate Atkinson; Life after Life	Nathan Filer; The Shock of the Fall	Chris Riddell; Goth Girl and the Ghost of a Mouse	Michael Symmons Roberts; Drysalter	Lucy Hughes-Hallett; The Pike	Angela Readman; The Keeper of the Jackalopes	
2014	Ali Smith; How to Be Both	Emma Healey; Elizabeth is Missing	Kate Saunders; Five Children on the Western Front	Jonathan Edwards; My Family and Other Superheroes	Helen Macdonald; H is for Hawk	Zoe Gilbert; Fishskin, Hareskin	
2015	Kate Atkinson; A God in Ruins	Andrew Michael Hurley; The Loney	Frances Hardinge; The Lie Tree	Don Paterson; 40 Sonnets	Andrea Wulf; The Invention of Nature	Danny Murphy; Rogey	
2016	Sebastian Barry; Days Without End	Francis Spufford; Golden Hill	Brian Conaghan; The Bombs That Brought Us Together	Alice Oswald; Falling Awake	Keggie Carew; Dadland: A Journey into Uncharted Territory	Jess Kidd; Dirty Little Fishes	
2017	Jon McGregor; Reservoir 13	Gail Honeyman; Eleanor Oliphant Is Completely Fine	Katherine Rundell; The Explorer	Helen Dunmore; Inside the Wave	Rebecca Stott; In the Days of Rain	—	Posthumous Book of the Year Award
2018	Sally Rooney; Normal People	Stuart Turton; The Seven Deaths of Evelyn Hardcastle	Hilary McKay; The Skylarks' War	J. O. Morgan; Assurances	Bart van Es; The Cut Out Girl: A Story of War and Family, Lost and Found	—	
2019	Jonathan Coe; Middle England	Sara Collins; The Confessions of Frannie Langton	Jasbinder Bilan; Asha & the Spirit Bird	Mary Jean Chan; Flèche	Jack Fairweather; The Volunteer	—	
2020	Monique Roffey; The Mermaid of Black Conch: A Love Story	Ingrid Persaud; Love After Love	Natasha Farrant; Voyage of the Sparrowhawk	Eavan Boland; The Historians	Lee Lawrence; The Louder I Will Sing	Tessa Sheridan; The Person Who Serves, Serves Again	
2021	Claire Fuller, Unsettled Ground	Caleb Azumah Nelson, Open Water	Manjeet Mann, The Crossing	Hannah Lowe, The Kids	John Preston, Fall: The Mystery of Robert Maxwell	—	
Year	Novel	First novel	Children's book	Poetry	Biography	Short story	Notes & Refs
"—" not awarded this year

== See also ==
- List of British literary awards
- List of Irish literary awards
- List of literary awards
- English literature
- Irish literature
- European literature
- British literature
- Literature
- List of years in literature
