= Pea's Book of Best Friends =

2012 novel by Susie Day

- Author: Susie Day
- Illustrator: Nick Sharratt
- Language: English
- Genre: Children's novel
- Publisher: Penguin Random House
- Publication date: 5 July 2012
- Publication place: United Kingdom
- Media type: Print (Ebook & paperback) and audiobook
- Pages: 288
- ISBN: 978-0141375328
- Followed by: Pea's Book of Big Dreams

Pea's Book of Best Friends is a 2012 children's novel written by Susie Day. The novel centres on Pea Llewellyn, who moves to London with her mother and two sisters, Clover and Tinkerbell, and her determination to make a new best friend. The novel was released in July 2012 as the first in Day's Pea series; Day later wrote three more novels in the series. Pea's Book of Best Friends also features the Paget-Skidelskys, a family with same-sex parents. Day wanted to encourage other authors and publishers to be more diverse in children's books regarding LGBTQ+ representation. Day later wrote a novel from the perspective of one of the characters from the family. The novel was well-received, with the characters being particularly praised, and it was longlisted for the 2014 United Kingdom Literacy Association Book Award. A new edition of the novel with a new cover was released in 2016.

== Plot ==
Pea Llewellyn and her family move from a small house in Tenby to a bigger house in London due to the success of Bree, Pea's single mother and a best-selling children's author of books about mermaids. Pea and her sisters Clover and Tinkerbell like having their own bedrooms but Pea misses her school friend Dot. She tries making friends at her new secondary school but no one wants to sit next to her, so she sets out to make a new best friend. She also befriends her neighbours, the Paget-Skidelskys, a female same-sex couple – a family therapist and an academic – and their children, twins Sam One and Sam Two. Pea, Clover and Tinkerbell dislike life in London and begin planning to go back to Tenby. Later, Tinkerbell briefly goes missing but it is revealed that she was in the Paget-Skidelskys' house next door. Pea eventually comes to terms with her new life and she becomes close with one of the Sams, who becomes her boy best friend.

== Production ==
Pea's Book of Best Friends was written by author Susie Day. It is the first book in Day's Pea book series, and was followed by Pea's Book of Big Dreams, Pea's Book of Birthdays and Pea's Book of Holidays. Day revealed the cover of Pea's Book of Best Friends on her website in February 2012, when she was writing the second novel in the series; she dubbed the cover "Death by adorableness". It was published by Penguin Random House, and originally released in July 2012. A new edition of the novel with a new cover was released on 7 July 2016.

The novel features a family with same-sex parents: Pea's neighbours, the Paget-Skidelskys, consisting of two children both named Sam (Sam One and Sam Two) and their two mothers. Of this, Day wrote in The Guardian that publishers and writers needed to catch up regarding LGBTQ+ representation in literature, particularly with gay marriage being legalised; she explained, "My Pea's Book series includes a prominent set of same-sex parents, the Paget-Skidelskys next door. They aren't an issue, or a problem; they're a family, as daft and wise and funny as all the rest. This kind of casual inclusion is becoming more common in our post-Section 28 world but we need so much more for this age group: not only 'issue' books about bullying but genre fiction, non-fiction, comics; more books that are diverse in other ways too; more happy books." Day also said that she had a "stupid amount of fun writing" about the family. In July 2013, Day announced that she was writing a spin-off novel from the perspective of Sam One. The first novel, The Secrets of Sam and Sam, was released in 2015.

== Reception ==
Pea's Book of Best Friends was longlisted for the 2014 United Kingdom Literacy Association Book Award. LoveReading4Kids chose the book as their July 2012 "Book of the Month" and said, "Unashamedly for girls, this is a great story about friends and friendship" and called Pea a "bright, witty and clever young girl with lots of strategies for success up her sleeve!" Oxford Owl called the book a "reassuring read for anyone facing a move, whether it's to a new town, or secondary school". Rebecca Chappell from the The School Librarian compared the novel to a "girl's best friend" and thought it would give "pleasure" to girls over the age of seven; she added, "girls will sympathise with Pea's complicated home life and annoying siblings. Luckily this story has a happy ending with plenty of good advice given out along the way."

Robert James from The Bookbag praised the characters in the novel for being very "up to date" – including the same-sex family and the Brazilian au pair – and the "wonderful portrayal of family life", which he compared to the works of Noel Streatfeild and Edith Nesbit. He added, "As well as these fabulous characters, there's a sweet plot, a lovely message about making friends which is never hammered home too obviously, and a warm, engaging writing style which hooks you in straight away". He also called the book "wonderfully unpredictable" and found it really funny, particularly in the parts where Tinkerbell (who he referred to as sometimes being a "Stinkerbell") was involved. James also wrote, "Absolutely huge recommendation as one of the best books I've read all year and a definite modern classic in the making. I can't wait for book two!" Anne Faundez from Books for Keeps praised Day's "knack for delving deep into family life and transforming painful upheavals into humorous, everyday situations" in addition to the "memorable" and "vividly depicted" characters that Faundez called "boisterous, colourful and above all credible". She dubbed Pea "warm-hearted", Clover a "drama queen" and Tinkerbell "mischievous". Faundez added, "Incredibly funny and touching, with characters the reader cares about, the book will provide hours of pleasure."
