= Hayley Long =

English author

Hayley Long (born 1971) is an English author best known for her teen fiction. She is a recipient of the Tir na n-Og Award.

== Background ==
Long grew up in Felixstowe and studied English at Aberystwyth University before travelling abroad and then working in London, Cardiff and Norfolk as an English teacher.

== Writing ==
Long began writing while living in Wales and had her first novels published by Welsh publishers Parthian and Accent Press.

She is the author of the teen fiction series, Lottie Biggs which has been translated into Greek, Danish, Norwegian and French. The first book in the series, 'Lottie Biggs Is Not Mad' (Macmillan, July 2009)was awarded the White Raven label for outstanding children's literature by the International Youth Library. This was followed in May 2010 with Lottie Biggs Is Not Desperate which was longlisted for the Young Minds Book Award 2010. The final book in the trilogy is Lottie Biggs Is Not Tragic was released in August 2011.

In 2012, Long was shortlisted for the Queen of Teen Awards.

What's Up With Jody Barton? was published in May 2012. It was shortlisted for the 2012 Costa Book Award and was the winner of the seventh annual Essex Book Award in March 2013. Downside Up was published in July 2013.

Her novel Sophie Someone (2015, Hot Key Books) was shortlisted for the 2015 Costa Book Award for Children's Book.

She is also the author of a non-fiction text called Being a Girl (2015, Hot Key Books).

Long's latest novel is The Nearest Faraway Place (2017, Hot Key Books). With this title, Long won the Mal Peet Children's Award when it was named as the winner of the children's category in the 2017 East Anglian Book Awards.

In May 2018, Hayley won the 2018 Tir na n-Og award. This prize, organised by the Welsh Books Council, promotes English-language children's books with an authentic Welsh background.

== Bibliography ==
=== Novels ===
- Fire and Water (2004, Parthian)
- Kilburn Hoodoo (2006, Parthian)
- Vinyl Demand (2008, Accent Press) for the Quick Reads Initiative
- Lottie Biggs Is Not Mad (2009 Pan Macmillan)
- Lottie Biggs Is Not Desperate (2010 Pan Macmillan)
- Lottie Biggs Is Not Tragic (2011 Pan Macmillan)
- What's Up With Jody Barton? (2012 Pan Macmillan)
- Downside Up (2013 Pan Macmillan)
- Sophie Someone (2015, Hot Key Books)
- The Nearest Faraway Place (2017, Hot Key Books)

=== Non-fiction ===
- Being a Girl (2015, Hot Key Books)

=== Other Published Work ===
- The Library of Wales Education Resource Pack (2006, Parthian)
