= Set in Stone =

Set in Stone may refer to:

== Books ==
- Set in Stone, 2010 thriller novel by Catherine Dunne (writer)
- Set in Stone (novel), 2006 children's fantasy novel by Linda Newbery

== Music ==
- Set in Stone (Brian McFadden album), 2008
- Set in Stone (Lord album), 2009
- Set in Stone, a Stick Figure album, 2015
- Set in Stone, a Travis Tritt album, 2021
- Set in Stone (Rick Ross album), 2026
- "Set in Stone" (song), a song by Guy Sebastian, 2016

== See also ==
- Carved in Stone (disambiguation)
