= Readability survey =

A readability survey is a statistical survey of the ability of people to read given passages of text, written, formatted and/or laid-out in a variety of styles. The intent is to discover which are the preferable styles to use in order to maximise the ability of the reading audience to receive the intended message.

Tests may be performed by surveying real people reading the works, or an abbreviated test may be followed, where a number of works are surveyed using pre-determined scoring methodologies, which were themselves developed by systematically surveying real people's response to given texts.

These tests are commissioned or performed by entities like publishers, educators, design houses and governments, and have resulted in divination of a number of rules of thumb based on statistical analysis of results which demonstrate a level of consistency in certain parameters , such as the quantity and location of whitespace which obtains maximum readability (e.g. 20% whitespace in text body, margins should be around 40% of the width, for English textbooks, preferably including a column down the left side of the page, or split over both sides, or down the right side as a last resort if sufficient room on the left is not available).

A readability survey implementation may use one or more readability tests in scoring the works.

== Example readability surveys ==
- A Readability Survey of Technical and Popular Literature, Kwolek, Journalism Quarterly, 50, 2, 255–64, Sum 73
- Color Test Results, Scharff et al., Stephen F. Austin State University in Nacogdoches, Texas.

Here is one which is a survey of readability of surveys:

- Variation in the Readability of Items Within Surveys, Calderón et al., American Journal of Medical Quality, Vol. 21, No. 1, 49-56 (2006)

Many more may be found by searching the literature, for example

- Educational Resources Information Centre (ERIC) search: (Thesaurus Descriptors:readability AND Thesaurus Descriptors:surveys) accessed 20070121
- Reading Online Text: A Comparison of Four White Space Layouts , Chaparro et al., Usability News, February 24, 2006
- Reading Online Text with a Poor Layout: Is Performance Worse?, Chaparro et al., Usability News, February 24, 2006

== See also ==
- Journal of Research in Reading
