= Louise Dean (author) =

English novelist, living

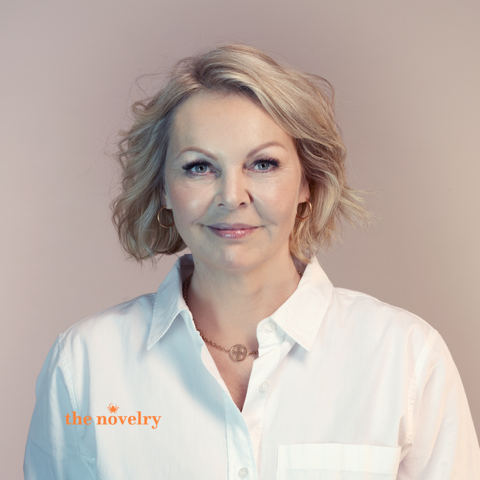
- Louise Dean credit @Belathée Photography
- Education: Downing College, Cambridge
- Writing career
- Years active: 2002 – present
- Genres: Literary; Humour; Historical; Thrillers
- Website: louisedean.com

Louise Dean is an English author. Her novels won the Betty Trask Award and Le Prince Maurice Prize, and were longlisted for the Guardian First Book Award, the International Dublin Literary Award, and the Booker Prize. Short stories of hers have appeared in Granta. She was a finalist in the 2021 Costa Book Awards. She founded and directs a worldwide creative writing school, The Novelry. The Nobel Prizewinner J. M. Coetzee is among many authors to acclaim her writing.

== Education ==
Dean went from Cranbrook School to Cambridge University, where she graduated with a degree in history from Downing College. She served as the Downing College May Ball President in 1991.

== Career ==
Dean began as a graduate management trainee for Unilever Plc at Brooke Bond Foods in Croydon. She went into advertising in 1994, working for Chiat/Day London, which became St Lukes, then as a planning director for Bates Asia in Hong Kong in 1995/1996 and at Fallon McElligott Berlin in New York in 1996/1997, before quitting to start an advertising agency in Manhattan. By 2001, Dean had written her first novel and left advertising to pursue writing full time, moving to Provence until 2007, when she returned to live in Kent with her children.

Dean's novels – Becoming Strangers (2004), This Human Season (2006), The Idea of Love (2008), The Old Romantic (2010) – have received worldwide attention. Her first won the Betty Trask Award and Le Prince Maurice and was longlisted for the Booker Prize.

Becoming Strangers was called a "pageturner" by The Guardian, whose reviewer compared her style to Alan Bennett's. It was one of The Observer's top five books of 2004. When published in the US, Dean was compared to John Updike by the San Francisco Chronicle, who called the novel of "breathtaking" and "extraordinary" and a promise of a "spectacular career".

This Human Season, her second novel, is set in The Troubles in Northern Ireland and was likewise praised. The Daily Telegraph declared it had surpassed her first. J. M. Coetzee wrote, "With clear-eyed compassion, and with all the resources of the novelist's art, Louise Dean leads us through those terrible days when for a while Belfast was a vortex for the worst of the world's cruelty and pain." Reviewing This Human Season for The Guardian, the novelist Ali Smith called Dean an eloquent architect of strengths and shapes of passion, and remarkable in her harshly lyrical delineations of the lives of women and girls... [This Human Season] is a novel which captures a community's resilience and its humour full of broken glass. Louise Dean describes the exact glint of this spirit."

Described as a "Brit Lit Star" in the US ("Brit Lit star lives up the hype." Ladies Home Journal), Dean was seen in The Guardian as "an audacious arrival in British fiction. She is unafraid to tackle unsexy or unsafe material."

In 2005 The Observer dubbed Dean a "significant voice in British fiction" and The Wall Street Journal called her one of the world's five most underrated authors.

Dean's Le Prince Maurice prize in 2006 involved an all-star ceremony in Mauritius with Tilda Swinton hosting. She was described by The Independent's John Walsh as "a giggly blonde dreamboat, who swears like a Folkestone docker and extends her long, slender body like an Anglepoise lamp.... Louise Dean read from a work-in-progress that contained a swaggering reference to anal sex.... The hotel bar erupted. We could have been in Las Vegas. You could say Ms Dean rose to the occasion. In her long, spider-patterned silk frock, she was transformed under the hot lights into an instant star, a flash-popping vision of perfect teeth, hair, bright eyes and décolletage. The literary world has found its Charlize Theron."

Dean's third novel, The Idea of Love (Penguin 2007), is a dark story of a pharmaceutical salesman peddling anti-depressants while dealing with a breakdown. It was hailed as an "unforgettable study of the dark side of the mind" by The Times and an "enormous delight" by The Independent.

The Old Romantic, her fourth novel (Penguin 2010), has widower Ken try to reunite his family in rural England while romancing an undertaker. Boyd Tonkin commented, "Like its predecessors, it channels the rough music of everyday life for non-Bloomsbury folk with a tragicomic subtlety, a pin-sharp ear for dialogue and a flair for every nuance of character and class. Beneath the mordant delights of observation lies a sharp awareness of the grander themes – love, selfhood, family, freedom and above all death – that haunt minds and shape lives in Kentish cottages, and executive-style new-build homes, as much as Kentish castles. Admirers of Beryl Bainbridge still grieving her loss should find solace here."

In 2017, Louise Dean founded The Novelry, a creative writing school for novelists. By 2021, the team of tutors included bestselling authors and The Novelry was working with leading global literary agencies to get new writing talent published via Dean's fast-track novel-writing courses.

In 2021, Louise Dean was a finalist for the Costa Book Award for Short Story.

== Books ==
- Becoming Strangers, 2004
- This Human Season, 2006
- The Idea of Love, 2008
- The Old Romantic, 2010
