= Mary Anne Atwood =

English writer (1817–1910)

- Mary Anne Atwood c. 1890
- Born: Mary Anne South; 1817; Dieppe, France
- Died: 1910 (aged 92–93)
- Resting place: Leake Church, Yorkshire
- Occupation: Writer
- Spouse: Alban Thomas Atwood
- Parents: Thomas South; Elise South (née Maurice)

Mary Anne Atwood (née South; 1817 – 1910) was an English writer on hermeticism and spiritual alchemy.

Atwood was born in Dieppe, France but grew up in Gosport, Hampshire. Her father, Thomas South, was a researcher into the history of spirituality, and she assisted and collaborated with her father from her youth. Mary Anne married the Anglican Reverend Alban Thomas Atwood in 1859, and moved to his parish near Thirsk in North Yorkshire where she spent the rest of her life. She continued private correspondence with several influential Theosophists until her death in 1910. Her final words were "I cannot find my centre of gravity."

She is buried at Leake Church in Yorkshire.

== Works ==
Atwood's first publication, Early Magnetism in its higher relations to humanity (1846), was issued pseudonymously as the work of Θυος Μαθος (Gk. thuos mathos), an anagram of Thomas South.

A Suggestive Inquiry into the Hermetic Mystery (1850) was written by Atwood at her father's request, and in parallel with his own composition of a lengthy poem on the same subject. Thomas South paid for the book to be published anonymously in 1850, but without having read it, trusting his daughter's judgement. Reading it after publication, he believed Mary Anne had revealed many hermetic secrets that were better left unpublished, and therefore bought up the remaining stock and, with his daughter, burnt them, along with the unfinished manuscript of his poem. Only a few copies of the book survived.

Atwood published nothing after A Suggestive Inquiry. Walter Leslie Wilmshurst, in his 1918 introduction to the reissue, laments that the thoughts of her later years did not find fruition in another work. He claims, however, that there is much to be found in her papers, of which he was then in possession. These have not yet been published. The special collections archive of the Brown University library currently holds around 700 of Ms. Atwood's letters.

== Influence ==
A Suggestive Inquiry was reissued in 1918 under Mary Anne's married name, with an appendix containing her table talk and memorabilia, and with an extensive biographical and philosophical introduction by Walter Leslie Wilmshurst. Principe and Newman (2001) considered A Suggestive Inquiry to be one of three books which started the influence of the spiritual interpretation of alchemy in early modern Europe.

== In popular culture ==
The writer Lindsay Clarke used the story of Thomas South and Mary Anne Atwood as a basis for his novel The Chymical Wedding (1989).

The book A Suggestive Inquiry... was being read by Pink in the music video for the single U + Ur Hand.

== See also ==
- Isabelle de Steiger
