= October, October =

2021 novel by Katya Balen

- First edition cover
- Author: Katya Balen
- Illustrator: Angela Harding
- Genre: Children's novel
- Publisher: Bloomsbury
- Publication date: 30 September 2021
- Pages: 304
- Awards: Carnegie Medal for Writing
- ISBN: 9781526601933
- Website: October, October at Blooomsbury

October, October is a children's novel by British writer Katya Balen, published by Bloomsbury Children's Books in 2021. It won the 2022 Carnegie Medal.

== Plot summary ==
October and her father live a off-grid life deep in the woods. They love the natural world and do not feel any need for other people. Then, after October's eleventh birthday, her father falls from a tree, her mother comes back into her life, and her world changes. She moves to the city and finds the adjustment difficult.

== Reception ==
October, October was awarded the 2022 Carnegie Medal for Writing and also received the Carnegie Shadowers' Choice Award for Writing Winners, selected by children's reading groups.

The United Kingdom Literacy Association's Book Award for children of 7–10+, chosen by teachers, was awarded to the novel in the same year.

The novel was also highly commended for the 2022 Wainwright Prize for Children's Writing on Nature and Conservation.

In a review for Books for Keeps, Jane Churchill says "This is a sensitive and beautiful story showing the importance of storytelling to enrich our lives. The writing is lyrical and evocative and relishes in both the smaller details and the more powerful forces of nature"; she also praises the illustrations.

Awards
Preceded by Look Both Ways	Carnegie Medal recipient 2022	Succeeded by The Blue Book of Nebo
