= Natasha Farrant (author) =

British children's author

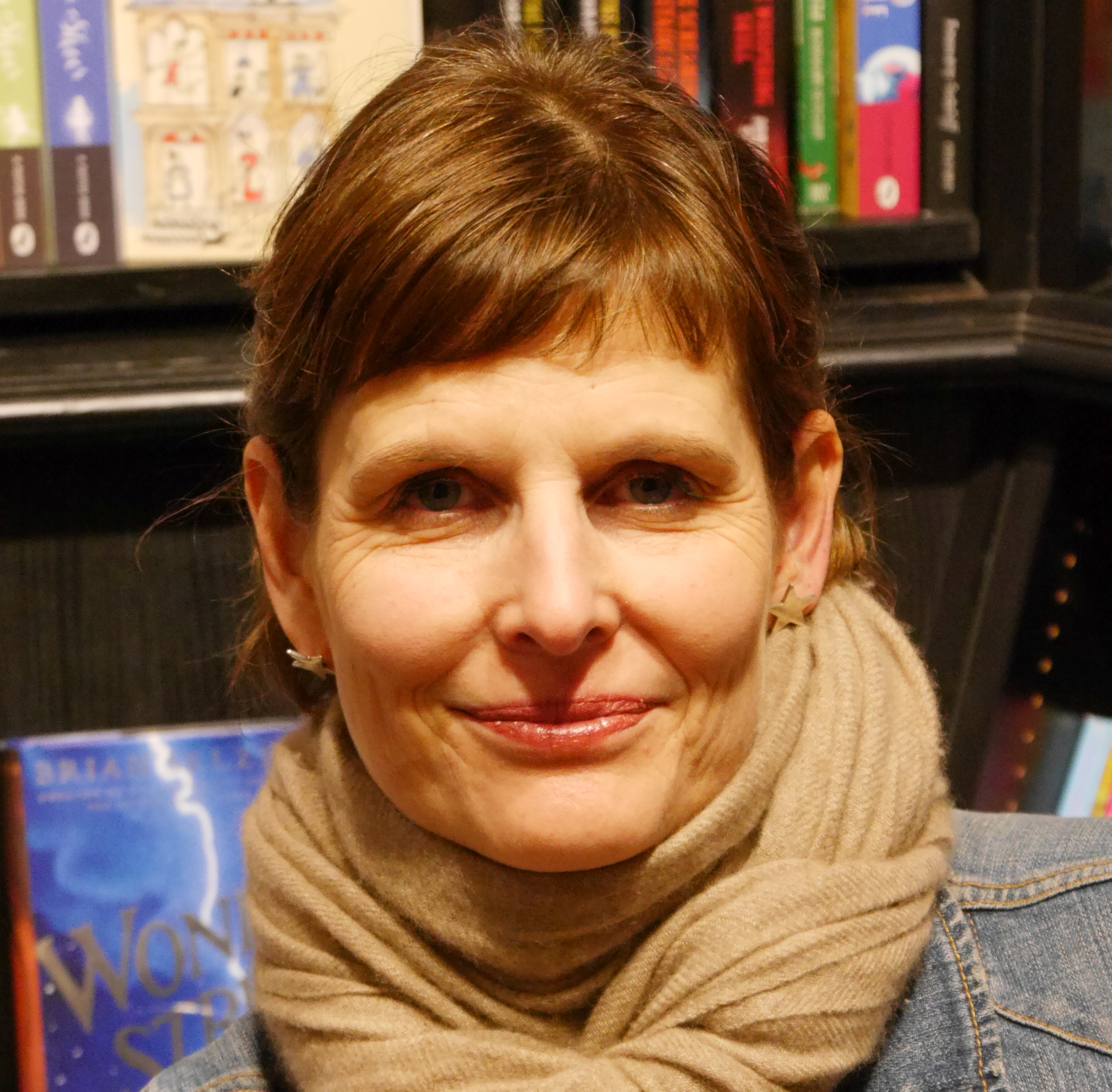
- Farrant in 2019
- Education: University of Oxford; London School of Economics (MSc); Institute of Linguists
- Occupation: Children's author
- Writing career
- Notable awards: Costa Book Award for Children's Book (2021)
- Website: natashafarrant.com

Natasha Farrant is a British children's author. In 2020, she won the Costa Book Award for Children's Book for Voyage of the Sparrowhawk.

== Personal life and education ==
Farrant was born in London, England and is three-quarters French. She earned a degree in Modern Languages from the University of Oxford, a Master of Science in Social Anthropology from the London School of Economics, and a Diploma in Translation from the Institute of Linguists.

Farrant is married with two adult daughters.

== Awards and honours ==
Eight Princesses and a Magic Mirror is a Junior Library Guild book. In 2019, The Guardian included it on their list of the year's best books for children ages five to eight years old.

In 2013, Kirkus Reviews included After Iris on their list of the best middle-grade books of the year.

In 2020, The Sunday Times included Voyage of the Sparrowhawk on their list of the best children's books of the year. Two years later, Booklist included it on their list of the year's "Top 10 Historical Fiction for Youth".

In February 2023, Waterstones included The Rescue of Ravenwood on their list of the best books of the month. The Sunday Times included it in an ongoing list of the best children's books of the year.

Awards for Farrant's writing
Year	Title	Award	Result	Ref.
2013	The Things We Did for Love	Branford Boase Award	Shortlist	
2014	Flora in Love	Guardian Children's Fiction Prize	Longlist	
2014	Flora in Love	Queen of Teen Award	Shortlist	
2015	After Iris	UKLA Book Award	Longlist	
2018	Lydia: The Wild Girl of Pride and Prejudice	Carnegie Medal	Nominee	
2018	Lydia: The Wild Girl of Pride and Prejudice	UKLA Book Award	Longlist	
2019	The Children of Castle Rock	Carnegie Medal	Nominee	
2019	The Children of Castle Rock	UKLA Book Award	Longlist	
2021	Voyage of the Sparrowhawk	Booklist Editors' Choice: Books for Youth	Selection	
2021	Voyage of the Sparrowhawk	Costa Book Award for Children's Book	Winner	
2021	Eight Princesses and a Magic Mirror	Carnegie Medal	Nominee	
2021	Voyage of the Sparrowhawk	Spark Book Award	Winner	
2022	Voyage of the Sparrowhawk	Carnegie Medal	Nominee	
2022	Voyage of the Sparrowhawk	UKLA Book Award	Longlist	
2023	The Girl Who Talked to Trees	UKLA Book Award	Longlist	

== Publications ==
=== Bluebell Gadsby books ===
- After Iris, 2013
- Flora in Love, 2014
- All About Pumpkin, 2015
- Time for Jas, 2016

=== Other ===
- Diving Into Light, 2012
- Some Other Eden, 2012
- The Things We Did for Love, 2012
- Lydia: The Wild Girl of Pride & Prejudice, 2016
- The Children of Castle Rock, 2018
- Eight Princesses and a Magic Mirror, 2019
- Voyage of the Sparrowhawk, 2020
- The Girl Who Talked to Trees, 2021
- The Rescue of Ravenwood, 2023
- The Secret of Golden Island,2024
