= Wranglestone =

2020 young-adult novel by Darren Charlton

- Author: Darren Charlton
- Language: English
- Genre: Young adult fiction
- Published: 2020
- Publisher: Stripes Publishing (Little Tiger Press)
- Publication place: United Kingdom
- Pages: 384
- ISBN: 978-1-78895-121-0

Wranglestone is the first novel from British author Darren Charlton, published in 2020 by Stripes Publishing. A post-apocalyptic tale set in a zombie-infested island in the United States, it was positively reviewed.

== Synopsis ==
Wranglestone follows the burgeoning relationship between two boys, Peter and Cooper, in a post-apocalyptic America ravaged by zombies. The novel tracks the survival of an island community living within a fictional national park and the threat winter poses once the water freezes allowing the Dead to cross the ice.

== Publication ==
Wranglestone was published by the Stripes Publishing imprint of Little Tiger Press as part of a two-book deal that included its sequel. The follow-up installment, 2022's Timberdark, was originally planned for 2021.

== Reception ==
The novel was a "Best Children's Book" nominee at the 2020 Costa Book Awards. The Guardian called it "an achingly tender love story", while Dublin's Sunday Independent found it "surprisingly well written...creepy, compelling and cute all at the same time. What more could you want?" Martin Axford of The School Librarian said, "The horror elements in [this unusual] book will appeal to some readers, just as they will turn others off." Sophie Brown of GeekMom was favourable with the premise and worldbuilding, but found the plot convoluted and rushed for a title of its length. "[A lot goes on in this book;] the romance between Peter and Cooper was one of the plot elements that suffered because of this," she said. "[Still, this is] an interesting and unique take on both an LGBTQ romance and a zombie apocalypse story, throwing both elements together with a good pinch of politics and prejudice that make for a real page-turner."
