= The Chymical Wedding =

1989 novel by Lindsay Clarke

- First edition (UK)
- Author: Lindsay Clarke
- Language: English
- Genre: Magical realism, occult
- Publisher: Jonathan Cape, Ltd. (London)
- Publication date: 1989
- Publication place: United Kingdom
- Media type: Hardcover
- Pages: 536 pp (Hardback edition)
- ISBN: 0-394-57937-2
- Dewey Decimal: 823.914 dc20
- LC Class: PR6053.L3295C47 1989 89-45304

The Chymical Wedding is a 1989 novel by Lindsay Clarke about the intertwined lives of six people in two different eras. Inspired by the life of Mary Anne Atwood, the book includes themes of alchemy, the occult, fate, passion, and obsession. It won the Whitbread Prize for fiction in 1989.
