= Morag Hood (author) =

Scottish writer and illustrator of children's books (b. 1986)

Morag Hood (born 1986) is a Scottish writer and illustrator of children's books. Her primary medium is lino printing, although she uses a variety of techniques in her work. Her stories rely on interplay between text and illustration, creating space in the narrative for young readers to fill in. Many of her stories concern relationships, inclusion and prejudice. She has an MA in children's book illustration from the Cambridge School of Art. Hood was the winner of the UKLA book awards in the 3–6 category in 2018, for Colin and Lee, Carrot and Pea, and in 2019 for I am Bat. Her books have been nominated for several other awards, including the Kate Greenaway Medal in 2017, 2018 and 2019.

== Published works ==
Hood is primarily published by the Two Hoots, an imprint of Macmillan Publishers. The Sophie Johnson series is published by Simon & Schuster.

=== As author and illustrator ===
- Colin and Lee, Carrot and Pea was Hood's first book, published in 2017. The work deals with a pea and a carrot who are friends with different abilities and limitations. Kirkus Reviews described the book as having "understated humor" and "thought-provoking illustrations." Booklist's reviewer wrote that the book accessibly conveys "the familiar, welcome theme of accepting and embracing differences". The book won the 2018 UKLA Book Awards in the 3 to 6 category. The work has also appeared in translations to German, Spanish and Chinese.
- I am Bat, published in 2017, tells the story of a fruit bat with a preference for cherries. After the cherries disappear the bat is instead pleased to discover a pear. Kirkus Reviews described the bat's adaptability as amusing and praised the book for its "eloquent brevity". The book was shortlisted for the 2019 Bookbug Picture Book Prize and formed part of a package distributed to primary 1 pupils in Scotland in November 2018 by the Scottish Book Trust. Like Hood's first book, I am Bat won the 2019 UKLA Book Awards in the 3 to 6 category.
- The Steves, published in 2018, is about two puffins both of which are named Steve. Neither Steve wishes to adapt his name to differentiate from the other. "Hood employs simple, childlike syntax, including just enough grossness to ensure giggles from young readers," writes Kirkus. The Guardian included the book in a list of the best new picture books and novels for children in the spring of 2018.
- When Grandad was a Penguin, published in 2018, tells the story of a grandfather who seems somewhat altered: His clothes no longer fit, his interests lean strongly toward fish and he starts dwelling in odd places around the house. After a call from the zoo it turns out that due to a mix-up the grandfather has been dwelling in the penguin enclosure, while a penguin has taken up residence at the grandfather's house. In a review in The Times Literary Supplement Imogen Russell Williams writes that the book "...is a succession of deadpan visual jokes of the best, most child-involving kind, where the sparse text always plays the straight man to the illustration’s punchline."
- Aalfred and Aalbert, published in 2019, tells the story of two aardvarks who have different sleep cycles and seem destined never to meet. A bird takes on the role of match-maker, determined to arrange a meeting, but the project is a difficult one. Finally the two do meet and live happily ever after. The Times Literary Supplement called the book a "superbly comic though still subtle and understated gay love story." Kirkus Reviews writes that the "simple, deadpan narrative shows flashes of laugh-out-loud moments."
- Brenda is a Sheep, published in 2019, tells the story of an unusual sheep, named Brenda. Brenda has gray, sleek fur, long teeth and does not care for grass. The other sheep in the flock adore their friend Brenda, even as Brenda's hunger grows and she starts planning a great feast, which will require a lot of mint sauce. A review in the Lancashire Post says: "Brenda Is A Sheep is full of [...] clever playfulness, imaginative power and endearing mischievousness." Imogen Russell Williams described the book as "delightfully deadpan".

=== As author ===
- Sophie Johnson: Unicorn Expert, was published in 2018 and is illustrated by Ella Okstad. The book describes the daily trials of a young girl, Sophie Johnson, who devotes her life to exploring unicorns but fails to recognise one which wanders into her home. Books for Keeps describes the book as a "skilful combination of text and illustration, each supporting the other while still leaving gaps for the reader to fill in". The book was shortlisted for the Bookbug Picture Book Prize 2020 and the book will be part of a package distributed to primary 1 pupils in Scotland by the Scottish Book Trust in 2020.
- Sophie Johnson: Detective Genius is a sequel of the previous book, published in 2019 and also illustrated by Ella Okstad. In this story Sophie has decided to turn to detective work, and is busy tutoring her toys, younger sibling and pets about the profession. While Sophie drones on about her impressive detective skills, her dog solves a couple of crimes unnoticed by Sophie. "I was impressed by the way the words and pictures work seamlessly together and I simply loved some of the scenarios and details used to contrast Sophie’s words with the true situation," writes Madge Eekal and Booklist described the book as "An entertaining story, touched with whimsy".

== Biography ==
Hood has a BA in costume design from Wimbledon College of Arts and an MA in children's book illustration from the Cambridge School of Art. As an art student, she entered the competition for the Macmillan Prize and both of her entries were shortlisted. Prior to her writing career, she worked with several theatre companies as a costume designer, including the Young Vic, before realising she wanted to create children's books. She lives in Edinburgh with her husband, Icelandic writer Snorri Kristjánsson.
