= Carved in Stone =

Carved in Stone may refer to:

- Carved in Stone (Rage album)
- Carved in Stone (Shadow Gallery album)
- Carved in Stone (Vince Neil album)

== See also ==
- Carved into Stone, an album by Prong
- Set in Stone (disambiguation)
