= Kit de Waal =

English novelist and short story writer (born 1960)

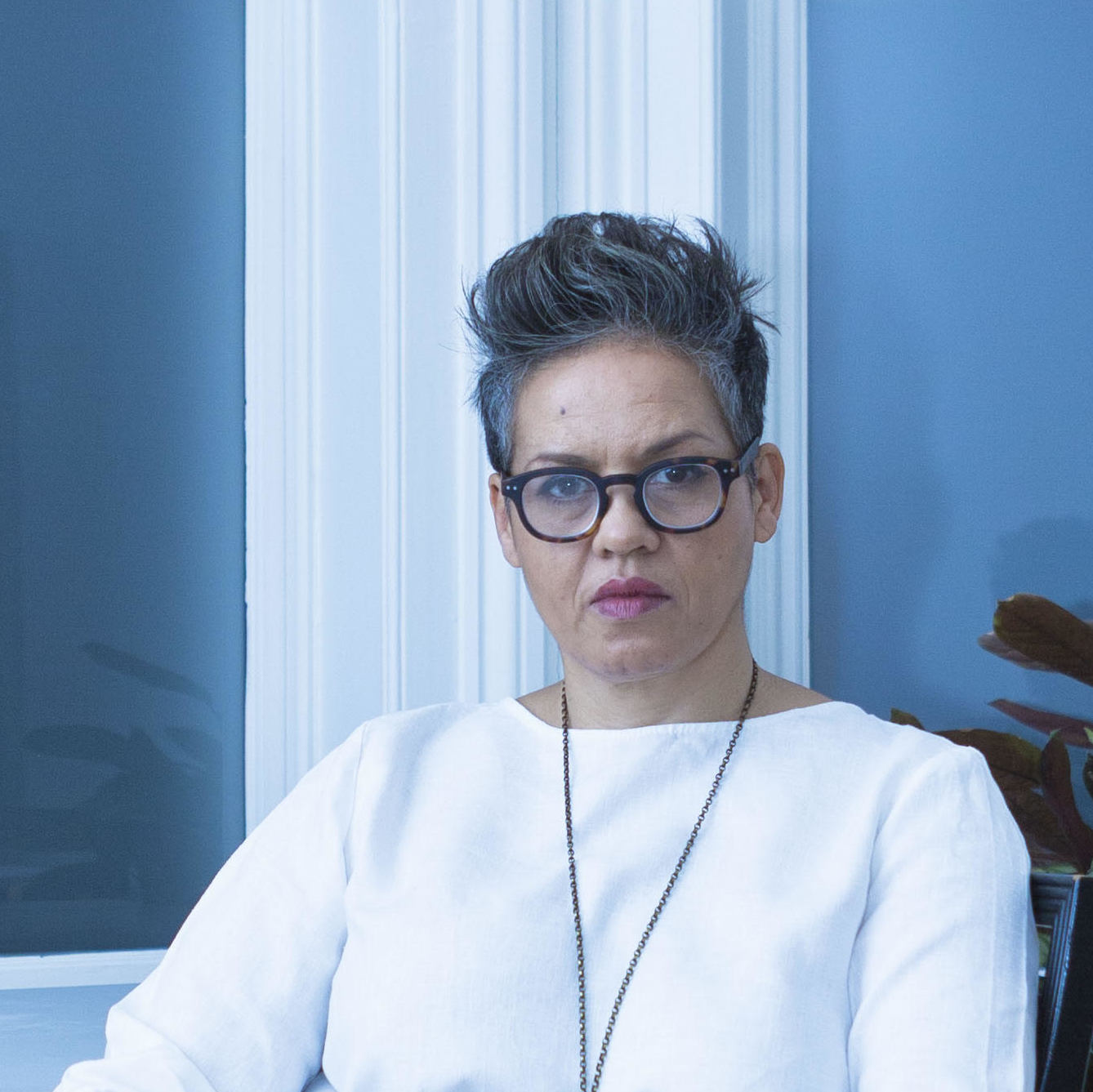
- Born: Mandy Theresa O'Loughlin; July 26, 1960 (age 66); Birmingham, England
- Education: Oxford Brookes University
- Occupation: Writer
- Writing career
- Notable works: My Name Is Leon; Supporting Cast
- Notable awards: Bath Short Story Award (2014) Bridport Flash Fiction Prize (2014, 2015) SI Leeds Literary Prize Reader's Choice (2014)
- Website: kitdewaal.com

Mandy Theresa O'Loughlin (born 26 July 1960), known professionally as Kit de Waal, is a British-Irish writer. Her debut novel, My Name Is Leon, was published by Penguin Books in June 2016. After securing the publishing deal with Penguin, de Waal used some of her advance to set up the Kit de Waal Creative Writing Scholarship to help improve working-class representation in the arts. The audiobook version of My Name is Leon is voiced by Lenny Henry. De Waal has also published short stories, including the collection Supporting Cast (2020). She is visiting professor in creative writing at the University of Leicester.

== Early life ==
De Waal was born in Birmingham, in the West Midlands of England, and grew up in the suburb of Moseley. She is a national of both Britain and Ireland. Her mother, Sheila O'Loughlin (née Doyle), was a foster carer, registered child minder and auxiliary nurse. Her father, Arthur Desmond O'Loughlin, was an African-Caribbean bus driver from Basseterre, Saint Kitts. De Waal was brought up in Birmingham among the Irish community, and recalls: "We were the only black children at the Irish Community Centre and the only ones with a white mother at the West Indian Social Club."

== Education and career ==
De Waal attended Waverley Grammar School in Small Heath, Birmingham. She worked for 15 years in criminal and family law as a magistrate. She sat on adoption panels, worked as an adviser for social services and has written training manuals on adoption and foster care.

She studied creative writing at Oxford Brookes University, achieving a master's degree.

Her debut novel, My Name Is Leon, about a mixed-race nine-year-old boy, is set against the backdrop of the 1981 Handsworth riots and was published in 2016 by Viking Press after a six-way auction between publishers. It drew on her personal and professional experience of foster care and the adoption system:

I was brought up like that, I'm mixed race, I have adopted children, I’ve trained social workers. In 1981 I was living in Handsworth in Birmingham, where the riots were happening at the end of my road.

The novel won the Irish Novel of the Year Award in 2017, and was included on the shortlists for the Costa Book Award for First Novel and the Desmond Elliott Prize. My Name Is Leon was produced as an audiobook voiced by Lenny Henry, who has also optioned it for a television adaptation.

De Waal writes short stories and flash fiction, and won the Bath Short Story Award in 2014, the Bridport Prize for Flash Fiction in 2014 and 2015 and the SI Leeds Literary Prize Reader's Choice in 2014. Her short-story collection Supporting Cast, about the lives of secondary characters from her novels, was published by Penguin in 2020. As well as being published in anthologies (such as Margaret Busby's 2019 New Daughters of Africa), de Waal's work has been broadcast on radio, including her story "Adrift at the Athena", which was commissioned for the anthology A Midlands Odyssey by Nine Arches Press, and "The Beautiful Thing", which was read on BBC Radio 4 by Burt Caesar.

She has written about the need for the publishing industry to be more inclusive, and on 22 November 2017 she presented the BBC Radio 4 programme Where Are All the Working Class Writers? exploring issues of inclusivity in the arts and working-class representation in present-day British literature. She edited Common People: An Anthology of Working-Class Writers, which was crowd-funded and published through Unbound in May 2019.

In 2019, she became an ambassador for the audiobook charity Listening Books.

In March 2020, de Waal co-founded with Molly Flatt a three-day virtual books festival called The Big Book Weekend, broadcast live across three days over the first bank holiday weekend in May as part of BBC Arts' "Culture In Quarantine" programming.

She was elected a Fellow of the Royal Society of Literature in 2022.

== The Kit de Waal Creative Writing Scholarship ==
Three days after winning a publishing deal for My Name Is Leon, she began setting up a scholarship for writers from disadvantaged backgrounds. Launched in October 2016 The Kit de Waal Creative Writing Scholarship is a scholarship, created by de Waal using some of her advance for her novel, at the Department of English and Humanities at Birkbeck, University of London. It provides a fully funded place for one student to study on the Birkbeck Creative Writing MA, and also includes a travel bursary to allow the student to travel into London for classes and Waterstones vouchers to allow the student to buy books on the reading list. The inaugural scholarship was awarded to former Birmingham poet laureate Stephen Morrison-Burke.

== Awards ==
Publication	Year	Awards
My Name Is Leon	2016	Irish Book of the Year, shortlisted for Desmond Elliott Prize
"Crushing Big"	2015	Bridport Prize for Flash Fiction First Prize
"I Am the Painter's Daughter"	2015	Bare Fiction for Flash Fiction Second Prize
"Romans 1 Verse 29, Sins of the Heart"	2014	Bridport Prize for Flash Fiction First Prize
"The Beautiful Thing"	2014	Bath Short Story Award Second Prize
"The Old Man & The Suit"	2014	Costa Book Award for Short Story Second Prize
"Blue in Green"	2014	SI Leeds Literary Prize Readers' Choice
"A Taste of Death"	2011	Shortlisted for Fish Short Story Prize

== Books ==
- My Name Is Leon (2016)
- The Trick to Time (2018)
- Supporting Cast (2020)
- Without Warning and Only Sometimes: Scenes from an Unpredictable Childhood (2022)
- The Best of Everything (2025)
- Sweet Pea (2026)
