= The Garden (novel) =

2025 novel by Nick Newman

- First edition cover
- Author: Nick Newman
- Language: English
- Genres: Science fiction
- Publisher: Doubleday
- Publication date: 30 January 2025
- Publication place: United Kingdom
- Media type: Hardcover
- Pages: 288
- ISBN: 978-0-85752-999-2

The Garden is a 2025 science fiction novel by Nick Newman, pen name of English writer Nicholas Bowling. It is his first adult fiction novel, having previously published six young adult novels as Nicholas Bowling. The book was first published in the United Kingdom in January 2025 by Doubleday, and in the United States in February 2025 by G. P. Putnam's Sons. The Garden is about two sisters confined to a garden isolated from the outside world devastated by climate change.

== Background ==
Bowling stated that The Garden was written while confined to rural Scotland during the 2020 COVID-19 pandemic lockdown. He said in a Writer's Routine podcast that his first ideas for the book were a lush garden in the middle of a desert tended to by a woman with a supernatural connection to the natural world. He initially intended it to be a children's novel, but as he began to work on it, he introduced climate change and turned it into a book for adults with two elderly sisters as the protagonists.

Bowling cited several books has having influenced the development of The Garden. These include Cormac McCarthy's post-apocalyptic novel, The Road, and Susanna Clarke’s "modern tribute to Plato's allegory of the cave", Piranesi.

== Plot summary ==
The Garden takes place after an unknown global catastrophe at an unspecified place and time. Two elderly sisters, Evelyn and Lily live by themselves in a walled-off garden. Their childhood home is boarded up except for the kitchen, where they cook and sleep. They tend to the garden where they grow their food, following instructions in an almanac written by their deceased mother. Before their mother died, she boarded up the house, save for the kitchen, and told her then young daughters not to venture outside the property's walls as it is an unpopulated wasteland and dangerous. After she died, the sisters grew up believing they were the only surviving people in the world. They remember very little of their former lives as all their memories are locked away in the house. Violent sand storms occasionally blow in from outside, but each time the sisters are able to restore the garden.

One day, Evelyn and Lily are shocked to discover that a creature has breached the wall from outside. The sisters are repulsed by it and want to kill it, but soon discover that it is an injured boy. They take pity on him and nurse him back to health. Soon the boy is helping them with their daily chores. The sisters discover from him that there are others "out there", but that he does not want to return to them. Then the most devesting sand storm descends on the garden and buries it and part of the house. The boy and the sisters break into, and take shelter in, the forbidden house. When the storm is over, with no garden left and the house partially destroyed, the boy takes the sisters beyond the garden wall and into the outside world.

== Critical reception ==
Reviewing The Garden in The Minnesota Star Tribune, Maren Longbella noted Newman's oblique references to the Garden of Eden and the 1911 children's novel, The Secret Garden by Frances Hodgson Burnett. She said Newman, himself an author of several children's novels (using his real name, Nicholas Bowling), "is particularly adept at sustaining a child’s-eye view of events". While Evelyn and Lily are adults, their behaviour is still child-like, not knowing anything beyond the garden's walls since they were very young. Longbella said in places The Garden reads like "a dark fairy tale", but she welcomed Newman's "foray into the adult realm". Writing in the Chicago Review of Books, Philip Janowski described The Garden as "a modern fable" with elements of speculative fiction. He said Evelyn and Lily's characters are "well drawn", but the world they live in is "blurry and hard to see". Janowski concluded that "modern literature could use more intelligent adult fables", and stated that he would welcome them.

In a review in Locus magazine, Paul DiFilippo wrote that while most "Post-Collapse" fiction dwells on the destroyed world, Newman focuses on the sanctuary. DiFilippo stated that despite the story's confined setting with initially only two characters, the author demonstrates his writing skills by making the sisters' narrative "compelling" and their garden "vivid". He noted how Newman "beautifully limns the personalities of the women, and how they interact ... each one providing something the other one lacks." DiFilippo concluded that what drives the plot is Newman’s "wonderful prose, which blends tactility with emotions and memories." In another review in Locus magazine, Science fiction editor and critic Gary K. Wolfe wrote that in the beginning, The Garden introduces the two elderly sisters with a "quiet, almost ruminative tone", but the "graceful and almost serene prose" becomes "darker" with "rawer emotions" when their daily rituals are disrupted. Wolfe noted that as in Cormac McCarthy's The Road, The Garden reveals no details of book's "environmental apocalypse", and Newman focuses more on the "vulnerable and often quite affecting characters" than science fiction consistencies. Wolfe added that "elderly protagonists ... are still far too rare in SF".

Reviewing the book in The Washington Post, Samuel Ashworth wrote that in The Garden, Newman "tests the boundaries of climate change fiction" by focusing entirely on the sanctuary and eliminating the rest of the world. Ashworth said much of the book is taken up with Evelyn's musings and the sisters' repetitive tasks, which he felt tended to dampen the narrative. The fear surrounding the boy's appearance is drawn out "with maximum slowness", which Ashworth likened to Hans Zimmer's film score to Interstellar. He felt that Newman's attempt to "infuse every page ... with a nameless dread" does not always work, and creates the impression that The Garden is "a bracing short story thrown on Procrustes' bed and stretched into a full-length novel. However, Ashworth added that The Garden "is not without grace": towards the end, "Newman finally seizes on something aching and real", and "the true meaning of sanctuary" is revealed.
