= Snorri Hergill Kristjánsson =

Icelandic writer (born 1974)

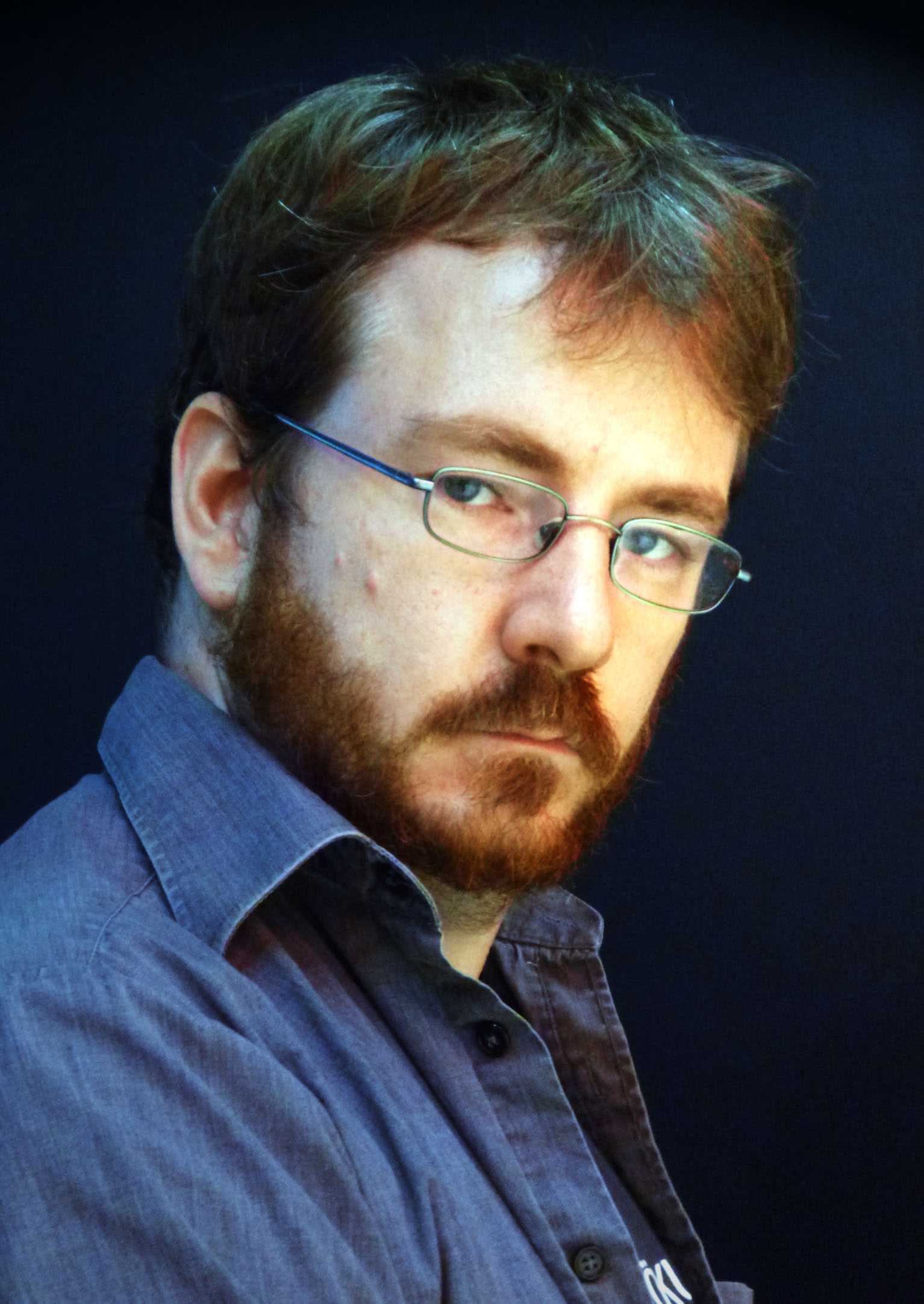
Snorri Kristjánsson 2014

Snorri Kristjánsson (born 1974, Reykjavík) is an Iceland-born writer. His family moved to Norway in 1983, where he lived for seven years. Since 2005, Snorri, has been based in The United Kingdom, and currently lives in Edinburgh with his wife, Morag Hood. Swords of Good Men, a Viking fantasy novel, is his first novel released in 2013, and the first instalment of the Valhalla Saga. The second part of the saga is called Blood Will Follow and the third part Path of the Gods. He has since then published two books in the Helga Finnsdottir series, Kin and Council. He graduated with a BA in English from the University of Iceland in 2010, his thesis was on editing a novel, supported by two 300-page manuscripts of the book that would ultimately become Swords of Good Men. Prior to that he studied drama at the London Academy of Music and Dramatic Art.

== Novels ==
- Swords of Good Men (2013), Book 1 of the Valhalla Saga. Published by Jo Fletcher Books in the UK and Quercus Books in the US.
- Blood Will Follow (2014), Book 2 of the Valhalla Saga. Published by Jo Fletcher Books in the UK and Quercus Books in the US.
- Path of Gods (2015), Book 3 of the Valhalla Saga. Published by Jo Fletcher Books in the UK and Quercus Books in the US.
- Kin (2018), Book 1 of the Helga Finnsdottir series. Published by Jo Fletcher Books in the UK
- Council (2019), Book 2 of the Helga Finnsdottir series. Published by Jo Fletcher Books in the UK
