= Lindsay Clarke =

British novelist

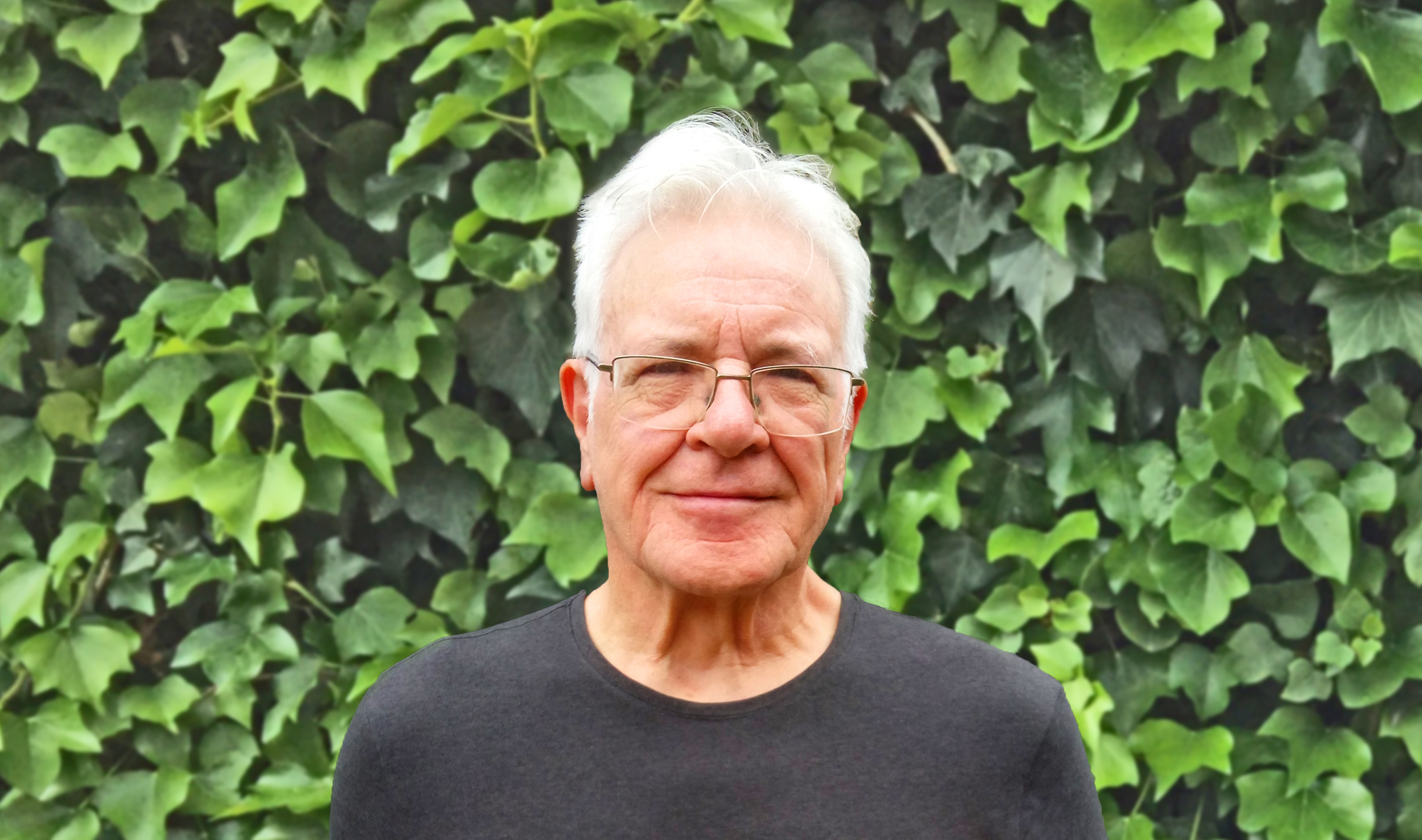
- Clarke in 2018
- Born: 1939 (age 86–87); Halifax, England, United Kingdom
- Notable work: The Chymical Wedding
- Website: https://lindsayclarkeauthor.com/

Lindsay Clarke (born 1939) is a British novelist. He was educated at Heath Grammar School in Halifax and at King's College, Cambridge. The landscape of hills, moors and crags around Halifax informed the growth of his imagination, while King's refined his sensibility and sharpened his intellect.

His debut novel, Sunday Whiteman, was shortlisted for the David Higham First Novel Award, and his second novel The Chymical Wedding, partly inspired by the life of Mary Atwood, won the Whitbread Prize in 1989. Clarke's most recent novel is The Water Theatre (published in September 2010. In her review of the novel in The Times Antonia Senior said "There is nothing small about this book. It is huge in scope, in energy, in heart...It is difficult to remember a recent book that is at once so beautiful and yet so thought provoking." The Water Theatre was selected as a winner of the inaugural Fiction Uncovered competition in 2011 and was included among The Times's Books of the Year. In 2012, The Water Theatre was chosen as the inaugural e-book publication of The New York Review of Books under their NYRB Lit imprint.

Before becoming a writer, Lindsay's career in education took him to Akim-Oda, Ghana, where he worked as Senior Master of a co-educational boarding school. He has also worked in the United States. He lectures in creative writing at Cardiff University, is a Creative Consultant to The Pushkin Trust in Northern Ireland, and teaches writing workshops in Frome, London and at the Arvon Foundation. He has had four radio plays broadcast on BBC Radio 4, and a number of his articles and reviews have been published in Resurgence and The London Magazine. Lindsay has one daughter from his first marriage. In 2014 he was awarded a Civil List Pension "in recognition of services to literature."

Clarke passionately believes in the power of the creative imagination and writes about imagination, consciousness and mythology in his blog.

== Publications ==
=== Troy Quartet ===
1. A Prince of Troy (2019) ISBN 0-00-837104-0
2. The War at Troy (2004), ISBN 0-00-715026-1
3. The Spoils of Troy (2019) ISBN 0-00-837108-3
4. The Return from Troy (2005), ISBN 0-00-715027-X

=== Novels ===
- Sunday Whiteman (1987)ISBN 0-224-02488-4
- The Chymical Wedding (1989)ISBN 0-224-02537-6
- Alice's Masque (1994)ISBN 0-224-03287-9
- Parzival and the Stone from Heaven (2001), ISBN 0-00-710813-3
- The Water Theatre (2010)

=== Poetry ===
- Stoker (2006), Phoenix Poetry Pamphlet
- A Dance with Hermes (2016), ISBN 978-1-906900-43-4

=== Non-fiction ===
- Imagining Otherwise (2004), GreenSpirit Pamphlet No. 6 ISBN 0-9532551-7-4
- Green Man Dreaming: Reflections on Imagination, Myth, and Memory (2018), ISBN 978-1-906900-56-4

=== Anthologies edited ===
- Essential Celtic Mythology (1997), ISBN 1-85538-477-9. Reprinted as Lindsay Clarke's Traditional Celtic Stories (1999), ISBN 0-7225-3983-5.
- The Gist: A Celebration of the Imagination (2012), ISBN 978-0-9568735-2-1 (Editor)
