= Blood Red Road =

2011 dystopian novel by Moira Young

- First edition (Canada)
- Author: Moira Young
- Language: English
- Genre: Post-apocalyptic fiction
- Publisher: Doubleday (Canada)
- Publication date: June 7, 2011
- Publication place: United Kingdom
- Media type: Print (hardcover), e-book, paperback
- Pages: 544
- ISBN: 978-1407124261
- Followed by: Rebel Heart

Blood Red Road is a dystopian novel by Moira Young, published in June 2011 by Marion Lloyd Books in the UK, Margaret K. McElderry Books in the US, and Doubleday in Canada. It was Young's first book and it inaugurated a trilogy under the series title Dust Lands. The first sequel Rebel Heart followed in 2012. Raging Star concluded the series in June 2014. Internet Speculative Fiction Database tags the books as post-apocalyptic science fiction for young adults.

== Plot ==
Saba lives with her father (her mother is dead), twin brother Lugh, and younger sister Emmi in a wasteland, Silverlake, where laws do not exist. Half a year after Saba and Lugh turned eighteen, four cloaked horsemen show up, kill the father, and kidnap Lugh. The novel revolves around Saba's quest to find and rescue her brother, with whom she has a close relationship. The two are captured by a couple, Rooster Pinch and Miz Pinch, who force Saba to fight in the Colosseum for a man known as the Cage Master. The couple, Mr. and Mrs. Pinch, keep Saba fighting by abusing and threatening the life of Emmi. Saba and her sister eventually escape from Hopetown, the place where the Colosseum is located, with a fellow fighter named Jack and a group of female warriors known as the Free Hawks.

As the story progresses, Saba learns that Mr. and Mrs. Pinch are actually the parents of a king who uses an addictive drug to control people. This same king is the one who sent the four cloaked horsemen, known as the Tonton, to kidnap Lugh. Not only are more plans made to rescue Lugh, but more conflict ensues and a romance develops between Saba and Jack. In the end, she manages to rescue Lugh but Epona (a Free Hawk), and Ike (a friend of Jack's), die near the ending of the book. At the end of the novel, Jack heads of The Lost Cause to inform Molly of Ike's death while Saba and her family head west to The Big Water.

== Reception ==
Blood Red Road received the Children's Book Award in the 2011 Costa Book Awards.

Jennifer M. Brown, the children's editor for the Shelf Awareness website, wrote that Blood Red Road "comes to satisfying completion, but leaves the answer for Saba's next adventures." Publishers Weekly said that Blood Red Road "is elevated above its now familiar postapocalyptic setting by an intriguing prose style and strong narrative voice." Kirkus Reviews wrote that Blood Red Road is a "tale that combines a love story, monsters and sibling rivalry". Jessica Bruder of The New York Times said that the "Scenes are brief, told in a few pages with fast-paced action. And the sentences are economical, dry and tight". MTV's Hollywood Crush wrote that Blood Red Road is "Written in a unique voice, with a beautiful but stark writing style, Blood Red Road is chock full of interesting characters worth caring about, a heroine willing to face just about anything, non-stop action and a surprisingly sweet romance. In many ways it's a simple story told in simple prose—but there is a complexity to this simplicity that makes Blood Red Road a truly remarkable reading experience."

Anthony McGowan's review in The Guardian said of the book "At its worst it is a risible collection of clichés strung together by a barely coherent plot".

== Sequels ==
The second book in the Dust Lands trilogy, Rebel Heart, was released on 30 October 2012. Raging Star was released on 1 May 2014 in the UK and 13 May in the US.
