= Nicholas Bowling =

British speculative fiction writer

- Born: London, England
- Education: Queen's College, Oxford (MA Classical Literature)
- Occupations: Writer, teacher
- Writing career
- Pen name: Nick Newman
- Period: 2017–present
- Genres: Science fiction; historical fantasy; young adult literature
- Website: nicknewman.co.uk

Nicholas Bowling is a British speculative fiction author, who also writes using the pen name Nick Newman. In addition to his writing, he is also a teacher, stand-up comedian and musician. Bowling published six young adult books between 2017 and 2023, and an adult novel, The Garden as Nick Newman in 2025. He was shortlisted for the Costa Book Award for Children's Book in 2019 for his novel, In the Shadow of Heroes.

== Biography ==
Bowling was born in Oxford, England, but relocated to Chester, close to the England–Wales border, when he was four-years-old. As a teenager, he never read much, until an English teacher taught him "to love language and to love reading again". Bowling went to Queen's College, Oxford, where he graduated in 2007 with a Bachelor of Arts in English and Classics. He studied further at Oxford and graduated in 2010 with a Master of Arts in Classical Literature. Bowling became a Classics teacher at Trinity School in Croydon where he taught Latin. Bowling experimented a little with stand-up comedy, performing solo at the Edinburgh festival, and music, recording two EPs and an album, before settling down to writing.

Bowling described his first attempts at writing as a few chapters of "some awful, awful novels". Then, after encouragement from some people, Bowling turned his attention to children's literature, and wrote his first novel, Witch Born, an historical fantasy set in sixteenth-century England about a young lady charged with witchcraft. Between 2017 and 2023, Bowling published four children's books, and two young adult science fiction books. His second novel, In the Shadow of Heroes, was shortlisted for the 2019 Costa Book Award for Children's Book. In 2020, he switched to adult fiction and began work on The Garden, a book about two elderly sisters confined to a garden isolated from the outside world devastated by climate change. It was published in 2025.

== Bibliography ==
=== Novels ===
- Witch Born (The Chicken House, 2017)
- In the Shadow of Heroes (The Chicken House, 2019)
- Alpha Omega (Titan Books, 2020)
- Song of the Far Isles (The Chicken House, 2021)
- The Follower (Titan Books, 2021)
- The Undying of Obedience Wellrest (The Chicken House, 2023)
- The Garden (Doubleday, 2025) as Nick Newman

Source: The Encyclopedia of Science Fiction
