= Jasbinder Bilan =

Indian born British author

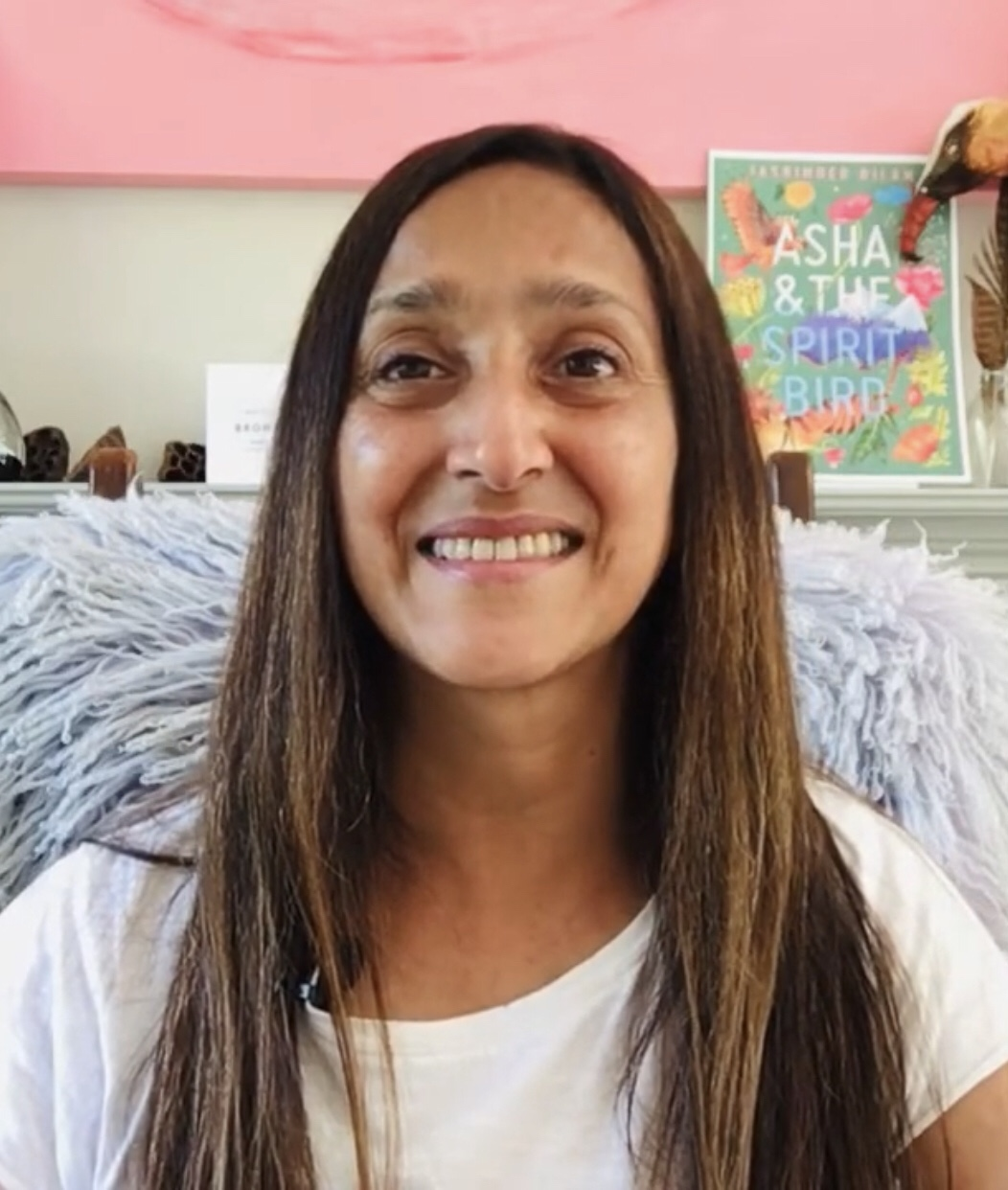
- Bilan in 2022
- Education: Bath Spa University (MA)
- Children: 2
- Website: www.jasbinderbilan.co.uk

Jasbinder Bilan is an Indian-born British author and teacher.

== Early life and education ==
Bilan was born on a farm in the northern Punjab, her mother from Moranwali and her father from Raipur Daba, and moved to Nottingham, England at 18 months old, where she grew up in Lenton and Radford. Bilan graduated with a Master of Arts (MA) in Writing for Young People from Bath Spa University in 2014.

== Personal life ==
Bilan lives near Bath with her husband and their two sons.

== Awards ==
- Costa Book Award for Children's Book in 2019
- The Times/Chicken House Children’s Fiction Competition in 2017
- Finalist for Waterstones Children's Book Prize in Younger Fiction in 2020
- Longlisted for Jhalak Prize in 2020
- Her book Asha & the Spirit Bird was selected as "Children's book of the week" by The Times
