= Diana Hendry =

English author

Diana Lois Hendry (born 2 October 1941) is an English poet, children's author and short story writer. She won a Whitbread Award (later the Costa Prize) in 1991 and was again shortlisted for the prize in 2012.

== Background ==
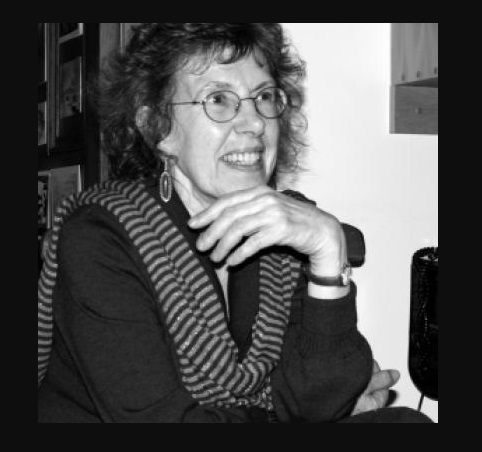
Diana Hendry

Hendry was born in the Wirral, England, one of three children. She worked for a time as a journalist in print and radio, including a post at The Western Mail in Cardiff (1960–65).

She took a degree when she was 39 years old at the University of Bristol. She wrote "As luck would have it my professor's wife was the author Diana Wynne Jones, who saw my writing and suggested a publisher." This began a successful writing career. She taught English at a boys' school and later creative writing at the University of Bristol (1995–97).

Hendry has written over 40 books for children, including Harvey Angell, which won a Whitbread Award in 1991. She won first prize in the 1996 Housman Society Competition for her poetry and was writer in residence at Dumfries and Galloway Royal Infirmary (1997-1998). Her collections of poetry for adults include Making Blue (Peterloo, 1995), Borderers (Peterloo, 2001) and Twelve Lilts: Psalms & Responses (Mariscat Press, 2003) and Late Love: And Other Whodunnits (2008). Her book The Seeing, inspired by her childhood memories of the war, was shortlisted for the Scottish Children's Book Award (2013). She tutors at the Arvon Foundation and writes for The Spectator magazine.

Hendry lives in Edinburgh with her partner Hamish Whyte of Mariscat Press. She has two children and three grandchildren. Her influences include novelist Charles Langbridge Morgan, Albert Camus, Muriel Spark, Elizabeth Bishop and Seamus Heaney. She enjoys yoga and playing the piano.

== Awards and honours ==
- 1976: First prize Stroud International Poetry Competition
- 1985: Short-listed for the Nestlé Smarties Book Prize
- 1993: Second prize Peterloo Poetry Competition 1993
- 1991: Whitbread Award (for children's novel) 1991
- 1996: First prize Housman Society Poetry Competition
- 2001: Scottish Arts Council Children's Book Award
- 2002: Scottish Arts Council Award
- 2007: Robert Louis Stevenson Fellowship (with Hamish Whyte)
- 2008: Fellow at University of Edinburgh, Science and Engineering
- 2009: Fellow at Office of Lifelong Learning, University of Edinburgh
- 2013: Shortlisted for the Costa Book Award
- 2013: Shortlisted for the Scottish Children's Book Award

== Works ==
=== Poetry collections ===
- Making Blue, Peterloo Poets, 1995
- Borderers, Peterloo Poets, 2001
- Twelve Lilts: Psalms & Responses, Mariscat Press 2003
- Sparks! (with Tom Pow), Mariscat Press 2005
- Late Love and Other Whodunnits, Peterloo/Mariscat Press, 2008
- The Seed-Box Lantern: New & Selected Poems 2013

=== Children's fiction: selected ===
- The Very Noisy Night, illustrated by Jane Chapman. Little Tiger Press, 1998
- The Very Busy Day, illustrated by Jane Chapman Little Tiger Press, 2001
- The Very Snowy Christmas, illustrated by Jane Chapman. Little Tiger Press, 2005
- Oodles of Noodles, illustrated by Sarah Massini. Little Tiger Press, 2008
- Harvey Angell, Julia MacRae/Walker Books, 1991; Red Fox, 2003 and 2012
- Harvey Angell and the Ghost Child, MacRae/Red Fox 1997, 2003 and 2012
- Harvey Angell Beats Time, Red Fox, 2003 and 2012
- You Can't Kiss It Better, Red Fox, 2003
- The Seeing, Bodley Head, 2012
