= Walter Leslie Wilmshurst =

Walter Leslie Wilmshurst (22 June 1867 – 10 July 1939) was an English author and Freemason. He published four books on English Freemasonry and submitted articles to The Occult Review magazine.

== Life ==
Born in Chichester, Wilmshurst was initiated as a Mason in the Huddersfield lodge in 1889, having moved to the town to become a solicitor, for a time becoming president of the Huddersfield Law Society. He died in London whilst attending the installation of the Duke of Kent as the Grand Master of the United Lodge of England.

In 1927, he founded the Lodge of Living Stones No.4957, in Leeds, which was set up purely in order to study the more esoteric meaning behind Masonic ritual and symbolism.

== Bibliography ==
=== Books ===
- The Meaning of Masonry (1922)
- The Ceremony of Initiation (1932)
- The Ceremony of Passing
- Notes on Cosmic Consciousness
- Masonic Initiation (1924)

=== Articles and papers ===
- "The Fundamental Philosophic Secrets Within Masonry"
- "Review: 'The Hidden Church of the Holy Graal' by A.E. Waite"
- "The Mystical Basis of Freemasonry"
- "Reason and Vision"
- "The Working Tools of an Old York Master"
- "Spurious Ecstasy and Ceremonial Magic"
- "Book of the Perfect Lodge"
- "Spurious Ecstasy"
- "More Glimpses of Initiation Science"
- "Concerning Cosmic Consciousness"
