= W. J. Corbett =

British children's writer (1938–2003)

William Jesse Corbett (21 February 1938 – 15 February 2003) was an English children's writer. Born and raised in Birmingham, West Midlands, he joined the British Merchant Navy at the age of 16 and later was a physical training instructor in the British Army, among other jobs. He decided to become a writer and wrote The Song of Pentecost, featuring the adventures of a group of mice who travel to a new home. It was published by Methuen in 1982, a 215-page novel with illustrations by Martin Ursell. It was an international bestseller and the 1982 Whitbread Awards Children's Book of the Year. He followed with two sequels and several other books.

Beside the Pentecost trilogy (1982 to 1987), the books by Corbett most widely held in WorldCat libraries are The Ark of the People (1998) and The Quest for the End of the Tail (2000), featuring the tiny Willow People. Those were first two of three 300-page novels published by Hodder Children's Books, sometimes called the Ark of the People series.

Corbett died on 15 February 2003 and two more books were published later that year.
