= The Light in Everything =

2022 middle grade novel by Katya Balen

- Author: Katya Balen
- Publisher: Bloomsbury Publishing
- Publication date: April 1, 2022
- ISBN: 9781526622990

The Light in Everything is a 2022 middle-grade novel by Katya Balen. It was shortlisted for the 2023 Carnegie Medal.

== Plot ==
Tom's mother and Zofia's father are moving in together and having a baby. The children are very unhappy with the situation. Then Tom's mother gets ill and is in danger of losing the baby.

== Reception ==
A review by Emily Bearn in The Telegraph of The Light in Everything states, "One of the challenges in children’s fiction is making difficult subjects palatable, without rendering them bland. Balen triumphs: what unfolds here is a deceptively complex story, in which she explores themes of grief and abandonment through the unfiltered voices of two children on the cusp of adolescence." Carolyn Boyd writes in a review for The School Librarian, "Although the plot is about a blended family, the true centre is people learning to deal with their feelings. Balen's wise, supportive text guides both the characters and the reader through the storms to a safe haven."

A review in The Irish Times states, "The prose is beautiful, the tension blistering: The Light in Everything is a highly recommended read for mature children aged 10+, as well as their adults." In the Irish Independent, Sarah Webb describes October, October as "one of the most extraordinary, immersive children's books I've ever read" and writes, "The Light in Everything is all set to be another lifelong favourite. [...] Her characters are so well drawn you don't read their story, you live it."

== Awards and honors ==
The Light in Everything was shortlisted for the 2023 Carnegie Medal.
