= Out of Shadows =

2010 children's historical novel by Jason Wallace

- Author: Jason Wallace
- Audio read by: Ben Onwukwe
- Language: English
- Genre: Historical fiction
- Set in: Zimbabwe in the 1980s
- Publisher: Andersen Press
- Publication date: 28 January 2010
- Publication place: London
- Media type: Print (paperback), e-book, audiobook
- Pages: 288
- Awards: 2010 Costa Book Award; 2011 Branford Boase Award; 2011 UKLA Book Award
- ISBN: 978-1-84939-048-4
- OCLC: 768655861
- Dewey Decimal: [Fic]
- LC Class: PZ7.W15655 Out 2010

Out of Shadows is a 2010 children's historical novel by Jason Wallace, published by Andersen Press on 28 January 2010. Set in 1980s Zimbabwe, the story follows white teenager Robert Jacklin at a prestigious boarding school as he confronts bullying, anti-black racism, his own morality and the political instability of the time. His debut novel, it is partly inspired by Wallace's own experiences attending a boarding school in Zimbabwe after the civil war. The novel was rejected by publishers one hundred times before being published by Andersen Press. The novel received favourable reviews and won the 2010 Costa Book Award for Children's Book, the 2011 Branford Boase Award and the 2011 UKLA Book Award. It was also shortlisted for the 2010 Booktrust Teenage Prize and the 2011 Carnegie Medal.

== Synopsis ==
In 1983, thirteen-year-old Robert Jacklin arrives from England at Haven School, an elite boys' boarding school in Zimbabwe. He is the son of a British intellectual attached to the British Embassy. Robert befriends Nelson Ndube, one of the few black pupils at the school, but eventually turns to the white elite of the school instead in an effort to find safety and acceptances. Many of the white students, particularly Ivan Hascott, are racist bullies who are still angered that the country's white minority lost power to its black majority after the recent civil war. Robert wrestles with his conscience while becoming drawn into their ideology and practices. Ivan's family has suffered during Robert Mugabe's rise to power, and Ivan pressures Robert into joining his quest for revenge on black Africans. Robert becomes disturbed by Ivan's increasingly violent behavior.

== Background ==
Out of Shadows took one year and six months to complete. Wallace himself attended a boarding school in Zimbabwe shortly after the end of the Rhodesian Bush War/Zimbabwean War of Liberation. While a student there, he wanted to write a story of what he had seen and experienced. The political atmosphere in Zimbabwe was declining and unstable, and inspired Wallace to begin writing fictional stories of his encounters. Though the characters in Out of Shadows are not real, they served to demonstrate the attitudes or personalities "a very few people" were portraying. Wallace notes that he "came up with the idea of "What if...?" and took it from there" when he was writing the novel. There may be many similar aspects of the novel's story may share with Wallace's real life but they are general details and are not very specific.

Out of Shadows was rejected by one hundred literary agents and publishers before being picked up by Andersen Press. The novel was first published in paperback format in the United Kingdom by Andersen Press on 28 January 2010. In April 2011, it was published in the United States by Holiday House (ISBN 978-0-8234-2342-2). It was later translated into Portuguese, Turkish and Spanish.

== Reception ==
In its starred review, Kirkus Reviews called the novel a "first-rate, surprisingly believable thriller" and praised Wallace's "mastery" in portraying race relations in post-war Zimbabwe. Publishers Weekly gave the novel a favourable review, writing, "Racial conflict, corruption, and the cycle of abuse are conveyed with authenticity in this uncomfortable, unvarnished story." In her review for The Times, writer Amanda Craig praised the novel as "something that schools should study and readers read." Writing in the Independent on Sunday, Nicholas Tucker called it an "excellent" novel. Emma Lee-Potter of the Daily Express compared it to Lord of the Flies and wrote that it "could well become a children's classic." Booktrust called it an "expert and disturbing examination of the meaning of morality and of the comprehensive and complex legacy of conflict and injustice."

In his review for The Guardian, author Patrick Ness criticized the novel for its "often unsubtle and occasionally unconvincing" plot as well as the "full psychology" of Robert's journey into and out of Ivan's racist crusade for not being "as nuanced as it really needs to be." Ness nonetheless called the novel "a powerful, devastating read."

== Awards ==
- 2010 Costa Book Award for Children's Book, winner
- 2011 Branford Boase Award, winner
- 2011 UKLA Book Award, winner
- 2010 Booktrust Teenage Prize, shortlist
- 2011 Carnegie Medal, shortlist
