= Jason Wallace =

Author living in South West London

Jason Wallace (born 1969) is an author living in South West London. He is the author of Out of Shadows, the 2010 Costa Children's Book of the Year.

== Early life and education ==
Jason Wallace was born in Cheltenham, Gloucestershire, South West England. He is a descendant of Lord George Sanger, a world-famous Victorian circus owner and an International English cricketer. Wallace is also loosely related (through a marriage in his family tree) to J.R.R. Tolkien. In his younger years, Jason lived in London, England with his family before attending Peterhouse Boys' School, a boarding school in 1983 in Zimbabwe. The family emigrated after his mother remarried. At the age of seventeen, he aspired for a career as an author and was determined despite knowing how that it would be challenging.

Wallace was a fan of comic books such as The Adventures of Tintin and Asterix and authors including Dr.Seuss and Richard Scarry. In his childhood, among his favorite books were James and the Giant Peach and Danny the Champion of the World. In his adolescent and adult life, he was a fan of Stephen King and James Herbert.

His experiences in a Zimbabwean boarding school following the Zimbabwe War of Liberation / Rhodesian Bush War laid the building blocks for his first, Costa Children's Book Award winning, novel, Out of Shadows.

== Career ==
Jason Wallace had a challenging journey to becoming a published author. He stated that "getting published didn't happen overnight, and writing had to become "the other job" for which I didn't get paid while life continued." Wallace says he has "always had a fertile imagination, but as far as I'm concerned, it's the school I need to thank for inadvertently nurturing my will to write through strong discipline".

=== Out of Shadows ===
Out of Shadows was published on 28 January 2010 by Andersen Press. The novel has received extensive recognition (international rights currently sold to the USA, Norway, Turkey, Brazil and France) and has established him as a successful published author.

Out of Shadows took one year and six months to complete. While he attended a boarding school in Zimbabwe shortly after the Rhodesian Bush War/Zimbabwean War of Liberation ended, Jason Wallace wanted to write a story of what he had seen or experienced. The political scene in Zimbabwe was declining and troubled. This inspired Wallace to begin writing fictional stories of what he was encountering. Though the characters in the novel are not real, they served to demonstrate the attitudes or personalities "a very few people" held. Wallace notes that he "came up with the idea of "What if...?" and took it from there" when he was writing Out of Shadows.

Wallace focused on several themes in the novel Out of Shadows such as bullying, racism, politics and morality. The book is written for both adults and a younger audience of 13+.

=== Encounters ===
Jason Wallace's second novel, Encounters, was published on 4 May 2017 by Andersen Press. The novel is set in Zimbabwe, inspired by true events in the 1990s.

== Personal life ==
Wallace currently resides in South West London, England.

== Bibliography ==
- Out of Shadows (2010)
- Encounters (2017)

== Awards ==
- Shortlisted for the Booktrust Teenage Prize 2010
- WINNER of Costa Book Awards, Costa Book Award for Children's Book 2010
  "...a unanimous winner... A stunning debut novel without a false note. Accomplished and powerful, it changes the way you think."
- WINNER of the Branford Boase Award 2011
- Shortlisted for the CILIP Carnegie Medal 2011
- WINNER of the UKLA Children's Book Award 2011
