= Angela Readman =

British poet and short story writer (born 1973)

- Born: Angela Readman; 1973 (age 52–53); Middlesbrough, England, UK
- Occupations: Poet, Author

Angela Readman (born 1973) is a British poet and short story writer.

Her debut story collection Don't Try This at Home was published by And Other Stories in 2015. She won The Rubery Book Prize and was shortlisted in the Edge Hill Short Story Prize. She also writes poetry, and her collection The Book of Tides was published by Nine Arches in 2016. Something Like Breathing, Readman's first novel, was published by And Other Stories in 2019.

== Early life ==
Readman grew up in Middlesbrough, following university in Manchester she relocated to Newcastle upon Tyne to complete a film studies MA. She completed a masters in creative writing at the University of Northumbria in 2000, and won a Waterstones prize for her distinctive poetry and prose.

== Awards ==
Readman won the International Rubery Book Award in 2015 for her book of short stories, Don't Try This at Home. The book was also short listed in The Edge Hill short story prize. Her story "The Keeper of the Jackalopes" won the Costa Short Story Award (2013) and her story Don't Try This At Home was shortlisted for the same competition the previous year. In 2013, Readman won first prize in the Mslexia Women's Poetry Competition, judged by Kathleen Jamie. She won the National Flash Fiction Contest, and the Essex Poetry Prize in 2012. She was placed second in the first Short Story Competition in 2011. She has won New Writing North awards, and won the Ragged Raven longer poems competition. In 2005, she won The Biscuit Poetry competition and publication of a collection Sex with Elvis. In 2016, she won The Mslexia Short Story Prize. In 2018, she came first place in The Antpn Chekhov Award for Short Fiction.

== Work ==
Readman has published three full length collections of poetry (of 60 pages or more) and several shorter collections of work (including the bi-lingual Hard Core, with Finnish poet Tapani Kinnunen, translated into Finnish.) She was involved with The Flesh of the Bear Poetry exchange in 2004, which was a collaboration of Finnish poets and poets from the North East of England, including Bob Beagrie, Andy Willoughby, Esa Hirvonen, and Kalle Niinikangas.

In 2005, she edited Newcastle Stories (for Comma Press) and accepted a post teaching creative writing at the University of Northumbria.

Her work has appeared in various anthologies and magazines, including London Magazine, Staple, Ambit and Mslexia.

On 31 December 2007, Frieda Hughes printed the poem Housewife from the Strip collection in her regular Times newspaper column

== Novels ==
- (2019) Something Like Breathing. And Other Stories, UK. ISBN 9781911508304

== Poetry ==
- Bunny Girls (Nine Arches Press) 2022
- The Book of Tides (Nine Arches Press) 2016
- Strip (Salt Publishing) 2007
- Hard Core (Ek Zuban) 2006
- Sex with Elvis (Biscuit Publishing) 2005
- Colours/Colors (Diamond Twig) 2000
- Unholy Trinity (Iron Press) 2001

== Anthologies ==
- Hallelujah for 50ft Women (Bloodaxe, 2015)
- The Bath Short Story Award Anthology (2015)
- Unthology 5 (Unthanks, 2014)
- Once Upon There Was a Traveller (the Asham award winners anthology; Virago, 2013)
- Root (Iron Press, 2013)
- The Bristol Short Story Prize (2012)
- Unthology 3 (Unthanked Books, 2012)
- The Robin Hood Book (Caparison, 2012)
- Magnetic North (New Writing North, 2005)
- Smelter (Mudfog) 2004
- The Flesh of the Bear (Ek Zuban)
- Under the Bridge (University of Northumbria Press) 2000
