= Hilary McKay =

British writer of children's books (born 1959)

Hilary McKay (born 12 June 1959) is a British writer of children's books. For her first novel, The Exiles, she won the 1992 Guardian Children's Fiction Prize, a once-in-a-lifetime book award judged by a panel of British children's writers.

== Biography ==
McKay was born in Boston, Lincolnshire, the eldest of four daughters. She studied English, Zoology and Botany at St Andrews University before becoming a public protection scientist. She currently resides in Derbyshire with her husband, Kevin.

McKay says of herself as a child "I anaesthetised myself against the big bad world with large doses of literature. The local library was as familiar to me as my own home."

== Casson Family books ==
The Casson Family series comprises the Whitbread Award-winning Saffy's Angel (2001) and four sequels: Indigo's Star (2004), Permanent Rose (2005), which was shortlisted for the 2005 Whitbread awards, Caddy Ever After (2006), Forever Rose (2007), and prequel Caddy's World (2011). The series focuses on an English family of artists, the Cassons. The first three books are written in the third person but focus on the point of view of the character in the title, whilst Caddy Ever After is written in the first person and is narrated by each of the children in turn, and Forever Rose is written in the first person.

== Porridge Hall books ==
The Porridge Hall series (1994-1998) features Robin Brogan and his mother, who live in Porridge Hall on the Yorkshire coast. Once Porridge Hall was Mrs Brogan's family home, now it has been split into two houses, and she and Robin live in one half, from which Mrs Brogan also runs a bed and breakfast. The Robinson family live in the other half, and the two families are firm friends.

The books have been published as audiobooks, with the first two read by Nigel Lambert, The Amber Cat also by Ron Keith, and Dolphin Luck by Judy Bennett. Dog Friday has been adapted into a German film, Ein Hund namens Freitag. Besides German, the trilogy has been translated into Dutch and Estonian, and Dog Friday has also been translated into Czech, Danish, Greek, Polish, Spanish, and Thai, and The Amber Cat into French.

== Awards ==
- The Exiles won the 1992 Guardian Children's Fiction Prize
- The Exiles At Home won the 1994 Nestlé Smarties Book Prize in ages category 9–11 years and overall
- Saffy's Angel won the 2002 Whitbread Children's Book Award
- Permanent Rose was shortlisted for the 2005 Whitbread Award
- The Skylarks' War (2018) won the 2019 Costa Children's Book Award

== Selected works ==
- The Time of Green Magic
- The Skylarks' War
- Straw into Gold: Hilary McKay's Fairy Tales

=== Binny ===
1. Binny for Short
2. Binny in Secret
3. Binny Bewitched

=== Casson Family ===
1. Saffy's Angel
2. Indigo's Star
3. Permanent Rose
4. Caddy Ever After
5. Forever Rose
6. Caddy's World (takes place before Saffy's Angel)

=== Exiles ===
1. The Exiles
2. The Exiles At Home
3. The Exiles In Love

=== Paradise House ===
1. The Treasure in the Garden
2. The Echo in the Chimney
3. The Zoo in the Attic
4. The Magic in the Mirror
5. The Surprise Party
6. Keeping Cottontail

=== Porridge Hall ===
1. Dog Friday
2. The Amber Cat
3. Dolphin Luck

=== Pudding Bag School ===
1. A Birthday Wish
2. Cold Enough for Snow
3. A Strong Smell of Magic

=== For younger readers ===
- The Story of Bear
- Happy and Glorious
- Practically Perfect
- Charlie and the Great Escape
