= Katya Balen =

British author (born 1989)

- Born: 1989 (age 36–37) London, England
- Genre: Children's literature
- Notable works: The Space We're In; October, October; The Light in Everything; The Thames and Tide Club
- Notable awards: Carnegie Medal (2022)

Katya Balen (born 1989) is a British author of children's literature. Her works include The Space We're In (2019), The Light in Everything (2022), and The Thames and Tide Club (2023). Her 2020 novel October, October won the 2022 Carnegie Medal.

== Biography ==
Balen was born 1989 in London.

She studied English at university, and for her Master's thesis, she explored "the effects texts have on the behavior of autistic children." Aside from writing, Balen co-founded Mainspring Arts, "a charity that uses creativity to work with autistic people."

== Critical reception ==
=== The Space We're In ===
In a review of The Space We're In, Publishers Weekly writes, "Balen, who has worked with autistic people in various settings, sensitively depicts the experience of love, and of loving a neurodiverse family member." Kirkus Reviews describes The Space We're In as "The mysteries of the universe, the complexities of life, and a protagonist readers will fall in love with."

Jill Baetiong recommends the book "for libraries with a strong interest in realistic fiction" in a review for School Library Journal and writes, "While this depiction of a boy with an autistic brother is evocative, some readers may be tired of another novel that views an autistic character through the perspective of a put-upon neurotypical sibling." In a review for the Bulletin of the Center for Children's Books, Quinita Balderson describes the book as "a gut-wrenching story of loss, but through Frank's growing bond with Max it's also one of gain, and readers will be deeply moved."

A review by Stitch Byrne in The Week notes "Balen has added to Frank's compelling voice the attractions of short chapters, each beginning with a coded message, and anything-but-childish illustrations to create the perfect book to appeal to readers who may hitherto have been put off by weightier and less heartrending (and heartwarming) novels."

=== October, October ===
October, October was named one of the 50 best children's books of the year by the Irish Independent in 2021 and described as a "modern classic in the making about a girl who lives in the wild with her dad." The book was also named a Children's Book of the Week by The Times in September 2020. A review by Clare Morpurgo in The School Librarian describes the book as "a rich gift, to be read slowly and enjoyed for as long as possible."

=== The Light in Everything ===
A review by Emily Bearn in The Telegraph of The Light in Everything states, "One of the challenges in children’s fiction is making difficult subjects palatable, without rendering them bland. Balen triumphs: what unfolds here is a deceptively complex story, in which she explores themes of grief and abandonment through the unfiltered voices of two children on the cusp of adolescence." Carolyn Boyd writes in a review for The School Librarian, "Although the plot is about a blended family, the true centre is people learning to deal with their feelings. Balen's wise, supportive text guides both the characters and the reader through the storms to a safe haven."

A review in The Irish Times states, "The prose is beautiful, the tension blistering: The Light in Everything is a highly recommended read for mature children aged 10+, as well as their adults." In the Irish Independent, Sarah Webb describes October, October as "one of the most extraordinary, immersive children's books I've ever read" and writes, "The Light in Everything is all set to be another lifelong favourite. [...] Her characters are so well drawn you don't read their story, you live it."

=== The Thames and Tide Club ===
Emily Bearn also reviewed The Thames and Tide Club for The Telegraph, writing, "There is a gentle, but never overbearing, moral about protecting the environment; and the combination of short, suspenseful chapters and engaging illustrations by Rachael Dean make this a book that even the less confident readers are likely to enjoy." The book was named a Children's Book of the Week by The Times in April 2023, and described in a review by Ruth Concannon for the Irish Examiner as a "quirky tale that will be particularly enjoyed by anyone who appreciates a good, fish-themed pun."

== Awards and honours ==
The Space We're In is a Junior Library Guild book.

Awards for Balen's writing
Year	Title	Award	Result	Ref.
2020	The Space We're In	Branford Boase Award	Shortlist	
2020	The Space We're In	Carnegie Medal	Longlist	
2022	October, October	Carnegie Medal	Winner	
2022	October, October	Wainwright Prize for Children's Writing on Nature and Conservation	Highly commended	
2023	The Light in Everything	Carnegie Medal	Shortlist	
2026	Ghostlines	Carnegie Medal	Shortlist	

== Publications ==
- The Space We're In, illustrated by Laura Carlin (2019)
- October, October, illustrated by Angela Harding (2020)
- Maggie and the Moonbird (2021)
- Birdsong, illustrated by Richard Johnson (2022)
- The Light in Everything (2022)
- Nightjar, illustrated by Richard Johnson (2023)
- The Thames and Tide Club: The Secret City, illustrated by Rachael Dean (2023)
- Ghostlines (2025)
