= Saffy's Angel =

First novel in the Casson Family series written by Hilary McKay

- First edition (UK)
- Author: Hilary McKay
- Illustrator: Liselotte Watkins (UK)
- Language: English
- Series: Casson Family
- Genre: Novel
- Published: 2001
- Publisher: Hodder & Stoughton (UK); Margaret K. McElderry Books (US)
- Publication place: United Kingdom
- Media type: Print
- Pages: 224 pp
- Followed by: Indigo's Star

Saffy's Angel is the first novel in the Casson Family series written by Hilary McKay. The book is written about a family and their respective lives. It has been translated into Catalan, Chinese, Danish, Dutch, Estonian, Finnish, French, German, Greek, Hebrew, Italian, Japanese, Korean, Lithuanian, Polish, Portuguese (twice), Romanian, Serbian, Slovenian, Spanish, and Swedish. It has also been published as an audiobook narrated by Julia Sawalha, which has won the AudioFile Earphones Award. An audiobook abridged by Peter Mackie has been read by Debra Gillett.

== Plot summary ==
Eve Casson is an artist with four children, each of whom she named after different colors: Cadmium (“Caddy”), Saffron (“Saffy”), Indigo, and Rose. The novel begins with Saffron searching through the color chart pinned up in her house, looking for her name, Saffron. While Saffron searches, the health visitor is checking up on Rose, her new sister. The health visitor then discovers Rose has been sucking Caddy's paint tubes and threatens to take Rose to Casualty. When she can’t find her name on the color chart, Saffron finds out that she was adopted by Bill and Eve after Saffron's mother, who is Eve's sister, was killed in a car crash. Saffron becomes deeply upset, despite being comforted by her family. The story fast forwards to when Rose is 6 years old. Rose starts school (a year late according to the health visitor) and draws her first picture, which her teacher pastes to the wall. Rose is very upset and persuades Indigo to steal her picture and Caddy to draw an identical one to go up on the wall instead. Rose, Indigo, Saffron and Caddy's grandfather visits and Caddy has another disastrous driving lesson and tells her driving instructor, Michael about failing all her exams.

Soon after their grandfather visits, he dies and leaves something to each of the children. For Cadmium, his property in Wales. For Indigo, his car. For Saffron, his angel in the garden. And for Rose, his money. After the will is read, Bill heads back down to London and while running after him, Saffron meets Sarah, a girl who lives in the same road as her who uses a wheelchair. Caddy has another lesson, meanwhile Saffron goes round to Sarah's house and meets her mother, Mrs Warbeck, the headmistress of the private school. Sarah begins the idea of visiting Siena, where Saffron believes the stone angel is. Sarah persuades her mother and father to take her to Siena during the term, and Sarah's mother begins to trust the two friends, and lets them go into town together. They meet up with some girls their age who all have their noses pierced. Sarah wants one, too, and persuades Saffron to get one done. When Sarah's mother finds out Sarah is in much trouble, but Saffron's nose ring is admired by her family.

Soon after, Caddy scatters her revision books across the house, in order to revise everywhere and to beat her. Sarah perfects her plan to smuggle Saffron into Siena in her car and Saffron is forced to agree by her sisters and brother. Caddy passes her written driving test and Saffron heads off to Siena with Sarah's family. When they arrive at Siena, Sarah's family having found out three-quarters of the way there, Mrs Warbeck, Sarah and Saffron set off to find the stone angel. They discover a locked door and go back very disappointed.

Saffron makes a call home and talks to her mother. Caddy is still revising to beat Michael's girlfriend, Rose is doing her art and Indigo is conquering more fears of his. Saffron and Sarah try again and again, until on the last day they find Saffron's ex-neighbour. The neighbour tells Saffron that her grandfather took the stone angel away long ago, when he took Saffron. Meanwhile, Caddy takes her driving test. Rose and Indigo decide to look in the Banana House for Saffy's angel.

Caddy is very disappointed to find she passed her driving test, because she can't have driving lessons with Michael anymore. However, Indigo and Rose persuade Caddy to drive to Wales to find Saffy's angel, Indigo's car and Caddy's house after Indigo has a brainwave. On the way there, Rose holds up lots of signs to make up for Caddy's nervous driving. When they arrive in Wales, they find barbed wire around Caddy's house with a large 'Keep Out' sign plastered on. But, they climb over and find Indigo's wrecked car with a chest in the back, nailed tightly shut. They return home to find Saffy and Sarah back from Siena.

Bill also has arrived home, and has to have everything explained to him by Saffron and the rest of the family. Bill opens the box and finds Saffy's stone angel in pieces. Saffron is delighted to have found the box. Caddy is going to university in London, after passing all of her exams. Before Caddy goes, however, Caddy finds the perfect resin and paint, to stick Saffy's angel back together right before she leaves.

Saffy finds out that she belongs in the Casson family and there is no place like home.

== Characters ==
- Saffron Casson - the main character of the story. Saffron is the second oldest of the four children. She is actually Indigo, Rose and Caddy's cousin. Saffron befriends Sarah at the start of the novel, and by the end of the book, Sarah is part of the family. She wants to find her angel.
- Indigo Casson - the only boy of the Casson family. Indigo takes to cooking odd things for the family whenever Eve has forgotten to buy the food. Indigo has dreams of becoming an Arctic explorer but has to conquer his fear of heights.
- Rose Casson - the youngest of the Casson family. Rose is fabulous at art and knows just how to manage her parents.
- Cadmium Casson - the oldest out of the Casson children. Caddy is on her 96th driving lesson and is madly in love with her gorgeous driving instructor.
- Eve Casson - the mother of the Casson family. Eve often spends nights in her garden shed, drawing pictures for anybody who wants them. Eve is a very forgetful person, and gets lost in her art. She is always worried about her children when they are out.
- Bill Casson - the father of the Casson family. Bill is exactly what the other members of his family are not. Stylish, cool and calm. Bill, most of the time, lives in his immaculate studio in London, free of any messy children.
- Sarah Warbeck - the wheelchair-using neighbour, who Saffron and her family have ignored throughout their life at the Banana House. Sarah meets Saffron and they quickly become best friends. Sarah attends the local private school, of which her mother is headmistress. Sarah is persuasive and knows just how to manipulate her parents.
- Michael - Caddy's driving instructor. To persuade Caddy to learn how to drive properly, Michael invents a girlfriend called Diane (Droopy Di). However, in the books, after Michael and Caddy admit they love each other properly, and he proposes to Caddy.

== Awards ==
- 2002 Whitbread Children's Book of the Year
- Boston Globe-Horn Book Honor Book
- ALA Notable Book
- School Library Journal Best Book of 2002
