= Journal of Research in Reading =

- Discipline: Psychology Education and Educational Research
- Language: English

Publication details
- History: 1978–present
- Publisher: Wiley-Blackwell on behalf of the UKLA.
- Frequency: Quarterly
- Impact factor: 2.6 (2020)

Standard abbreviations
- ISO 4: J. Res. Read.

Indexing
- ISSN: 0141-0423 (print); 1467-9817 (web)

Links
- Journal homepage; Online access; Online archive

Journal of Research in Reading is a quarterly peer-reviewed academic journal published by Wiley-Blackwell on behalf of the UKLA. The journal was established in 1978. The Journal of Research in Reading publishes papers on topics such as the history and development of literacy, policy and strategy for literacy, and the learning, teaching and use of literacy in different contexts. This research encompasses fields such as anthropology, cultural studies, education, language and linguistics and philosophy among others.

According to the Journal Citation Reports, the journal has a 2011 impact factor of 1.25, ranking it 23rd out of 51 journals in the category "Psychology Educational" and 38th out of 206 in the category "Education & Educational Research".
