= Moira Young =

Canadian children's novelist

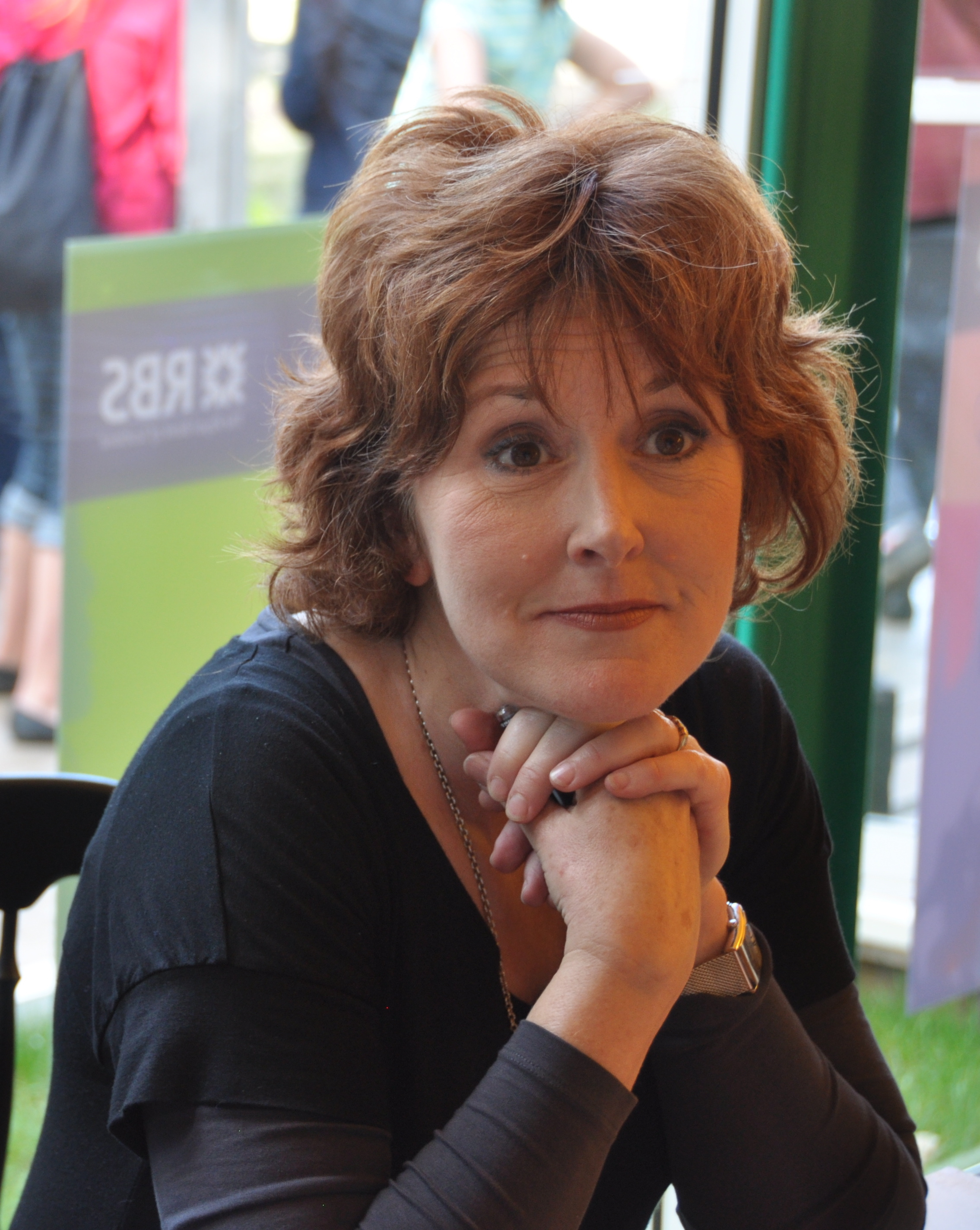
- Young in August 2011
- Born: 1959 (age 66–67); Canada
- Occupation: Novelist
- Writing career
- Language: English
- Genres: Fantasy, science fiction
- Notable work: Blood Red Road
- Website: moirayoung.com

Moira Young (born 1959) is a Canadian children's novelist. Young was born in New Westminster, British Columbia.

== Awards ==
Awards for Young's writing
Year	Title	Award	Result	Ref.
2011	Blood Red Road	Costa Book Award for Children's Book	Winner	
2011	Blood Red Road	Cybils Award for Young Adult Speculative Fiction	Winner	
2012	Blood Red Road	ALA Best Fiction for Young Adults	Selection	
2013	Rebel Heart	Sunburst Award for Excellence in Canadian Literature of the Fantastic: Young Adult	Finalist	
2015	Raging Star	Amazing Audiobooks for Young Adults	Selection	

== Publications ==
=== Standalone books ===
- The Road to Ever After (2016)

=== Dust Lands trilogy ===
1. Blood Red Road (2011)
2. Rebel Heart (2012)
3. Raging Star (2014)
