= Brian Conaghan =

Scottish author

Brian Conaghan (born 6 October 1971) is a Scottish author, based in Coatbridge. He is best known for his books The Boy Who Made It Rain (2011), When Mr Dog Bites (2014), The Bombs That Brought Us Together (2016), and We Come Apart (2017), (co-authored with Sarah Crossan). When Mr Dog Bites, a book about a teenage boy with Tourette's, was shortlisted for both Children's Books Ireland and the Carnegie Medal in 2015. The Bombs That Brought Us Together won the Costa Book Award for Children's Book in 2016. Treacle Town was shortlisted for the 2025 Carnegie Medal for Writing.
