= Set in Stone (novel) =

Children's fantasy novel written by Linda Newbery

- First edition cover
- Author: Linda Newbery
- Language: English
- Genre: Fantasy
- Publisher: David Fickling Books
- Publication place: United Kingdom
- Pages: 357
- ISBN: 978-0-385-75103-2
- OCLC: 61131736

Set in Stone is a children's fantasy novel written by Linda Newbery. It received the Costa Children's Book of the Year Prize for 2006, and was nominated for the 2007 Carnegie Medal.

== Plot summary ==
Samuel Godwin, an aspiring artist, is forced to drop out of art school following his father's death. Without any qualifications, he contemplates what to do for work. Wealthy businessman Ernest Farrow advertises for an art tutor for his two daughters, and Godwin successfully applies for the position.

He moves into Farrow's mansion, Fourwinds, with adequate time to pursue his own art. Godwin becomes infatuated with Farrow's youngest daughter, Marianne, but questions remain unanswered. Marianne wanders the grounds at night, while her sister, Juliana, is always quiet and sad. Godwin discovers the previous art tutor, a talented sculptor, was sent away from Fourwinds before he finished his masterpiece.

== Major themes ==
Although written as a children's book and nominated in awards categories for eight- to fourteen-year-olds, critics have said that it should not be read by under fourteen-year-olds due to the themes of incest in the book. The author, Linda Newbery, considers the book to be young adult fiction rather than specifically for children.

The novel is set in 19th-century England, influenced by Wilkie Collins and Charlotte Brontë, with hints of Victorian gothic. The book alternates between the point of view of two different characters, in alternating chapters.

== Reception ==
Norah Piehl reviewed the book for TeenReads.com. She described the plot as "sensational" which "will keep readers wide awake and shivering late into the night". Two children who read the book on behalf of the BBC One's Newsround Press Pack whilst on the Costa Book Awards panel did not like the book compared to others on the shortlist. One did not think it was his type of book, while the other preferred a different shortlisted book, The Diamond of Drury Lane.

== Awards and nominations ==
Set in Stone won the 2006 Costa Book Awards prize for Best Children's Book. The other shortlisted books were David Almond's Clay, Julia Golding's The Diamond of Drury Lane and Meg Rosoff's Just in Case. Following that win, the book was placed on the shortlist for Book of the Year, but that ultimately went to Stef Penney's The Tenderness of Wolves which had qualified for the list by winning the First Novel award. The novel was also nominated for the 2007 Carnegie Medal.
