= Fanny Kemble Johnson =

American poet

- Born: May 22, 1868; Rockbridge County, Virginia
- Died: February 15, 1950 (aged 81); Charleston, West Virginia
- Other names: Fanny Costello
- Occupations: writer, poet
- Known for: The Strange-Looking Man

Fanny Kemble Johnson (May 22, 1868 – February 15, 1950) was an author, poet and essayist from West Virginia. She wrote one novel, The Beloved Son, in 1916. Her short stories and poetry appeared in literary magazines such as Atlantic Monthly, Harper's, and Century but also in places such as Weird Tales. Her story The Strange-Looking Man was first included in The Pagan and then selected for Best American Short Stories by E. J. O'Brien in 1917. Her story They Both Needed It was chosen as one of the best short stories of 1918. Johnson was selected as the poet laureate of the Conservative Party of Amateurdom by the National Amateur Press Association in 1889 calling her "the greatest poet in Amateur Journalism".

The Strange Looking Man was included in an Oxford University Press anthology Women’s Writing on the First World War. The story is considered to be first short story about World War I to be selected for the Best American Short Stories collection. The story is a fable about a child who considers a non-disfigured man "strange" because all the child has ever known was maimed and injured individuals.

== Personal life ==
Johnson was married to Vincent Costello. She and her husband moved from Charleston to Wheeling in 1907, and back to Charleston in 1917. They had four children.
