= Love and Summer =

2010 novel by William Trevor

- First edition (UK)
- Author: William Trevor
- Language: English
- Genre: Novel
- Publisher: Viking Press
- Publication date: 2009
- Publication place: Ireland
- Media type: Print (Hardcover & Paperback)
- Pages: 212 pp.
- ISBN: 978-0-670-91824-9
- Preceded by: The Story of Lucy Gault

Love and Summer is a 2009 novel written by William Trevor. It was long-listed for the Booker Prize. The story takes place in the fictitious town of Rathmoye in Ireland during the 1950s. It concerns the illicit love between a photographer and the young married wife of a farmer.

== Plot summary ==
Ellie and her farmer husband Dillahan live a quiet life near the town of Rathmoye. She is a foundling who was raised in an orphanage by Catholic nuns and is the second wife of Dillahan, who earlier had killed his first wife and child in an accident.

During the funeral of Mrs Connulty at Rathmoye a stranger, Florian Kilderry, asks Ellie for direction to the burned down cinema, and their brief conversation is noticed by Miss Connulty, Mrs Connulty's spinster daughter, who determines that the two have struck out a love relationship based on this tenuous encounter. Florian, a photographer, and Ellie begin to notice each other and soon a love affair spanning the languid summer takes place, as the couple remember their lives lived up to that point.
