= My House in Umbria =

2003 television film by Richard Loncraine

- Original theatrical poster
- Genre: Drama; Mystery; Romance; Thriller
- Based on: My House in Umbria by William Trevor
- Screenplay by: Hugh Whitemore
- Directed by: Richard Loncraine
- Starring: Maggie Smith; Ronnie Barker; Chris Cooper; Timothy Spall; Giancarlo Giannini; Benno Fürmann
- Music by: Claudio Capponi
- Country of origin: United States
- Original language: English

Production
- Executive producers: Robert Allan Ackerman; Frank Doelger
- Producer: Ann Wingate
- Cinematography: Marco Pontecorvo
- Editor: Humphrey Dixon
- Running time: 109 minutes
- Production companies: HBO Films; Canine Films; Panorama Films

Original release
- Network: HBO
- Release: May 25, 2003

My House in Umbria is a 2003 British-Italian made-for-television drama mystery film directed by Richard Loncraine. Loosely based on William Trevor's 1991 novella of the same name, published alongside another novella in the collection Two Lives, the film stars Maggie Smith as Emily Delahunty, a flamboyant English romance novelist living in Umbria. After surviving a terrorist bombing aboard a train, Emily invites several fellow survivors to recuperate at her home, including Aimee, a young American girl orphaned in the attack, to whom she becomes particularly attached.

The film received mixed reviews from critics, with Smith's performance consistently praised for its restrained and sympathetic portrayal, while critics also highlighted its visual style and themes of recovery and emotional healing but criticized its slow pace and conventional storytelling. My House in Umbria received numerous award nominations, including at the Golden Globe Awards, Directors Guild of America, and Satellite Awards. Smith won the Primetime Emmy Award for Outstanding Lead Actress in a Miniseries or a Movie, while the film also won the Producers Guild of America Award for Best Long-Form Television.

== Plot ==
Emily Delahunty is an eccentric British romance novelist who lives in Umbria, Italy, where she runs a small pensione with the help of her manager, Quinty. Having fled a traumatic past, she has constructed an idealized life for herself through her novels and her secluded home.

While traveling to Milan on a shopping trip, Emily survives a terrorist bombing aboard her train. After recovering in hospital, she invites three fellow survivors to recuperate at her villa: a retired British Army officer known as the General, a young German photographer named Werner, and Aimee, an American girl whose parents were killed in the attack. Aimee has been rendered mute by the trauma, while the General has lost his daughter and Werner has suffered severe injuries and lost his girlfriend.

As the survivors recover, Inspector Girotti investigates the bombing. Under Emily's care, Aimee gradually begins to speak again, and the group forms an unlikely family. Their fragile peace is threatened when Aimee's uncle, Thomas Riversmith, a university professor from the United States, arrives to take her home. Although Thomas and his wife have little experience raising children, they intend to care for Aimee themselves. Emily, who has grown deeply attached to the girl, tries to persuade Thomas to leave her in Italy.

Flashbacks reveal the traumatic experiences that shaped Emily's life. Orphaned as a child, she was abused by her adoptive father and later left England with a traveling salesman, eventually living as a prostitute before Quinty helped her establish a new life in Italy. Her relationship with Aimee allows Emily to confront aspects of her past that she has long avoided.

Meanwhile, Inspector Girotti discovers evidence linking Werner to the terrorist attack. Emily reluctantly reaches the same conclusion, but Werner secretly leaves the villa before he can be confronted. Despite the revelation, Emily's life takes a hopeful turn. The General decides to remain in Umbria, while Thomas ultimately agrees to let Aimee stay with Emily. Having formed a new family among the survivors, Emily embraces her changed circumstances and finds a measure of peace with her past.

== Cast ==
- Maggie Smith as Mrs. Emily Delahunty
- Ronnie Barker as The General
- Chris Cooper as Thomas Riversmith
- Benno Fürmann as Werner
- Giancarlo Giannini as Inspector Girotti
- Timothy Spall as Quinty
- Libero De Rienzo as Dr. Innocenti
- Emmy Clarke as Aimee
- Cecilia Dazzi as Rosa Crevelli
- Anna Longhi as Signora Bardini
- Deirdre Harrison as Phyllis
- Silvia De Santis as Madeleine
- Alison Adam as The General's daughter
- Lynn Swanson as Francine Riversmith
- Taddeo Harbutt as young General
- Anna Orso as Woman in Siena

== Production ==
=== Pre-production and development ===
The film was developed for American cable television network HBO and produced as a British-Italian co-production by Canine Films and Panorama Films in association with HBO Films. Anne Wingate served as producer, with Frank Doelger and Robert Allan Ackerman as executive producers and Marco Valerio Pugini as co-producer. Richard Loncraine was attached to direct, while Hugh Whitemore wrote the screenplay, adapting William Trevor's 1991 novella of the same name. Loncraine and Whitemore had previously collaborated on the 2002 BBC/HBO television film The Gathering Storm (2002), for which Whitemore received the Emmy Award for Outstanding Writing for a Movie. While retaining the novella’s central premise, Loncraine and Whitemore’s adaptation took greater liberties with the source material, introducing a number of changes and departures from the original.

As with Whitemore, My House in Umbria reunited Loncraine with several members of The Gathering Storm's production team, including production designer Luciana Arrighi and casting director Irene Lamb. The film also assembled an experienced international crew, with Christina Onori serving as art director and Alessandra Querzola as set decorator, while several members of the team would go on to collaborate with Loncraine on later projects. Nicoletta Ercole designed the costumes, Marco Pontecorvo served as director of photography, Humphrey Dixon edited the film, and Claudio Capponi composed the score. Sergio Ercolessi served as first assistant director, with David Stephenson overseeing sound and Daniel Acon and Angus Bickerton supervising special and visual effects, respectively.

=== Filming and locations ===
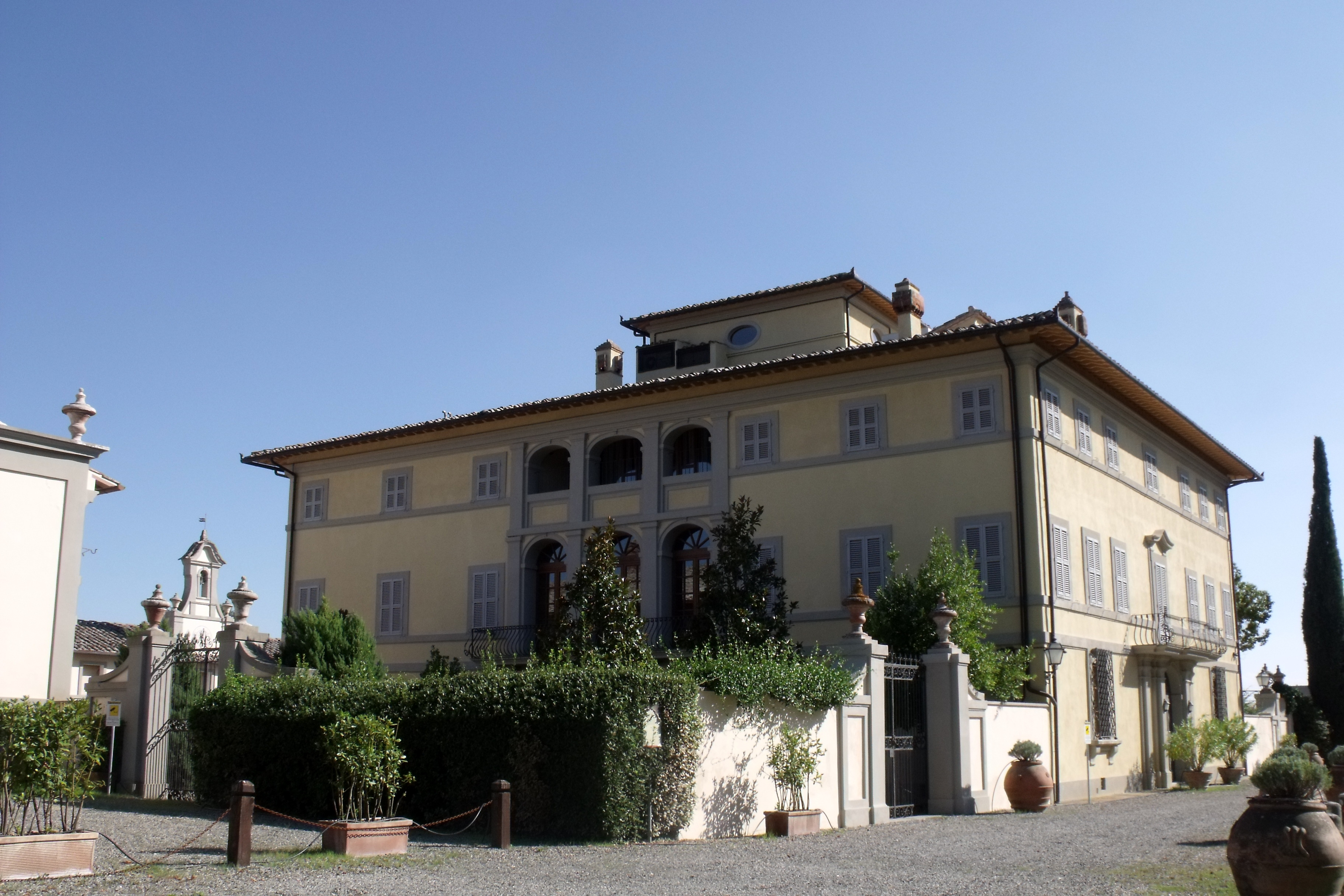
Villa Arceno, situated in the Province of Siena, Tuscany, served as the main filming location for My House in Umbria.

My House in Umbria was filmed in 2002, primarily on location in Italy, with additional studio filming in Italy and the United Kingdom. The film's visual design presented several logistical challenges for Loncraine and his team, particularly because the Italian landscape had changed considerably in the years since the period in which Trevor's novella is set. Although the novella does not specify a precise year, its events take place in an earlier, unspecified period, preceding the film's production by more than a decade. The production therefore sought locations that retained the architectural, agricultural, and natural features associated with the Italy depicted in the novella, while also incorporating elements of visual reconstruction where existing locations no longer corresponded to its appearance. Loncraine described this process as an effort to recreate "an Italy that is perhaps no longer there."

Although the film is set in Umbria, a region of central Italy, much of it was shot elsewhere in the country. Many scenes depicting Delahunty's villa, the film's principal setting, were filmed at Villa Arceno, a historic estate situated south of San Gusmè, a hamlet of Castelnuovo Berardenga in the Province of Siena, Tuscany. The former private estate dates back to the 17th century and was owned by a consortium at the time of filming. Other Italian locations included the old town of Siena; San Casciano in Val di Pesa, in the Metropolitan City of Florence; the now-defunct Stazione di Allumiere in the province of Rome, Lazio; the medieval village of Calcata in the province of Viterbo; and the forecourt of the basilica of Santi Pietro e Paolo a Via Ostiense in Rome. Studio filming took place at Cinecittà studios in Rome, as well as Shepperton Studios and Twickenham Film Studios in London, where reshoots and sequences depicting the dream scenes, which take place outside Italy, were primarily filmed.

== Reception ==
=== Commercial performance ===
My House in Umbria premiered at the Santa Barbara International Film Festival on March 12, 2003, where it was screened as part of the festival's Journey to Italy program. In North America, the film bypassed a traditional theatrical release and instead premiered on HBO on May 25, 2003. Its initial HBO broadcast attracted approximately 3 million viewers, according to The New York Times. Although a strong audience for a television film, the figure was lower than the ratings achieved by several other recent HBO original productions, including And Starring Pancho Villa as Himself (3.4 million), Normal (3.1 million), and Hysterical Blindness (5.5 million), as well as Mike Nichols' miniseries Angels in America ( 4.2 million).

Following its television success, My House in Umbria received limited theatrical distribution in several international markets, primarily through independent and specialized art-house cinemas. In Australia and New Zealand, the film was distributed by Hopscotch Films; in the United Kingdom, by Universal Pictures UK; in Germany, by Concorde Filmverleih; and in Italy, by Mikado Film. These international theatrical releases were secondary to the film’s original television distribution through HBO and were generally handled as limited, specialized engagements rather than wide commercial releases. Despite its limited theatrical exposure, the film grossed approximately $1.32 million worldwide. In New Zealand, My House in Umbria earned $609,510 during its theatrical run, reaching a peak of fifth place on the weekly box-office chart.

=== Critical response ===
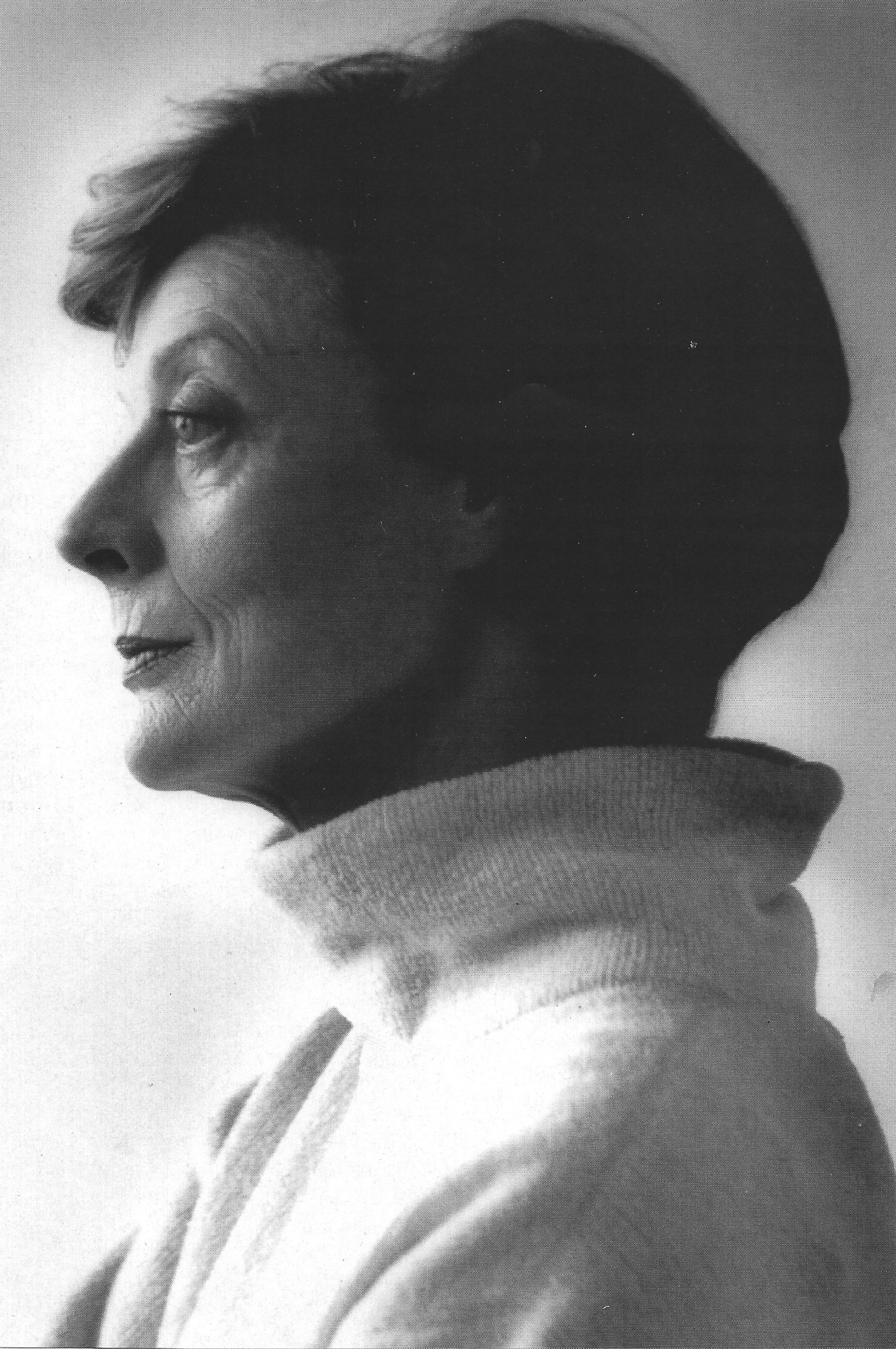
Maggie Smith's performance was widely praised by critics and earned her the Primetime Emmy Award for Outstanding Lead Actress.

Critics gave My House in Umbria a generally favorable reception, with Maggie Smith's performance as Emily Delahunty being the most consistently praised aspect. On the review aggregator website Rotten Tomatoes, the film holds an approval rating of 50% based on six reviews. Apart from Smith's performance, several crtitics also praised the film's visual and emotional qualities. Lael Loewenstein of Variety called it a "superb adaptation" that was "visually lush and dramatically poignant," while David Wiegand from The San Francisco Chronicle described it as a "lovely adaptation" and praised Smith's "magnificent and uncharacteristically restrained performance." Writing for New York magazine, John Leonard similarly praised Smith's ability to make Emily's idealized worldview sympathetic, while highlighting the film's emphasis on character and emotional recovery. Josh Friedman of The Los Angeles Times described Smith's performance as "touching" and praised the film's portrayal of the survivors finding "solace and friendship." The Independent's Anthony Quinn praised the film as "tastefully made."

Other critics found the film's leisurely pace and lack of narrative momentum less successful. Time Out called it a "pretty moderate cable movie" that "trundles along pleasantly enough," while Alessandra Stanley of The New York Times described it as a "leisurely paced psychological thriller" whose "appeal [...] is elusive". Philip French of The Observer praised Smith but said the film began "with a bang" before continuing "with an extended whimper." Anna Smith of Empire similarly praised the Italian setting and Smith's performance but criticized the film as "rather sluggishly told." The most negative responses focused on the film's restrained style and conventional storytelling, with Neil Smith of the BBC describing it as "another tediously tasteful vehicle" for Smith. He found it "so airless and mannered that the end result is stultifying." Peter Bradshaw from The Guardian called it "another genteel diversion," criticizing it as "a bit soppy, a bit soggy" and concluding that "nothing really clicks and the ending is very feeble." Evening Standard's Derek Malcolm argued that Smith was "the only reason to see it," criticizing Loncraine's direction and the screenplay as "blandly gooey."

=== Accolades ===
Year	Award	Category	Nominee(s)	Result	Ref.
2003	Online Film & Television Association Awards	Best Motion Picture Made for Television		Nominated	
2003	Online Film & Television Association Awards	Best Actress in a Motion Picture or Miniseries	Maggie Smith	Nominated	
2003	Online Film & Television Association Awards	Best Supporting Actor in a Motion Picture or Miniseries	Chris Cooper	Nominated	
2003	Online Film & Television Association Awards	Best Ensemble in a Motion Picture or Miniseries		Nominated	
2003	Online Film & Television Association Awards	Best Direction of a Motion Picture or Miniseries	Richard Loncraine	Nominated	
2003	Online Film & Television Association Awards	Best Writing of a Motion Picture or Miniseries	Hugh Whitemore	Nominated	
2003	Online Film & Television Association Awards	Best Costume Design in a Motion Picture or Miniseries		Won	
2003	Online Film & Television Association Awards	Best Editing in a Motion Picture or Miniseries		Nominated	
2003	Online Film & Television Association Awards	Best Lighting in a Motion Picture or Miniseries		Nominated	
2003	Online Film & Television Association Awards	Best Makeup/Hairstyling in a Motion Picture or Miniseries		Nominated	
2003	Online Film & Television Association Awards	Best Production Design in a Motion Picture or Miniseries		Nominated	
2003	Primetime Emmy Awards	Outstanding Made for Television Movie	Robert Allan Ackerman, Frank Doelger, and Ann Wingate	Nominated	
2003	Primetime Emmy Awards	Outstanding Lead Actress in a Miniseries or a Movie	Maggie Smith	Won	
2003	Primetime Emmy Awards	Outstanding Supporting Actor in a Miniseries or a Movie	Chris Cooper	Nominated	
2003	Primetime Emmy Awards	Outstanding Directing for a Miniseries, Movie or a Dramatic Special	Richard Loncraine	Nominated	
2003	Primetime Emmy Awards	Outstanding Writing for a Miniseries, Movie or a Dramatic Special	Hugh Whitemore	Nominated	
2003	Primetime Emmy Awards	Outstanding Art Direction for a Miniseries, Movie or a Special	Luciana Arrighi, Cristina Onori, and Alessandra Querzola	Nominated	
2003	Primetime Emmy Awards	Outstanding Casting for a Miniseries, Movie or a Special	Irene Lamb	Nominated	
2003	Primetime Emmy Awards	Outstanding Costumes for a Miniseries, Movie or a Special	Nicoletta Ercole, Rosa Palma, and M. Erminia Melato	Nominated	
2003	Primetime Emmy Awards	Outstanding Hairstyling for a Miniseries, Movie or a Special	Maria Teresa Corridoni, Desiree Corridoni, Gianna Viola, and Anna De Santis	Nominated	
2004	AARP Movies for Grownups Awards	Best TV Movie		Nominated	
2004	Cinema Audio Society Awards	Outstanding Achievement in Sound Mixing for Television Movies and Mini-Series	David Stephenson, Robin O'Donoghue, Mike Dowson, and Mark Taylor	Nominated	
2004	Directors Guild of America Awards	Outstanding Directorial Achievement in Movies for Television	Richard Loncraine	Nominated	
2004	Golden Globe Awards	Best Miniseries or Motion Picture Made for Television		Nominated	
2004	Golden Globe Awards	Best Actress in a Miniseries or a Motion Picture Made for Television	Maggie Smith	Nominated	
2004	Producers Guild of America Awards	David L. Wolper Award for Outstanding Producer of Long-Form Television	Frank Doelger, Robert Allan Ackerman, and Ann Wingate	Won	
2004	Satellite Awards	Best Motion Picture Made for Television		Nominated	
2004	Satellite Awards	Best Actress in a Miniseries or a Motion Picture Made for Television	Maggie Smith	Nominated	
2004	Satellite Awards	Best Actor in a Supporting Role in a Series, Miniseries or a Motion Picture Made for Television	Chris Cooper	Nominated	
2004	Young Artist Awards	Best Family Television Movie or Special		Nominated	
2004	Young Artist Awards	Best Performance in a TV Movie, Miniseries or Special – Supporting Young Actress	Emmy Clarke	Won	

== See also ==
- Two Lives, the volume on which the film is based
