= Hawthornden Prize =

British literary award

- Awarded for: "imaginative literature" (poetry or prose) by British, Irish or British-based authors
- First award: 1919; 107 years ago
- Website: www.hawthornden.org/hawthornden-prize

The Hawthornden Prize is a British literary award given annually to a British, Irish or British-based author for a work of "imaginative literature" – including poetry, novels, history, biography and creative non-fiction – published in the previous calendar year.

The prize is for a book in English, not for a translation. Previous winners of the prize are excluded from the shortlist. Unlike other major literary awards, the Hawthornden Prize does not solicit submissions. There have been several gap years without a recipient (1945–57, 1959, 1966, 1971–73, and 1984–87).

The Hawthornden Prize was established in 1919 by Alice Warrender. It, and the James Tait Black Memorial Prizes, are Britain's oldest literary awards.

The award offered £100 in 1936. It had increased to £2,000 by 1995, and by 2017 it was worth £15,000. It was formerly administered by the Hawthornden Trust set up by Warrender, and sponsored by the private trust of Drue Heinz. It is currently administered by Hawthornden Foundation, established by Drue Heinz.

== Awards ==
Hawthornden Prize winners
Year	Author	Title	Ref.
1919	Edward Shanks	The Queen of China	
1920	John Freeman	Poems New and Old	
1921	Romer Wilson	The Death of Society	
1922	Edmund Blunden	The Shepherd	
1923	David Garnett	Lady into Fox	
1924	Ralph Hale Mottram	The Spanish Farm	
1925	Seán O'Casey	Juno and the Paycock	
1926	Vita Sackville-West	The Land	
1927	Henry Williamson	Tarka the Otter	
1928	Siegfried Sassoon	Memoirs of a Fox-Hunting Man	
1929	Lord David Cecil	The Stricken Deer	
1930	Geoffrey Dennis	The End of the World	
1931	Kate O'Brien	Without My Cloak	
1932	Charles Morgan	The Fountain	
1933	Vita Sackville-West	Collected Poems	
1934	James Hilton	Lost Horizon	
1935	Robert Graves	I, Claudius	
1936	Evelyn Waugh	Edmund Campion	
1937	Ruth Pitter	A Trophy of Arms	
1938	David Jones	In Parenthesis	
1939	Christopher Hassall	Penthesperon	
1940	James Pope-Hennessy	London Fabric	
1941	Graham Greene	The Power and the Glory	
1942	John Llewellyn Rhys	England Is My Village	
1943	Sidney Keyes	The Cruel Solstice and The Iron Laurel	
1944	Martyn Skinner	Letters to Malaya	
1958	Dom Moraes	A Beginning	
1960	Alan Sillitoe	The Loneliness of the Long-Distance Runner	
1961	Ted Hughes	Lupercal	
1962	Robert Shaw	The Sun Doctor	
1963	Alistair Horne	The Price of Glory: Verdun 1916	
1964	V. S. Naipaul	Mr Stone and the Knights Companion	
1965	William Trevor	The Old Boys	
1966	Michael Frayn	The Russian Interpreter	
1967	Michael Levey	Early Renaissance	
1968	Geoffrey Hill	King Log	
1969	Piers Paul Read	Monk Dawson	
1974	Oliver Sacks	Awakenings	
1975	David Lodge	Changing Places	
1976	Robert Nye	Falstaff	
1977	Bruce Chatwin	In Patagonia	
1978	David Cook	Walter	
1979	P. S. Rushforth	Kindergarten	
1980	Christopher Reid	Arcadia	
1981	Douglas Dunn	St. Kilda's Parliament	
1982	Timothy Mo	Sour Sweet	
1983	Jonathan Keates	Allegro Postillions	
1988	Colin Thubron	Behind the Wall: A Journey through China	
1989	Alan Bennett	Talking Heads	
1990	Kit Wright	Short Afternoons	
1991	Claire Tomalin	The Invisible Woman	
1992	Ferdinand Mount	Of Love and Asthma	
1993	Andrew Barrow	The Tap Dancer	
1994	Tim Pears	In the Place of Fallen Leaves	
1995	James Michie	Collected Poems	
1996	Hilary Mantel	An Experiment in Love	
1997	John Lanchester	The Debt to Pleasure	
1998	Charles Nicholl	Somebody Else: Arthur Rimbaud in Africa	
1999	Antony Beevor	Stalingrad	
2000	Michael Longley	The Weather in Japan	
2001	Helen Simpson	Hey Yeah Right Get a Life	
2002	Eamon Duffy	The Voices of Morebath: Reformation and Rebellion in an English Village	
2003	William Fiennes	The Snow Geese	
2004	Jonathan Bate	John Clare: A Biography	
2005	Justin Cartwright	The Promise of Happiness	
2006	Alexander Masters	Stuart: A Life Backwards	
2007	M. J. Hyland	Carry Me Down	
2008	Nicola Barker	Darkmans	
2009	Patrick French	The World Is What It Is	
2010	Alice Oswald	A Sleepwalk on the Severn	
2011	Candia McWilliam	What to Look for in Winter	
2012	Ali Smith	There But For The	
2013	Jamie McKendrick	Out There	
2014	Emily Berry	Dear Boy	
2015	Colm Tóibín	Nora Webster	
2016	Tessa Hadley	The Past	
2017	Graham Swift	Mothering Sunday	
2018	Jenny Uglow	Mr Lear	
2019	Sue Prideaux	I Am Dynamite!	
2020	John McCullough	Reckless Paper Birds	
2022	Ian Duhig	New and Selected Poems	
2023	Moses McKenzie	An Olive Grove in Ends	
2024	Samantha Harvey	Orbital	
2025	Manya Wilkinson	Lublin	

== See also ==
- List of British literary awards
