= Felicia's Journey =

1994 novel by William Trevor

- First edition
- Author: William Trevor
- Language: English
- Genre: Novel
- Publisher: Viking Press
- Publication date: 1994
- Publication place: Ireland
- Media type: Print (Hardcover & Paperback)
- Pages: 240 pp.
- ISBN: 978-0140253603
- Preceded by: Two Lives
- Followed by: Death in Summer

Felicia's Journey is a novel written by Irish author William Trevor, first published by Viking Press in 1994. The novel was made into a 1999 film of the same name.

The book won the Whitbread Prize and The Sunday Express Book of the Year in 1994.

== Plot ==
Felicia, an eighteen-year-old girl from a small town in rural Ireland, finds herself pregnant. The father is Johnny Lysaght, a young man from the same town now supposedly working in the English Midlands. Felicia wants to contact him, but doesn't have his address, and her attempts to obtain it are thwarted. Felicia's father (a staunch Irish republican) is deeply distrustful of Johnny, who is rumoured to have joined the British Army. Without telling anyone, and having stolen some money from her great-grandmother, Felicia sets off for England in search of Johnny.

All she knows is that Johnny works in the stores of a lawn mower factory in a certain town north of Birmingham. However, when she reaches the town, nobody knows of any such factory. At one factory where she makes enquiries, she encounters Joseph Hilditch, a middle-aged and overweight catering manager. They later meet again, seemingly by chance: in fact he has started to follow her. He offers suggestions to help her in her search, none of which are productive. He then suggests investigating a factory in another town, and offers her a lift there: he says that he has to drive his wife to a hospital appointment nearby. Felicia reluctantly accepts the offer. On the day, Hilditch explains the absence of his wife (who does not in fact exist) by saying that her operation had been brought forward, and that he had taken her to the hospital the previous evening. The factory proves to be another dead end. While Felicia is out of the car, Hilditch searches her bags and takes her reserve of money.

Felicia is discovered on the streets by Miss Calligary, a West Indian evangelical Christian missionary, who offers accommodation at her mission, the Gathering House. Felicia finds the atmosphere there oppressive, and leaves. She discovers the loss of her money, and returns to the mission to make enquiries: Miss Calligary and the other residents take offence at the suggestion of theft. Back on the streets, Felicia meets other homeless people. Later, she makes her way to Hilditch's house, where he tells her that his wife has died. He offers help, including accommodation. Eventually, he persuades Felicia – against her instincts – to have an abortion, for which he pays. At the clinic, he makes a point of describing her to others as his "girlfriend".

Felicia returns to Hilditch's house to recover. During the night, he tells her about six other young women, in difficulties in various ways, whom he has "helped" in the past. She comes to the realisation that these girls are all now dead. He proposes that she join him in his car, so that he can give her money and take her on the first leg of her journey home. She determines to do no such thing. What happens next is unstated.

The novel's focus now shifts to Hilditch. He feels deflated by the end of his "friendship" with Felicia. He is visited by Miss Calligary, who attempts to convert him to her faith. In the course of their conversation, Miss Calligary realises that he is the man mentioned by Felicia as having helped her; but Hilditch denies any knowledge of the girl. He is troubled by the incident – and the implications for his own security – and over the following weeks loses his appetite for food and for life. His own investigations have established that Johnny Lysaght is indeed in the army, and he manages to spot Johnny in a pub frequented by soldiers. He takes sick leave from work. Miss Calligary continues to call, and when he reluctantly speaks to her he becomes convinced she knows more than she is saying. He searches for Felicia in vain, and concludes that she must have left the town, but then remembers that she had no money. He returns to work, but feels increasingly disturbed. Eventually, in desperation, he hangs himself.

The final chapter returns to Felicia. She is still homeless and living on the streets, but has moved to London. However, she returns to the Midlands under a compelling need to know what has happened to Hilditch. She finds that his house is for sale, and meets Miss Calligary, who tells her of his death.

== Reception ==
Publishers Weekly in a starred review stated the novel "is a thriller lifted to the level of high art, and it should win Trevor many new admirers." Kirkus Reviews, also in a starred review, noted that "Trevor's combination of the pathological and the lyrical transcends mere genre fiction: He's a master still exploring the possibilities of his craft." The Independent said "for all its residual lyricism, it leaves a sour taste."
