= Eliot Bliss =

Jamaican-born English novelist and poet (1903–1990)

- Born: Eileen Norah Lees Bliss; 12 June 1903; Jamaica
- Died: 10 December 1990 (aged 87); Bishop's Stortford, Hertfordshire
- Occupation: Writer
- Writing career
- Language: English
- Genre: Bildungsroman
- Notable works: Saraband, Luminous Isle

Eliot Bliss (12 June 1903 – 10 December 1990) was a Jamaican-born English novelist and poet of Anglo-Irish descent, whose literary friendships encompassed Anna Wickham, Dorothy Richardson, Jean Rhys, Romer Wilson and Vita Sackville-West.

== Life ==
Eliot Bliss was born as Eileen Norah Lees Bliss in Kingston, Jamaica on June 12, 1903 to Eva Lees and Captain John Plomer Bliss, an officer in the West Indian Regiment of the British Army. Bliss was educated at a number of British Catholic convent schools. Her brother John was sent to school in England at the same time.

She returned in 1923 to Jamaica for two years, a period that would provide inspiration for her second and last novel. She then settled permanently in England and gained a diploma in journalism from University College, London. In 1925 she renamed herself Eliot as a mark of her respect for George Eliot and T. S. Eliot.

Over subsequent years Bliss held various jobs in publishing and made friends with other women writers, notably fellow novelists Romer Wilson, who gave her financial support while she wrote her first novel, and Vita Sackville-West, who helped find a publisher for Luminous Isle. Her first novel, Saraband, was published in 1931 with the help of Patience Ross, a poet and literary agent who would become Bliss' friend and lover. Her relations with the Australian-born poet Anna Wickham (1883–1947) are said to have been intimate. She lived as a companion for over half a century with Patricia Allan-Burns, an artist, in Bishop's Stortford, Hertfordshire, where she died in 1990. Allan-Burns disposed of her literary estate, the Bliss Collections, in three stages to the McFarlin Library at the University of Tulsa.

Bliss left daily diaries in 19 volumes covering January 1959 – December 1960 and January 1963 – August 1980. Prominent authors in her personal library, also held at the McFarlin Library, include Jean Rhys, Radclyffe Hall and Emily Dickinson.

== Writings ==
Each of Bliss's two published novels can be classed as a bildungsroman. Saraband (1931, reissued 1986) features Louie, a sensitive girl from a genteel family conscious of her inability to do anything of note, unlike her violinist cousin. Her wishes are made clear: "I don't want to go out into the world and earn my living. I don't want to have to say goodbye to a quiet scholar's life, to smooth, civilized hours around a Wedgwood teapot.... I don't want to be terrorised into a set formula of life." However, family financial problems force her to train as a typist, making her "afraid of turning into a machine," but she eventually recognizes the creativity in herself and begins to write. The book was widely praised for its modernist and feminist ideas. Saraband was received positively by critics, with William Morrow describing it as a "first novel of unusual power" and Harold Nicolson praising Bliss' "quality of reserve" in the Daily Express.

Luminous Isle is a largely autobiographical tale of a girl's return to Jamaica at the age of 19, after attending school in England. Her desire to treat the island as home is thwarted by the narrowness of life there, its "hypocrisy and hidden indecencies" and its racism. As a recent critic has pointed out, "The underlying homosexuality of the characters is never spelled out; it remains unuttered, and the intricate implications of the relationships... are never fully explained." A third book of hers, The Albatross, said to have been published in 1935, cannot be traced.

The poems of Eliot Bliss were not found until 2004, in the home she had shared with Allan-Burns. They were edited and introduced by the University of Trieste academic Michela A. Calderaro and published electronically. Calderaro is also working on a biography.

The papers of Eliot Bliss (diaries 1959–1980) are held at the McFarlin Library at the University of Tulsa. They consist of "19 volumes of daily diaries dating from January 1959 to December 1960, and January 1963 to August 1980. Additional notes, correspondence, poems, photographs and sales receipts are laid into many of the diaries, all of which have been noted in the inventory and... in 'Notes on my Diaries', written by Bliss."
