= Reinis Zusters =

Latvian-born Australian artist

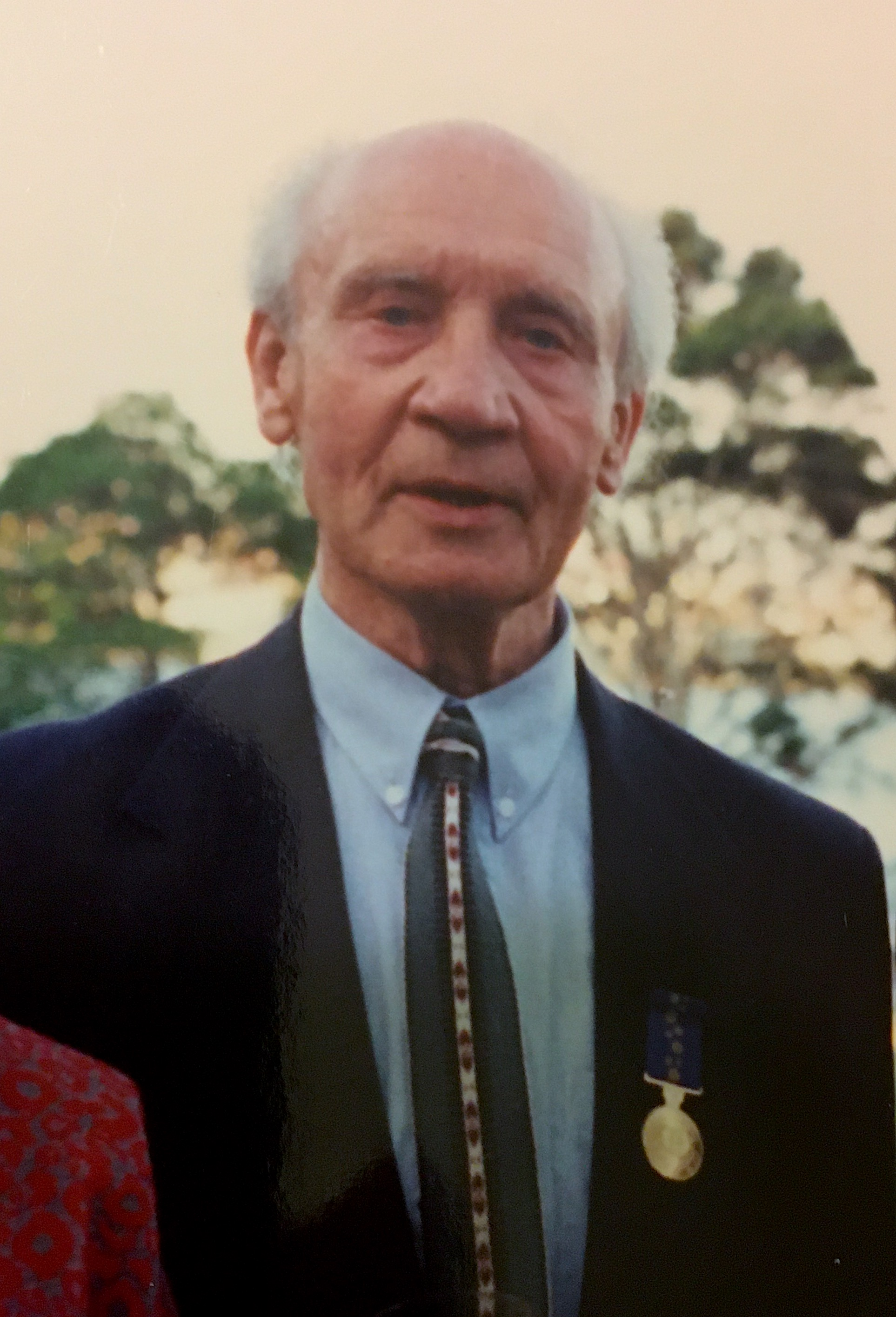
Reinis Zusters at Order of Australia awards ceremony in June 1994

Reinis Zusters OAM (15 October 1919 – 1999) was a Latvian-born Australian artist. Zusters was a prolific painter, working predominantly in oils, painting many large landscapes, including triptychs of the Blue Mountains. Zusters drew much of his inspiration from the Australian countryside, depicting the colour and form of nature as a rich and vibrant panorama.

His work is represented in numerous public and private collections in Australia and abroad. His work can be seen at the National Portrait Gallery of Australia, the Art Gallery of New South Wales, and the Auckland Art Gallery Toi o Tāmaki. He won numerous prestigious awards in Australia, Japan and United States and was honoured with the Medal of the Order of Australia in 1994. He was born to Latvian parents in Odesa, Ukraine, and died in his studio in Wentworth Falls, Australia in 1999.

== Early life in Europe ==
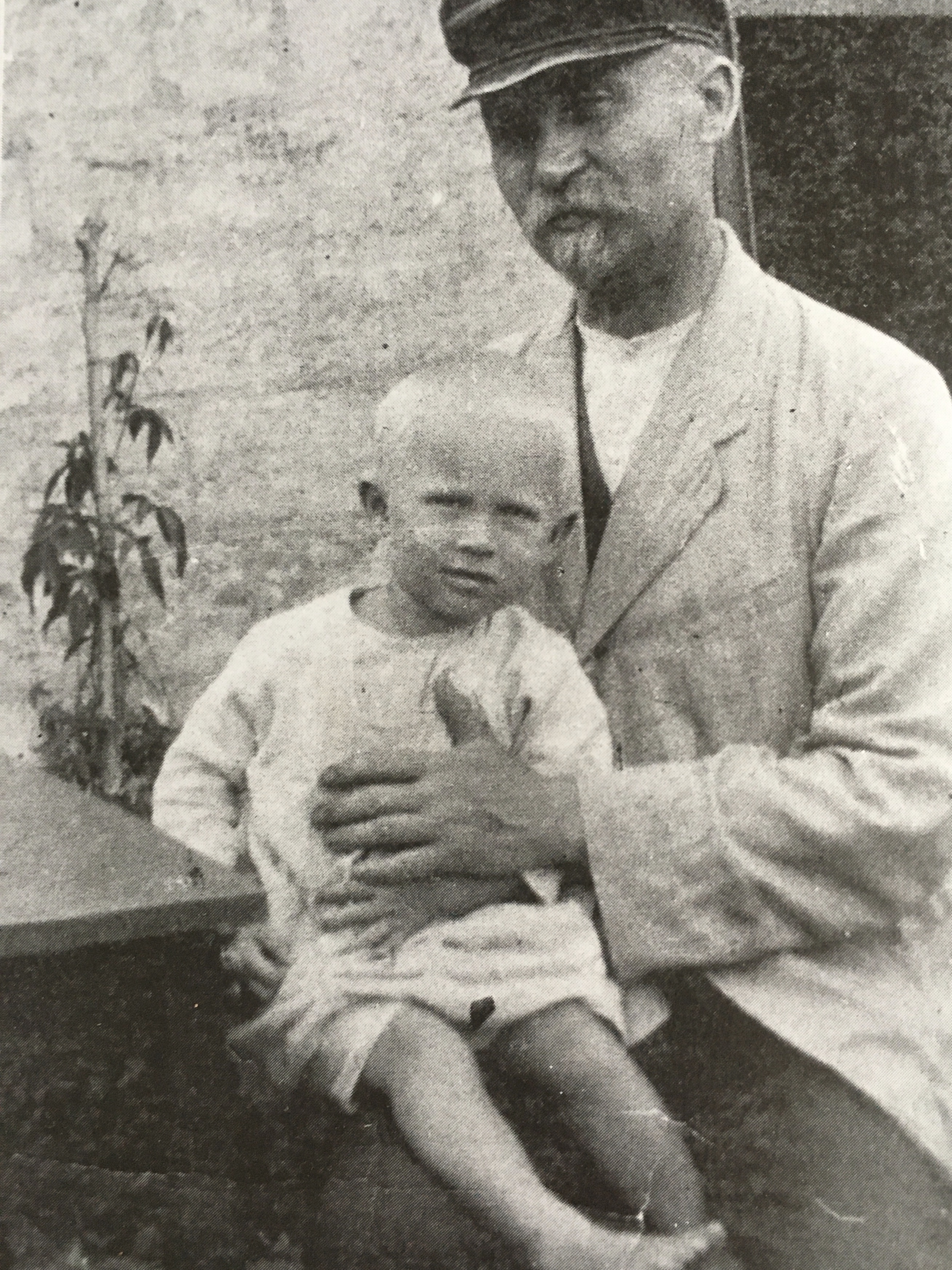
Two year old Reinis Zusters in Odesa with his father

Reinis Zusters was born 15 October 1919 in Odesa, Ukraine, of Latvian parents, Janis and Kristina, in the early years of the Russian Revolution. Zusters' father was a postmaster in Odesa, but died before he was two years old. His mother sought work in Riga, having put both Reinis and his sister Mirdze into separate orphanages from an early age. Mirdze's daughter, also Mirdze, later studied to be an artist in Moscow.

Zusters studied Art and Architecture at the Riga Technical College, Latvia, from 1935 to 1940 and took a one year course in anatomy at Riga University. He was influenced by his Latvian cultural heritage and admired the artist Voldemars Tone (1892-1958). He set up a business in Riga designing and making furniture while concentrating on painting and athletics in his spare time. He married Aldija Kapteinis and they had a daughter, Rudita (born 1942 in Riga).

During World War II, Zusters was conscripted into the German army and worked as a war artist from 1942 to 1945, in a group of four men, that included a journalist and photographer, who were sent to document battles and important developments in the war. He and the group spent weeks digging out and burying bodies after the bombing of Dresden. He also survived being torpedoed on a ship in the Baltic Sea.

After World War II, when Russia invaded Latvia, the Zusters family became refugees, living in Oldenburg and Krefeld Displaced Persons camps in Germany for 7 years. He studied art part-time and took the opportunity to visit galleries and museums to study German art.

== Early life in Australia ==
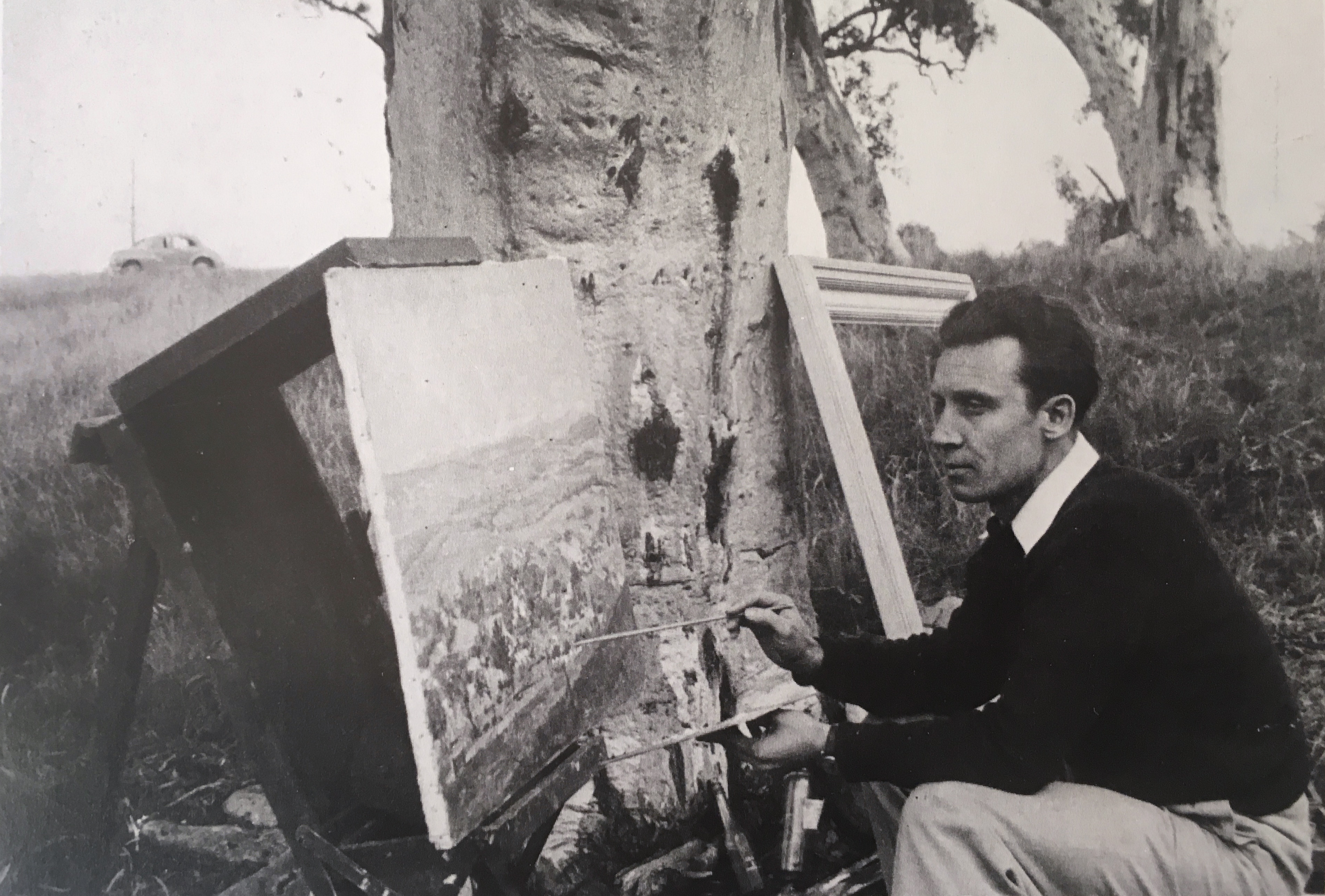
Reinis Zusters painting at Duntroon 1951

Zusters, his wife Aldija and daughter Rudita arrived in Australia as Latvian displaced persons in 1950. About 25,000 Latvian refugees migrated to Australia between 1948 and 1951. On landing in Fremantle on 5 January 1950, the family was sent to Northam Migrant Camp and Zusters' first action was to visit the bush with easel and paints. His first trip into the Australian bush was a turning point. It was a marked difference to the landscapes of Europe that his eye was familiar with. Unlike many migrants, he immediately saw the Australian bush as beautiful, rather than harsh. He remained excited and inspired by the wildness of the Australian bush and geology for the rest of his life and they were to be a continuing subject of his explorations.

Zusters stayed in Western Australia for six months, then the family was sent to Cowra Migrant Camp, where his wife and daughter stayed, while he moved to Canberra and became an architectural draughtsman with the Department of Works and Housing in Canberra. He also worked in a timber yard and painted portraits at the nearby Duntroon Royal Military College, painting late into the night after work. In 1951, he held his first solo show in Canberra, with the Art Society of Canberra. He had a second show in Canberra in 1956.

In 1952, Zusters moved with his second wife, Arija Bikse, from Canberra to Pennant Hills in Sydney to help her family build their first home in Australia. Arija's father Karlis Bikse had been a prominent architect in Riga, Latvia and was an inspiration to Reinis. Their daughter Laura was born in Sydney in 1956.

Zusters studied art for two years in the early 1950s at East Sydney Technical College and painted many large portraits including Winston Churchill's gardener John Price Strange, which was purchased by the Art Gallery of New South Wales in 1952, as well as small informal portrait-drawings of friends. Some early portraits are held by the Latvian Society in Strathfield.

== Early career in Sydney ==
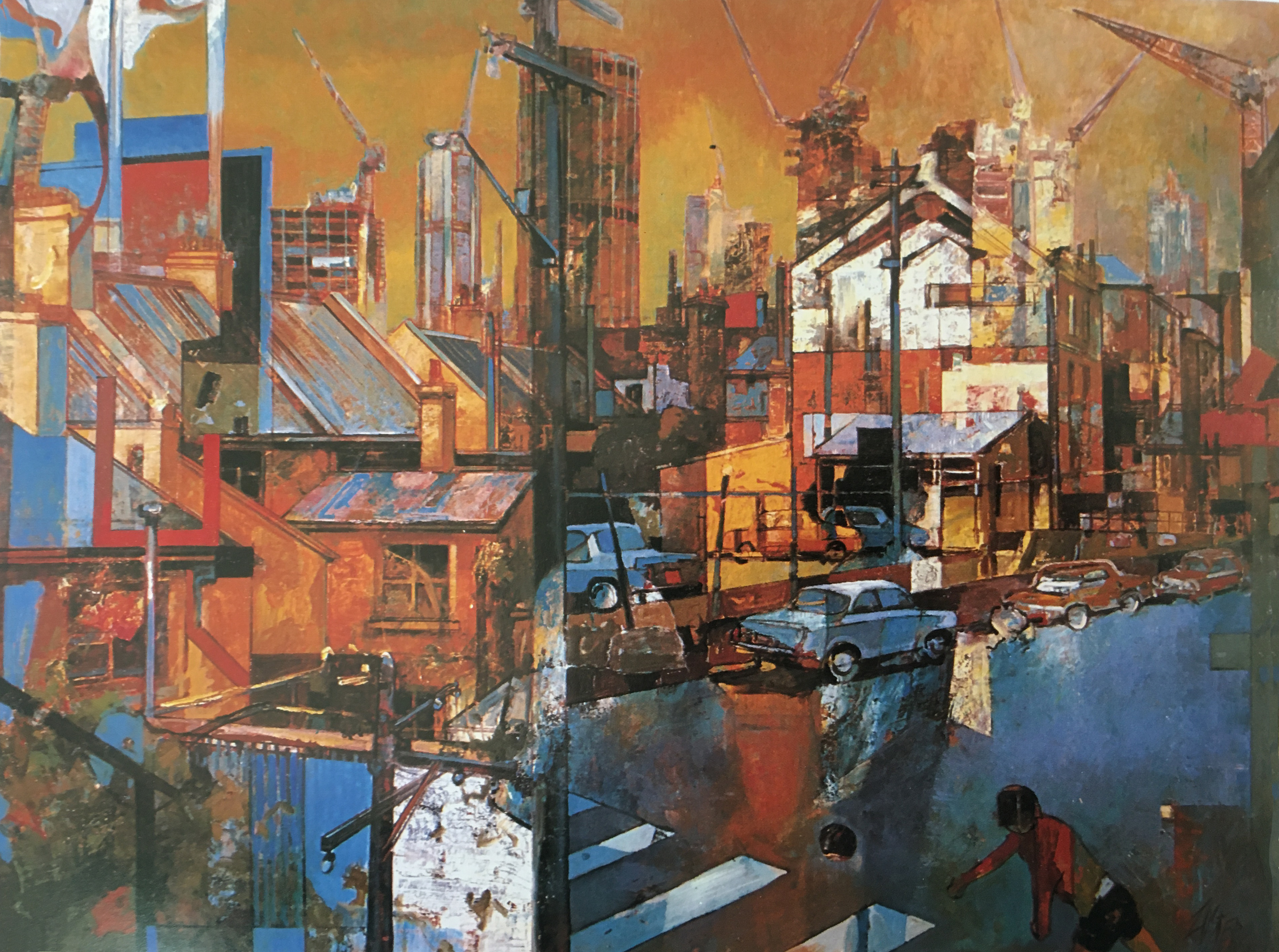
Early urban Sydney landscape by the artist Reinis Zusters

Through his design work, Zusters was appointed Chief Designer with the Australian-American architectural firm Austin-Anderson, at St. Leonards, Sydney, which provided him with the opportunity to travel abroad. In 1960, he designed a new waterfront family home in Arabella St Longueville, on Woodford Bay in Sydney Harbour.

In 1963, Zusters was one of four outstanding local artists appointed to the Lane Cove Art Panel, alongside Lloyd Rees, Bill Pigeon and Guy Warren. The Lane Cove Art Society was formed in 1965 and Zusters was an enthusiastic member for many years until he moved to the Blue Mountains.

From 1968, Zusters quit his job and practised as a full-time professional artist. His cityscapes featured a rich paint surface and sharp-edged thickness of oil paint applied with a palette knife in layers. He painted urban scenes of Sydney, inland Australia and portraits. His usual signature was "Zusters". Two of his early portraits are in the National Portrait Gallery's collection – Sir Edgar Coles (1962) and Terry Clune (1960)].

In 1970, Zusters moved to Greenwich. Over the ensuing decades he exhibited regularly in Australia and overseas, holding one man shows at Artarmon Galleries, Darlinghurst Galleries and the South Yarra Gallery. At the Sobot Gallery in Toronto in 1968, he was the first Australian to have a solo exhibition in Canada. He also had a solo exhibition at Gallery Schauman in Essen, Germany in 1965 and at Christchurch New Zealand in 1974.

In the introduction to the catalogue 'Reinis Zusters', published in Sydney in 1971, artist Lloyd Rees wrote of his friend's zest for living and 'complete freedom of emotional expression', expressed in work where 'nature's forms and colours undergo a magic change and emerge as vital and highly individualistic paintings.'

== Blue Mountains ==
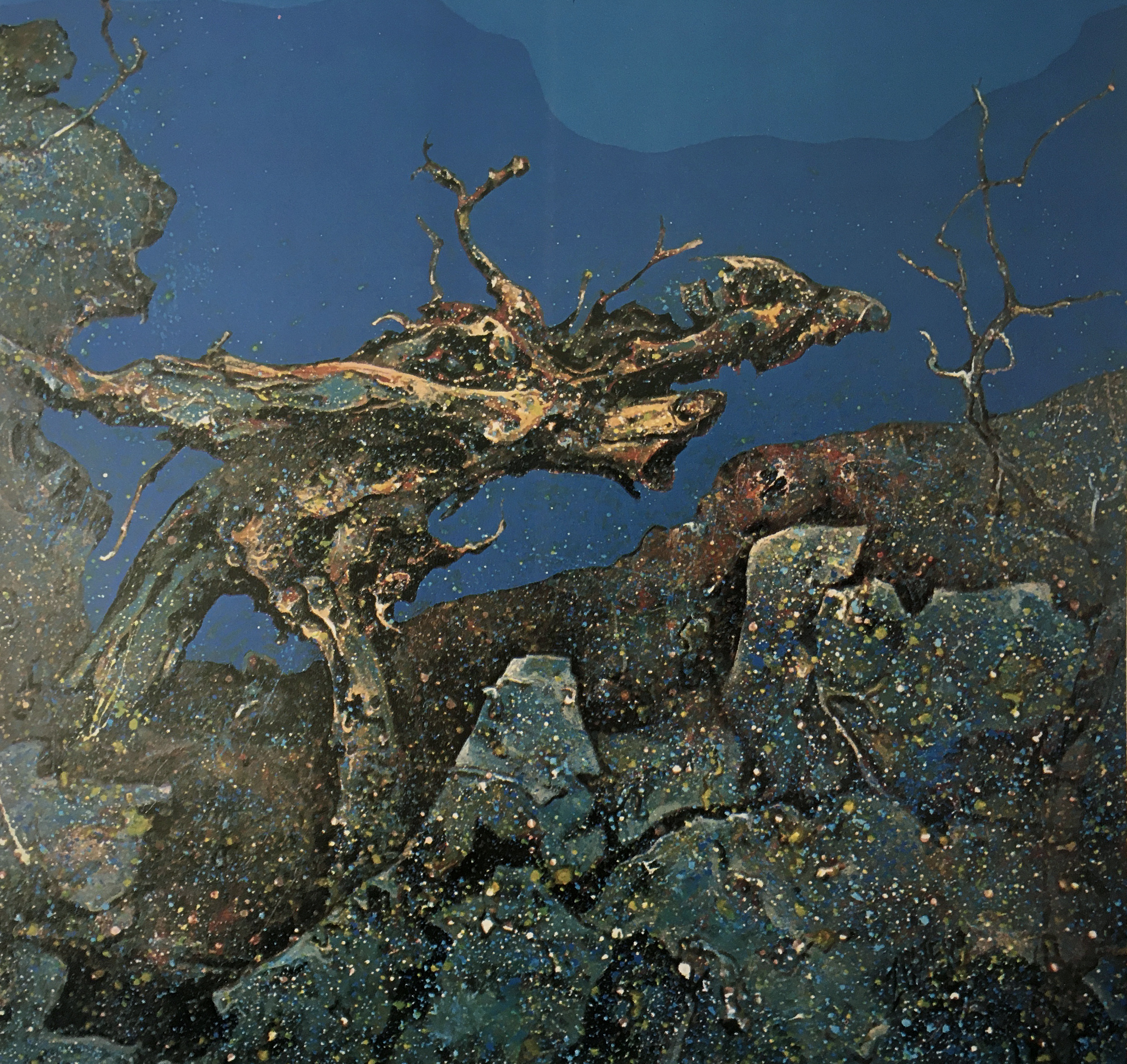
Blue Mountains landscape

In 1976, Zusters married his third wife, artist Venita Salnajs, who is also Latvian born, and they moved to Wentworth Falls. Inspired by the mountains, he embarked on a freer style of spattered landscapes and details, capturing the essence and spirit of the Australian landscape and sky.

He often prepared the canvasses for his mountain landscapes in batches, laid out on the grass, splattering backgrounds in the manner of Jackson Pollock and completing with washes and pale glazes of colour. His paintings often featured skies in his distinctive vibrant blue.

He said at the time, "The Blue Mountains lure me. The close-focus and long-range aspects of the landscape present a magical ambiguity and this, coupled with its logs, lichen and moss and perpetual blue sky, totally absorb me."

While living in the Blue Mountains and exhibiting at the Holdsworth Galleries, the coffee table book 'Spiral Vision – Reinis Zusters' was published in 1981 to showcase his work.

Zusters exhibited at the Lewers Bequest and Penrith Regional Gallery and Ozartspace Katoomba, among many others. Blue Mountains City Council purchased several of his works and architect Nigel Bell designed the Conservation Hut in Wentworth Falls, which was built to house and display several of his larger paintings.

Zusters remained in the Blue Mountains for the rest of his life, living in his home 'Jamieson', near the Falls and Darwin's Walk. He died on 8 October 1999 in his favourite painting chair in his studio at Wentworth Falls, one week short of his 80th birthday. He was buried in the Latvian section of Rookwood Cemetery, Sydney.

== Honors and awards ==
Zusters' work is represented in numerous public and private collections in Australia and overseas. He won several prestigious awards in Australia, United States and Japan, the latter being the Bronze Prize in the 1990 Osaka Triennale'90 and the Special Prize at the Osaka Triennale'93 in 1993. He achieved his win from over 29,000 artists competing from 81 countries.

He won the Daily Telegraph Art Prize in 1957 and the Hunters Hill prize in 1958 and 1959. In 1959, Zusters took the Wynne Prize for Landscape, then the Rockdale Prize in 1962, the Crouch Prize, Bendigo Art Gallery in 1963 and the Mosman Art Prize, 1971. His portrait of potter Peter Rushforth was exhibited in Portraits of Australia: The Doug Moran National Portrait Prize Collection in 1988. In 1994, he was honored with the Order of Australia Medal.

== Birth of a Nation and other murals ==
For the Australian Bicentenary in 1988, Zusters completed his grandest work – a series of massive epic panels entitled The Birth of a Nation. Thirteen huge paintings consisted of 42 smaller and 34 large panels, depicting his interpretation of Australia's development since the Aborigines first encountered white men in 1788. His wife Venita described them as "a kind of psalm-devotional and a hymn of praise to everything Australian". Birth of a Nation was exhibited at the newly opened Parramatta Cultural Centre, now called the Riverside Theatre. The Centre still holds some of these panels.

His other murals include Man's Struggle for Identity in Trans City House, Sydney and a World War II memorial in Christchurch Cathedral, Newcastle, after winning the competition to paint it.

== Solo exhibitions ==
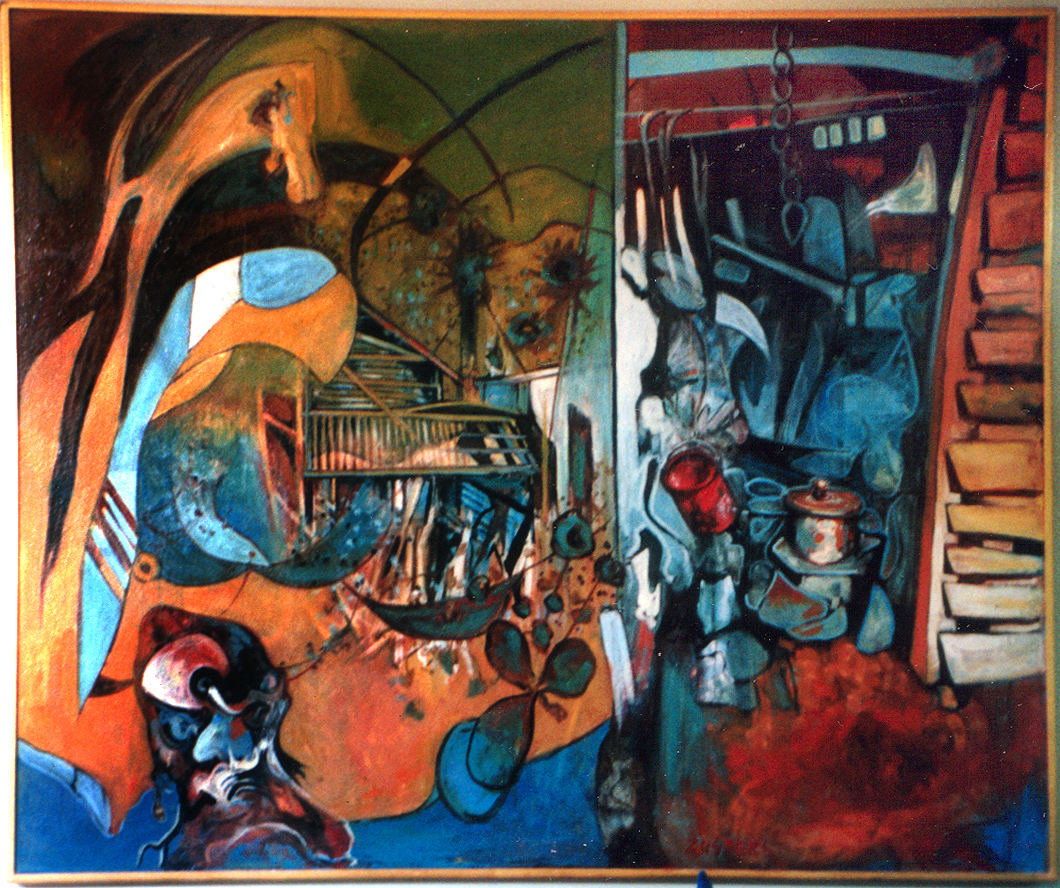
Painting by Reinis Zusters, artist, Mozart On His Journey to Prague, late 1990s

Sources

- 1999 Ozartspace, Katoomba, NSW
- 1994 Holdsworth Galleries, Sydney
- 1992 Holdsworth Galleries, Sydney
- 1988 Australian Bicentennial Project, Birth of a Nation, City of Parramatta Cultural Centre, City of the Blue Mountains Civic Centre, and Holdsworth Galleries, Sydney
- 1987, Holdsworth Galleries, Sydney
- 1984 Reinis Zusters Survey Exhibition, The Lewers Bequest and Penrith Regional Art Gallery, Sydney
- 1981 Book launch of Spiral Vision and exhibition, Holdsworth Galleries, Sydney
- 1981 Trinity Society of Arts: Reinis Zusters Tribute Exhibition, Delmar Gallery Sydney
- 1978 Adelaide Arts Festival, David Sumner Galleries, Adelaide, SA
- 1977 Royal Easter Show Art Prize Exhibition, Sydney Showground, Sydney
- 1974 C.S.A. Gallery, Canterbury Society of Arts, Christchurch, New Zealand
- 1971 South Yarra Gallery, Melbourne
- 1968 Sobot Galleries, Toronto, Canada
- 1967 South Yarra Gallery, Melbourne
- 1967 Darlinghurst Galleries, Sydney, opened by Lloyd Rees
- 1966 White Studio Gallery, Adelaide
- 1966 Darlinghurst Galleries, Sydney
- 1965 Gallerie Schaumann, Essen, Germany
- 1965 Dominion Gallery, Sydney
- 1964 South Yarra Gallery, Melbourne
- 1963 Artarmon Galleries, Sydney
- 1961 Terry Clune Galleries, Sydney
- 1956 Artists' Society of Canberra, Canberra, ACT
- 1951 Artists' Society of Canberra, Canberra, ACT

== Important group exhibitions ==
Sources

- 1996 Osaka Triennale 1996, Osaka Japan
- 1996 Two Worlds One Sky, joint exhibition with wife Venita Salnajs at Lewers Bequest and Penrith Regional Art Gallery and at the National Art Museum, Riga, Latvia
- 1993 Osaka Triennale, Osaka Japan
- 1990 Osaka Triennale 1990, Mydome Osaka, Osaka, Japan
- 1990–1991 Latvian Artists – Side by Side, High Court of Australia, Canberra, ACT
- 1990–1991 A Regional Response, Lewers Bequest & Penrith Regional Art Gallery, Sydney
- 1990 The General Exhibition of Latvian Art, Riga Latvia
- 1989 Lloyd Rees and Friends, Von Bertouch Galleries 26th Anniversary Exhibition, Newcastle, NSW
- 1988 The Artist and Lane Cove, Bicentennial Exhibition of Celebrated Lane Cove Artists, Lane Cove Civic Centre, Sydney
- 1965 Reinis Zusters and William Peascod Exhibition, Dominion Galleries, Sydney
- 1963 Australian Art, National Art Gallery, Kuala Lumpur, Malaysia
- 1960 Australian Artists Exhibitions, France & United States

== Awards and prizes ==
Sources

- 1996 Television Osaka Inc. Prize
- 1994 Order of Australia Medal (OAM), Australian Federal Government
- 1993 Habikino City Prize, Osaka Triennale'93, Japan (International Triennial Competition of Painting)
- 1990 Bronze Prize, Osaka Triennale'90, Japan (International Triennial Competition of Painting)
- 1988 Honorary Recognition Prize for Birth of a Nation Bicentennial Project, Free Latvian Cultural Foundation, USA
- 1988 Special Bicentennial Citizen Award, Council of the City of the Blue Mountains NSW
- 1981 Newcastle Cathedral Memorial Design Competition, Newcastle NSW
- 1980 McGregor Art Prize, Darling Downs Institute of Advanced Education, Toowoomba Queensland
- 1979 Eltham Art Prize, Melbourne
- 1972 Mosman Art Prize, Mosman Art Gallery, NSW
- 1963 Crouch Art Prize, Bendigo Art Gallery, Victoria
- 1962 Rockdale Art Prize, Sydney
- 1960 Winner of Wynne Prize for Landscape
- 1959 Wynne Prize for Landscape, Art Gallery of NSW (for Harbour Cruise)
- 1958/59 Hunters Hill Art Prize, Sydney
- 1957 Daily Telegraph Art Prize, Sydney
- 1952 Metro-Goldwyn-Mayer Art Prize, Canberra

== Major commissions ==
- 1987 Foyer Mural Sydney Harbour, CCH Australia, North Ryde, Sydney
- 1986 Church Mural Saints, Church of Our Lady Presbytery, South Blacktown, Sydney
- 1985 Church Mural Christening of the Croatians, Church of Our Lady Presbytery, South Blacktown, Sydney
- 1983 Historical Mural Parramatta, McNamara Group of Companies
- 1983 Foyer Mural Man's Struggle for Identity, Trans City House, City Freeholds, Sydney
- 1982 War Memorial Mural, Christchurch Cathedral, Newcastle
- 1973 Design of gold/silver plate for opening of the Sydney Opera House
- 1965 Foyer Mosaic Mural, Sydney Rebirth, Goldfields House, Circular Quay, Sydney
- 1952 Historical Painting, Royal Military College, Duntroon Canberra

== Australian representations ==
- Art Gallery of New South Wales, Sydney
- Art Gallery of South Australia, Adelaide
- Art Gallery of Western Australia, Perth
- Australian National Gallery, Canberra
- Australian National Portrait Gallery, Canberra
- Australian National University, Canberra
- Bendigo Art Gallery, Victoria
- Commonwealth Collection, Canberra
- Lewers Bequest and Penrith Regional Art Gallery, Sydney
- Museum and Art Gallery of the Northern Territory, Darwin
- Queensland Art Gallery, Brisbane
- Rockhampton Art Gallery, Queensland
- Tasmanian Museum and Art Gallery, Hobart
- Wagga Wagga City Art Gallery, NSW
- City of the Blue Mountains Art Collection, NSW
- Wellington National Gallery, New Zealand, now Museum of New Zealand
- Christchurch Art Gallery, New Zealand
- National Museum of Art, Riga, Latvia
- National Gallery, Kuala Lumpur
- Government Collection, Malaysia
- Dunedin Public Art Gallery, Dunedin, New Zealand
- Contemporary Art and Cultural Centre, Osaka, Japan
- University of New South Wales
- University of Southern Queensland, Toowoomba
- Downlands College Art Collection, Toowoomba
- The Shire of Eltham Collection, Victoria
- City of Parramatta Art Collection, NSW
- Warringah Collection, Manly
- Royal Military College, Duntroon Canberra
- Reserve Bank Collection, Sydney
- USA Embassy Collection, Canberra
- G.J. Coles Collection, Melbourne
- Travelodge Art Collection, Sydney
- Trinity Grammar School Collection, Sydney
- Shell Oil Company Collection, Melbourne
- World Trade Centre, Sydney

== References and publications ==
- Zusters, Reinis (1981), 'Spiral Vision', Bay Books, Sydney and London.
- Anon (1979), 'Latvian Artists in Australia', Compiled, written and published by Society of Latvian Artists in Australia (A.L.M.A.), Sydney, NSW.
- 'Reinis Zusters' (1971) Author Lloyd Rees, Collins Australian Artists Editions, Sydney, NSW and London, England.
- 'Art Folios' (1972) 12 Australian Paintings in the Art Gallery of New South Wales, Paul Milton, Heinemann, Melbourne
- 'Artists and Galleries of Australia and New Zealand (1975), Max Germain, Lansdowne Editions, Sydney
- Speirs, Hugh (1981), 'Landscape Art and the Blue Mountains', Alternative Publishing Co-operative, Sydney, NSW.
- Germaine, Max (1975), 'Artists and Galleries of Australia and New Zealand', Lansdowne Editions, Sydney, NSW.
- McGillick, Paul (2000), 'Tributes: Reinis Zusters', Volume 38, Number 1 (Spring), p 68. Art & Australia, Sydney, NSW.
- Milton, Paul (1972), 'Art Folios – 12 Australian Paintings in the Art Gallery of NSW', Heinemann, Melbourne, VIC.
- Washington, Judy (1989), 'Artists of Lane Cove', Lane Cove Public Library, Sydney, NSW.
- Zusters, Reinis (1988), 'The Birth of a Nation', Australian Bicentennial Authority, Sydney, NSW.
- 'Two Worlds – One Sky', (1995/6) Reinis Zusters and Venita Salnajs, catalogue Lewers Bequest and Penrith Regional Art Gallery, Sydney
- Osaka Triennale'90, catalogue, pg 74
- 'Obituary', no. 126, p. 40, Art Monthly Australia, December 1999
- 'Obituary', p. 20, Sydney Morning Herald, 19 October 1999
- Tributes: Reinis Zusters, Art & Australia Vol. 38 No. 1, p. 68 (2000) Paul McGillick
- Design and Art Australia Online
- Gauja, Martins (2000), 'Obituary', Maksla, (Latvian: Art) USA
- 'Zusters, Reinis (1981) Spiral Vision. Bay Books, Sydney, NSW'.
- Fred Rost, author, artist, Emeritus Professor in University of NSW
- Wife Venita Salnajs, artist, Sydney
- Daughters Laura Zusters, Sydney, and Rudita Leverington, Canberra
