= Anna Wickham =

English/Australian poet

Anna Wickham was the pseudonym of Edith Alice Mary Harper (1883 – 1 May 1947), an English/Australian poet who was a pioneer of modernist poetry, and one of the most important female poets writing during the first half of the twentieth century. She was friend to other important writers of the time, such as D. H. Lawrence, George Bernard Shaw, Katherine Mansfield and Dylan Thomas. Wickham also lived a transnational, unconventional life, moving between Australia, England and France. She is remembered as a modernist figure and feminist writer, one who did not command sustained critical attention in her lifetime, though her poetry did earn her a major reputation at the time of writing and had been frequently anthologised. Wickham's literary reputation has improved since her death and she is now regarded as an important early 20th-century woman writer.

== Early life ==
She was born in Wimbledon, London, and brought up in Australia, mostly in Brisbane and Sydney. Her pen-names imply an Australian self-identification: "Wickham" was adopted after a Brisbane street. She had used "John Oland" for her first collection, which alludes to the Jenolan Caves in New South Wales.

Wickham returned to London in 1904, where she took singing lessons and won a drama scholarship (at the future RADA, just founded). She pursued her singing in Paris in 1905 with Jean de Reszke, the Polish tenor.

In 1906 she married Patrick Hepburn, a City of London solicitor with interests in Romanesque architecture, and later astronomy. They had four sons. They lived first in central London, then in family houses in Hampstead: Downshire Hill, from 1909, and then from 1919 a house on Parliament Hill which would be her permanent home.

Wickham became involved in the contemporary philanthropic movement concerned with maternal care, at St Pancras Hospital.

== Career and strife ==
Wickham's first collection, Songs by John Oland, was published in 1911 under the eponymous male pseudonym, and presented a particular focus on the conflict between men and women, depicted in such poems as "Song of the Low-Caste Wife", "Surrender" and "Divorce". Other subjects included the ambition to be a writer, a post-Darwin loss of religious faith, and motherhood. According to Wickham's autobiographical writings, collected in The Writings of Anna Wickham: Free Woman and Poet, as well as a biography by Jennifer Vaughan Jones, Patrick Hepburn was vehemently opposed to Wickham's writing and prone to tyrannical rages. In 1911, he had her committed to a private asylum, on the basis that her belief that she was a poet was evidence of her insanity. Wickham remained at the psychiatric hospital for a period of about six weeks. According to Jennifer Vaughan Jones, the crisis was specifically precipitated by a poem Wickham had relayed to Hepburn, titled "Nervous Prostration", which includes the lines:

I married a man of the Croydon class

When I was twenty-two.

And I vex him, and he bores me

Till we don't know what to do!

Yet, writes Jennifer Vaughan Jones, at the asylum a doctor asked Wickham to recite Nervous Prostration to him, and was sufficiently impressed that he found her a pen and paper and encouraged her to continue with her writing.

Given the complexities of Wickham's emotional life at the time, including having birthed four children and suffered two miscarriages, along with domestic conflicts with her husband, there may have been other factors at play. However, this sort of sustained hostility was experienced by many pioneering women writers of the time. As Wickham wrote in a poem "Dedication to a Cook":

If any ask why there’s no great She-Poet,

Let him come live with me, and he will know it.

If I’d indite an ode or mend a sonnet,

I must go choose a dish or tie a bonnet….

During World War I Wickham met the poet and publishing impresario Harold Monro at his Poetry Bookshop. He encouraged her writing, and she published a second collection in 1915. This was the beginning of a thirty-year period during which she mixed with literati and artists in both London (and later in Paris). She became involved in bohemian circles, and achieved recognition among her peers. The poet and critic Louis Untermeyer described her as "a woman, who always entered a room as if she had just stamped across the moors.” George Orwell, a neighbour of Wickham's in the 1930s, described Wickham as “ferocious looking.” In 1936 Cedric Morris painted her portrait that reflected her "formidable character."

During World War I Patrick Hepburn spent time away from home, joining the RNAS. During this time, Anna struck up a friendship with D. H. Lawrence and his wife Frieda. Her relations with the novelist Eliot Bliss are said to have been intimate.

According to sources including The Times, The Telegraph, and Poetry By Heart, Wickham is said to have had a brief affair with the American modernist poet Hilda Doolittle. H.D., a central figure in the Imagist movement, was closely connected to many leading writers of the period, reflecting the overlapping and interconnected nature of these literary networks.

Her third son Richard died of scarlet fever aged four. She spent a period in the early 1920s in Paris, after his death, to recuperate. There she developed a passion for Natalie Barney. It was not returned in the same way, but they sustained a correspondence (later published as Postcards and Poems). She met some leading Paris figures in anglophone modernism of the time.

It is believed that her marriage was in crisis during 1926, and she was separated from her husband until 1928, though they reunited shortly before his death in an accident, on holiday, in 1929.

During the 1930s she was well-known in literary London, and wrote a great deal of poetry (much of which was later lost in war damage) and much of which remained unpublished. She did find support from the somewhat louche John Gawsworth, who in 1936 put out a Richards Press collection of her work. An extended autobiographical essay Prelude to a Spring Clean dates from 1935. That was the year in which she supported the just-married Dylan Thomas and Caitlin, and then quarrelled with them - allegedly throwing Dylan Thomas out of her house during a snowstorm.

In 1947, she committed suicide by hanging in her home in Hampstead. She left behind thousands of unpublished poems.

== Works ==
- Songs of John Oland (1911)
- The Contemplative Quarry (1915)
- The Man With A Hammer (1916)
- The Little Old House (1921)
- Thirty-Six Poems (1926)
- Anna Wickham: Richards' Shilling Selections from Edwardian Poets (1936, Richards Press)
- Selected Poems (1971)
- The Writings of Anna Wickham: Free Woman and Poet (1984), edited by R. D. Smith, includes "Prelude to a Spring Clean".

== Sources ==
- A New Matrix for Modernism: A Study of the Lives and Poetry of Charlotte Mew and Anna Wickham (2002), Nelljean McConeghey Rice
- Anna Wickham: A Poet's Daring Life (2003), Jennifer Vaughan Jones
