= Felicia's Journey (film) =

1999 film by Atom Egoyan

- Theatrical release poster
- Directed by: Atom Egoyan
- Written by: Atom Egoyan
- Based on: Felicia's Journey by William Trevor
- Produced by: Bruce Davey
- Starring: Bob Hoskins; Elaine Cassidy; Peter McDonald; Arsinée Khanjian
- Cinematography: Paul Sarossy
- Edited by: Susan Shipton
- Music by: Mychael Danna
- Production companies: Alliance Atlantis; Icon Productions; Icon Entertainment International; Marquis Films Ltd. The Movie Network; Screenventures XLIII
- Distributed by: Icon Film Distribution (United Kingdom); Alliance Atlantis Releasing (Canada)
- Release dates: 8 October 1999 (UK); 12 November 1999 (U.S.)
- Running time: 116 minutes
- Countries: United Kingdom; Canada
- Languages: English; French
- Box office: $824,295

Felicia's Journey is a 1999 psychological thriller film written and directed by Atom Egoyan and starring Elaine Cassidy and Bob Hoskins. It is based on the Whitbread Prize-winning 1994 novel of the same name by William Trevor. It was entered into the 1999 Cannes Film Festival and won four Genie Awards, including Best Adapted Screenplay.

== Plot ==
Felicia is an Irish teenager whose boyfriend, Johnny, has left to join the British Army after impregnating her. Taking a ferry to England, she begins a hopeless search for the lawnmower factory in Birmingham where she believes Johnny now works. Instead, she encounters Joseph Hilditch, a catering manager at a factory who is also the son of an eccentric TV chef of decades past. Hilditch regularly watches the old programmes of his presumably-deceased mother while he cooks her recipes and collects material about her. He offers to help Felicia find Johnny; however, his motives for doing so are initially unclear, and it is subsequently suggested through flashback sequences that he has befriended but then turned on vulnerable young women in the past.

Hilditch offers to drive Felicia to what he suggests is the factory she is looking for, which is on the way to the hospital where the unmarried Hilditch claims he is going to visit his wife. Felicia fails to find Johnny at the factory; while she is out of the car, Hilditch goes through her bags and steals her money. Subsequently, Felicia comes across a Jamaican Christian pedlar who offers Felicia a free overnight stay at a church hostel. While staying at the hostel, Felicia discovers that her money has gone and, after appearing to accuse others at the home of stealing the money, goes to Hilditch's house.

Meanwhile, Hilditch has traced Johnny to the barracks where he is serving, but does not disclose this to Felicia. He tells her that his wife has died and that she suggested that Felicia abort her unborn child. After the abortion, which Hilditch pays for, he takes her back to his house and gives her an overdose of sleeping pills. As she passes out, he explains that he has 'helped' many other vulnerable girls but 'lays them to rest' when they decide it is time to leave him.

While Hilditch is digging out in his garden, the Jamaican witness and a new convert enter his yard and begin to preach. The Christian reveals that Felicia had told her about Hilditch, saying he was a kind but troubled man. Hilditch feels flashes of guilt and confesses that he did, in fact, steal from and cheat Felicia so that she would return to him. He explains that he feels lonely, and the horrified Christians leave. Upstairs in the house, Felicia awakens from her sleep and struggles down the stairs. Hilditch finds her trying to escape but allows her to leave. He later walks to his kitchen, where he hangs himself with a pair of tights.

== Cast ==
- Bob Hoskins – Joe Hilditch
- Arsinée Khanjian – Gala
- Elaine Cassidy – Felicia
- Sheila Reid – Iris
- Nizwar Karanj – Sidney
- Ali Yassine – Customs Officer
- Peter McDonald – Johnny Lysaght
- Kriss Dosanjh – Salesman
- Gerard McSorley – Felicia's Father
- Marie Stafford – Felicia's Great Grandmother (as Máire Stafford)

== Release ==
Felicia's Journey was released on 8 October 1999 in the United Kingdom to "critical acclaim" according to the British Council. The film was previewed as closing film of the New York Film Festival on 10 October 1999 before being released on 12 November 1999 in the United States.

== Reception ==
=== Critical response ===
Felicia's Journey received positive reviews from critics. The film holds an 88% rating on review aggregator Rotten Tomatoes based on 41 reviews, with an average rating of 7.4/10. The consensus summarizes: "Felicia's Journey underscores its strange psychological thrills with captivating twists and a hauntingly calculated atmosphere." On Metacritic, the film holds a weighted average score of 72 out of 100 based on 34 reviews, indicating "generally favorable reviews".

The Observer critic Philip French noted it was the first "big screen" film set in Birmingham that he had ever seen.

Empire magazine critic Trevor Lewis noted it was "Beautiful, haunting, and chillingly powerful, this displays the usual Egoyan strengths, but suffers a little from his stylistic flourishes."

The New York Times film critic Stephen Holden noted Felicia's Journey was "restricted by its genre and by the limitations of its two main characters" but added that "Visually, and in its soundtrack of overlapping voices, the film sustains a mood of heightened consciousness, implying a world of surreal, only half-discernible connections in which weather, music, landscape, media and the chance encounters of strangers all suggest an enticing if slightly ominous sense of a grand design."

Writing in the Chicago Sun-Times, film critic Roger Ebert described it as having "Hitchcockian humor" and noted "You leave Felicia's Journey appreciating it. A week later, you're astounded by it."

=== Accolades ===
The film competed for the Palme d'Or at the 1999 Cannes Film Festival. It was nominated for 10 Genie Awards following the Academy of Canadian Cinema and Television's decision to revise rules allowing films with only a minority of Canadian involvement in production to compete, which also allowed Sunshine to be nominated for 14.

Award	Date of ceremony	Category	Recipient(s)	Result	Ref(s)
Genie Awards	30 January 2000	Best Motion Picture	Bruce Davey	Nominated	
Genie Awards	30 January 2000	Best Direction	Atom Egoyan	Nominated	
Genie Awards	30 January 2000	Best Actor	Bob Hoskins	Won	
Genie Awards	30 January 2000	Best Actress	Elaine Cassidy	Nominated	
Genie Awards	30 January 2000	Best Adapted Screenplay	Atom Egoyan	Won	
Genie Awards	30 January 2000	Best Cinematography	Paul Sarossy	Won	
Genie Awards	30 January 2000	Best Costume Design	Sandy Powell	Nominated	
Genie Awards	30 January 2000	Best Score	Mychael Danna	Won	
Genie Awards	30 January 2000	Best Sound	Daniel Pellerin, Keith Elliott, Peter Kelly and Brian Simmons	Nominated	
Genie Awards	30 January 2000	Best Sound Editing	Steve Munro, Sue Conley, Andy Malcolm, Tim Roberts and David Drainie Taylor	Nominated	
Satellite Awards	16 January 2000	Best Actress – Motion Picture, Drama	Elaine Cassidy	Nominated	
Toronto Film Critics Association	16 December 1999	Best Canadian Film		Runner-up	
