= The Children of Dynmouth =

1976 novel written by William Trevor

- First edition
- Author: William Trevor
- Language: English
- Genre: Novel
- Publisher: Bodley Head
- Publication date: 1976
- Publication place: Ireland
- Media type: Print (Hardcover & Paperback)
- Pages: 195 pp.
- ISBN: 978-0-141-04193-3

The Children of Dynmouth is a 1976 novel written by William Trevor. In 1976, it won the Whitbread Award.

== Plot summary ==
The plot follows Timothy Gedge, a socially inept yet intrusive teenage boy as he wanders around the dull seaside town of Dynmouth, spying on the town's residents. At first this behaviour is seen as merely annoying, even comical, until people begin to realise that his purpose may not be as innocent as initially thought.

== Television adaptation ==
Trevor adapted the novel into a screenplay for BBC Television's Screen Two series. It was directed by Peter Hammond, filmed on location in Sidmouth and broadcast on 19 April 1987. Timothy Gedge was played by Simon Fox, with John Bird, Avril Elgar, Peter Jones and Gary Raymond among the other members of the cast.
