= A Bit on the Side =

2004 short story collection by William Trevor

A Bit of the Side
- First edition
- Author: William Trevor
- Language: English
- Genre: Short story collection
- Publisher: Viking Press
- Publication date: 2004
- Publication place: Ireland
- Media type: Print (Hardcover & Paperback)
- Pages: 245 pp.
- ISBN: 978-0-14-190433-7

A Bit on the Side is a short story collection written by William Trevor, first published by Viking Press in 2004. It comprises twelve short stories arranged in the following order:

- "Sitting with the Dead"
- "Traditions"
- "Justina's Priest"
- "An Evening Out"
- "Graillis's Legacy"
- "Solitude"
- "Sacred Statues"
- "Rose Wept"
- "Big Bucks"
- "On the Streets"
- "The Dancing-Master's Music"
- "A Bit on the Side"

According to Kevin De Ornellas the stories collectively suggest "a distaste for modern, superficial culture". "A Bit on the Side" by Kevin De Ornellas, in The Facts on File Companion to the British Short Story, edited by Andrew Maunder, p. 34. Facts on File: 2007. ISBN 978-0816059904
