= Geoffrey Dennis =

English diplomat and writer (1892–1963)

Geoffrey Pomeroy Dennis (20 January 1892 – 15 May 1963) was an English diplomat and writer who won the Hawthornden Prize in 1930 for The End of the World. His Bloody Mary's (1934) is an autobiographical account of a young schoolboy in an English public school around the turn of the century.

Dennis served on the staff of the League of Nations in Geneva.

In 1937 he was sued for libel by Winston Churchill for insulting the future wife of Edward VIII, Wallis Simpson.

== Works ==
- Mary Lee, 1922
- Harvest in Poland, 1925, revised edition 1931
- Declaration of Love, 1927
- The End of the World, 1930
- Sale by Auction (The Red Room in the U.S.), 1932
- Bloody Mary's, 1934
- The Devil and X Y Z, 1937 (as by Barum Browne, with Hilary Saint George Saunders)
- Coronation Commentary, 1937
- Till Seven, 1957
