= Violet Brunton =

English sculptor, painter, and illustrator

- Born: Violet E.E. Brunton; 1878; Brighouse, United Kingdom
- Died: 1951 (aged 72–73)
- Known for: Painting, Illustration, Sculpture
- Spouse: W.H. Angless (m. 1930)

Violet Ella Evelyn Brunton (October 1878 – 1951), also known as Victor du Lac, was an English sculptor, painter, and illustrator.

== Biography ==
Violet E.E. Brunton was born in Brighouse, Yorkshire; her father, Arthur D. Brunton, was also an artist. She was educated at the Southport School of Art, the Liverpool School of Art, and finally, the Royal College of Art in London. She trained in woodcarving, miniature painting, and illustration. She won a County Palatine Scholarship and a City of Liverpool scholarship and a number of medals while still a student.

By 1903–04, Brunton's distinctive illustrations, drawings, and designs were being published in art magazines. During the 1920s, Brunton contributed illustrations to a number of books, including two volumes of fairy tales, edited by Romer Wilson. In her oil paintings, she tended towards classical and mythological subjects.

She exhibited work at the Royal Academy, the Royal Glasgow Institute, the Royal Society of Miniature Painters (to which she was elected in 1925), and elsewhere.

== Books illustrated by Brunton ==
- The Jeweller of Bagdad (1927, by Fritz Wittels)
- Ecclesiasticus: A Comment with Quotations (1927, by C. Lewis Hind)
- Green Magic (1928)
- Silver Magic (1929)

== Personal life ==
She married W.H. Angless, a musician, in 1930 and afterwards used the name Mrs. Brunton-Angless.
