= The Hill Bachelors =

2000 short story collection by William Trevor

- Author: William Trevor
- Language: English
- Publisher: Viking Press
- Publication date: 5 October 2000
- Publication place: United Kingdom
- Pages: 256
- ISBN: 9780141002170

The Hill Bachelors, published in 2000, is a short story collection by William Trevor.
