= Mrs. Eckdorf in O'Neill's Hotel =

1969 novel by William Trevor

- First edition
- Author: William Trevor
- Language: English
- Genre: Novel
- Publisher: The Bodley Head
- Publication date: 1969
- Publication place: Ireland
- Media type: Print (Hardcover & Paperback)
- Pages: 272 pp.
- ISBN: 978-0140107487
- Preceded by: The Love Department
- Followed by: Miss Gomez and the Brethren

Mrs. Eckdorf in O'Neill's Hotel is a novel written by William Trevor, shortlisted for the Booker Prize in 1970. It was first published by The Bodley Head in 1969.

== Plot summary ==
Mrs Ivy Eckdorf, a professional photographer with two unsuccessful marriages behind her, decides to visit Dublin's O'Neill's Hotel, after hearing that there are some dark secrets in the closet at the place. The hotel is owned by Mrs Sinnott, a compassionate deaf-mute lady fast approaching her ninety-second year. Her feckless son Eugene, a drunk and gambling addict, spends little on the upkeep of the hotel, and the place has now acquired a reputation as a somewhat seedy establishment: Morrissey, a local pimp, often arranges his clients' rendezvous with prostitutes in the rooms. With her feistiness and indefatigable spirit Mrs Eckdorf budges into the lives of the Sinnott family, O'Shea the hall porter and Father Hennessey, a Catholic priest of the local parish.

== Reception ==
A 1970 review in TIME magazine said that Trevor's novel "remains an entrancing but disturbing sketch of human weaknesses".
