= Penguin Great Loves =

Penguin Great Loves is a series of books published by Penguin Books in the UK.

== The books ==
Title	Author
A Mere Interlude	Thomas Hardy
A Russian Affair	Anton Chekhov
Bodily Secrets	William Trevor
Bonjour Tristesse	Françoise Sagan
Cures for Love	Stendhal
Deviant Love	Sigmund Freud
Doomed Love	Virgil
Eros Unbound	Anaïs Nin
First Love	Ivan Turgenev
Forbidden Fruit	Peter Abelard
Giovanni's Room	James Baldwin
Magnetism	F. Scott Fitzgerald
Mary	Vladimir Nabokov
Of Mistresses, Tigresses and Other Conquests	Giacomo Casanova
Something Childish But Very Natural	Katherine Mansfield
The Eaten Heart	Giovanni Boccaccio
The Kreutzer Sonata	Leo Tolstoy
The Seducer's Diary	Søren Kierkegaard
The Virgin and the Gypsy	D. H. Lawrence
The Women Who Got Away	John Updike

== See also ==
- Penguin Essentials
- Penguin Red Classics
