= Sue Prideaux =

Anglo-Norwegian writer

Sue Prideaux (born 1946) is an Anglo-Norwegian novelist and biographer.

== Life ==
Her grandmother was muse to the explorer Roald Amundsen and her godmother was painted by Edvard Munch, whose biography she later wrote under the title Edvard Munch: Behind the Scream.

She studied as an art historian. She has written biographies of August Strindberg, Thore Heramb, Friedrich Nietzsche, and Paul Gauguin, as well as fiction.

Her work appeared in the New Statesman.

== Awards ==
Awards for Prideaux's writing
| Year | Title | Award | Result | Ref. |
|---|---|---|---|---|
| 2005 | Edvard Munch: Behind the Scream | James Tait Black Memorial Prize | Winner | |
| 2012 | Strindberg: A Life | Samuel Johnson Prize | Shortlist | |
| 2012 | Strindberg: A Life | Duff Cooper Prize | Winner | |
| 2019 | I Am Dynamite! | Hawthornden Prize | Winner | |
| 2024 | Wild Thing: A Life of Paul Gauguin | Baillie Gifford Prize | Shortlist | |
| 2025 | Wild Thing: A Life of Paul Gauguin | Duff Cooper Prize | Winner | |

== Works ==
- Rude Mechanicals, Abacus, 1997
- Magnetic North, Little, Brown, 1998
- Edvard Munch: Behind the Scream, Yale University Press, 2005
- Thore Heramb, Labyrinth, 2006
- Strindberg: A Life, Yale University Press, 2012
- I Am Dynamite! A Life of Friedrich Nietzsche, Faber & Faber, 2018
- Wild Thing: A Life of Paul Gauguin, W. W. Norton, 2024
