= I Am Dynamite! =

2018 biography of Friedrich Nietzsche written by Sue Prideaux

- First edition (UK)
- Author: Sue Prideaux
- Subject: Biography
- Publisher: Faber & Faber (UK); Tim Duggan Books (US)
- Publication date: 2018
- Pages: 452

I Am Dynamite! A Life of Friedrich Nietzsche (Note: Published as I Am Dynamite! A Life of Nietzsche in the United States.) is a 2018 biography of Friedrich Nietzsche written by Sue Prideaux and published by Faber & Faber in 2018. It details the major events that occurred during his childhood through to his legacy.

It was The Times's 2018 biography of the year, as well as the winner of the Hawthornden Prize in 2019.

== Reviews ==
- Carey, John (September 23, 2018). "Review: I Am Dynamite! A Life of Friedrich Nietzsche by Sue Prideaux — unmasking philosophy's superman". The Sunday Times. ISSN 0140-0460.
- Derbyshire, Jonathan (October 12, 2018). "Friedrich Nietzsche, the immoralist". Financial Times.
- Drochon, Hugo (November 10, 2018). "I Am Dynamite! A Life of Friedrich Nietzsche review: A gripping read". The Irish Times.
- Hawes, James (September 29, 2018). "Nietzsche's intense friendship with Wagner forms the core of Sue Prideaux's excellent new biography". The Spectator.
- Hughes, Kathryn (November 21, 2018). "I Am Dynamite! by Sue Prideaux review – Nietzsche as we haven't known him before". The Guardian. ISSN 0261-3077.
- Monk, Ray (September 26, 2018). "The agony and the destiny: Friedrich Nietzsche's descent into madness". New Statesman.
- "Nietzsche, philosophy and madness". The Economist. October 25, 2018. ISSN 0013-0613.
- "Rev. of I Am Dynamite! By Sue Prideaux". Kirkus Reviews. July 31, 2018. ISSN 1948-7428.
- Rifkind, Hugo (September 22, 2018). "Review: I Am Dynamite! A Life of Friedrich Nietzsche by Sue Prideaux — mad, bad, but probably not a Nazi". The Times. ISSN 0140-0460.
- Robson, Leo (October 4, 2018). "The explosive life and times of a philosophical prodigy". Evening Standard.
- Volpert, Megan (September 7, 2018). "'I Am Dynamite!: A Life of Nietzsche' Parallels the Writing Style of Nietzsche Himself". PopMatters.
