= The Old Boys =

1964 comic novel by William Trevor

- First edition
- Author: William Trevor
- Language: English
- Genre: Novel
- Publisher: Bodley Head
- Publication date: 1964
- Publication place: Ireland
- Media type: Print (Hardcover & Paperback)
- Pages: 191 pp.
- ISBN: 014002428X
- Preceded by: A Standard of Behaviour
- Followed by: The Boarding House

The Old Boys is a 1964 comic novel written by Anglo-Irish author William Trevor.

== Plot summary ==
The story concerns a group of elderly men on the board of a society for the old boys of an unnamed English public school and the power politics and old rivalries that come into play during the election of a new president for the Old Boys Association. The old boys themselves have developed various ways of coping with retirement and loneliness and life's disappointments but they all take a keen interest in their old school, none more so than Jaraby, who desires and expects to be elected as the new president, but is nervous about the possibility of being opposed by Nox, his former fag.

== Reviews ==
- The New York Times
- The New Yorker
- The Telegraph
