= Peter Rushforth =

English teacher and novelist (1945–2005)

Peter Scott Rushforth (15 February 1945 – 25 September 2005) was an English teacher and novelist. He published only two novels in his lifetime; although they were separated by a quarter of a century, both were released to considerable critical acclaim. He died while on his weekly ramble with his friends, from his home in the village of Castleton on the North York Moors.

Rushforth was born in Gateshead in County Durham, but was raised in Leeds. He studied English at Hull University. After completing a teacher's training course at Nottingham, he became a full-time school teacher. He taught English for four years in Huddersfield, before joining Friends' School in Great Ayton, North Yorkshire. In due course, he would become Head of English at this school.

His first novel Kindergarten was published in 1979. Kindled by Rushforth's interest in the Holocaust, and in particular his discovery of a cache of pre-war letters from Jewish parents pleading for their children's safe passage, Kindergarten was a short and disturbing novel, a grim reworking of the fable of Hansel and Gretel from the canon of the Brothers Grimm. The book was hailed on both sides of the Atlantic. It received rave reviews in The New York Times, The Washington Post and the Los Angeles Times, while in Britain, it won the Hawthornden Prize, the oldest literary award in the UK. The Hawthornden, awarded annually for the "best work of imaginative literature", was particularly appropriate for the non-Jewish Rushforth who had written persuasively about the Holocaust.

The book then went out of print, and Rushforth was not to publish another novel for 25 years. Although he enjoyed teaching, it was a demanding job and he struggled to make time for his writing. In 1994, his friends took him on a trip to Brazil, and as Rushforth put it, "left me on a mountain for a month with nothing to do but write". A rough draft of 28,000 words came out of this enforced holiday. The following year, he quit his teaching job to concentrate full-time on his writing.

Rushforth's meticulous craftsmanship meant that he did not produce a final version of his second novel until 2002; it had taken him 15 drafts to get there. Pinkerton's Sister (2004), a vast and dense novel, over 700 pages compressed into a single day, described the fantastic inner life of Alice Pinkerton, a brilliant spinster who is regarded as somewhat crazy by the turn-of-the-century New York City society around her, but who lives in her own, richly detailed world of literature, fertile with allusions to Shakespeare, Wilde, Poe, Whitman, Stevenson, Tennyson, Austen, and many others. This book too was hailed by literary critics. Its subject matter and style – stream-of-consciousness narrative over a single day, packed with literary references, and producing a panoramic portrait of a society – even led some critics to draw parallels to James Joyce's great novel Ulysses.

Rushforth died just as his literary career was about to take off. His third novel, a follow-up to Pinkerton's Sister under the title A Dead Language, was published in the spring of 2006. Though Rushforth had planned three more novels after that, on a Sunday in September 2005; he had been walking on Blakey Ridge in the North Yorkshire Moors with his regular walking group when he suffered a heart attack.
