= Romer Wilson =

British writer (1891 – 1930)

Romer Wilson (born Florence Roma Muir Wilson (married name O'Brien); 26 December 1891 in Sheffield – 11 January 1930 in Lausanne) was a British writer who wrote about 13 novels during the inter-war period. In 1921, she won the Hawthornden Prize. She married American short-story anthologist Edward Joseph Harrington O'Brien in 1923.

== Early life ==
Florence Wilson was the daughter of Arnold Muir Wilson. She attended West Heath School (1906–10) and then began to study law at Girton College, Cambridge, the first women's college in Britain. In 1914, she completed her studies with moderate success. During the First World War she sold potatoes for the Board of Agriculture and Fisheries.

== Career ==
As a writer, she took the pseudonym of "Romer Wilson". During the war, she began writing her first novel Martin Schüler, which was published in 1919. In 1921, she received the Hawthornden Prize for the novel The Death of Society: Conte de Fée Premier.

In addition, she wrote Green Magic (1928), The Hill of Cloves (1929) and Red Magic (1930) which were collections of fairy tales from all over the world, and a biography about Emily Brontë entitled The Private Life And History Of Emily Jane Bronte (1928).

Storm Jameson, who helped manage Wilson for Blanche Knopf, described her novel Dragon's Blood as a prevision of Hitler's Nazi Europe. "In Romer Wilson, genius took the form of a short cut between her senses and her half-conscious mind."

== Personal life ==
Romer Wilson died from the effects of tuberculosis during a stay in Switzerland. She was 38.

== Selected works ==
- Martin Schüler (1919)
- If All These Young Men (1919)
- The Death of Society (1921)
- The Grand Tour of Alphonse Marichaud (1923)
- Dragon's Blood (pre-1926)
- Greenlow (1927)
- The Social Climbers (1927)
- Latterday Symphony (1927)
- All Alone: The Life and Private History of Emily Jane Brontë (1928)
- Green Magic (1928, illustrated by Violet Brunton)
- The Hill of Cloves (1929)
- Silver Magic (1929)
- Red Magic (1930)
