= Two Lives (novel) =

1991 novel by William Trevor

- First edition
- Author: William Trevor
- Language: English
- Publisher: Viking Press
- Publication date: 1 January 1991
- Publication place: Ireland
- Media type: Print (Hardcover & Paperback)
- Pages: 384 pp (hardcover)
- ISBN: 978-0-670-83933-9
- OCLC: 23384714

Two Lives (1991) consists of a pair of novellas by Irish writer William Trevor and published as a single book. The volume is composed of Reading Turgenev and My House in Umbria.

== Plot ==
Reading Turgenev deals with the life of Mary Louise Dallon, a farm girl from southeastern Ireland who marries an older draper named Elmer Quarry. Her marriage remains unconsummated, in part due to the growing alcoholism of her husband. She falls in love with her invalid cousin Robert, who introduces her to the works of great Russian writers (including Ivan Turgenev). She eventually goes mad and structures her life around preserving the existence of Robert to the finest detail possible, including re-creating his room and possessions in her attic.

In My House in Umbria, the first-person narrator, a retired prostitute and madam, now a writer of romantic novels, recollects a brief period when she sheltered in her Umbrian retirement villa three fellow survivors of a terrorist attack on an Italian passenger train. The novella has been made into a made-for-television film, also entitled My House in Umbria, which departs substantially from the somber plot of the original.

== Awards and nominations ==
Reading Turgenev was shortlisted for the Booker Prize in 1991.
