= Edward Joseph Harrington O'Brien =

American writer, poet, editor, and anthologist (1890–1941)

- Born: Edward Joseph Harrington O'Brien; December 10, 1890; Boston, Massachusetts, United States
- Died: February 24, 1941 (aged 50); Gerrards Cross, England
- Other name: Edward J. O'Brien
- Education: Harvard University (one year)
- Occupations: Short story anthologist, author
- Known for: Editor of Best Short Stories annuals
- Spouse(s): Romer Wilson (m. 1923) (died 1932); Ruth Gorgel (m. 1934)

Edward Joseph Harrington O'Brien (December 10, 1890 – February 24, 1941) was an American writer, poet, editor and anthologist.

As Edward J. O'Brien, he created a series of annual anthologies containing his selection of the previous year's best short stories by U.S. authors, The Best American Short Stories (originally The Best Short Stories of 1915, and so on). In that he was succeeded by Martha Foley, who continued the work until her own death in 1977 without a great change in format.

He went to live in Europe in 1919. He married his first wife, English writer Romer Wilson, in 1923. Two years after her death in 1932, he married German writer Ruth Gorgel, who survived him.

He died at his home in Gerrards Cross, England. The cause of death was heart failure. At the time, he was the European story editor for Metro-Goldwyn-Mayer's England studios.

== Books ==
=== As editor ===
- Poems of the Irish Revolutionary Brotherhood (1916) [with Padraic Colum]
- The Best Short Stories of 1915: and the Yearbook of the American Short Story (1916) [first in series]
- The Best Short Stories of 1916: and the Yearbook of the American Short Story (1917)
- The Masque of Poets: A Collection of New Poems by Contemporary American Poets (1918)
- The Best Short Stories of 1920 and the Yearbook of the American Short Story
- The Best British Short Stories of 1922 [with John Cournos] (1922) [first in series]
- The Best Short Stories of 1923: and the Yearbook of the American Short Story (1924)
- The Best British Short Stories of 1924 [with John Cournos]
- The Best Short Stories of 1926: and the Yearbook of the American Short Story (1926)
- The Best British Short Stories of 1928 (1928)
- The Best Short Stories of 1931: and the Yearbook of the American Short Story (1931)
- The Best Short Stories of 1932: and the Yearbook of the American Short Story (1932)
- Modern English Short Stories (1933)
- The Twenty-Five Finest Short Stories (1933)
- The Guest Book (1935)
- Elizabethan Tales (1937)
- 50 Best American Short Stories 1915-1939 (1939)
- The Best British Short Stories of 1939

=== As author ===
- The Advance of the American Short Story (1923)
- The Dance of the Machines: The American Short Story and the Industrial Age (1929)
- Son of the Morning: A Portrait of Friedrich Nietzsche (1932)

=== As contributor ===
- A Renegade Poet and Other Essays, by Francis Thompson (1910) [introduction]

== Articles ==
- "The American Short Story", The Writer, October 1935
- "The American Short Story—II", The Writer, November 1935
