= The Story of Lucy Gault =

2002 novel by William Trevor

- First edition
- Author: William Trevor
- Language: English
- Publisher: Viking Press
- Publication date: 2002
- Publication place: Ireland
- Media type: Print (Hardcover & Paperback)
- Pages: 240 pp.
- ISBN: 0670913421
- OCLC: 59446899

The Story of Lucy Gault is a novel written by William Trevor in 2002. The book is divided into three sections: the childhood, middle age and older times of the girl, Lucy. The story takes place in Ireland during the transition to the 21st century. It follows the protagonist Lucy and her immediate contacts. The book was shortlisted for the Booker and Whitbread Prizes in 2002.

== Plot summary ==
The novel begins with Lucy, on a night in 1921. She is the only child of an Anglo-Irish land owner on the coast of County Cork. It starts during the Irish War of Independence, when Loyalist Protestant landowners caught in the battle between the IRA and the British army had their houses burned. The place is under martial law and Captain Gault is disturbed by young arsonists from the nearby village. When he fires a warning shot with his old rifle, he injures a boy in the shoulder. Out of fear, the family plans to move to England. Lucy is not told why her family wishes to move and longs for the house she was kept from and the sea close by. On the eve of their departure, she hides in the woods. Due to a series of events, her parents are led to believe that she drowned in the sea.

By the time she is discovered, her parents are gone. She thus gets what she wished for, to live in the house, being taken care of by the house servants turned caretaker-farmers. Lucy lives a very lonely life, reading books and keeping bees. She feels very guilty about running away and thus feels that she deserves her loneliness. When another character, Ralph, tries to relieve her of her sad life, she feels that she cannot let him love her without, one of the characters opines, getting forgiveness from her parents. Her father returns after the Second World War, having spent the previous years in Italy and Switzerland, too late to salvage her happiness. They settle into an uneasy companionship, with too much unspoken.

Having lost the love of her life, she forms a bond with the person who was wounded by her father. Lucy spends many years visiting the asylum where the person is incarcerated in his confusion and his silence. Lucy in old age sees people with phones to their ears and hears on the wireless about the Internet, and wonders what it is.

== Reviews ==
- "Trevor's tragic tale" by William Gallagher, BBC, October 17, 2002, retrieved August 29, 2006
- "Myths that linger in the mind" by Hermione Lee, Guardian, August 31, 2002, retrieved August 29, 2006
