= William Trevor =

Irish writer (1928-2016)

William Trevor KBE
- Born: William Trevor Cox; 24 May 1928; Mitchelstown, County Cork, Ireland
- Died: 20 November 2016 (aged 88); Crediton, Devon, England
- Citizenship: Irish
- Education: Trinity College, Dublin
- Occupations: Novelist, short story writer
- Writing career
- Pen name: William Trevor
- Language: English
- Notable works: The Old Boys; The Boarding House; Mrs. Eckdorf in O'Neill's Hotel; The Children of Dynmouth; Fools of Fortune; Two Lives; Felicia's Journey; The Story of Lucy Gault; Love and Summer; The Dressmaker's Child
- Notable awards: Hawthornden Prize for Literature; 1964 Whitbread Prize; 1976, 1983, 1994; Jacob's Award; 1982; Companion of Literature; 1994; David Cohen Prize; 1999; Irish PEN Award; 2002; Kerry Group Irish Fiction Award; 2003 Bob Hughes Lifetime Achievement Award in Irish Literature; 2008

Autograph of William Trevor

William Trevor Cox KBE (24 May 1928 – 20 November 2016) was an Irish novelist, playwright, and short story writer. One of the elder statesmen of the Irish literary world, he is widely regarded as one of the greatest contemporary writers of short stories in the English language. Trevor won the Whitbread Prize three times and was nominated five times for the Booker Prize, the last for his novel Love and Summer (2009), which was also shortlisted for the International Dublin Literary Award in 2011. His name was also mentioned in relation to the Nobel Prize in Literature.

Trevor won the 2008 International Nonino Prize in Italy. In 2014, he was bestowed with the title of Saoi within Aosdána. He resided in England from 1954 until his death in 2016, at the age of 88.

== Biography ==
He was born as William Trevor Cox in Mitchelstown, County Cork, Ireland, to a middle-class, Anglo-Irish Protestant (Church of Ireland) family. He moved several times to other provincial locations, including Skibbereen, Tipperary, Youghal and Enniscorthy, as a result of his father's work as a bank official.

He was educated at a succession of schools including St Columba's College, Dublin (where he was taught by Oisín Kelly) and at Trinity College Dublin, from which he received a degree in history. Trevor worked as a sculptor under the name Trevor Cox after he graduated from Trinity College, supplementing his income by teaching.

He married Jane Ryan in 1952 and emigrated to England, working as a teacher, a sculptor and then as a copywriter for an advertising agency. During this time he and his wife had their first son. In 1952 he became an art teacher at Bilton Grange, a prep school near Rugby. Trevor was commissioned to carve reliefs for several churches, including All Saints, Braunston, Northamptonshire. In 1956 he moved to Somerset to work as a sculptor and carried out commissions for churches. He stopped wood carving in 1960.

His first novel, A Standard of Behaviour, was published in 1958 (by Hutchinson of London), but received little critical success. He later disowned this work, and, according to his obituary in The Irish Times, "refused to have it republished". It was, in fact, republished in 1982 and in 1989.

In 1964, at the age of 36, Trevor was awarded the Hawthornden Prize for The Old Boys. This success encouraged Trevor to become a full-time writer.

In 1971, he and his family moved from London to Devon in South West England, first to Dunkeswell, then in 1980 to Shobrooke, where he lived until his death. Despite having spent most of his life in England, he considered himself to be "Irish in every vein".

William Trevor died peacefully in his sleep on 20 November 2016. He was 88 years old.

== Works and themes ==
He wrote several collections of short stories that were well-received. His short stories often follow a Chekhovian pattern. The characters in Trevor's work are typically marginalized members of society: children, the elderly, single middle-aged men and women, or the unhappily married. Those who cannot accept the reality of their lives create their own alternative worlds into which they retreat. A number of the stories use Gothic elements to explore the nature of evil and its connection to madness. Trevor acknowledged the influence of James Joyce on his short-story writing, and "the odour of ashpits and old weeds and offal" can be detected in his work, but the overall impression is not of gloominess, since, particularly in his early work, the author's wry humour offers the reader a tragicomic version of the world. He adapted much of his work for stage, television and radio. In 1990, Fools of Fortune was made into a film directed by Pat O'Connor, followed by a 1999 film adaptation of Felicia's Journey, which was directed by Atom Egoyan.

Trevor set his stories in both England and Ireland; they range from black comedies to tales based on Irish history and politics. A common theme is the tension between Protestant (usually Church of Ireland) landowners and Catholic tenants. His early books are peopled by eccentrics who speak in a pedantically formal manner and engage in hilariously comic activities that are recounted by a detached narrative voice. Instead of one central figure, the novels feature several protagonists of equal importance, drawn together by an institutional setting, which acts as a convergence point for their individual stories. The later novels are thematically and technically more complex. The operation of grace in the world is explored, and several narrative voices are used to view the same events from different angles. Unreliable narrators and different perspectives reflect the fragmentation and uncertainty of modern life. Trevor also explored the decaying institution of the "Big House" in his novels Fools of Fortune and The Story of Lucy Gault.

== Awards and honours ==
Trevor was a member of the Irish Academy of Letters and Aosdána. He was awarded an honorary CBE in 1977 for "services to literature", and was made a Companion of Literature in 1994. In 2002 he received an honorary KBE in recognition of his services to literature. He won the 2008 International Nonino Prize in Italy.

Trevor was nominated for the Booker Prize five times, making the shortlist in 1970, 1976, 1991 and 2002, and the longlist in 2009. He won the Whitbread Prize three times and the Hawthornden Prize once.

Since 2002, when non-American authors became eligible to compete for the O. Henry Award, Trevor won the award four times, for his stories Sacred Statues (2002), The Dressmaker's Child (2006), The Room (2007), a juror favourite of that year, and Folie à Deux (2008).

Trevor was shortlisted for the International Dublin Literary Award in 2011.

=== Literary wins and nominations ===
- 1965: Hawthornden Prize for The Old Boys
- 1970: Mrs. Eckdorf in O'Neill's Hotel was shortlisted for the Booker Prize
- 1975: Royal Society of Literature for Angels at the Ritz and Other Stories
- 1976: Whitbread Award for The Children of Dynmouth
  - Allied Irish Banks Prize for fiction
  - Heinemann Award
  - Shortlisted for the Booker Prize
- 1980: Giles Cooper Award for Beyond the Pale
- 1982: Giles Cooper Award for Autumn Sunshine
- 1982: Jacob's Award for TV adaptation of The Ballroom of Romance
- 1983: Whitbread Prize for Fools of Fortune
- 1991: Reading Turgenev was shortlisted for the Booker Prize
- 1994: Whitbread Prize Best Novel for Felicia's Journey
- 1999: David Cohen Prize by the Arts Council England in recognition of his work.
- 2001: Irish Literature Prize
- 2002: Irish PEN Award
- 2002: The Story of Lucy Gault was shortlisted for the Booker Prize and the Whitbread Book Award
- 2003: Kerry Group Irish Fiction Award at the Listowel Writers' Week
- 2008: Bob Hughes Lifetime Achievement Award in Irish Literature

== Legacy ==
A monument to William Trevor was unveiled in Trevor's native Mitchelstown on 25 August 2004. It is a bronze sculpture by Liam Lavery and Eithne Ring in the form of a lectern, with an open book incorporating an image of the writer and a quotation, as well as the titles of his three Whitbread Prize-winning works, and two others of significance.

On 23 May 2008, the eve of his 80th birthday, a commemorative plaque, indicating the house on Upper Cork Street, Mitchelstown, where Trevor was born, was unveiled by Louis McRedmond.

== Bibliography ==
=== Novels and novellas ===
- A Standard of Behaviour (Hutchinson, 1958)
- The Old Boys (The Bodley Head, 1964)
- The Boarding House (The Bodley Head, 1965)
- The Love Department (The Bodley Head, 1966)
- Mrs Eckdorf in O'Neill's Hotel (The Bodley Head, 1969)
- Miss Gomez and the Brethren (The Bodley Head, 1971)
- Elizabeth Alone (The Bodley Head, 1973)
- The Children of Dynmouth (The Bodley Head, 1976)
- Other People's Worlds (The Bodley Head, 1980)
- Fools of Fortune (The Bodley Head, 1983)
- Nights at the Alexandra (Hutchinson, 1987)
- The Silence in the Garden (The Bodley Head, 1988)
- Two Lives (the two novellas Reading Turgenev and My House in Umbria) (Viking Press, 1991)
- Felicia's Journey (Viking, 1994)
- Death in Summer (Viking, 1998)
- The Story of Lucy Gault (Viking, 2002)
- Love and Summer (Viking, 2009)
- The Dressmaker's Child (Penguin Books)

=== Short story collections ===
- The Day We Got Drunk on Cake and Other Stories (The Bodley Head, 1967)
- The Ballroom of Romance and Other Stories (The Bodley Head, 1972)
- The Last Lunch of the Season (Covent Garden Press, 1973)
- Angels at the Ritz and Other Stories (The Bodley Head, 1975)
- Old School Ties (Lemon Tree Press, 1976)
- Lovers of their Time (The Bodley Head, 1978)
- The Distant Past (Poolbeg Press, 1979)
- Beyond the Pale (The Bodley Head, 1981)
- The Stories of William Trevor (Penguin, 1983)
- The News from Ireland and Other Stories (The Bodley Head, 1986)
- Family Sins and Other Stories (The Bodley Head, 1989)
- Outside Ireland: Selected Stories (Viking, 1992)
- The Collected Stories (Viking, 1992; Penguin, 1993, 2003)
- After Rain (Viking, 1996)
- Cocktails at Doney's (Bloomsbury Classics, 1996)
- The Hill Bachelors (2000) ISBN 978-0141002170
- A Bit On the Side (Viking, 2004) ISBN 978-0143035916
- Cheating at Canasta (Viking, 2007) ISBN 978-0670018376
- Bodily Secrets (Penguin Great Loves, 2007; new selection of stories from earlier collections) ISBN 978-0141033235
- The Collected Stories (Viking, 2009) ISBN 978-0140232455.
- Selected Stories (Viking, 2010), listed as "the second volume of his collected stories" ISBN 978-0-670-02206-9.
- Last Stories (Viking, 2018)

=== Short fiction ===
Title	Year	First published in	Reprinted/collected in	Notes
The third party	1986	Trevor, William (14 April 1986). "The third party". The New Yorker. Vol. 62, no. 8. pp. 35–44.		
The women	2013	Trevor, William (14 January 2013). "The women". The New Yorker.		

=== Drama ===
- Out of the Unknown: "Walk's End" (1966)
- Play for Today: O Fat White Woman (1971, adaptation from short story)
- The Old Boys (Davis-Poynter, 1971)
- A Night with Mrs da Tanka (Samuel French, 1972)
- Going Home (Samuel French, 1972)
- Marriages (Samuel French, 1973)
- The Ballroom of Romance (Pat O’Connor, 1982)
- Going Home (Samuel French, 1972)

=== Children's books ===
- Juliet's Story (The O'Brien Press, Dublin, 1991)
- Juliet's Story (Bodley Head, 1992)

=== Non-fiction ===
- A Writer's Ireland: Landscape in Literature (Thames & Hudson, 1984)
- Excursions in the Real World: memoirs (Hutchinson, 1993)

=== As editor ===
- The Oxford Book of Irish Short Stories (Oxford University Press, 1989)

== See also ==
- List of honorary British knights and dames
- List of winners and nominated authors of the Booker Prize

== Sources ==
- Mary Fitzgerald-Hoyt (2003). William Trevor: re-imagining Ireland. Liffey Press. ISBN 978-1-904148-06-7.
- Dolores MacKenna (1999). William Trevor: the writer and his work. New Island Books. ISBN 978-1-874597-74-2.
- McAlindon, Tom (2003). "Tragedy, history, and myth: William Trevor's Fools of Fortune". Irish University Review: A Journal of Irish Studies.
- Stephanie McBride; Irish Film Institute (2006). Felicia's Journey. Cork University Press. ISBN 978-1-85918-399-1.
- Kristin Morrison (1993). William Trevor. Twayne Publishers. ISBN 978-0-8057-7032-2.
- Hugh Ormsby-Lennon (2005). Fools of fiction: reading William Trevor's stories. Maunsel & Co. ISBN 978-1-930901-21-6.
- Gregory A. Schirmer (1990). William Trevor: Study of His Fiction. Routledge. ISBN 978-0-415-04493-6.
