= 1919 Birthday Honours (OBE) =

This is a list of Officer of the Order of the British Empire (OBE) awards in the 1919 Birthday Honours.

The 1919 Birthday Honours were appointments by King George V to various orders and honours to reward and highlight good works by citizens of the British Empire. The appointments were made to celebrate the official birthday of The King, and were published in The London Gazette from 3 June to 12 August. The vast majority of the awards were related to the recently ended War, and were divided by military campaigns. A supplementary list of honours, retroactive to the King's birthday, was released in December 1919.

== Officer of the Order of the British Empire (OBE) awards ==
=== Military Division ===
==== For valuable services rendered in connection with military operations in the Aden Peninsula ====
- Maj. Ian Macpherson Macrae Indian Medical Service
- Capt. Gerald Gozens Pullman, 6th Battalion East Surrey Regiment
- Mabel Anna Stroughill RRC Senior Nursing Sister, Queen Alexandra's Imperial Military Nursing Service

==== For services rendered in connection with military operations in the Balkans ====
- Temp Capt. Albert Roland Anderson, Royal Army Service Corps
- Temp Maj. George Denholm Armour, Army Remount Service
- Capt. William Arnot, Cameron Highlanders
- Maj. Cecil Charles Gough Ashton, East Surrey Regiment
- Temp Capt. Wesley Barritt
- Capt. Thomas Clement Erskine Barstow, 27th Gurkha Rifles, Indian Army
- Temp Maj. Bertram Claude Barton, Royal Army Service Corps
- Capt. and Bt. Maj. Frank William Beall, Royal Army Service Corps
- Maj. William Henry Bingham, 1/69th Battalion Punjabis, Indian Army
- Temp Maj. Reginald George Breadmore, Royal Army Service Corps
- Rev. Eric Hugh Brereton, Royal Army Chaplains' Department
- Temp Maj. Norman Howarth Brierley, Royal Engineers
- Temp Maj. William Brock, Devonshire Regiment
- Temp Capt. Albert James Studd Brown, Royal Fusiliers
- Temp Capt. Reginald William Burn, Royal Army Service Corps
- Capt. Arthur Bernard Butterworth, Royal Army Service Corps
- Capt. and Bt. Maj. David Bannerman Burt-Marshall DSO Seaforth Highlanders
- Maj. Donald Cunninghame Cameron, Royal Army Service Corps
- Capt. Malcolm Hay Alexander Campbell, 1/8 Punjabis, Indian Army
- Lt. John MacKnight Campbell MC Royal Scots
- Capt. Arthur Skedling Cane Royal Army Medical Corps
- Capt. and Bt. Maj. Charles Alexander Cardwell, Oxfordshire and Buckinghamshire Light Infantry
- Temp Maj. and Bt. Lt.-Col. Hon Dudley Massey Pigott Carleton
- Temp Maj. Leonard James Castle MC Duke of Cornwall's Light Infantry
- Rev. Frank Hanson Chambers, Royal Army Chaplains' Department
- Temp Maj. Francis Jervoise Collas MC Royal Jersey Artillery
- Maj. Harry Rollo Crailsham, Scottish Rifles
- Temp Capt. Thomas Daily Cumberland Royal Army Medical Corps
- Temp Maj. John Ernest Moncrieff Cuthbertson, Royal Army Service Corps
- Doctor Elsie Jean Dalyell, Royal Army Medical Corps
- Temp Capt. Alexander White Darby, Labour Corps
- Rev. David Davies, Royal Army Chaplains' Department
- Capt. Archibald Sholto George Douglas, Rifle Brigade
- Temp Maj. Harry Melville Edwards, Worcestershire Regiment
- Capt. Hector Charles Ellis, Middlesex Regiment
- Temp Maj. Philip Remington England, Royal Army Service Corps
- Capt. Harold Arthur Thomas Fairbank DSO FRCS Royal Army Medical Corps
- Rev. Fergus Ferguson, Royal Army Chaplains' Department
- Capt. Cuthbert Edmund Caulfield Ferry, Royal Army Medical Corps
- Temp Maj. Phillip Henry Fish, Royal Army Service Corps
- Quartermaster and Lt.-Col. James Joseph Fox, Royal Irish Regiment
- Capt. Walter Longueville Giffard, Leicestershire Regiment
- Temp Capt. George Godwin, Labour Corps
- Quartermaster and Temp Capt. George Goodwin, Royal Engineers
- Temp Maj. William Richard Gosling, Welsh Regiment
- Temp Maj. Arthur Trevor Gough MC Royal Field Artillery
- Capt. Francis George Hearne, Royal Army Service Corps
- Capt. Thomas Shirley Hele, Royal Army Medical Corps
- Lt. John Gilbert Henderson MC Royal Engineers
- Temp Capt. Walter Heurtley
- Maj. Alfred Siegfried Holme, Royal Engineers
- Capt. Thomas George Holland, Labour Corps, Indian Army
- Capt. Frank Hopkin, Royal Army Veterinary Corps
- Capt. William Herbert Gascoigne Horn, Royal Army Service Corps
- Capt. and Bt. Maj. James Nockells Horlick MC Coldstream Guards
- Capt. Robert Hugh Holmes Jackson, East Surrey Regiment
- Lt..Col. Herbert Ellison Rhodes James CB CMG FRCS Royal Army Medical Corps
- Capt. Aaron Jameson, East Yorkshire Regiment
- Temp Capt. Alexander Harvey Morro Jamieson, Royal Garrison Artillery
- Temp Lt. Thomas Stanley Wiles Jarvis MBE Manchester Regiment
- Temp Capt. John Arnold Jones, Royal Army Medical Corps
- Maj. Alexander Edward Kidd, Royal Army Medical Corps
- Temp Lt.-Col. Lewis Hawker Kirkness DSO
- Quartermaster and Capt. Alfred John Hammond Knight, Royal Army Medical Corps
- Quartermaster and Capt. Albert Ernest Langley, Royal Army Service Corps
- Temp Capt. Nigel Clere Leatham, Royal Army Service Corps
- Doctor Elizabeth Herdman Lepper, Royal Army Medical Corps
- Capt. Leslie Jabez Lightfoot, Army Pay Department
- Capt. Charles Alfred Lucas, Royal Army Service Corps
- Temp Capt. John Alfred Lucie-Smith
- Temp Capt. Sidney Ivor Luck, Royal Engineers
- Capt. Arthur Nevin Lyle, Royal Engineers
- Rev. Charles Henry Preston Lyndon, Royal Army Chaplains' Department
- Capt. Alieter Maxwell MacDonnell, Royal Army Service Corps
- Capt. James St. Cuthbert MacGregor, Royal Field Artillery
- Temp Maj. Ronald Charles MacNab, Royal Army Ordnance Corps
- Temp Capt. Loudon Hope MacQueen, Royal Army Veterinary Corps
- Temp Capt. Arthur Lambert Marlow, Labour Corps
- Capt. Ian McLeod Angus Matheson, Lothians and Border Horse
- Capt. Henry Maurice Michie, Scottish Horse
- Rev. John Lloyd Milne, Royal Army Chaplains' Department
- Maj. George Philip Morris, 30th Lancers, Indian Army
- Temp Capt. John Norman Morrison, Army Rean. Service
- Rev. James Reginald de Courcy O'Grady Murley, Royal Army Chaplains' Department
- Temp Capt. Ryder Percival Nash, Royal Army Medical Corps
- Capt. George William Nasmith, Manchester Regiment
- Capt. Joseph Neill, Royal Garrison Artillery
- Temp Capt. Frank Newey, Royal Army Medical Corps
- Rev. Thomas Francis O'Brien, Royal Army Chaplains' Department
- Maj. Henry Clement Pauncefort-Munday, Rifle Brigade
- Capt. Ernest Snowden Wallace Peatt, Royal Army Veterinary Corps
- Capt. Richard Hugh Penhale, Royal Army Veterinary Corps
- Temp Maj. Richard Graham Pritchard, Royal Engineers
- Temp Lt. John Ranisboittom MBE
- Temp Quartermaster and Capt. Frederick Richardson, Royal Army Medical Corps
- Temp Maj. Cyril Ellett Robinson, Royal Garrison Artillery
- Capt. Reginald Stanley Ronald, Royal Army Service Corps
- Temp Capt. John Wentworth Rooke, Royal Wiltshire Yeomanry
- Capt. Harry Roscoe, Royal Garrison Artillery
- Temp Capt. John Allan Rule, Devonshire Regiment
- Temp Capt. John Augustus Saunders, Royal Army Service Corps
- Rev. Harold Gordon Sellers, Royal Army Chaplains' Department
- Temp Maj. Harry Alexander Smythe, Royal Army Service Corps
- Maj. Thomas South, Middlesex Regiment
- Temp Maj. John Edward Spurway, Royal Army Service Corps
- Capt. and Bt. Maj. Stanley Stericker, Scottish Horse Yeomanry
- Maj. and Bt. Lt.-Col. Claude Bayfield Stokes CIE Indian Army
- Temp Capt. Leslie Eric Sheldon Stokes, Royal Field Artillery
- Temp Capt. James Robert Stott, Royal Army Medical Corps
- Temp Capt. Herbert Marmaduke Joseph Stourton
- Temp Capt. Basil Wilford Taylor, Royal Artillery
- Lt. Olive Errington Temperley MC Rifle Brigade
- Maj. John Pickering Thompson, 25th Scinde Horse, Indian Army
- Temp Capt. Maurice Scott Thompson
- Capt. Percival Walter Thorogood, London Regiment
- Capt. Peter Ralph Alwen Thrale, Royal Army Veterinary Corps
- Capt. and Bt. Maj. Edmund Samuel Waite Tidswell DSO Leicestershire Regiment
- Capt. Eustace Mandeville Wetenhall Tillyard, Royal Lancaster Regiment
- Temp Maj. Wilfred Irwin Travers, Royal Engineers
- Capt. and Bt. Maj. Claude Lechmere St. John Tudor MC Royal Army Service Corps
- Capt. Frank Forbes Tweedie, Royal Engineers
- Capt. Reginald Martin Vick, Royal Army Medical Corps
- Temp Lt.-Col. Henry Clifford Wallis, Royal Army Service Corps
- Temp Capt. James Warnock, Royal Army Medical Corps
- Temp Maj. Arthur Warren-Lambert, Royal Army Service Corps
- Capt. Roger John Watts, Worcestershire Yeomanry
- Temp Capt. Charles Henry White, Royal Army Service Corps
- Lt.-Col. Henry Wilson, Royal Army Service Corps
- Temp Maj. Harold Waterlow Wiltshire DSO Royal Army Medical Corps
- Capt. Lionel Dudley Woods, Royal Army Medical Corps
- Temp Capt. Walter Edward Wort, Royal Army Ordnance Corps
- Temp Maj. James Wright, Royal Engineers
- Temp Capt. Frederick Hugh Royal Army Medical Corps
- Temp Capt. William Alexander Young, Royal Engineers

Canadian Forces

- Maj. Harold Kenzie Newcombe, Manitoba Regiment

South African Overseas Forces

- Temp Capt. Herbert Glyn Chevens, SA Defence Force

==== For valuable services rendered in connection with military operations in East Africa ====
- Temp Capt. Neale Andrews, Royal Army Service Corps
- Capt. Herbert Benjamin Atkinson, East African Forces
- Capt. William Chalmers, Royal Army Ordnance Corps, King's African Rifles, East African Forces
- Capt. Percival Lorimer Collision
- Temp Capt. Arthur Paul Dashwood, Royal Engineers
- Capt. Herbert Lyndhurst Duke, Uganda M.S
- Capt. Robert Bleeck Leech Harvey, Royal Berkshire Regiment, attd. King's African Rifles
- Capt. Sydney Joseph Verner Furlong Royal Army Medical Corps
- Maj. John Lawton Hardy, Labour Corps, East African Forces
- Capt. Henry Albert Gravious Jeffreys, Army Pay Corps, East African Forces
- Temp Capt. Percy John Jennings, Royal Engineers
- Maj. Thomas William. Hathway Jones, Indian Army
- Capt. James Dunlop Kidd MC Royal Army Medical Corps
- Capt. Ernest Harry Thorn Lawrence, Connaught Rangers
- Maj. John Douglas Leonard MBE labour Corps, East African Forces
- Capt. Frederick Herbert James Marshall, Rifle Brigade
- Temp Maj. James Thomas Montgomery, Nyasaland Field Force
- Temp Capt. Leslie Mortimer, Royal Army Service Corps
- Temp Maj. Charles Ernest Muggeridge MC
- Rev Walter Sutton Page Royal Army Chaplains' Department
- Capt. Edward Henry Banks Palmer, East African Forces
- Lt. Arthur Charles Cosmo Parkinson, attd. East African Rifles
- Capt. John Paterson, Labour Corps, East African Forces
- Rev Peter Rogan, Royal Army Chaplains' Department
- Maj. Alexander Russell MC labour Corps, East African Forces
- Temp Maj. Bernard William Shilson, Royal Army Service Corps
- Temp Capt. Geoffrey Lionel Smith, King's African Rifles
- Capt. Harold Josiah Solomon MC Royal Army Service Corps
- Capt. Andrew McCrae Watson, East African Forces
- Maj. Charles Scott Moncreiff Chalmers Watson DSO Royal Engineers
- Capt. Arthur Cecil Whitehorne, Welsh Regiment, attd. King's African Rifles
- Temp Maj. Arthur Donald John Bedwood Williams, attd. East African Forces
- Temp Capt. Arthur Charles Willmot, King's African Rifles
- Temp Capt. William James Primet Woakes, Royal Army Service Corps

South African Forces

- Maj. James Cecil Bateman, SA Pay Corps
- Capt. Rudolph John Bell MC SA Service Corps
- Temp Maj. Bernard Heatherington Bromilow, SA Service Corps
- Maj. Robert Murray Dunbar MC SA Service Corps
- Maj. William Vincent Field, SA Medical Corps
- Temp Lt.-Col. Jack Grinsell, SA Medical Corps
- Lt.-Col. Earnest Whitmore Newton Guinness, Railway Corps, SA Force
- Capt. Henry Epton Hornby, SA Veterinary Corps
- Temp Capt. Courteney Charles Hosken, SA Service Corps
- Capt. George Ronald, SA Service Corps
- Maj. George James Tharton Thornton, Rhodesia Native Regiment

==== For valuable service rendered in connection with military operations in France ====
- Temp Lt. Edwin Plimpton Adams, Royal Engineers
- Temp Lt. Thomas Henry Adams, Royal Engineers
- Temp Capt. Sidney Alban-Uff, Royal Army Service Corps
- Maj. Evelyn Aldridge, Royal Garrison Artillery
- Temp Capt. Philip George Alexandra, Yorkshire Regiment
- Lt. Sidney Ernest Alford MC Royal Field Artillery
- Capt. Richard Ley Allan, East Lancashire Regiment, attd. Royal Engineers
- Temp Capt. Philip Allard, Royal Marine Light Infantry
- Maj. Bryce Allan, Royal Garrison Artillery
- Temp Capt. Francis John Allen MC Royal Army Medical Corps
- Temp Capt. Frederick John Allen, Royal Army Service Corps
- Temp Capt. Francis Henry Middleton Anderson, Royal Army Service Corps
- Maj. James Douglas Anderson, Royal Garrison Artillery
- Capt. Neil Gordon Anderson, Royal Army Service Corps
- Maj. Robert Gray Anderson, Royal Army Veterinary Corps
- Temp Capt. Thomas Andrew Irving Anderson, Royal Army Veterinary Corps
- Temp Capt. William Anderson FRCS Royal Army Medical Corps
- Capt. Wilfred Arthur Duncombe Anderson, Labour Corps
- Capt. and Bt. Maj. George Lionel Andrew
- Temp Capt. William Brodie Gurney Angus MC Royal Army Medical Corps
- Temp Capt. Alexander Frederick Aris, Royal Army Service Corps
- Capt. Samuel Richard Armstrong, Royal Army Medical Corps
- Temp Lt.-Col. Godfrey George Armstrong MC
- Capt. Sereld John Armstrong MC Royal Engineers
- Temp 2nd Lt. Ernest Ash, Labour Corps
- Quartermaster and Capt. Frederick Henry Ashford, Royal Engineers
- Temp Capt. Reginald Guy Attwood, Royal Engineers
- Temp Lt. Cyril William Bacon, Royal Army Ordnance Corps
- Maj. William Merciless Baird, Argyll and Sutherland Highlanders
- Temp Capt. Arthur Frederick Baker, Royal Army Service Corps
- Temp Maj. Herbert Baker, Royal Army Service Corps
- Lt. Joseph Samuel Baker, Leinster Regiment
- Maj. Dudley Vere Morley Balders MC Suffolk Regiment
- Temp Capt. Harry Standish Ball, Royal Engineers
- Temp Lt. Gilbert Alfred Ballard, Royal Engineers
- Rev. Austen Humphrey Balleine, Royal Army Chaplains' Department
- Capt. Hugh Scott Barrett, Liverpool Regiment
- Lt.-Col. Cyril Alexander Barron, Royal Army Service Corps
- Temp Capt. John Hewitt Barry, Royal Army Service Corps
- Temp Capt. Oharles Percival Barton, Royal Army Service Corps
- Temp Capt. Ernest Francis Bashford, Royal Army Medical Corps
- Temp Capt. Arthur Batchelor, Royal Army Service Corps
- Capt. Hubert Tunstall Bates, Royal Army Medical Corps
- Lt. Herbert Mackenzie Batson, Devonshire Regiment, attd. Labour Corps
- Capt. Edgar Douglas Batty
- Temp Capt. Frederick Henry Bawden, Labour Corps
- Temp Capt. Arthur Baxter, Royal Army Service Corps
- Capt. David Charles Baxter, Royal Army Medical Corps
- Capt. Henry Cuthbert Bazett MC Royal Army Medical Corps
- Temp Quartermaster and Capt. Sydney Thomas Beard, Royal Army Medical Corps
- Temp Maj. William John Beatty, Royal Army Service Corps
- Quartermaster and Maj. Henry George Beaumont, Royal Army Service Corps
- Temp Lt. Philip Ernest Beavis, Royal Artillery
- Capt. Roland Harry Bebb
- Temp Capt. Charles Stephenscn Beckett
- Temp Capt. Thomas Cannichael Bell
- Capt. William Lloyd Bemrose, Nottinghamshire and Derbyshire Regiment
- Capt. Bernard John Taylor Bennette
- Capt. and Bt. Maj. Norman Carmichael Bennett MC Argyll and Sutherland Highlanders
- Quartermaster and Capt. Thomas William Bennett, Border Regiment
- Lt.-Col. William Bennett DSO Royal Army Medical Corps
- Lt. Hugh Benson, Royal Field Artillery
- Temp Maj. George Augustus Benson DCM Royal Army Medical Corps
- Temp Capt. Gerald Waddington Beresford, Royal Army Medical Corps
- Temp Lt. Oliver Percy Bernard MC Royal Engineers
- Capt. Winslow Seymour Sterling Berry, Royal Army Medical Corps
- Temp Capt. Sigismund Payne Best
- Lt. Calverly Bewicke MC Scots Guards
- Lt. Alfred James Biddulph MC Royal Field Artillery
- Capt. William Charles Bigg, Royal Army Service Corps
- Temp Capt. Montague Birch, Royal Army Service Corps
- Temp Lt. William Kenning Birch
- Capt. Ronald Trevor Wilberforce Bird
- Temp Maj. Lionel Oddy Gaskell Blackburn, Royal Army Service Corps
- Capt. and Bt. Maj. Harold Henry Blake, Royal Army Medical Corps
- Maj. William Lascelles Fitzgerald Blake, Royal Fusiliers
- Temp Capt. William Edward Bliss, Royal Army Service Corps
- Maj. Gerald Charles Gordon Blunt DSO Royal Army Service Corps
- Quartermaster and Maj. Henry Boag, Dragoon Guards
- Capt. Arthur Beaumont Boggs, 29th Lancers, Indian Army
- Mildred Mary Bond RRC Acting Principal Matron, Queen Alexandra's Imperial Military Nursing Service
- Temp Maj. William Cotsworth Bond, Labour Corps
- Temp Maj. John Edward Bostock, Royal Engineers
- Capt. Thomas Herbert Geoffrey Bostock, London Yeomanry
- Temp Capt. Laurence Owen Bosworth MC
- Lt. Thomas Richard Arterr Bourne, Royal Army Service Corps
- Lt. Norman James Bowater, Royal Army Service Corps
- Capt. Lancelot Tregonwell Syndercombe Bower, Dorsetshire Regiment
- Capt. Alfred Benjaminr Bowhay, Royal Army Veterinary Corps
- Capt. George Edward Bowman, Machine Gun Corps
- Temp Capt. William Everett Bownass MC Royal Field Artillery
- Lt. Edward Valentine Bowra, Royal Engineers
- Temp Lt. Henry Bowron, Royal Army Service Corps
- Temp Capt. Herbert Augustus Boys, Royal Army Service Corps
- Temp Capt. William Allan Bradley MC Durham Light Infantry
- Capt. and Bt. Maj. Eustace Arthur Braya MC East Yorkshire Regiment
- Quartermaster and Capt. William Brennan, Royal Army Medical Corps
- Lt. Harry Brewin, Royal Field Artillery
- Temp Capt. Albert Victor Brice, Royal Engineers
- Maj. Eustace Carlile Brierley DSO Lancashire Fusiliers
- Capt. and Bt. Maj. Henry StackpooIe Briggs, Royal Engineers
- Temp Capt. Waldo Raven Briggs
- Lt.-Col. Eustace Webster Brightman, Royal Army Service Corps
- Temp Maj. Richard Bower Bristed, Royal Engineers
- Temp Capt. Joseph Fane Brieter, Manchester Regiment
- Lt. Hugh Richard Broimley-Davenport
- Temp Capt. Lennox Ross Broster Royal Army Medical Corps
- Temp Lt. Alwin Brown, Royal Army Ordnance Corps
- Capt. Geoffrey Mainwaring Brown
- Maj. Henry Brown, Royal Engineers
- Rev. William Joseph Brown, Royal Army Chaplains' Department
- Rev. Hugh Brown, Royal Army Chaplains' Department
- Capt. Cyril Edward Browne MC Royal Army Service Corps
- Capt. John Bruce, Royal Army Medical Corps
- Temp Lt. Guy Brunton, Labour Corps
- Temp Capt. Francis Bryce, King's Royal Rifle Corps
- Temp Capt. Maurice Bryans, Royal Army Service Corps
- Maj. Arthur Louis Hamilton Buchanan, Gordon Highlanders
- Temp Capt. Leslie Binmore Burlace, Royal Army Service Corps
- Lt. James Melvill Burchell, London Regiment
- Lt. Leonard Burland, Labour Corps
- Lt. Cuthbert Burn-Callender, Montgomeryshire Yeomanry
- Temp Capt. Edgar Bryan Burstali, Royal Army Service Corps
- Temp Lt.-Col. Henry Walter Burton, Royal Engineers
- Temp Capt. Frederick William Butler, Royal Army Service Corps
- Capt. James Ramsay Montagu Butler, Scottish Horse Yeomanry
- Maj. Gerald Bertram Byrne, Rifle Brigade
- Temp Lt. John Cameron, Royal Engineers
- Temp Capt. Duncan Campbell, Royal Army Veterinary Corps
- Capt. Francis Ernest Archer Campbell
- Temp Capt. Lewis Gordon Campbell
- Temp Lt. Thomas Campbell, Royal Engineers
- Lt. William Little Campbell, Royal Irish Regiment
- Temp Lt. Ernest Reginald Canharn, Royal Engineers
- Temp Capt. William Butler Cannon, Royal Army Service Corps
- Capt. James Edward Hamilton Carkett MC Duke of Cornwall's Light Infantry
- Maj. James Charles Gordon Carmichael, Royal Army Medical Corps
- Temp Lt. James Duncan Carmichael, Royal Engineers
- Capt. Noel Lewis Carringtton, Wiltshire Regiment
- Capt. William Carrington, King's Own Yorkshire Light Infantry
- Capt. Francis Carruthers, East Yorkshire Regiment
- Maj. Albert Joseph Henry Carstairs, Royal Irish Rifles
- Temp Capt. Ernest Walker Augustus Carter, Royal Engineers
- Temp Maj. Gerald Francis Carter
- Maj. Thomas Moravian Carter, Royal Army Medical Corps
- Temp Quartermaster and Capt. Arthur Case, South Wales Borderers
- Temp Lt. Anthony Aloysius Cassera, Royal Engineers
- Temp Capt. Henry James Cavanagh, Royal Army Service Corps
- Maj. Percy Cazenove, Hertfordshire Yeomanry
- Temp Capt. Alan Wentworth Chadwick, Hampshire Regiment
- Temp Lt. Sydney Arthur Chambers, Royal Engineers
- Temp Maj. Charles Leonard Chapman, Royal Marine Light Infantry
- Temp Lt. Leslie William Charley
- Lt. Richard Charnock MC Liverpool Regiment
- Rev. William Cramb Charteris MC Royal Army Chaplains' Department
- Maj. Ralph Diarley Cheales
- Capt. William George Lloyd Cheriton, Hampshire Regiment
- Lt.-Col. Henry Robert Stark Christie DSO Royal Engineers
- Temp Capt. Lionel Ronald Christie
- Temp Maj. Herbert James Clark, Royal Army Service Corps
- Temp Lt. Hugh Bryan Clark MC Royal Army Service Corps
- Capt. Charles Hugh Clarke, Lancashire Regiment
- Capt. and Bt. Maj. Gerald Clarke, Nottinghamshire and Derbyshire Regiment
- Quartermaster and Capt. Joseph Edward Clarke, Royal Sussex Regiment
- Maj. Richard C. Clarke, Royal Army Medical Corps
- Temp Capt. Frank Septimus Clay, Royal Army Veterinary Corps
- Maj. George Frederick Lancelot Clayton-East, Royal Garrison Artillery
- Temp Maj. Charles Edward Cleeve, Royal Army Service Corps
- Capt. Arthur Cliff, Worcestershire Regiment
- Temp Capt. Herbert Cunningham Clogstoun CIE labour Corps
- Lt.-Col. Francis Morton Close, Royal Engineers
- Temp Lt. Noel Stewart Clouston, Royal Engineers
- Ethel Robin Clowes MBE Unit Administrator, Queen Mary's Army Auxiliary Corps
- Temp Capt. Herbert Wallis Coales MC Royal Engineers
- Capt. Edward Clive Coates, 15th Hussars
- Temp Lt. Joseph Michael Smith Coates, Machine Gun Corps
- Maj. Geoffrey Ronald Codrington DSO Leicestershire Yeomanry
- Temp Lt. Daniel Coghlan, Lab. Corps
- Maj. John Maurice Colchester-Wemyss, Royal Scots
- Temp Maj. Harold Linter Cole, Royal Engineers
- Lt.-Col. Henry Walter George Cole CSI Indian Army
- Temp Capt. William Douglas Colin-York, Tank Corps
- Capt. William Harold Colley, Yorkshire Regiment
- Lt. Victor Alexander Colquhoom, Royal Field Artillery
- Maj. Charles Rowe Colvile, King's Royal Rifle Corps
- Temp Capt. Claude Gray Colyer, Royal Army Medical Corps
- Capt. Clifford Edward Constable MC King Edward's Horse
- Temp Capt. Victor Chandler Cook, Royal Army Service Corps
- Temp Maj. William Ernest Cook, Royal Marines
- Lt.-Col. and Hon Col. James Cook, T.F. Res.
- Temp Capt. Philip Andrew Cooks MC
- Temp Capt. Frederick Middleton Coombs, Royal Army Veterinary Corps
- Lt. Harold Octavius Cooper, Royal Field Artillery
- Maj. Daniel Maurice Corbett Royal Army Medical Corps
- Mary Cecilia Corbishley RRC Sister-in-Charge, Queen Alexandra's Imperial Military Nursing Service
- Maj. Frederick Alleyne Corfield DSO Royal Army Service Corps
- Maj. Reginald Philip Cork, Machine Gun Corps
- Temp Capt. Robert Kenrick Cornish-Bowden, Royal Engineers
- Lt. George Edward Corrall, Royal Fusiliers
- Temp Capt. Peter James Cottle MC Royal Engineers
- Temp Capt. Robert William Cousins, Royal Army Service Corps
- Capt. Thomas Coulson
- Lt.-Col. Percy Alexander Cox, Labour Corps
- Maj. Reginald Woodruff Cox, London Regiment
- Temp Capt. Frederick Coy, Labour Corps
- Temp and Hon Maj. Ernest Granville Crabtree, Royal Army Medical Corps
- Temp Capt. John Gibson Craig, Royal Army Medical Corps
- Capt. Norman Craig DSO Royal Army Service Corps
- Capt. Thomas Craig, Royal Army Veterinary Corps
- Maj. John Martim Maynard Crawford, Royal Army Medical Corps
- Temp Quartermaster and Capt. Frank Crewe, South Staffordshire Regiment
- Capt. Leonard Marshall Crockett
- Lt. Reginald Douglas Crosby MC Lincolnshire Regiment
- Lt. Arthur Tonley Crosthwaite, Royal Army Service Corps
- Temp Lt. Joseph John Crowe, Royal Engineers
- Temp Capt. Robert Scott Cruickshank, Royal Army Service Corps
- Rev. William Walker Cruickshank, Royal Army Chaplains' Department
- Temp Maj. Edward Harold Crump, Royal Engineers
- Lt. Philip Edwin Cuckow, Nottinghamshire and Derbyshire Regiment
- Capt. Barry Stephenson Cumberlege, Royal Army Service Corps
- Rev. Canon Bertram Keir Cunningham, Royal Army Chaplains' Department
- Maj. John Francis Cunningham, Royal Army Medical Corps
- Lt. Stanley Cursiter, Scottish Rifles
- Capt. Cecil Montagu Drury Curtis, South Wales Borderers
- Quartermaster and Capt. Frank Cutting, Royal Engineers
- Temp Capt. Reginald Thornton Dadson, Labour Corps
- Capt. John Dale, Royal Army Medical Corps
- Capt. William Brown Dalgleish
- Temp Maj. Lindsay Sydney Daniels, Royal Engineers
- Lt. Charles Malcolm Davenport, Royal Field Artillery
- Temp Capt. Hugh Stevenson Davidson FRCS Royal Army Medical Corps
- Temp Capt. James MacFarlane Davidson, Labour Corps
- Lt. Ernest James Davies, Labour Corps
- Temp Lt. Harry Cornwall Davies, Royal Engineers
- Capt. John Davies, Royal Army Ordnance Corps
- Temp Capt. Frank Gordon Davis, Royal Army Service Corps
- Temp Capt. Leslie Stalman Davis, Royal Army Service Corps
- Lt. John Kenneth Bomsfield Dawson, Army Cyclist Corps
- Temp Capt. Ralph Deakan
- Temp Lt.-Col. Maximilian John de Bathe, Labour Corps
- Temp Capt. Auguste John Charles de Bavay, Royal Army Service Corps
- Capt. and Bt. Maj. George Herbert Blackett Dechair MC Royal Sussex Regiment
- Maj. George De La Couf, Royal Army Medical Corps
- Temp Maj. Hervey Francis De Montmorency DSO Royal Field Artillery
- Capt. Arthur Dent MC Royal Army Service Corps
- Temp Maj. Frederic Rudolf Mackley De Paula
- Adole De Putron, Deputy Controller, Queen Mary's Army Auxiliary Corps
- Lt. Pierre Amédée de Savoie-Carignan de Soissons, Border Regiment
- Rev. Francis Charles Devas DSO Royal Army Chaplains' Department
- Rev. Philip Dominic Devas, Royal Army Chaplains' Department
- Quartermaster and Capt. George Joseph Dickinson
- Capt. Richard Frederick O'Toole Dickinson, Royal Army Medical Corps
- Capt. William Michael Kington Dickinson, York and Lancaster Regiment
- Capt. John Francis Douglas Dimock, Nottinghamshire and Derbyshire Regiment
- Capt. Melville Dinwiddie DSO MC Gordon Highlanders
- Temp Lt. Henry Philip Dix, MC
- Lt. Arthur Tollemache Dixon, Duke of Cornwall's Light Infantry
- Lt. George Seymour Dixon, East Kent Regiment
- Capt. Robert Garside Dixon, Royal Army Medical Corps
- Maj. William Chester Dixon DSO Leicestershire Regiment, attd. Royal Army Ordnance Corps
- Temp Capt. Roy Samuel Dobbins, Royal Army Medical Corps
- Lt.-Col. Conway Richard Dobbs, Royal Engineers
- Temp Lt. Archibald Forbes Dodds, Royal Army Ordnance Corps
- Temp Capt. Jackson Dodds, Royal Army Ordnance Corps
- Lt. Benjamin Dodsworth, T.F. Res
- Capt. William Hamish Donald
- Capt. Arthur William Hunter Donaldson, Royal Army Medical Corps
- Maj. James Henry Douglass, Royal Army Medical Corps
- Quartermaster and Capt. William Bernard Douthwaite, York and Lancaster Regiment
- Lt. Oscar Follett Dowson, Royal Army Service Corps
- Temp Hon Lt.-Col. Georges Dreyer, Royal Army Medical Corps
- Temp Capt. James Douglas Driberg MC Royal Army Medical Corps
- Temp Capt. Thomas Drury, Labour Corps
- Temp Capt. Cuthbert Dukes, Royal Army Medical Corps
- Maj. Frederick Alexander Du Breul, Gloucestershire Regiment
- Rev. James Duncan, Royal Army Chaplains' Department
- Quartermaster and Lt. David Blaikie Duncan, Scottish Rifles
- Maj. James Matthews Duncan, Royal Army Medical Corps
- Capt. William Duncan, Royal Army Medical Corps
- Maj. Allan Charlesworth Dundas, Middlesex Regiment
- Maj. Arthur Dymock, Royal Army Ordnance Corps
- Lt.-Col. Harry Bernard Dyson DSO Royal Scots
- Capt. Augustus Thornhill Earle, Liverpool Regiment
- Temp Capt. Ralph Parsons Earwaker, Royal Army Service Corps
- Capt. Henry Rayner Eaton, Manchester Regiment, attd. Tank Corps
- Temp Maj. Herbert Edgington, Royal Army Service Corps
- Temp Capt. Walter Edgington, Royal Army Service Corps
- Quartermaster and Capt. Edmund Edser, Royal Army Medical Corps
- Temp Capt. John Augustus Edwards, Royal Army Veterinary Corps
- Rev. Nathaniel Walter Allan Edwards MC Royal Army Chaplains' Department
- Lt. Walter Bernard Edwards MC Worcestershire Regiment
- Temp Capt. Douglas Rous Edwards-Ker, Royal Engineers
- Lt. Leonard Alsager Elgood MC Royal Highlanders
- Maj. Clarence John Elkan DSO Royal Irish Fusiliers
- Temp Maj. Arthur Addison Ellwood DSO MC Machine Gun Corps
- Temp Capt. Robert Alan Erskine-Murray, Royal Engineers
- Temp Lt. Harry Erwin, Royal Army Ordnance Corps
- Lt. Arthur James Espley, East Lancashire Regiment
- Maj. John Evans, Royal Inniskilling Fusiliers
- Quartermaster Maj. William Richard Evans, Royal Engineers
- Temp Maj. William Stanley Divans, Royal Army Service Corps
- Maj. John Everidge, Royal Army Medical Corps
- Temp Maj. Gerald Valentine Ewart, Royal Army Service Corps
- Maj. Nigel Harry Skinner Fargus DSO Royal Scots
- Maj. Thomas William Fasson, Royal Army Ordnance Corps
- Temp Lt.-Col. James Scott Fawcus, Labour Corps
- Gladys Maud Feiling, Unit Administrator, Queen Mary's Army Auxiliary Corps
- Temp Lt. Ernest Edward Fenn, Royal Engineers
- Temp Maj. Ralph Lennox Fenner
- Temp Maj. Samuel Greame Fenton, Royal Army Service Corps
- Maj. James Ferguson, Royal Field Artillery
- Capt. Montgomery du Bois Ferguson, Royal Army Medical Corps
- Capt. Robert Fernie, Royal Field Artillery
- Lt. Charles Gordon Ferrier, Yorkshire Hussars
- Rev. William Field, Royal Army Chaplains' Department
- Quartermaster and Capt. Charles Arthur Figg, Royal Army Medical Corps
- Maj. William Robert Edward Heneage Finch, Manchester Regiment
- Maj. Otto Sarony Fisher, Royal Army Veterinary Corps
- Capt. Walter Bryan Flook, Royal Army Service Corps
- Capt. Stephen Flowers MC Royal Engineers
- Temp Maj. Geared Robert Edward Foley, Royal Irish Rifles
- Mary Gladys Corinne Foley RRC MM Sister-in-Charge, Queen Alexandra's Imperial Military Nursing Service
- Temp Maj. Peter Trant Foley MBE Royal Munster Fusiliers
- Temp Lt. Robert William Foot MC Royal Field Artillery
- Maj. Ronald Foster Forbes DSO Highland Light Infantry
- Capt. Charles Forbes Royal Army Medical Corps
- Temp Maj. Stanley William Ford, Labour Corps
- Capt. Arthur Norman Foster, Royal Army Veterinary Corps
- Temp Capt. Edward Foster, Royal Army Service Corps
- Maj. Frank Broome Foster, Royal Army Service Corps
- Temp and Hon Maj. Kennedy Foster, Royal Army Medical Corps
- Maj. Michael George Foster, Royal Army Medical Corps
- Lt. William Fox, Scottish Rifles
- Capt. Henry Frank Frampton, Labour Corps
- Maj. Edward Franklin, Royal Army Veterinary Corps
- Maj. James William Fraser CMG Seaforth Highlanders
- Capt. Thomas Lockhead Fraser, Royal Army Medical Corps
- Capt. Sir Charles Edward St. John Frederick Bt Northants. Yeomanry
- Capt. John Sidney Fulton MC Lancashire Fusiliers
- Maj. Montague Furber, Royal Irish Rifles
- Lt. Dennis Walter Furlong MC Royal Berkshire Regiment
- Temp Capt. Howell Woodwell Gabe, Royal Army Medical Corps
- Temp Capt. Victor John Gadban, Labour Corps
- Maj. Henry Gamble, Royal Army Veterinary Corps
- Maj. Frank Harold Garraway MC London Regiment
- Capt. Arthur Gaunt, West Yorkshire Regiment
- Temp Maj. Arthur Stretton Gaye, Royal Army Service Corps
- Lt. William John Geddes, Royal Field Artillery
- Temp Lt. Wilfred Harold George, Royal Engineers
- Temp Capt. William Morrison Gibb, Tank Corps
- Capt. Gerald Francis Petvin Gibbons, Royal Army Medical Corps
- Temp Lt. Oliver Thomas Brice Gibbons, Machine Gun Corps
- Temp Maj. Robert Harold Giblett, Royal Army Service Corps
- Maj. Arthur Clare Vernon Gibson, Royal Army Ordnance Corps
- Capt. Archibald John Gilchrist MC Royal Army Medical Corps
- Capt. Hylton Lloyd Giles, Norfolk Regiment
- Lt. Bernard George Gillett, Indian Army Reserve of Officers
- Lt.-Col. Geoffrey Goyer Gilligan DSO Argyll and Sutherland Highlanders
- Lt. William Bertie Gimbeort, Royal Field Artillery
- Capt. Francis William Crewe Godley, Royal Army Service Corps
- Temp Capt. Hugh Stuart Trevor Goff, Royal Army Service Corps
- Maj. Robert Elphinstone Dalrymple Goldingham, Royal Engineers
- Maj. Henry Wetherall Goldney MC Royal Artillery
- Temp Capt. Bertram Francis Alex Gordon-Forbes, Royal Army Ordnance Corps
- Capt. Francis Wilfred Gore-Langton, Coldstream Guards
- Capt. Henry James Gorrie, Royal Army Medical Corps
- Temp Capt. Charles Bernard Goulden, Royal Army Medical Corps
- Maj. David James Graham FRCP Royal Army Medical Corps
- Temp Maj. John St. John Graham
- Temp Capt. James Wells Graham
- Temp Lt.-Col. Montagu James Grant-Peterkin, Cameron Highlanders
- Maj. Arthur Claypon Horner Gray, Royal Army Medical Corps
- Temp Lt. Joseph Alexander Gray, Royal Engineers
- Maj. Reginald Wentworth Gray, Leinster Regiment
- Capt. Douglas Harold Green MC Royal Engineers
- Temp Maj. William Robert Green, Royal Army Ordnance Corps
- Maj. Frederick William Greenhill, Labour Corps
- Maj. Albert David Greig MC Royal Garrison Artillery
- Temp Capt. Kenneth Clunie Greig, Royal Army Ordnance Corps
- Temp Capt. Charles Beresford Fulke Greville, Lord Greville
- Quartermaster and Capt. Ernest Moore Griorson, Royal Army Medical Corps
- Capt. Owen Charles Guinness, Worcestershire Regiment
- Temp Lt. John Cedric Gurney
- Capt. Edward Martin Guy, Northumberland Hussars
- Rev. Edward James Hagan, Royal Army Chaplains' Department
- Temp Capt. John Alicius Haig, Royal Army Service Corps
- Maj. Henry Engelbert Hake, Royal Warwickshire Regiment
- Maj. Bertram Arthur Montagu Hall, Royal Garrison Artillery
- Rev. James Thomas Hall, Royal Army Chaplains' Department
- Temp Capt. Vincent Claud Hall, Royal Engineers
- Temp Maj. William Henry Hall
- Lt.-Col. Alexander George Hamilton, Royal Army Medical Corps
- Maj. Norman Chiyas Hamilton DSC Royal Army Service Corps
- Temp Capt. Ralph Ashton Hamlyn, Royal Army Service Corps
- Temp Maj. Geoffrey Hyde Barclay Hanbury, Royal Army Service Corps
- Rev. Guy Somerset Hanbury, Royal Army Chaplains' Department
- Capt. William Venning Glanville Hancock, Royal Garrison Artillery
- Lt. William Gemmill Chalmers Hanna, Seaforth Highlanders
- Temp Capt. Nicholas James Hannen, Royal Army Service Corps
- Temp Lt. Arthur George Harding, Royal Army Ordnance Corps
- Capt. Philip Edward Harding MC London Regiment
- Capt. Richard Spalding Harding, 5th Battalion, North Staffordshire Regiment
- Lt. Noel de Courcy Hardwick, Indian Army Reserve of Officers
- Temp Maj. Frank Buckland Hardy, Royal Army Service Corps
- Rev. Ernest James Harewood, Royal Army Chaplains' Department
- Lt. Laurence Appleyard Hargreaves, Royal Army Service Corps
- Rev. Thomas Alphonsus Harker, Royal Army Chaplains' Department
- Temp Maj. Reginald Tristram Harper, Royal Army Veterinary Corps
- Temp Maj. Harold D. Harpham, Labour Corps
- Temp Maj. William Lewis Harpur, Royal Engineers
- Temp Capt. Guy Summerell Harris, Royal Army Service Corps
- Temp Lt. Leopold Jonas Harris, Royal Engineers
- Temp Maj. Frank Harrison MC
- Temp Maj. Francis Edward Harrison, Royal Engineers
- Temp Capt. James Norman Jackson Hartley, Royal Army Medical Corps
- Quartermaster and Capt. Arthur Hastings Hartshorn, Royal Engineers
- Temp Lt. Stuart Henderson Hastie MC Highland Light Infantry
- Lt.-Col. John Henry Hastings DSO West Yorkshire Regiment
- Temp Capt. George Hawkins, Royal Army Service Corps
- Capt. Harold John Charlton Hawkins, Royal Army Service Corps
- Capt. Cuthbert Morley Headlam DSO Bedfordshire Yeomanry
- Capt. Edward Hearne, Royal Army Veterinary Corps
- Capt. Gilbert Stanley Heathcote MVO Nottinghamshire and Derbyshire Regiment
- Capt. the Hon Arnold Henderson, Royal Wiltshire Yeomanry
- Temp Maj. George Richard Hennessy
- Lt. Edward Dave Asher Herbert, Royal Garrison Artillery
- Lt.-Col. Henry Carden Herbert, South Lancashire Regiment
- Temp Capt. Arthur Cochran Herdman
- Temp Capt. William Herrick, Royal Army Service Corps
- Temp Capt. Robert Charles Herron, Royal Army Service Corps
- Maj. Alfred Herbert Heslop DSO Royal Army Medical Corps
- Rev. Sydney Rangeley Hewitt, Royal Army Chaplains' Department (dated 15 February 1919.)
- Lt. Dorglas Heyde, Royal Engineers
- Capt. and Bt. Maj. Francis Albert Heymann, Royal Engineers
- Lt.-Col. Cecil Francis Heyworth-Savage, Royal Fusiliers
- Maj. Thomas Hibbard TD Royal Army Veterinary Corps
- Temp Lt. George Hibbert
- Capt. and Bt. Maj. Lancelot Daryl Hickes MC Royal Garrison Artillery
- Capt. Thomas Twistington Higgins FRCS Royal Army Medical Corps
- Temp Maj. Herbert John Hill DSO Royal Engineers
- Temp Maj. Lionel Edward Hill MC Royal Engineers
- Maj. and Bt. Lt.-Col. Charles Edward Hills, Royal Army Service Corps
- Temp Maj. Reginald Playfair Hills MC
- Capt. Harold Montague Hinde, Royal Army Service Corps
- Lt. Harold Hammondv Hindmarsh
- Lt.-Col. Claud Vere Cavendish Hobart DSO T.F. Res
- Rev. Philip Giffard Holden, Royal Army Chaplains' Department
- Temp Capt. William Jeffkins Holdich, Labour Corps
- Capt. John Evelyn Holdsworth, 2nd Dragoon Guards
- Temp Lt. Ronald Morris Holland, Royal Army Ordnance Corps
- Temp Capt. Theodore Samuel Holland
- Temp Lt. Vyvyan Beresford Holland, Royal Field Artillery
- Quartermaster and Capt. George Holley, Lancashire Fusiliers
- Lt. Henry Arthur Holland DSO Royal Garrison Artillery
- Temp Maj. Arthur Joseph Holloway, Royal Engineers
- Temp Lt. Dan Campbell Holmes, Tank Corps
- Lt. Alfred Ernest Holmes-Brown, Royal Garrison Artillery
- Capt. Thomas Nathaniel Hone, King's Royal Rifle Corps
- Temp Maj. Charles William Menelaub Hope, Royal Army Medical Corps
- Maj. Charles-Spread Hope-Johnstone, Royal Field Artillery
- Temp Lt. Thomas Hollis Hopkins MBE Royal Engineers
- Lt. James Davidson Hossack, Seaforth Highlanders
- Temp Capt. Hugh Roberts Howard, Royal Army Service Corps
- Capt. Norman Howell, Royal Field Artillery
- Temp Capt. Reginald Kirshaw Hubbard, Royal Army Service Corps
- Maj. John Huck, Border Regiment
- Temp Capt. and Bt. Maj. Ernest John Hudson
- Maj. Robert Challis Hudson, Royal Army Service Corps
- Capt. and Bt. Maj. Frederick St. John Hughes MVO Staff
- Temp Capt. John Trevor Hughes-Jones, Royal Army Ordnance Corps
- Capt. FitzHerbert Hugo MC
- Temp Maj. Henry Herbert Humphreys MC Royal Army Service Corps
- Rev. Joseph Wellington Hunkin MC Royal Army Chaplains' Department
- Maj. Cecil Stuart Hunter DSO Royal Garrison Artillery
- Capt. Herbert Francis Searancks Huntington, Welsh Regiment
- Temp Lt.-Col. Arthur Reginald Hurst DSO Royal Field Artillery
- Temp Lt. Arthur Vivian Hussey, Royal Engineers
- Maj. Thomas-Massie Hutchinson DSO Royal Army Service Corps
- Temp Capt. Eric Henry Philip-Blundell Ince
- Capt. Alexander Reid Inglis
- Temp Lt. Bruce Stirling Ingram MC Royal Garrison Artillery
- Temp Lt. Arthur Cecil Inskip, Labour Corps
- Temp Capt. Swinscho James Jackson, Royal Irish Regiment
- Rev. John Thomas Jacob, Royal Army Chaplains' Department
- Lt. Jonathan Jacobs, Royal Field Artillery
- Temp Capt. David Napier Jameson, Royal Army Service Corps
- Maj. Charles Francis Cracroft Jarvis, Lincolnshire Regiment
- Temp Capt. Herbert Jefferson, Royal Army Service Corps
- Temp Maj. Lawrence Wynyard Jenner, Royal Army Service Corps
- Lt. Leonard Jennings, Northed Hussars
- Temp Maj. Bernard Jessop, Royal Engineers
- Maj. Frederick William Johnson, Royal Army Medical Corps
- Capt. Harry Bertram Johnson MC Royal Army Ordnance Corps
- Capt. John Johnston, Royal Scots
- Temp Quartermaster and Capt. Robert George Johnston, Royal Army Medical Corps
- Lt. Charles Jones, Royal Army Service Corps
- Gladys Alicia Jones MBE Deputy Controller, Queen Mary's Army Auxiliary Corps
- Temp Lt. John Jones, Royal Army Ordnance Corps
- Capt. John Lloyd Charles Jones, Royal Army Veterinary Corps
- Capt. John Howard Jones, Royal Army Veterinary Corps
- Temp Lt. Harold George Jordan, Royal Engineers
- Temp Capt. Frederick Percy Joscelyne MC Royal Army Medical Corps
- Temp Capt. Thomas Bettsworth Keep, Royal Army Service Corps
- Maj. George Theodore Elphinstone Keith DSO Royal Lancaster Regiment
- Maj. Rudolph Henry Keller DSO Nottinghamshire and Derbyshire Regiment
- Temp Maj. Philip Travice Rubie Kellner DSO Royal Engineers
- Temp Capt. Arthur Lindsay Kelly, King's Royal Rifle Corps
- Rev. George Kendall, Royal Army Chaplains' Department
- Temp Capt. Edgar Stephen Kemp
- Lt.-Col. Archibald Arrol Kennedy DSO TD Scottish Rifles
- Maj. Guy Belfield Kensington, Royal Engineers
- Capt. John Joseph Guiney Keppel, Royal Army Veterinary Corps
- Capt. Colin King, Royal Army Medical Corps
- Capt. Frank King DSO 4th Hussars
- Maj. Lancelot Noel Friedrick Irving King, Royal Engineers
- Capt. Leonard Algernon Bertram King
- Lt. William Kirby, Anson Battalion, Royal Naval Division
- Lt. Alan Kennedy Kitson, Royal Army Service Corps
- Capt. Walter Frederick Clifford Kitson, Royal Army Service Corps
- Maj. Cecil Davenport Knight, 6th Dragoon Guards
- Capt. Ernest Knight, Royal Army Medical Corps
- Temp Capt. William Collins Knight, Lincolnshire Regiment
- Maj. George Patrick Knott, Royal Army Veterinary Corps
- Lt. Arthur Ernest George Knowling, Royal Army Service Corps
- Temp Maj. Louis Francis Knuthsen, Royal Army Medical Corps
- Rev. Carey Frederick Knyvett, Royal Army Chaplains' Department
- Lt. Charles Mendel Kohan, Royal Artillery
- Temp Maj. Carl Hans Kuhne DSO Royal Army Service Corps
- Temp Capt. James Lang, Royal Engineers
- Temp Capt. Alfred Lawrence, Royal Army Ordnance Corps
- Temp Quartermaster and Capt. Ernest Evelyn Lister Lawson, Nottinghamshire and Derbyshire Regiment
- Temp Capt. John Hurleston Leche, 12th Lancers
- Quartermaster and Capt. Herbert Benjamin Lee, Royal Army Medical Corps
- Hon Maj. Lennie Henry Lee, Indian Army Reserve of Officers
- Temp Maj. George Lees, Royal Army Ordnance Corps
- Lt. Cecil Henry Legg, Royal Army Service Corps
- Maj. Frank Bertram Legh MC Royal Engineers
- Maj. Robert Walter Dickson Leslie, Royal Army Medical Corps
- Capt. and Bt. Maj. Joseph Henry Levey DSO Gordon Highlanders
- Temp Lt. Jamea Charles Lewis, Royal Army Service Corps
- Temp Capt. Thomas Percy Lewis, Royal Army Medical Corps
- Temp Capt. Dudley Mark Percy Liddle, Royal Army Service Corps
- Temp Capt. Walker Stewart Lindsay, Royal Army Medical Corps
- Rev. Charles Edward Chaloner Lindsey, Royal Army Chaplains' Department
- Maj. D'Arcy Hunter Little, London Regiment
- Temp Maj. Everard Frederick Ernest Livesey
- Quartermaster and Capt. John Stewart Livingstone, Middlesex Regiment
- Lt. Robert Heaton Livingstone, South Staffordshire Regiment
- Lt. Charles Herbert Llewellin DCM Royal Engineers
- Lt.-Col. Arthur Llewellyn
- Capt. John Daniel Stuart Lloyd MC Welsh Horse
- Maj. Llewellyn Hubert Lloyd, Royal Army Service Corps
- Temp Capt. Arthur Lock, Royal Army Service Corps
- Temp Lt. Norman Charles Lockhart, Royal Field Artillery
- Quartermaster and Maj. John Lockie
- Lt. Acting Maj. Frederick Robert Logan MC Lancashire Fusiliers
- Temp Capt. Walter Long, Royal Army Service Corps
- Capt. Henry Hardman Lord, Royal Army Veterinary Corps
- Capt. James Vass Lorimer, Royal Army Service Corps
- Temp Capt. Cecil Hubert Loveridge
- Alice Mary Lowe MBE Department Controller, Queen Mary's Army Auxiliary Corps
- Capt. James Lawson Low, Gordon Highlanders
- Temp Maj. Mervyn Hanbury Lowther-Clarke
- Temp Capt. Alfred Ludlow-Hewitt, Royal Army Service Corps
- Temp Capt. Norman Peace Lacy Lumb, Royal Army Medical Corps
- Temp Capt. Thomas Gerhard Leslie Luson, Royal Army Service Corps
- Temp Lt.-Col. John Clifford Vacy Lyle DSO MC labour Corps
- Lt. Kenneth Lyon, Royal Artillery
- Quartermaster and Capt. William James McArthur
- Elizabeth Lusk Macauley, Acting Sister, Queen Alexandra's Imperial Military Nursing Service
- Temp 2nd Lt. Henry Hector MacColl
- Temp Capt. Charles Ogle Maconachie MC Royal Army Veterinary Corps
- Capt. Frederic de Cree McCracken, Royal Army Service Corps
- Temp Maj. Cuthbert Laud MacDona
- Temp Capt. Charles James Lewis McDonald MBE
- Temp Capt. Francis Caven MacDonald Royal Army Medical Corps
- Temp Maj. James Ratcliff McDonald, Labour Corps
- Maj.Duncan MacDonald, Royal Army Veterinary Corps
- Temp Capt. Frederick George MacDougall, Royal Engineers
- Maj. William Allen McDougall DSO Royal Army Veterinary Corps
- Temp Capt. Alexander McDowell, Royal Engineers
- Temp Capt. William MacEwen, Royal Army Medical Corps
- Capt. Ronald Bute MacFie, Royal Army Medical Corps
- Capt. Alexander Muir McGrigor, Gloucestershire Yeomanry
- Rev. Daniel John McHugh, Royal Army Chaplains' Department
- Capt. Robert Whyte MacKay, Gordon Highlanders
- Temp Capt. Colin Mackenzie, Royal Army Medical Corps
- Capt. Alexander MacKenzie, Royal Army Veterinary Corps
- Temp Maj. James McLachlan, Royal Engineers
- Temp Maj. Adam Gordon MacLeod DSO Royal Army Service Corps
- Maj. Gerald MacMahon, Patrick Ruadh, Royal Artillery
- Rev. John Victor MacMillan, Royal Army Chaplains' Department
- Capt. Ernest Ronald MacPherson, Gordon Highlanders
- Captl Malcolm Munro MacPherson, Seaforth Highlanders
- Maj. John Charles MacSwiney, Connaught Rangers
- Temp Capt. Thomas MacVey
- Temp Capt. William Reginald Major, Royal Engineers
- Capt. Frank Haistone Malyon, 21st Punjabis, Indian Army
- Capt. Percival Ramsey Mann, London Regiment
- Capt. David Murdock Marr, Royal Army Medical Corps
- Capt. Herbert Marriott
- Capt. Samuel Warburton Marriott, Royal Army Veterinary Corps
- Lt.-Col. Roger Dodington Marriott, West Somerset Yeomanry
- Maj. John Henry Frederick Marsden TD Nottinghamshire and Derbyshire Regiment
- Temp Capt. Octavius de Burgh Marsh, Royal Army Medical Corps
- Capt. Geoffrey Marshall, Royal Army Medical Corps
- Lt. Hugh John Cole Marshall, Royal Engineers
- Maj. Isa Carswell Marshall, Royal Army Medical Corps
- Maj. Charles James Martin Royal Army Medical Corps
- Maj. and Bt. Lt.-Col. Gerald Hamilton Martin CMG DSO King's Royal Rifle Corps
- Maj. Anthony Wood Martyn DSO Royal West Kent Regiment
- Maj. Samuel Martyn Royal Army Medical Corps
- Maj. Maurice Edward Mascall DSO Royal Garrison Artillery
- Temp Capt. and Bt. Maj. Edward Mason, Royal Army Service Corps
- Capt. Robert Wyllie Mason, Royal Army Service Corps
- Temp Capt. Robert Massie, Royal Army Medical Corps
- Lt. William Masterson, Royal West Surrey Regiment
- Capt. and Bt. Maj. William Eyre Matcham DSO Rem. Service
- Maj. Harry Gerald Keith Matchett, Connaught Rangers
- Maj. David Mathers DSO DCM Royal Inniskilling Fusiliers
- Temp Capt. Edmond George Matheson, Royal Engineers
- Lt. Felton Arthur Hamilton Mathew MC Royal Engineers
- Lt. Herbert Matthews MC
- Temp Capt. Richard Mawson Mattocks
- Temp Maj. Charles Raymond Maude MC
- Capt. and Bt. Maj. Christian George Maude DSO MC Royal Fusiliers
- Capt. Ronald Edmund Maude, Royal Army Service Corps
- Lt. Ernest Ricardo Maund
- Temp Capt. Octavius Studdert Maunsell, Royal Army Medical Corps
- Temp Capt. William Willmott Mawson, Leicestershire Regiment
- Temp Maj. Noel Bankart May, Royal Army Ordnance Corps
- Temp Capt. Arthur Hubert Maycock, Royal Army Service Corps
- Maj. Denis John Meagher, Indian Army
- Capt. Henry Louis Meagher, Royal Field Artillery
- Temp Capt. Richard John Rupert Measham, Royal Engineers
- Temp Capt. John Clarence Medcalfe, Royal Army Ordnance Corps
- Maj. John Seymour Mellor MC King's Royal Rifle Corps
- Maj. Henry Chase Meredith, Shropshire Yeomanry
- Lt.-Col. Francis Killigrew Seymour Metford VD labour Corps
- Temp Capt. Harry Vincent Mercer Metivier, Royal Army Veterinary Corps
- Lt. Everard Charles Meynell MC Royal Field Artillery
- Temp Capt. Robert Alexander Lindley Meynell
- Lt.-Col. Spencer Mildred DSO Royal Engineers
- Temp Capt. James Cousins Miller, Royal Army Veterinary Corps
- Temp Capt. Edward Thomas Campbell Milligan, Royal Army Medical Corps
- Lt.-Col. Harry Dacres Millward, Worcestershire Regiment
- Temp Maj. John Malcolm Mitchell MC
- Temp Lt. Leonard Ernest Mold, Royal Engineers
- Capt. Roger Murray Moncrieff, Royal Highlanders
- Maj. Hon. George Vere Arundell Monckton-Arundell DSO 1st Life Guards
- Capt. Kenneth Robertson Money
- Capt. Gordon Wickham Monier Williams MC London Regiment
- Capt. Frederick James Osbaldeston Montagu MC Coldstream Guards
- Capt. St. John Edward Montagu, Northumberland Fusiliers
- Lt. Vivian Charles Montagu, Honourable Artillery Company
- Temp Lt. Charles Edward Montague
- Capt. Hugh Glencairn Monteith DSO Royal Army Medical Corps
- Capt. John Musparatt Mood MC Royal Dublin Fusiliers
- Lt. Jasper Moon, Liverpool Regiment
- Quartermaster and Capt. James Moore MC Royal Army Service Corps
- Capt. James York Moore, Royal Army Medical Corps
- Temp Capt. Robert Foster Moore, Royal Army Medical Corps
- Capt. John William Moran, Royal Army Service Corps
- Temp Lt. Stanley Herbert Morgan, Royal Engineers
- Capt. Thomas Morgan, Henry, T.F. Res
- Temp Capt. Ernest Morison, East Yorkshire Regiment
- Temp Capt. Arthur Claude Morrell MC
- Maj. Frederick Morris MC Royal Army Ordnance Corps
- Temp Capt. John Tertius Morrison, Royal Army Medical Corps
- Capt. Edwin Ralph Maddison Morton, Royal Army Service Corps
- 2nd Lt. Arthur Morwood, Royal Engineers
- Lt. Kenneth Neville Moss, Royal Engineers
- Temp Capt. Francis Henry Meson, Royal Army Medical Corps
- Capt. Albert Edward Phayre Mudge, Royal Inniskilling Fusiliers
- Temp Capt. George Muir, Royal Engineers
- Temp Maj. Robert Godfrey Mundy, Royal Army Service Corps
- Temp Capt. Leonard Munn, Royal Engineers
- Temp Maj. Robert Murdoch, Royal Army Service Corps
- Temp Capt. James Murphy, Labour Corps
- Temp Maj. Walter Murray MC Royal Engineers
- Lt. Walter Andrew Myles, South Lancashire Regiment
- Temp Capt. Charles James Napier MBE
- Quartermaster and Capt. Alfred Neate, Somerset Light Infantry
- Temp Lt. Frederick Harry Neate, Royal Engineers
- Capt. Alfred Owen Needham MC Lancashire Fusiliers
- Temp Maj. James Easthope Needham, Labour Corps
- Temp Capt. George London Neil, Royal Army Medical Corps
- Maj. Leopold Monk Newell, Royal Army Service Corps
- Temp Quartermaster and Capt. Frederick Herbert Newman, Royal West Surrey Regiment
- Maj. Richard Ernest Upton Newman MC Royal Army Medical Corps
- Temp Capt. Vincent Chester Newman, Royal Marines
- Temp Capt. Charles Todd Newsome, Royal Army Service Corps
- Hon Lt.-Col. Edward Hall Nicholas, Royal Army Medical Corps
- Capt. James Edward Nieholls
- Temp Maj. Henry Scoble Nicholson, Labour Corps
- Rev. George Erskine Nicol, Royal Army Chaplains' Department
- Capt. Randall James Nicol, Argyll and Sutherland Highlanders
- Capt. Frederick Alan Benson Nicoll, Royal Sussex Regiment
- Capt. Bertram Wilfred Noble, Honourable Artillery Company
- Lt. Hon. Charles Hubert Francis Noel, Coldstream Guards
- Maj. Edward Hubert Norman DSO Royal West Kent Regiment
- Capt. Harold James Northcott, Royal Army Service Corps
- Temp Maj. Charles John Norwood, Royal Army Service Corps
- Temp Capt. William Oates, Royal Engineers
- Quartermaster and Lt.-Col. John O'Donnell
- Capt. Robert Louis O'Grady
- Temp Quartermaster and Capt. Ernest O'Hara, Royal Army Medical Corps
- Capt. John William O'Kelly, Royal Army Veterinary Corps
- Rev. Gordon Miles Staveley Oldham, Royal Army Chaplains' Department
- Temp Capt. Edward Victor Oliver, Royal Army Ordnance Corps
- Temp Maj. Matthew William Bailie Oliver, Royal Army Medical Corps
- Temp Lt. Arthur Edward Olley, Royal Garrison Artillery
- Lt. Rupert Charles Ollivant, Royal Field Artillery
- Lt. Henry Michael O'Riordan, Labour Corps
- Capt. Thomas Maclay Ormiston, Royal Army Medical Corps
- Quartermaster and Maj. John Williams Osborne, Royal Army Medical Corps
- Temp Capt. James Bell Osier, Royal Army Service Corps
- Temp 2nd Lt. Bertram Maurice Owen MC Royal Engineers
- Maj. Randle Harry Palin, Indian Army
- Temp Capt. Alexander Croyden Palmer, Royal Army Medical Corps
- Temp Maj. Herbert James Leslie Palmer, Royal Army Ordnance Corps
- Temp Capt. Albert Pam
- Temp Lt. Edgar Pam, Royal Engineers
- Temp Maj. Beltran William Parker, Royal Army Service Corps
- Frances Mary Parker MBE Deputy Controller, Queen Mary's Army Auxiliary Corps
- Rev. Joseph Parker, Royal Army Chaplains' Department
- Lt. Sidney James Parker, Royal Fusiliers
- Lt. Maj. Herbert-Denis Parkin MC Royal Army Service Corps
- Capt. Matthew Wallace Paterson MC Royal Army Medical Corps
- Capt. Hanfoury Pawle, Royal Berkshire Regiment
- Temp Lt.-Col. William Ellis Peachey, Labour Corps
- Temp Maj. Edward Gordon Peake, Royal Engineers
- Temp Capt. Edward Oscar Pearce, Royal Engineers
- Capt. Basil Lancelot Pearson, Royal Army Service Corps
- 2nd Lt. Donald Munroe Peattie, Labour Corps
- Temp Quartermaster and Capt. Sidney James Pearsall, Nottinghamshire and Derbyshire Regiment
- Capt. John Cyril Étienne Pellereau, Royal Field Artillery
- Maj. Edward Samuel Penrose, Essex Regiment
- Temp Capt. William Hughes Perkins, Royal Engineers
- Capt. Henry Marrian Joseph Perry, Royal Army Medical Corps
- Maj. Guy Lansbury Peterson, Royal Army Service Corps
- Capt. William de Malet Peyton Royal Army Medical Corps
- Temp Lt. Albert John Philpot, Royal Engineers
- Capt. William Robertus Pierce, Royal Army Medical Corps
- Temp Quartermaster and Capt. Frederick William Pillow
- Temp Capt. Albert Edward Pinniger, Royal Army Medical Corps
- Capt. Matthew George Platts MC Royal Engineers
- 2nd Lt. Frederick Plucknett, Labour Corps
- Capt. James Joseph Plunkett, Royal Army Veterinary Corps
- Maj. Francis Garden Poole DSO Middlesex Regiment
- Temp Capt. Mark Pooles, Royal Army Service Corps
- Capt. Andrew Noble Pope, Royal Fusiliers
- Temp Capt. John Peyser, Royal Army Service Corps
- Maj. Prescott Anson Prescott-Roberts, Royal Army Service Corps
- Temp Capt. Charles Weaver Price MC Tank Corps
- Edith Mary Pidden MBE Department Controller, Queen Mary's Army Auxiliary Corps
- Temp Capt. Edward Procter, Royal Engineers
- Maj. Albert Westlake Pryce-Jones, Royal Welsh Fusiliers
- Maj. George Douglas Pullar, Royal Highlanders
- Temp Capt. John Lindsay Pullar, Royal Highlanders
- Maj. Charles Evelyn Pym, Suffolk Yeomanry
- Lt. George Rainsford, Labour Corps
- Temp Capt. William Ramage, Royal Army Service Corps
- Temp Capt. Ronald Arthur Ramsay, King's Own Yorkshire Light Infantry
- Maj. Ernest Charles Raper
- Temp Maj. Harold Raymond MC
- Capt. Hugh Phillips Raymond, Royal Army Service Corps
- Temp Lt. Charles Edward Hay Reckitt, Royal Engineers
- Temp Maj. Arthur Edward Redfern MC
- Maj. Blethyn Treherne Rees, Monmouthshire Regiment
- Temp Capt. William Arthur Rees, Royal Army Medical Corps
- Capt. Temp Maj. Graham Beauchamp-Coxeter Rees-Mogg, Royal Army Veterinary Corps, attd. 1st Life Guards
- Quartermaster and Capt. William Clifford Renton, Royal Army Medical Corps
- Maj. Theodore Rich, Royal Engineers
- Lt. Malcolm John Richards, Royal Garrison Artillery
- Capt. Harry Richardson MC Royal Engineers
- Maj. John Duncan Richmond DSO Royal Army Medical Corps
- Maj. Hon Jasper Nicholas Ridley, Northamptonshire Hussars
- Maj. William Percy Rigden TD Special Reserve
- Maj. Michael Balfour Hutchinson Ritchie DSO Royal Army Medical Corps
- Capt. Robert Linton Ritchie, Royal Army Medical Corps
- Temp Capt. James Ernest Holme Roberts, Royal Army Medical Corps
- Capt. Alfred Leopold Robertson, Royal Army Medical Corps
- Temp Maj. Donald Struon Robertson, Royal Army Service Corps
- Capt. Frederick William Robertson, Royal Scots
- Temp Capt. Robert Charles Robertson, Royal Army Medical Corps
- Capt. Augustus Francis Robinson, London Regiment
- Temp Capt. John Robson
- Temp Capt. Herbert Charles Rockett, Royal Army Veterinary Corps
- Maj. Henry Buckley Roderick, Royal Army Medical Corps
- Capt. Henry Waters Lyttelton Rogers, Royal Irish Rifles
- Capt. Harry Duggan Rollinson, Royal Army Medical Corps
- Temp Capt. Charles Robert Ritchie Romer
- Lt. Robert Wolfgang Bomer, Royal Field Artillery
- Capt. Walter Joseph Ronan Royal Army Medical Corps
- Maj. William Robert Rook, Nottinghamshire and Derbyshire Regiment
- Temp Maj. Leslie Roseveare, Royal Engineers
- Capt. Angus Ross, Cameron Highlanders
- Quartermaster and Capt. Charles Thomas Ross, Royal Army Medical Corps
- Capt. William Henry Rowell, Royal Army Medical Corps
- Maj. Harry Lancelot Ruck-Keene DSO Oxfordshire and Buckinghamshire Light Infantry
- Capt. Ernest Gordon Russell, Royal Army Service Corps
- Capt. William Sydney Kemp Russell, Royal Sussex Regiment
- Capt. Percival Thomas Rutherford, Royal Army Medical Corps
- Maj. Thomas Geoffrey Ruttledge MC Connaught Rangers
- Maj. Robert Minturn Clarges Ruxton, Labour Corps
- Capt. Pierce Neimeyer Ryan, Royal Army Service Corps
- Rev. William Ryan, Royal Army Chaplains' Department
- Temp Capt. Herbert Henry Sampson MC Royal Army Medical Corps
- Temp Maj. Edmund Thomas Bandars
- Temp Capt. James Frances Sandon
- Temp Maj. William Roger Sanguinetti MC Royal Engineers
- Rev. William Henry Sarchet MC Royal Army Chaplains' Department
- Temp Maj. Ernest Satchwell, Royal Army Service Corps
- Temp Maj. Graham Francis Henry Satow, Machine Gun Corps
- Temp Capt. Hugh Ralph Satow
- Temp Capt. Harold Willis Scawin, Royal Army Medical Corps
- Temp Capt. Ellis Keith Scholtz, Royal Army Service Corps
- Temp Lt. Basil Ferdinand Jamieson Schonland, Royal Engineers
- Temp Lt.-Col. Norman Gibib Soorgie, Army Printing and Stationery Services
- Capt. David Jobson Scott MC Royal Army Medical Corps
- Temp Lt. Frank Scott, Royal Engineers
- Temp Lt.-Col. James Edward Scott, Indian Army Reserve of Officers
- Maj. John Creagh Scott DSO Argyll and Sutherland Highlanders
- Capt. Frank Sutherland Scruby, Cambridgeshire Regiment
- Temp Maj. Edward Wilmot Seale, Royal Engineers
- Capt. Philip Temple Sealy, Royal Army Service Corps
- Temp Capt. Edward James Selby, Royal Army Medical Corps
- Temp Lt. Martin Perronet Sells, Royal Engineers
- Lt. William Boyd Selous, Royal Garrison Artillery
- Quartermaster and Capt. Alfred George Shackleton, Royal Fusiliers
- Temp Capt. Herbert Park Shackleton, Royal Army Medical Corps
- Maj. Gerald Whittaker Sharpe, Royal Lancaster Regiment
- Lt. Frank Deeks Sharpies, Royal Army Service Corps
- Maj. Arthur Godfrey Shaw MC East Yorkshire Regiment
- Temp Maj. Thomas Alfred Shaw, Royal Engineers
- Helen Mildred Sheppard, Department Controller, Queen Mary's Army Auxiliary Corps
- Temp Capt. Frederick Walton Shilton
- Lt. Frederick Edgar Shipp, Royal Army Service Corps
- Temp Capt. John Kercheval Sidebottom, Royal Engineers
- Maj. Edward Herbert Simpson MC Liverpool Regiment
- Lt.-Col. George Charles Edward Simpson, Royal Army Medical Corps
- Temp Maj. Selwyn George Simpson, Royal Army Service Corps
- Lt.-Col. Harold Simson, Royal Army Medical Corps
- Temp Maj. Henry Arnott Sissons, Royal Engineers
- Temp Capt. Augustus William Smith
- Capt. Daniel Rowland Smith MC Royal Army Ordnance Corps
- Temp Capt. Felix Patrick Smith
- Capt. George William Smith, Royal Army Medical Corps
- Temp Maj. Isaac Claude Victor Smith, Royal Army Service Corps
- Lt.-Col. Samuel Boylan Smith DSO Royal Army Medical Corps
- Capt. Stanley Smith, Royal Army Service Corps
- Lt. Patrick Cecil Smythe, Royal Highlanders
- Capt. Gerald Merson Sorley, London Regiment
- Capt. Percy Lionel Spafford, Royal Army Service Corps
- Capt. Herbert Benjamin Speke, Northumberland Fusiliers
- Capt. Sidney George Spoor, Royal Army Service Corps
- Temp Capt. George Spyer
- Lt. Reginald Alfred Squires, King's Own Yorkshire Light Infantry
- Rev. James Stack, Royal Army Chaplains' Department
- Capt. Robert Humphry Stallard, Royal Engineers
- Capt. Sydney Stallard DSO London Regiment
- Temp Lt. Colin Lundin Stanhope
- Lt. Ernest Raymond Stanley, South Staffordshire Regiment
- Lt. Frank Charles Stannard DCM Royal Field Artillery
- Capt. Reginald Samuel Sherrard Statham, Royal Army Medical Corps
- Temp Lt. Gabriel Steel, Royal Engineers
- Lt.-Col. Guy Neville Stephen, Royal Army Medical Corps
- Capt. Edward James Stevens, Royal Artillery
- Temp Lt. Bertrand James Stevenson
- Capt. George Henderson Stevenson MC Royal Army Medical Corps
- Temp Maj. Aubrey George Battersby Stewart, Royal Army Ordnance Corps
- Temp Maj. Donald MacIver Stewart, Royal Engineers
- Quartermaster and Capt. William Henry Stewart, Manchester Regiment
- Capt. Ralph William Ewart Stockings, Royal Army Medical Corps
- Capt. Patrick Douglas Stirling MC West Riding Regiment
- Temp Capt. William Stirling, Royal Army Medical Corps
- Capt. William Stobie, Royal Army Medical Corps
- Capt. Hugh Charles Stockwell, Highland Light Infantry
- Temp Capt. Adrian Stokes DSO Royal Army Medical Corps
- Temp Capt. Henry Stokes, Royal Army Medical Corps
- Capt. Francis Holland Storr
- Temp Capt. George Stow, Royal Engineers
- Temp Capt. Granville Edward Stewart Streatfield DSO Royal Engineers
- Temp Capt. Edward Joseph Stuckey, Royal Army Medical Corps
- Capt. Robert Luambton Surtees, Shropshire Light Infantry
- Capt. Richard Woodward Swayne, Royal Army Medical Corps
- Lt.-Col. Michael James Sweetman, Labour Corps
- Capt. Stanley William Sykes MC
- Lt. John Symes, Devonshire Regiment
- Temp Lt.-Col. George John Tagg, Royal Engineers
- 2nd Lt. Harry Targett, Royal West Surrey Regiment
- Capt. William Tayleur, Shropshire Yeomanry
- Temp Maj. Alfred Jessie Taylor, Royal Army Service Corps
- Temp Capt. Douglas Compton Taylor, Royal Army Medical Corps
- Quartermaster and Capt. Douglas Percy Taylor, Royal Army Medical Corps
- Maj. Edgar Charles Taylor, Royal Engineers
- Temp Capt. Eric Stewart Taylor, Royal Army Medical Corps
- Temp Maj. Gordon Taylor, Royal Army Medical Corps
- Rev. Harold Milman Strickland Taylor, Royal Army Chaplains' Department
- Lt. Hugh Lamport Taylor, Royal Field Artillery
- Temp Capt. George Arthur James Teasdale, Royal Field Artillery
- Maj. Bartholomew Louis Charles Teeling, Royal Army Service Corps
- Temp Lt. Ernest William Dalrymple Tennant
- Maj. Henry Augustus Brelfney Ternan, East Kent Regiment
- Maj. Cyril Edward Terry, Royal Army Service Corps
- Maj. Noel Edmund Osbert Thackwell, Royal Garrison Artillery
- Temp Capt. Bernard Henry Thomas, Royal Army Service Corps
- Lt. Percy Edward Thomas, Royal Engineers
- Rev. Richard Albert Thomas, Royal Army Chaplains' Department
- Temp Capt. Robert John Thomas, Royal Engineers
- Capt. Arthur Landsborough Thomson
- Temp Maj. Edward Thompson, Royal Engineers
- Temp Capt. James Osbourne Thompson, late King's Own Yorkshire Light Infantry
- Temp Quartermaster and Capt. Walter Wright Thompson, Lancashire Fusiliers
- Temp Capt. Leslie Thorns MC
- Temp Lt. Basil Albert Thornton
- Lt.-Col. John Claud Thorp DSO Royal Army Ordnance Corps
- Capt. John Henry Thorpe, Manchester Regiment
- Lt. Claude Tizard MC Royal Berkshire Regiment
- Temp Capt. Arthur Theodore Todd Royal Army Medical Corps
- Temp Capt. Sam Todd
- Capt. Leonard Robert Tosswill, Royal Army Medical Corps
- Lt. Philip Henry Townsend, Royal Army Service Corps
- Maj. James Paumier Tredennick DSO Royal Dublin Fusiliers
- Capt. Horace Edgar Howard Tripp, Royal Army Service Corps
- Temp Maj. Roy Francis Truscott
- Maj. Frederick Gordon Tucker, London Regiment
- Temp Capt. Gerald Tudor, Labour Corps
- Temp Capt. Claude Lewie Devenish Tully
- Temp Capt. Francis Gordon Turner MC
- Lt. George Cunningham Tylor, Royal Field Artillery
- Very Rev. Canon Hon Leonard Francis Tyrwhitt MVO Royal Army Chaplains' Department
- Lt. Owen Underbill, Shropshire Light Infantry
- Temp Capt. Richard Lewis Unsworth, Royal Army Service Corps
- Temp Lt. Thomas Haynes Upton, Royal Engineers
- Capt. Lyndall Fownes Urwick MC Worcestershire Regiment
- Capt. Albert Robert Valon MC Royal Army Ordnance Corps
- Temp Maj. Arthur Owen Vaughan DSO labour Corps
- Quartermaster and Capt. Frank Veal, West Yorkshire Regiment
- Temp Capt. Philip Northcote Vellacott, Royal Army Medical Corps
- Temp Capt. Hugh Whatley Stevens Venn, West Kent Yeomanry
- Lt. Edmund Vercoe, Royal Garrison Artillery
- Maj. John Ellis Viccars DSO Leicestershire Regiment
- Temp Maj. William Henry Vickress DSO Royal Army Service Corps
- Lt. Thomas Whitehaire Vigers MC Royal Engineers
- Temp Maj. Sydney Vincent, Labour Corps
- Lt. Arthur Cyril Waddy, Royal Field Artillery
- Capt. Douglas Wain
- Lt. Edwin Moira Wainwright, Royal Munster Fusiliers
- Temp Capt. Edward McAllen Walker, Royal Field Artillery
- Temp Lt. George Walker MC Royal Engineers
- Maj. John Douglas Glen Walker DSO Royal Highlanders
- Maj. Forbes Thompson Wallace, Royal Highlanders
- Temp Maj. Edgar Hardress Waller, Royal Army Service Corps
- Temp Capt. William Arnold Wallinger
- Temp Capt. Charles Wilmot Wanklyn-James, Royal Army Medical Corps
- Temp Lt. David Bruce Warren
- Temp Lt. Philip Ridedale Warren, Royal Engineers
- Capt. William Robert Vaughton Warren MC Royal Army Service Corps
- Maj. Walter James Waters, Royal Army Medical Corps
- Temp Capt. Ernest Alfred William Watney MBE
- Capt. Forrester Colvin Watson MC 3rd Hussars
- Temp Capt. William Frank Watson, Royal Army Service Corps
- Lt. James Percy Wattleworth, Royal Field Artillery
- Lt.-Col. Lowther Watts, Liverpool Regiment
- Temp Lt. Frank Goutts Webster, Royal Army Ordnance Corps
- Temp Lt. Noel Edwin Webster MC Nottinghamshire and Derbyshire Regiment
- Capt. and Bt. Maj. Aubrey Pattisson Wallman Wedd, Royal Engineers
- Capt. Robert Yaxley Weir, Lovat's Scouts
- Quartermaster and Capt. Arthur George Wells DCM Royal Army Service Corps
- Capt. and Bt. Maj. Charles Alexander Wells, Hampshire Regiment
- Temp Capt. Frank William Wesley, Royal Army Medical Corps
- Temp Capt. Reginald Granville Westmacott MBE
- Temp Capt. Thomas Horatio Westmacott
- Temp Lt. Henry Harold Wheatley MC Royal Engineers
- Temp Maj. Stanley White Whiffen, Royal Army Service Corps
- Capt. Walter Kennedy Whigham, North Staffordshire Regiment
- Maj. Charles Francis White, Royal Army Medical Corps
- Maj. Edwin E. White, Royal Army Service Corps
- Capt. George Gilmour White
- Lt. John White, Royal Engineers
- Capt. and Bt. Maj. Maurice FitzGibbon Grove-White DSO Royal Engineers
- Temp Capt. Maurice Henry Whiting, Royal Army Medical Corps
- Maj. Valentine George Whitla, 3rd Hussars
- Quartermaster and Capt. John Wickersham, Royal Army Medical Corps
- Maj. Henry William Cairns Wicks DSO Seaforth Highlanders
- Temp 2nd Lt. Andrew James Widderson
- Temp Lt. Raymond Wilkins, Royal Army Ordnance Corps
- Capt. Kenneth Douglas Wilkinson, Royal Army Medical Corps
- Temp Capt. Noel Read Ellershaw Wilkinson, Royal Army Service Corps
- Temp Capt. Frank Stanley Wilks, Royal Army Service Corps
- Temp Lt. Albert Henry Williams, Royal Army Ordnance Corps
- Quartermaster and Capt. Alfred Edwin Williams
- Maj. Archard Trevor Williams, Royal Army Service Corps
- Lt. Frank Harry Williams MC Royal Engineers
- Lt. Henry Claude Williams, Royal Army Service Corps
- Maj. Arthur Peere Williams-Freeman DSO Duke of Cornwall's Light Infantry
- Capt. Archibald Wilson MC Royal Army Medical Corps
- Acting Maj. Arthur Ernest Wilson
- Temp Capt. George Gatherer Wilson, Labour Corps
- Temp Capt. John Alexander Wilson, Royal Army Medical Corps
- Temp Maj. John Stewart Wilson, Royal Engineers
- Rev. Piers Holt Wilson, Royal Army Chaplains' Department
- Temp Capt. Stanley Brooke Winch, Royal Army Ordnance Corps
- Maj. George Edward Windeatt, Devonshire Regiment
- Temp Capt. Francis Arthur Winder, Royal Army Medical Corps
- Temp Capt. Frederick Butwell Winfield, Royal Army Medical Corps
- Temp Maj. Henry Philip Wolff, Labour Corps
- Maj. and Bt. Lt.-Col. Walter Gordon Wolridge Gordon, Royal Highlanders
- Temp Capt. George Jervis Wood
- Temp Lt. James Henry Wood, Royal Army Ordnance Corps
- Capt. John Edward Wood, West Riding Regiment
- Capt. John Lawrence Wood, Royal Army Medical Corps
- Minnie Wood RRC Sister-in-Charge, Queen Alexandra's Imperial Military Nursing Service
- Temp Capt. William Lyon Wood, Royal Engineers
- Lt. John Surry Woodger, Royal Army Service Corps
- Temp Capt. Vivian John Woodward
- Capt. Edward Saville Woolf, Royal Army Service Corps
- Capt. Edward Wooll, Cheshire Yeomanry
- Rev. Edward Percival Woollcombe, Royal Army Chaplains' Department
- Temp Maj. Ivor William Woolley, Royal Army Service Corps
- Temp Lt. Stanley Herbert Cunliffe Woolrych
- Capt. and Maj. John Penry Garnons Worlledge, Royal Engineers
- Temp Capt. Arthur John Wright, Royal Army Ordnance Corps
- Capt. John Henry Wright, Royal Army Veterinary Corps
- Lt. Charles Seymour Wright MC Royal Engineers
- Temp Maj. Ernest Trevor Langebear Wright DSO Royal Army Service Corps
- Temp Maj. Travers Carey Wyatt, Royal Army Service Corps
- Maj. Arthur St. John Yates MC Royal Engineers
- Temp Capt. John Henry Yates, Royal Army Veterinary Corps
- Temp Capt. Henry Yellowlees, Royal Army Medical Corps
- Rev. Erik Esskildsen Yelyerton, Royal Army Chaplains' Department
- Lt. John Yorke, Royal Field Artillery
- Rev. Stanislaus Dominic Young DSO Royal Army Chaplains' Department

Canadian Overseas Forces

- Quartermaster and Hon Capt. Thomas Stuart Acheson, Manitoba Regiment
- Maj. Kay Alexander, Canadian Railway Troops
- Capt. Jesse Allen, Canadian Infantry
- Maj. John Douglas Armour, Canadian Artillery
- Maj. John Clements Ball DSO Canadian Artillery
- Lt.-Col. Allan Edward Kingston Bennett, Canadian Army Medical Corps
- Capt. James Bdssett, Canadian Army Service Corps
- Maj. Wilfred Bovy, Canadian Infantry
- Capt. Edmund Albert Burke, Quebec Regiment
- Maj. Leslie dement Carey, Alberta Regiment
- Hon Capt. William Carroll Ch.D
- Maj. Eric James Church, Canadian Army Service Corps
- Maj. John George Cline, Canadian Machine Gun Corps
- Capt. Cyril Prichard Colville, Canadian Army Pay Corps
- Maj. Henry Sloane Cooper MC Central Ontario Regiment
- Maj. Frederic Joseph Delaute, Quebec Regiment
- Capt. Joseph Rene Jacques Duhault, Canadian Army Veterinary Corps
- Lt.-Col. Archibald Earchinan DSO Canadian Railway Troops
- Maj. Arthur William Mickle Ellis, Canadian Army Medical Corps
- Capt. Cyril Woodland Erlebach, British Columbia Regiment
- Lt.-Col. William Henry de la Tour d'Auvergne Findlay DSO Canadian Army Service Corps
- Capt. Harold Bruce Findley, Canadian Army Dental Corps
- Capt. Wilfred Josiah Finney, Canadian Field Artillery
- Quartermaster and Hon Capt. Albert Percy Foster, British Columbia Regiment
- Lt.-Col. Andrew Hamilton Gault DSO Princess Patricia's Canadian Light Infantry
- Maj. George Reginald Geary, 58th Canadian Infantry Battalion
- Capt. FitzRoy George, Quebec Regiment
- Lt.-Col. William Waring Primrose Gibsone DSO CMG Nova Scotia Regiment
- Maj. Edward Montgomery Gordon, Canadian Army Service Corps
- Capt. Vivien Horace Graham, Canadian Army Service Corps
- Temp Maj. Thomas Hale, Canadian Forestry Corps
- Temp Capt. Hermann Alfred Hardy, Canadian Army Service Corps
- Capt. William Harty, Canadian Field Artillery
- Capt. Harold Herbert, Saskatchewan Regiment
- Temp Maj. Walter Herd, Canadian Forestry Corps
- Maj. Basil Herbert John Irwin, Canadian Forestry Corps
- Capt. John Gordon Jack, Canadian Army Service Corps
- Maj. George Leslie Jennings, Royal North West Mounted Police
- Capt. Benjamin James Johnston, 49th Canadian Bm
- Maj. Arthur Llewelyn Jones MC Canadian Army Medical Corps
- Maj. Lorne Fauntleroy Jones, Canadian Army Medical Corps
- Lt.-Col. Hubert Kemmis Betty DSO Royal Canadian Regiment
- Capt. Lucien Lacroix, Canadian Army Pay Corps
- Capt. Arthur Henry Whittington Landon MC Royal Canadian Regiment
- Acting Capt. Gerald Ross Larkin, Canadian Army Service Corps
- Maj. Archibald Brands Macaulay, Canadian Army Medical Corps
- Rev. Arthur Huffman McGreer MC Canadian Army Chaplains' Department
- Capt. Donald McGugan MC Manchester Regiment
- Capt. Donald Morrison MacKay, Canadian Army Ordnance Corps
- Lt.-Col. John William Herbert McKinery DSO Quebec Regiment
- Capt. Cecil Gordon Mackinnon, Canadian Army Service Corps
- Capt. William Hamilton McMurray MC Canadian Engineers
- Temp Maj. James Howard McNeil, Canadian Forestry Corps
- Capt. William Wright Main, 1st Canadian Motor Machine Gun Corps
- Quartermaster and Hon Capt. Harry A. Marshall, Canadian Army Medical Corps
- Capt. JamesFrederick Stewart Marshal MC Canadian Army Medical Corps
- Capt. Herbert Walter Martin, Canadian Army Medical Corps
- Maj. Douglas Herbert Campbell Mason DSO Central Ontario Regiment
- Capt. Robert Gordon Mathews, Canadian Army Pay Corps
- Maj. Ernest Wallace Mermagen, Manchester Regiment
- Temp Capt. Arthur William Morton, Canadian Army Service Corps
- Rev. John Joseph O'Gorman, Canadian Army Chaplains' Department
- Capt. Richard Benjamin O'Sullivan, Canadian Army Pay Corps
- Maj. James Grannis Parmelee, Canadian Army Service Corps
- Capt. James Burleigh Pattullo, Canadian Army Pay Corps
- Capt. Gilbert Livennore Pearson, Canadian Army Pay Corps
- Temp Maj. David Philpot DSO 7th Canadian Infantry Battalion
- Capt. Marvin James Preston, Canadian Army Veterinary Corps
- Lt. Kenneth Allan Ramsay DSO Canadian Engineers
- Lt.-Col. Clifford Hamilton Reason DSO Canadian Army Medical Corps
- Temp Lt. William John Duane Reed-Lewis, Canadian Railway Troops
- Capt. Frederick Richardson, Manchester Regiment
- Capt. William Augustus Richardson, Canadian Army Medical Corps
- Maj. James Richardson Roaf, Canadian Engineers
- Maj. Russell Butler Robertson, Canadian Army Medical Corps
- Rev. Allan Shatford, Canadian Army Chaplains' Department
- Maj. Richard Stephenson Smith, Canadian Engineers
- Capt. Felix Musgrave Sowden, Canadian Army Service Corps
- Capt. Bertram John William Spink, CanadianArmy Pay Department
- Lt.-Col. Daniel William Bigelows Spry, Manchester Regiment
- Maj. John Douglas Reginald Stewart, Alberta Regiment
- Maj. Peter Donald Stewart, Canadian Army Medical Corps
- Capt. James Still, Canadian Army Pay Corps
- Maj. Samuel James Stredght, Canadian Army Medical Corps
- Capt. John Leslie Sugden, Canadian Army Service Corps
- Temp Lt.-Col. David Soley Tamblyn DSO Canadian Army Veterinary Corps
- Maj. William John Taylor, Canadian Army Pay Corps
- Capt. William Frederick Towill, Canadian Army Veterinary Corps
- Capt. Thomas Kingsmill Wade, Canadian Army Service Corps
- Quartermaster and Hon Capt. William Waldron, Canadian Forestry Corps
- Quartermaster and Hon Capt. John Stanley Ward, Canadian Army Medical Corps
- Capt. William Wilfred Worthington, 15th Canadian Battalion
- Lt.-Col. Fred Armstrong Young, Canadian Army Medical Corps

Australian Imperial Forces

- Capt. Charles Hubert Bath
- Capt. George Bell, Australian Army Medical Corps
- Maj. Ernest Gladstone Blanshard, Australian Army Pay Corps
- Maj. Edward Harry Bushell, Australian Infantry
- Capt. James Austin Chapman, Australian Infantry
- Quartermaster and Hon Capt. Edward Henry Dike, 3rd Australia Pnr. Battalion, Australian Imperial Force
- Capt. John William Farrar, Australian Army Medical Corps
- Lt.-Col. Piers Fiaschi, Australian Army Medical Corps
- Maj. Walker Arnold Le Roy Fry, Australian Imperial Force
- Capt. Alexander McPhee Greenlees MC A.E
- Maj. John Leslie Hardie DSO
- Capt. Charles Henry Harrison MC Australian Imperial Force
- Capt. Henry Coromandel Watsford Harrison, Australian Army Service Corps
- Maj. Walter Jack, Australian Army Ordnance Corps
- Maj. Edward Stewart James, Australian Army Veterinary Corps
- Maj. Robert Kerr DSO Australian Army Service Corps
- Maj. Frederick Donald Herbert Blois Lawton, Australian Army Medical Corps
- Maj. Robert Hall Forman Macindoe, Australian Army Veterinary Corps
- Lt.-Col. Charles Henry Ernest Manning DSO Australian Army Service Corps
- Maj. Thomas Reginald Mellor, Australian Field Artillery
- Lt. Roy Morrell DSO Australian Machine Gun Corps
- Capt. Arnold Meredith Moulden, Australian Infantry
- Maj. Hector Alexander Nugent DSO Australian Army Service Corps
- Capt. Gordon Peters, Australian Infantry
- Maj. Thomas Alfred Jack Playfair DSO Australian Field Artillery
- Maj. Eric Clive Pegus Plant DSO Australian Infantry
- Capt. Paul William Simonson, Australian Imperial Force
- Lt.-Col. Valentine Osborne Stacy, Australian Army Medical Corps
- Capt. Walter Ormond Stevenson, Australian Army Service Corps
- Capt. Colin Quintrell Taplin, Australian Imperial Force
- Capt. Frederick Usher John Tinkler MC Australian Engineers
- Capt. Harry Ortom Townsend, Australian Imperial Force
- Capt. Henry Edward Trousselot, Australian Imperial Force
- Capt. Herbert Ward Wilson MC Australia Militia
- Maj. Alexander Wynyard-Joss, Australian Army Service Corps

New Zealand Forces

- Maj. Peter Maxwell Edgar, N.Z.V.C
- Capt. Charles Ingram Gossage, NZ Army Ordnance Corps
- Maj. George Rowland Hutchinson, NZ Army Service Corps
- Maj. David McCurdy, Otago Mounted Rifles
- Capt. Allan Stanley Muk, Wellington
- Maj. Harold Avery Reid, N.Z.V.C
- Maj. Hugh Vickerman DSO N.Z.R.E.

South African Forces

- Temp Capt. Ernest Bowles MBE S.A.E.F
- Quartermaster and Capt. Cecil Stevenson Cameron MC SA Labour Corps
- Lt. Frederick Collins MC SA Engineers
- Temp Lt.-Col. Joseph James Gheere Emmett, SA Nat. Labour Corps
- Temp Lt.-Col. Alfred Fawcus, SA Nat. Labour Corps
- Temp Capt. William Louis Geddes, SA Labour Corps
- Maj. John James FitzGerald Harris, SA
- Temp Lt.-Col. Jan Jacobsz, SA Nat. Lab Corps
- Rev John Lennox, SA Nat. Labour Corps
- Capt. Henry Edmund Marshall, 1st Cape Coloured Lab Regiment
- Temp Capt. Findlay McKay Ross MC SA Engineers
- Maj. Harper Sproule, 1st Cape Col. Lab Battalion
- Lt.-Col. George Henry Usmar, SA Medical Corps

Newfoundland Overseas Forces

- Temp Capt. Hector Roy McNeill, Newfoundland Regiment
- Maj. William Grant Thomson, New Brunswick Regiment

==== For valuable services rendered in connection with military operations in Italy ====
- Maj. Ronald Forbes Adam DSO Royal Field Artillery
- Temp Capt. Guy Arthur Eustace Argles, Royal Army Service Corps
- Maj. Clifford Allan Baily, Essex Regiment
- Quartermaster and Capt. Owen King Belchem MC Royal West Surrey Regiment
- Temp Capt. Herbert Hillel Berlandina MC Royal Engineers
- Temp 2nd Lt. John Francis Bowen
- Capt. Clive Kingsley Boyd, Royal Army Service Corps
- Maj. Charles Bramhall, Royal Army Medical Corps
- Temp Maj. Montagu Wilhelm Brown
- Capt. Langley Browning MC Royal Artillery
- Temp Capt. Peter Burton Buckley MC Royal Engineers
- Rev. Richard Urban Butler, Royal Army Chaplains' Department
- Temp Capt. Patrick Alphonsus Carroll, Royal Army Veterinary Corps
- Maj. The Hon Arthur Claud Spencer Chichester DSO Irish Guards
- Rev. Anthony William Chute, Royal Army Chaplains' Department
- Capt. Myer Coplans DSO Royal Army Medical Corps
- Maj. Joseph Curling, Royal Field Artillery
- Lt. Moses Davids, Worcestershire Regiment
- Temp Lt.-Col. Robert William Day DSO
- Temp Maj. Louis Emmanuel Jean Guy de Savoie Carignan de Soissons
- Temp Maj. Frederick Frank Dikon
- Temp Capt. Richard Seymour Vivian Dyas
- Temp Maj. William Martin Evans MC Royal Engineers
- Temp Maj. FitzRoy Farquhar
- Temp Capt. and Bt. Maj. Wallace Ferguson, Royal Engineers
- Maj. James Forrest CMG late Lincolnshire Regiment
- Capt. Francis Kerielm Foster, Gloucestershire Regiment
- Temp Maj. Henry Edward Fulford, Royal Army Service Corps
- Temp Lt. Gardner, George Herbert, Army Printing and Stationery Services
- Temp Capt. Edward Alfred Gates, Royal Army Medical Corps
- Maj. Thomas Holroyd Gibbon Royal Army Medical Corps
- Capt. Alan Keith Gibson MC Oxfordshire and Buckinghamshire Light Infantry
- Capt. John Galbraith Gill DSO MC Royal Army Medical Corps
- Lt. Cyril Julian Goldsmid, 9th Lancers
- Capt. Hugh Henry Grindley, Royal Field Artillery
- Capt. George Herbert Grinsell, Royal Army Service Corps
- Temp Capt. Archibald James Gwatkin
- Temp Maj. Gordon Willis Hayter, Royal Army Service Corps
- Maj. Alfred Scott Hewitt DSO Royal West Kent Regiment
- Capt. James Joseph Hilliard, Royal Army Veterinary Corps
- Temp Lt. Miles Staveley Hopkinson, Army Pay Department
- Temp Capt. Sydney Charles Horton, Royal Army Service Corps
- Rev. Randolph Hughes, Royal Army Chaplains' Department
- Capt. George Noel Hunter, London Regiment
- Temp Capt. John Duckworth Irving MC West Yorkshire Regiment
- Temp Capt. Harold Frank Ivory, Royal Army Service Corps
- Temp Capt. John Jardine FRCSE Royal Army Medical Corps
- Capt. Robert Hunter Jeff, East Yorkshire Regiment
- Lt. Augustine Henry Keenan MC Royal Highlanders
- Temp Maj. Harold Kenworthy, Royal Engineers
- Temp Maj. Neville Leese DSO Royal Army Service Corps
- Capt. The Hon Piers Walter Legh, Grenadier Guards
- Temp Capt. Algernon George Le Mesurier
- Temp Maj. Lewis Richard Lipsett, Royal Army Service Corps
- Maj. Sydney Joseph Lowe DSO Royal Fusiliers
- Temp Capt. Reginald Hutchinson Lucas MC Royal Army Medical Corps
- Rev. Robert James McCliment, Royal Army Chaplains' Department
- Capt. William John Richardson Matthews, Manchester Regiment
- Capt. Charles Mitchell DSO Grenadier Guards
- Capt. and Bt. Maj. Edwin Logie Morris MC Royal Engineers
- Rev. Thomas Carlyle Murphy, Royal Army Chaplains' Department
- Temp Lt. Leslie Cuthbert Newton, Royal Army Ordnance Corps
- Temp Capt. Charles Carlyon Nicholl, Royal Army Service Corps
- Temp Capt. Reginald Frank Parker MC
- Temp Capt. William Ashley Parkes, Royal Army Service Corps
- Temp Capt. Charles Kendall Phillips
- Quartermaster and Capt. Harry Plews, Royal Sussex Regiment
- Capt. Benjamin Henry Potter MC Royal Garrison Artillery
- Temp Maj. Eugene Ramsden
- Capt. William Henry Rean, Royal Engineers
- Maj. Arthur George Rolleston, Royal Field Artillery
- Lt. Leonard James Sarjeant
- Capt. Frank Arthur Sclater MC Royal Engineers
- Rev. Henry George Hastings Shaddick, Royal Army Chaplains' Department
- Maj. and Bt. Lt.-Col. George Edward Sharp, Army Pay Department
- Temp Capt. Edgar Leonard Shoetensack, Royal Army Ordnance Corps
- Maj. Humphrey Etwall Smyth DSO Royal Army Ordnance Corps
- Temp Capt. Ethelbert Ambrook Southee, Royal Army Service Corps
- Temp Maj. George Stretton Spurrier DSO Royal Army Service Corps
- Lt. Cyril Ernest Stearns, King's Royal Rifle Corps
- Lt. Arthur Gerard Rhodes Sentance Tapp MC Royal Field Artillery
- Temp Capt. Trevor Meredytih Chatty Thomas MC Suffolk Regiment
- Capt. John Arthur Stuart Tillard MC Royal Engineers
- Temp Capt. Walter Frederick Wackrill, Royal Engineers
- Capt. John Clive Williams, Royal West Surrey Regiment
- Temp Capt. Arnot Milne Wilson, Royal Army Service Corps
- Lt.-Col. Hubert Malcolm Wilson TD Cheshire Yeomanry
- Capt. Richard Guy Cecil Yerburgh, Irish Guards

==== For valuable services rendered in connection with military operations in German South West Africa ====
- Col. Arthur Willie Cumming, 18th Mounted Rifles
- Maj. William Jan Klerck, 4th Mounted Brigade
- Lt.-Col. Andries Langebrink, Union Reserve of Officers
- Maj. Richard Granville Nicholson, 3rd Mounted Brigade

==== For valuable services rendered in connection with military operations in Mesopotamia ====
Capt. Robert Edward Alderman CIE Indian Army Reserve of Officers

- Maj. William Rex Ames, 1/4th Rajputs, Indian Army
- Maj. Claud John Eyre Auchinleck DSO 62nd Punjabis, Indian Army
- Temp Maj. Edward Leonard Bagshawe CIE DSO Royal Engineers
- Capt. George Charles Bampfield, 90th Punjabis, Indian Army
- Maj. Allen Gilbert Bartholomew, Middlesex Regiment
- Lt. Alec Jeffrey Bell, Indian Army Reserve of Officers
- Capt. Herbert Bell, Royal Engineers
- Lt. George Bispham MBE Indian Army Reserve of Officers
- Capt. Henry Blackwell, 106th Hazara Pioneers
- Capt. Arthur Locke Blake, Somerset Light Infantry
- Sister Nellie Blew RRC Queen Alexandra's Imperial Military Nursing Service
- Maj. John Body DSO East Kent Regiment
- Lt.-Col. Walter Fitzgerald Bourne, Royal Jat Light Infantry, Indian Army
- Lt. Percy Brooke Bramley CIE Indian Army Reserve of Officers
- Temp Lt. Sydney Haynes Bridcut, Royal Engineers
- Capt. Robert Norman Dymoke Broad, 5th Gurkha Rifles, Indian Army Reserve of Officers
- Maj. Thomas Fleetwood Brook, Supply and Transport Corps, Indian Army
- Temp Capt. James Hardy Brown DSO
- Temp Lt. John Bayley Fairfax Brown, Royal Engineers
- Lt. Denis Robert Howe Browne, Indian Army Reserve of Officers
- Rev. Ernest Graham Brownrigg MBE Royal Army Chaplains' Department
- Capt. Alexander Henderson Burn, 59th Scinde Rifles, Indian Army
- Temp Capt. William George Burn, Royal Engineers
- Maj. Christopher Wyndowe Bushell, Royal Engineers
- Temp Capt. Joseph Aloysius Callaghan, South Lancashire Regiment
- Capt. John Maurice Hardman Campbell, Royal Army Medical Corps
- Temp Lt. Arthur Frederick Neale Chandler, Royal Army Ordnance Corps
- Temp Quartermaster and Capt. Joseph James Christie
- Lt. Arthur John Clarke MC DCM Norfolk Regiment
- Temp Capt. Aubrey Martin Clarke, Gloucestershire Regiment
- Maj. Richard Charles Clarke MC Supply and Transport Corps, Indian Army
- Capt. Reginald Ernest Coleman, Middlesex Regiment
- Maj. Percy Lovel Coleridge, 1/80th Carnatic Infantry, Indian Army
- Capt. Williams Corner, Royal Army Medical Corps
- Maj. Hamilton Maxwell Cruddas CMG Indian Medical Service
- Lt.-Col. Robert John Coming DSO 148th Pioneers, Indian Army
- Capt. and Bt. Maj. Arthur Marston Daniels, 3rd Skinner's Horse, Indian Army
- Lt. John Davidson, Supply and Transport Corps, Indian Army Reserve of Officers
- Lt. William Davisi, Supply and Transport Corps, Indian Army Reserve of Officers
- Department Commander and Hon Capt. Frank Donald Dawson, I. Misc. List
- Maj. Guy Tullock Dennys, 31st Punjabis, Indian Army
- Temp Capt. Albert Henry Frederick De Woolfson, Royal Engineers
- Capt. William Barnard Drake, South Wales Borderers
- Capt. Francis Grenville Drew, Royal Engineers
- Capt. and Bt. Maj. Leslie Dunbar Royal Army Medical Corps
- Maj. and Bt. Lt.-Col. Patrick Henry Dundas DSO Royal Jat Light Infantry, Indian Army
- Capt. Wilfred James Dunri, Royal Army Medical Corps
- Rev. William Alexander Dunnett, Royal Army Chaplains' Department
- Maj. Harold Exham, 7th Gurkha Rifles, Indian Army
- Maj. Lionel Arthur Fanshawo DSO Royal Artillery
- Maj. Edward Stanton Henry Ferry, 22nd Bengal and N.W. Railway, Indian Army
- Capt. Cecil James Fisher DSC Middlesex Regiment
- Capt. Arthur Fitzgerald, Supply and Transport Corps, Indian Army
- Capt. Hugh Lidwell Flack, Royal Army Service Corps
- Capt. Cyril Flowers, Royal Field Artillery
- Lt.-Col. John George Foster Royal Army Medical Corps
- Lt.-Col. Francis Edward Fremantle, Royal Army Medical Corps
- Capt. Herbert Leslie Garson MC Royal Army Medical Corps
- Lt. Eric Norman Goddard, 107th Pioneers, Indian Army
- Capt. and Bt. Maj. Alfred Rmde Godwin-Austen MC South Wales Borderers
- Capt. Frederic Lawrence Gore, 113th Infantry, Indian Army
- Maj. Glynn Grylls, Royal Artillery
- Lt. Reuben Henry Gwyn-Williams MC Royal Welsh Fusiliers
- Temp Capt. Henry Clement Hadrill, Royal Army Service Corps
- Temp Maj. Leonard Joseph Hall, Royal Engineers
- Capt. Sidney Lewis Hall, Royal Field Artillery
- Capt. Kenneth O'Brien Harding, Indian Army
- Temp Capt. Archibald John Harris, Royal Engineers
- Maj. Adair Colpoys Hoslop MC Royal Garrison Artillery
- Rev. Hamilton Dunston Henderson, Royal Army Chaplains' Department
- Capt. Frank Higson, Norfolk Regiment
- Capt. Morton Biles, Wiltshire Regiment
- Rev. Richard Senior Hipwell, Royal Army Chaplains' Department
- Rev. Edmund Joseph Hobson, Royal Army Chaplains' Department
- Maj. Reginald Thomas Keble Hodge, Duke of Cornwall's Light Infantry
- Capt. Henry Porter Wolseley Hutson DSO MC Royal Engineers
- Maj. Charles Robert Ingram DSO Royal West Kent Regiment
- Quartermaster and Capt. Charles Herbert Inwood MC Worcestershire Regiment
- Rev. Percival Walter James, Royal Army Chaplains' Department
- Lt. Oswald Duke Jarvis Royal Army Medical Corps
- Capt. Jordan Constantino John Indian Medical Service
- Capt. Charles Grey Peyton Jones, Royal Garrison Artillery
- Temp Capt. Sydney Herbert Jones
- Maj. and Bt. Lt.-Col. Charles Kirkpatrick, Corps of Guides, Indian Army
- Capt. George Henry Knowland, Indian Army
- Capt. Cecil John Rhodes Lawrence, Royal Army Veterinary Corps
- Temp Capt. Kenneth Lightfoot, Royal Engineers
- Capt. Donald Hector Colin MacArthur Royal Army Medical Corps
- Lt. William MacDermott, Royal Horse Artillery
- Temp Lt. Ian Thomas Aliston MacDonald, Royal Army Service Corps
- Capt. Nioll Austin MacGurk, Indian Army Reserve of Officers
- Capt. Edwin Gray MacHutchon, Royal Engineers
- Temp Capt. Archibald MacMillan, Royal Army Medical Corps
- Capt. and Bt. Maj. William McNaughtan Royal Army Medical Corps
- Rev. Duncan Gordon MacPherson, Royal Army Chaplains' Department
- Rev. Joihn Mainwaring, Royal Army Chaplains' Department
- Capt. Robert Wardlaw Manderson, 3rd Skinner's Horse
- Lt. Hugh Marr MC South Wales Borderers
- Temp Capt. Donald James Marriott, Royal Engineers
- Maj. Percy Alexander Maxwell, 1st Brahmans, Indian Army
- Temp Capt. Archibald Thomas Miller, Machine Gun Corps
- 2nd Lt. John Alfred Tennant Miller, 14th Hussars
- Temp Maj. Thomas Maxwell Stuart Milne-Henderson, Royal Engineers
- Capt. and Bt. Maj. Valentine Elkin Mocatta, 14th Hussars
- Capt. John Barre de Winton Molony Indian Medical Service
- Rev. John Patrick Molony MC Royal Army Chaplains' Department
- Maj. Joseph Rando M. Mullings, Royal Field Artillery
- Maj. Edward Brodie Munro Indian Medical Service
- Temp Capt. Stuart Murray, Royal Army Medical Corps
- Temp Quartermaster and Capt. Harry Edwin Newton Niblett DCM
- Capt. Earle McKillop Nicholl, Royal Army Veterinary Corps
- Capt. Reginald Latham Nicholls, Indian Army Reserve of Officers
- Capt. Ralph Nield, Indian Army Reserve of Officers
- Capt. Joseph O'Brien, Indian Army Reserve of Officers
- Lt.-Col. Charles William O'Bryen, Indian Army
- Maj. Charles William Gustavis Palmer, Hampshire Regiment
- Rev. William Robert Park CIE Royal Army Chaplains' Department
- Temp Maj. Edwin Charles Lewis Parker, Royal Army Service Corps
- Hon Maj. Henry Pepper, Misc. List, Indian Army
- Temp Maj. Percy Gwynedd Porteous, Royal Engineers
- Capt. Jack Mervyn Pritchard, Royal West Kent Regiment
- Temp Maj. Arthur Havard Protheroe MC Royal Army Service Corps
- Quartermaster and Capt. Ernest John Ward Reader, Royal West Surrey Regiment
- Capt. Henry Gordon Redman, Wiltshire Regiment
- Lt. George Stanley Reed MC Indian Army Reserve of Officers
- Maj. Walter Clarke Reid, 32nd Lancers, Indian Army
- Temp Capt. Ernest Brayley Reynolds, Royal Army Veterinary Corps
- Capt. Percy Rothera, 29th South India Railway Battalion, Indian Army
- Lt. Arthur Fitzgerald Rountree MBE Indian Army Reserve of Officers
- Maj. Herbert Wynyard Rowlandson, 82nd Punjabis, Indian Army
- Maj. Harry William Russell Royal Army Medical Corps
- Capt. Arthur Meyer Sassoon MC 13th Hussars
- Temp Capt. Frank Greaves Sell wood, Royal Army Service Corps
- Temp Maj. Ernest William Skinner, Royal Army Medical Corps
- Lt. John Smith Sloper, Royal Army Medical Corps
- Capt. Edward Percival Allman Smith MC Royal Army Medical Corps
- Capt. Donald Bradley Somerville, Middlesex Regiment
- Capt. William Patrick Spens, Royal West Surrey Regiment
- Maj. Harry Daniel Muhldoroff Stevenson MC Supply and Transport Corps, Indian Army
- Maj. William Archibald Stewart, Middlesex Regiment
- Capt. Guy Stoddart, 104th Wellesley's Rifles, Indian Army
- Lt. Hugh Gabriel Stokes, Indian Army Reserve of Officers
- Maj. Alan Gething Stone MC 3rd Gurkha Rifles, Indian Army
- Capt. Hugh Frederic Stoneham, East Surrey Regiment
- Capt. Arthur Clifton DSO Royal Engineers Sykes
- Maj. Maurice O'Connor Tandy DSO Royal Engineers
- Temp Capt. Cedric Rowland Taylor MC Royal Army Medical Corps
- Maj. Thomas Temple, Royal Engineers
- Temp Maj. Courtney Eleves Theobald, Royal Army Service Corps
- Lt. Shirley John Montague Tuke, Royal Army Service Corps
- Lt.-Commander Lionel Richard William Tusmell Turbett, Royal Indian Marines
- Maj. Norman Dunbar Walker, Royal Army Medical Corps
- Rev. Raymond Elliston Walker, Royal Army Chaplains' Department
- Rev. Frank John Wilkey MC Royal Army Chaplains' Department
- Rev. Claude Bertram Warren, Royal Army Chaplains' Department
- Maj. Charles Percival Fenwick Warton, Indian Army
- Capt. William Linton Watson, Indian Medical Service
- Capt. Godfrey de Vere Welchman, Royal Artillery
- Maj. Cyril de Montfort Wellborne, Indian Army
- Rev. Harold William Wheeler, Royal Army Chaplains' Department
- Maj. Joseph Francis Whelan DSO Royal Army Medical Corps
- Maj. Venion Northwood Whitamore, Indian Medical Service
- Temp Capt. Talbot Hodwen Wheelwright
- Capt. William Edward Rees Williams Indian Medical Service
- Senior Nursing Sister Jeanie Stewart Ramsay Wilson RRC Queen Alexandra's Imperial Military Nursing Service Reserve
- Lt. Gerrard Napier Wilkinson, 1/39th Garhwal Rifles, Indian Army
- Temp Capt. Geoffrey Wood MC Cheshire Regiment
- Capt. Geoffrey Bradford Worsdell, Yorkshire Regiment
- Lt.-Col. Archibald Wyatt TD Hampshire Regiment
- Lt. Donald Russell Martin Yates MBE Indian Army Reserve of Officers

Australian Imperial Forces

- Lt. Michael James Hillary DSO Australian Engineers
- Maj. Samuel James White MC Australian Engineers

South African Forces

- Capt. Robert Charles Knight
- Temp Capt. Hubert Steven Wakefield

==== For valuable services rendered in connection with military operations in North Russia (Archangel Command) ====
- Capt. and Bt. Maj. Geoffrey Boutflower, Royal Army Service Corps
- Capt. Edward Philip Carter, Royal Berkshire Regiment
- Maj. Harry Llewellyn Cautley, Suffolk Regiment
- Maj. Lewis Aubrey Coker, Royal Field Artillery
- Maj. Alfred Walter Coxon, Army Pay Department
- Maj. and Bt. Lt.-Col. Richard Parry Crawley DSO MVO Royal Army Service Corps
- Capt. Walter Criswell, Royal Engineers
- Capt. George Croydon, Royal Garrison Artillery
- Maj. Christian Frederick George William de Falbe, T.F. Res
- Capt. Kingsley Dykes MC
- Capt. William Cunliffe Pickersgill Jay
- Capt. William Nicol Watson Kennedy, Royal Army Medical Corps
- Lt.-Col. Thomas McDermott, Royal Army Medical Corps
- Temp Maj. Stanley Melbourne Mohr MC Nottinghamshire and Derbyshire Regiment
- Maj. Francis Moore DSO Royal Fusiliers
- Quartermaster and Capt. John Alfred Mould
- Temp Capt. Joseph Pitts MC
- Capt. John Sanderson Poole DSO King's Royal Rifle Corps
- Temp Capt. William Carl Trorey Roeber, London Regiment
- Capt. Robert Hunter Smith, Royal Army Service Corps
- Temp Capt. George Backhouse Whitaker, Royal Engineers

Canadian Forces

- Lt. Paul Hubert Mills, Canadian Field Artillery

==== For valuable services rendered in connection with military operations in North Russia (Murmansk Command) ====
- Capt. Cecil Power Bellwood, Leicestershire Regiment
- Quartermaster and Lt. Barnard Holmes, Royal Army Medical Corps
- Temp Lt. James Wheatley Kilby, Royal Engineers
- Lt. Robert Springett MacKilligin MC Royal Engineers
- Maj. Frank Gerald Guise Moores, Royal Army Service Corps
- Temp Lt. Arthur Field Nye, Army Pay Department
- Temp Lt. Henry Albert Penn, Royal Army Ordnance Corps
- Capt. John Renwick, Royal Army Medical Corps
- Maj. Sir Ernest Henry Shackleton CVO
- Capt. Sedley Fleming Campbell Sweeny, Royal Engineers

==== In recognition of distinguished services rendered during the War ====
- Capt. Paul Adams
- Capt. Sydney Wentworth Addison, Aus. P.O
- Maj. Vaudrey Adolph Albrecht MC Manchester Regiment
- Maj. Rupert Darnley Anderson, R. Defence Cps
- Maj. John Oliver Archer, Royal Field Artillery
- Capt. William Bryan Armitage, Lancashire Fusiliers
- Capt. John Eric Arrol-Hunter
- Capt. William Ringrose Gelston Atkins
- Capt. Charles Henry Awcock, Royal Garrison Artillery
- Lt.-Col. John Eustace Arthur-Baldwin DSO 8th Hussars
- Capt. James Harvey Banks, Army Service Corps
- Maj. George Deane Bateman
- Capt. Philip Maurice Beachcroft, Royal Artillery
- Lt.-Col. William Dawson Beatty, Royal Engineers
- Maj. Victor Alexander Beaufort MC Devonshire Regiment
- Capt. Charles Hugh Bell
- Capt. Andrew Belton, Royal Fusiliers
- Capt. Harold Rothwell Bently, Cheshire Regiment
- Chaplain Rev. Robert Seymour Brendon Berry
- Maj. Percy Bishop MBE
- Capt. John Dunbar Blyth
- Lt.-Col. Carlos Bovill, Royal Artillery
- Lt.-Col. The Hon Claude Maitland Patrick Brabazon, Irish Guards
- Lt.-Col. Charles Raymond Strathern Bradley, Indian Army
- Capt. John Stanley Travers Bradley, Machine Gun Corps
- Lt.-Col. Edward Featherstone Briggs DSO
- Maj. Horace Clowes Brinsmead MC Australian Imperial Force
- Capt. Edward James Briscoe
- Maj. Reginald Vernon Charlesworth Brook
- Maj. Percival Russell Burchall
- Maj. Louis Arundell Burrowes, Middlesex Regiment
- Capt. Vincent Buxton, Leicestershire Regiment
- Lt.-Col., Charles Ferguson Campbell CIE Indian Army
- Lt.-Col. Hugh Campbell DSO Royal Fusiliers
- Capt. George Barrett Chainey
- Lt.-Col. Arthur Henry Cheatle
- Capt. Arthur James Child MC London Regiment
- Maj. Adrian John Clark, London Regiment
- Maj. Henry Cockerell
- Lt.-Col. Richard Hamilton Collier DSO
- Capt. Leonard Barnaby Cook
- Maj. Frederick Ernest Cooper
- Maj. John Walter Cordingley
- Capt. Leopold Harold Baskerville Cosway
- Lt.-Col. Ivon Terence Courtney, Royal Marine Light Infantry
- Lt.-Col. Alexander Duncan Cunningham
- Maj. Maurice Ormonde Darby
- Capt. John Hallmark Davies, Cheshire Regiment
- Capt. Martin Deacon, Royal Engineers
- Lt.-Col. Guy Cyril St. Pourgin de Dombasle, Canadian Forces
- Lt.-Col. Harry Delacombe
- Capt. Ralph Busick Claude Marie Tyrel de Poix, Norfolk Regiment
- Maj. James Dickson, SA Engineers
- Maj. John Edward Dixon Spain, Hampshire Regiment
- Maj. Gerald Dixpn-Spain MC Royal Fusiliers
- Capt. Geoffrey William Dobson, 19th Hussars
- Capt. Maurice Rowland Dobson Royal Army Medical Corps
- Maj. James Frederick Dyer, East Lancashire Regiment
- Capt. Alban Spenser Ellerton
- Maj. Audrey Thomas Evans
- Capt. William Sandford Evans, Welsh Regiment
- Capt. Reginald Marsh Everett
- Maj. George Ferdinand Hay Faithful, Indian Army
- Maj. Reuben Llewelyn Farley, Cavly. Res
- Lt.-Col. William Samuel Fetherstonhaugh, Canadian Forestry Corps
- Maj. Samuel John Vincent Fill
- Maj. Hubert Frank Fisher
- Capt. Harry Gilbert Ford
- Capt. Guy Langham Godden
- Maj. Richard Ernest Goddard
- Maj. Harry Francis Adam Gordon, York and Lancaster Regiment
- Maj. James William Gordon
- Lt.-Col. Edward Hugh Griffith, Leicestershire Regiment
- Capt. Gerald Gude
- Maj. Robert Hall MBE
- Capt. William Wellington Hall
- Col. Rev. Robert Edward Vernon Hanson Chaplain-in-Chief
- Maj. William Bowen Hargrave, Suffolk Regiment
- Capt. Edward St. Clair Harnett, Royal Highlanders
- Maj. Cuthbert Alfred Lakin Harrison
- Maj. Allan Pickup Hartley, Cheshire Regiment
- Capt. Francis Henry Hawksford
- Maj. Edward Michael William Hearn
- Lt.-Col. Sacheverell Arthur Hebden
- Capt. Francis Edgcombe Hellyer, Hampshire Regiment
- Maj. Clement Henry Armitage Hirtzel
- Maj. Archibald Henry Hogarth DCM Royal Army Medical Corps
- Maj. George Edward Woods Humphery
- Capt. Albert Hunter, West Riding Regiment
- Capt. Douglas Iron
- Capt. Dennis Cory James, Worcestershire Regiment
- Lt.-Col. Frederick Howard Jenkins MC
- Capt. John Fleming Jones DSC
- Maj. William Dallas Looey Jupp
- Capt. Michael Keegan MM Royal Dublin Fusiliers
- Lt.-Col. Frank Howard Kirlby VC DCM Royal Engineers
- Capt. William Clement Lambert, Notts Yeomanry
- Lt.-Col. Joseph Herbert Arthur Landon DSO
- Capt. Pierre Alfred Landry, Canadian Infantry
- Maj. Cecil Edward Lawder, Royal Field Artillery
- Maj. Arthur Raymond Layard
- Capt. Francis William Henry Lerwill, Royal Engineers
- Maj. Albert Levick, Grenadier Guards
- Capt. Oskar Lindquist
- Capt. Peter Douglas Liorne Lyall, Canadian Forestry Corps
- Maj. Oswyn George William Clifford Lywooi, Norfolk Regiment
- Maj. Alfred Erasmus Geoffrey Macfullum, Intell. Corps
- Capt. Kenneth Hugh McLean RNVR
- Capt. Thomae MacLeod
- Maj. Guy Montagu George, Viscount Maidstone DSC
- Capt. Reginald Baynes Mansell, Gloucestershire Regiment
- Capt. Philip Gadsby, A.O.D
- Capt. Harry Prcy Maybury
- Maj. Albert Edgar Gendle
- Capt. David Goad Herbert Arthur Michell
- Capt. Allister Mackintosh Miller DSO
- Hon Capt. Hugh Milman, Royal Engineers
- Capt. Richard Gaibraith Mitchell, Royal Scots
- Maj. Rowland Money, Royal Lancaster Regiment
- Capt. Errol Francis Monk
- Capt. Arthur Thomas Moore
- Maj. Denzil Adair Bartlett Morle
- Lt.-Col. Lewis Munro, Hampshire Regiment
- Maj. Arthur Lawrence Cecil Neame, Royal Engineers
- Capt. Christopher George Nevatt
- Maj. Hazleton Robson Nicholl
- Capt. John MacArthur Nicolle
- Capt. Sydney Nixon
- Lt. Col. Douglas Austin Oliver DSO
- Capt. Leonard Edgcombe Palmer, York and Lancaster Regiment
- Maj. Charles Herbert Parkes
- Maj. Sydney Charles Parr
- Maj. Richard Hallam Peck, East Surrey Regiment
- Lt.-Col. William Henry Pope
- Maj. Eric Walter Powell
- Asst. Conductor Lucy Marjorie Kathleen Pratt-Barlow MBE
- Capt. John Edward Haddock Pritchard
- Maj. Walter John Dakyns Pryce DCM Gordon Highlanders
- Capt. Charles Francis Rasmusen
- Maj. Geoffrey Jervis Read, North Staffordshire Regiment
- Lt.-Col. Lionel Wilmot Brabazon Rees VC MC AFC Royal Garrison Artillery
- Capt. Thomas Stanley Rippon, Royal Army Medical Corps
- Lt.-Col. Charles MacIver Robertson, Royal Field Artillery
- Maj. Hector Murdoch Maxwell Robertson MC Royal Field Artillery
- Lt.-Col. Richard Stirling Robinson
- Lt.-Col. Nelson Roche
- Maj. James Theodore Rodwell
- Capt. Samuel Greenlees Rome MC Argyll and Sutherland Highlanders
- Capt. Andrew Alexander Ross
- Lt.-Col. Alexander Ross-Hume, Scottish Rifles
- Maj. The Hon Victor Alexander Frederick Villiers Russell, Bedfordshire Regiment
- Maj. Felix Rumney Samson
- Capt. Ernest Selby
- Maj. John Percy Claude Sewell
- Capt. Harry Turner Shaw
- Maj. Arthur Frederick Sidgreaves
- Maj. George Edward Smith, East Yorkshire Regiment
- Capt. James Drummond Smith
- Maj. Sydney William Smith, Royal Artillery
- Capt. William Edwin Smith
- Capt. Geoffrey Somers-Clarke
- Capt. Douglas Charles Leyland Speed, King's Royal Rifle Corps
- Capt. Frank Steel, Essex Regiment
- Maj. John Valentine Steel, Royal Engineers
- Capt. Frank Douglas Stevens, Machine Gun Corps
- Capt. George Stevens
- Capt. Jack Stewart, Royal Scots Fusiliers
- Capt. Alfred Hugh Stradling, Gordon Highlanders
- Lt.-Col. Lawrence Hugh Strain DSC
- Capt. Howard Wallace Stratton, 6th Dragoon Guards
- Capt. Lionel Michael Patrick Sulivan, Royal Engineers
- Maj. George Henry Thomson
- Lt.-Col. George Eardley Todd, Welsh Regiment
- Maj. Henry Carmichael Tweedie DSO North Staffordshire Regiment
- Maj. Frederick Henry Unwin
- Lt.-Col. Reynell Henry Verney
- Capt. William James Waddingixm, Grenadier Guards
- Capt. William Wade, Middlesex Regiment
- Capt. Howard Napier Walker MC Welsh Regiment
- Lt.-Col. Alexander Thomas Watson, Nigeria Regiment
- Maj. George William Williamson MC Manchester Regiment
- Capt. Henry Alexander James Wilson
- Maj. Aubrey Brooke Winch, Royal Scots Greys
- Capt. Cuthbert Walter Wise MC Army Service Corps
- Maj. Thomas Worswick
- Capt. Hugh Edmund Fowler Wynooll MC Nottinghamshire and Derbyshire Regiment
- Maj. Henry Irving Frederick Yates MC
- Capt. Charles Fredsall Yeomans
- Capt. Andrew Young

==== In recognition of valuable services rendered in connection with the War ====
- Maj. Harold Blumfield Brown, Royal Garrison Artillery (TF)

==== In recognition of services in connection with the War ====
Royal Navy

- Acting Chaplain the Rev. Bernard James Failes
- Chaplain the Rev. Francis Horace Jones
- Acting Chaplain the Rev. Henry Swing Kendall
- Acting Chaplain the Rev. Norman Braund Kent
- Chaplain the Rev. Walter Kenrick Knight-Adkin
- Acting Chaplain the Rev. Horace Ricardo Wilkinson

Army

- Temp Lt. Charles Anthony Ablett, Royal Engineers
- Capt. Adolphe Abrahams, Royal Army Medical Corps
- Maj. Thomas George Acres
- Temp Capt. John Cadwallader Adams
- Lt.-Col. Joseph Saunders Addenbrooke, Royal Engineers
- Maj. Michael David Ahern, Royal Army Medical Corps
- Maj. Denis Aherne, Royal Horse Artillery
- Maj. Arthur Charles Bridgeman Alexander, late Seaforth Highlanders
- Maj. Edward Watts Allen, Royal Army Service Corps
- Maj. and Bt. Lt.-Col. Atwell Hayes Allen, Royal Army Ordnance Corps
- Capt. John Stirling Alston, King's Royal Rifle Corps
- Lt.-Col. William Albert Alwood, Royal Army Ordnance Corps
- Capt. Cecil Henry Anderson-Pelham, Rem. Services
- Temp Maj. John Samuel Anderson, Army Pay Department
- Maj. Frederick William Aridrewes FRCS Royal Army Medical Corps
- Maj. George Crossley Appleyard, Royal Artillery
- Capt. and Bt. Maj. Malcolm Alexander Arbuthnot, Seaforth Highlanders
- Rev. Mervyn Archdale, Royal Army Chaplains' Department
- Maj. Samuel Frank Alderson Archer, Royal Artillery
- Capt. and Bt. Maj. Charles Leathley Armitage DSO Worcestershire Regiment
- Maj. James Alexander Armstrong, Royal Inniskilling Fusiliers
- Capt. Edward Whinstone Arnott, Royal Field Artillery
- Temp Lt.-Col. Herbert George Ashwell, Royal Army Medical Corps
- Lt.-Col. Hugh Harry Haworth Aspinall, Indian Army
- Temp Maj. Charles Atherton Atchley, Royal Engineers
- Lt.-Col. George Bramall Atherton, Royal Army Service Corps
- Maj. Edward William Atkinson DSO Royal Inniskilling Fusiliers
- Temp Maj. Anthony William Maunsell Atthill MVO Royal Army Service Corps
- Capt. Samuel James Manson Auld MC Royal Berkshire Regiment
- Lt.-Col. Bill Auld, Labour Corps
- Maj. and Bt. Lt.-Col. George Henry Badcock, Rem. Service, late Indian Army
- Temp Maj. Arthur Henry Bagnall
- Lt. Richard Dayrell Banall
- Temp Maj. Arthur Charles Bailey, Royal Engineers
- Maj. Percy James Bailey DSO 12th Lancers
- Maj. Frederick Guy Stirling Baker, Essex Regiment
- Lt.-Col. William Henry Baker-Baker, Northumberland Volunteer Corps
- Maj. Henry Barchard Fenwick Baker-Carr, Argyll and Sutherland Highlanders
- Maj. Edward William Sturgis Balfour DSO MC 5th Dragoon Guards
- Lt. Hon James Moncrieff Balfour, Scottish Horse Yeomanry
- Capt. Alexander Douglas Ball
- Temp Capt. Walter Craven Ball, Royal Engineers
- Maj. David Ballantyne, Royal Scots
- Lt.-Col. Percy Bamford TD Manchester Regiment
- Temp Lt. Col. Gilbert Alexander Bannatyne FRCP Royal Army Medical Corps
- Lt.-Col. Thomas Foster Barham, Somerset Volunteer Corps
- Temp Capt. Hon Hugo Baring
- Maj. Charles Robert Barkshire, Staff for Royal Engineers Service
- Temp Capt. and Bt. Maj. Neil MacKechnie Barren, Royal Engineers
- Hon Lt.-Col. William Barker Bartholomew, Staff for Royal Engineers Service
- Rev. Reginald Bartlett, Royal Army Chaplains' Department
- Quartermaster and Maj. William Bass
- Maj. Francis Marshall Bassett, Bedfordshire Regiment
- Maj. John Retallack Bassett DSO Royal Berkshire Regiment
- Lt.-Col. William Edmund Pollexfen Bastard, Royal Engineers
- Temp Capt. George William Hyde Batho, late Royal Garrison Artillery
- Lt.-Col. Herbert Cary George Batten, City of Bristol Volunteer Corps
- Maj. Abington Robert Bayley, Royal Field Artillery
- Maj. and Bt. Lt.-Col. Douglas Dyneley Baynes, Labour Corps
- Maj. William Lear Beales, Royal Inniskilling Fusiliers
- Temp Capt. William Robert de la Cour Beamish, Royal Engineers
- Temp Maj. Myddelton Beasley, Royal Engineers
- Temp Maj. Eugene Guy Euston Beaumont, Royal Army Service Corps
- Capt. and Bt. Maj. Claude Eagles Willoughby Beddoes, Gloucestershire Regiment
- Maj. and Hon Lt.-Col. Henry Howard Bedingfield, late Devonshire Regiment
- Lt.-Col. Henry Begbey, Royal Army Ordnance Corps
- Temp Capt. Edgar Charles Behrens, Royal Army Service Corps
- Temp Maj. Charles Francis Bell DSO Royal Army Service Corps
- Maj. Clive Vincent Moberley Bell, North Lancashire Regiment
- Temp Maj. George Gerald Bell, Royal Engineers
- Lt.-Col. Andrew Bell-Irving DSO late Royal Artillery
- Temp Maj. James Bennett, Royal Army Service Corps
- Maj. Joseph Benskin DSO Royal Engineers
- Maj. and Bt. Lt.-Col. Ralph Hawtrey Rohde Benson, Royal Artillery
- Lt.-Col. Robert Marr Benzie TD Scottish Rifles
- Maj. John dela Poer Beresford, Royal Berkshire Regiment
- Temp Capt. Peter Bergheim MC Royal Garrison Artillery
- Maj. Rupert Edric Gifford Berkeley, Indian Army
- Maj. and Bt. Lt.-Col. John Bernard, Royal Army Service Corps
- Rev. Stewart Frederick Lewis Bernays, Royal Army Chaplains' Department
- Maj. John Borrow, 19th Hussars
- Lt.-Col. Henry Arthur Berryman, Royal Army Medical Corps
- Maj. and Bt. Lt.-Col. Charles Peter Berthon, East Yorkshire Regiment
- Capt. Alfred Best DCM Lancashire Fusiliers
- Lt. Samuel Beverley, Royal Artillery
- Maj. and Bt. Lt.-Col. Charles William Biggs, Royal Engineers
- Capt. William John How Bilderbeck, Army Pay Department
- Lt.-Col. Sir Albert Edward Bingham Bt Royal Engineers
- Lt.-Col. Steuart Murrey Binny, Army Pay Department
- Maj. Lawrence Wilfred Bird DSO Royal Berkshire Regiment
- Maj. Philip Austen Birkin, T.F. Res
- Lt.-Col. Arthur Watson Birt, West Yorkshire Regiment
- Temp Capt. Charles Alder Bishop, Royal Army Service Corps
- Lt.-Col. Joseph George Bishop, Monmouthshire Regiment
- Capt. Nathaniel Bishop
- Maj. N. Black, Sing. Volunteer Corps
- Capt. Thomas Blackburn, King's Own Scottish Borderers
- Capt. Hew Francis Blair-Imrie CMG Royal Hussars
- Temp Maj. Eustace William Blois, Rem. Service
- Temp Maj. Wilmot Blomefield, Royal Engineers
- Lt. Cuthbert Leigh Blundell-Hollinshead-Blundell, Grenadier Guards
- Maj. and Bt. Lt.-Col. Kenneth Martin Body CMG Royal Army Ordnance Corps
- Maj. and Bt. Lt.-Col. Robert Alfred Bolam Royal Army Medical Corps
- Quartermaster and Lt.-Col. Frank Bourne
- Lt.-Col. Mansell Bowers, 5th Dragoon Guards
- Temp Capt. Charles Bower Ismay
- Lt.-Col. Ludlow Tonson Bowles, Royal Jersey Militia
- Maj. Edward Langley Bowring DSO Worcestershire Regiment
- Maj. Arthur Octavian Boyd, Royal Artillery
- Temp Lt. Frederick Henry Ewart Branson MBE Royal Army Service Corps
- Rev. Albert Edward Bray, Royal Army Chaplains' Department
- Temp Maj. Richard Harding Bremridge Royal Army Medical Corps
- Capt. Arthur Brodie Hamilton Bridges, Royal Army Medical Corps
- Lt.-Col. Edward James Bridges, Staff for Royal Engineers Service
- Temp Capt. and Bt. Maj. James Leslie Brierly
- Maj. and Bt. Col. George Ewbank Briggs, late Royal Fusiliers
- Temp Capt. Charles John Brightman, Royal Army Service Corps
- Lt. John Henry Brightman, London Regiment
- Maj. Rowland Brinckman, Royal Irish Fusiliers
- Temp Lt.-Col. Reginald Brittan DSO Nottinghamshire and Derbyshire Regiment
- Temp Maj. William Albert Britten, Army Pay Department
- Rev. John Brodie Brosman, Royal Army Chaplains' Department
- Col. Arthur Rudston Brown MBE
- Capt. Robert Cunyngham Brown, Royal Army Medical Corps
- Temp Maj. Tom Bousquet Browne Royal Army Service Corps
- Maj. George Robert Bruce, Royal Army Medical Corps
- Lt. George Herbert Buchannan, South Wales Borderers
- Lt.-Col. Michael Rowland Gray Buchanan, Scottish Rifles
- Lt.-Col. Sidney Carr Hobart-Hampden-Mercer-Henderson, Earl of Buckinghamshire, Oxfordshire and Buckinghamshire Light Infantry
- Maj. Edward Buncombe Henry Buckley, Royal Garrison Artillery
- Capt. and Temp Maj. Henry Stephen Guy Buckmaster, Oxfordshire and Buckinghamshire Light Infantry
- Temp Maj. Lewis William Buffham, Royal Army Ordnance Corps
- Temp Maj. Edward Griffiths George Burdon
- Maj. Denis Joseph Gerard Burke, Duke of Cornwall's Light Infantry
- Hon Lt.-Col. Montague Berthon Burnand, 3rd Suffolk Regiment
- Capt. Richard Frank Burnand, Northumberland Fusiliers
- Maj. and Bt. Lt.-Col. Frank Henry Burnell-Nugent DSO Rifle Brigade
- Maj. Alexander Edwin Burnett, King's Own Scottish Borderers
- Maj. John Chaplyn Burnett DSO
- Maj. Leslie Trew Burnett, London Regiment
- Maj. Harry William Geddes Burnett-Hitchcock, Royal Fusiliers
- Capt. Charles William Wilberforce Burrell, Essex Regiment
- Temp Maj. Edmund Gerald Burton, Royal Army Service Corps
- Henrietta Burton RRC Matron, Queen Alexandra's Imperial Military Nursing Service Reserve
- Capt. and Bt. Maj. Herbert Edgar Burton, Royal Engineers
- Temp Maj. James Robert Bury-Barry
- Maj. William Byam, Royal Army Medical Corps
- Quartermaster and Capt. Richard Byrne MC Royal Dublin Fusiliers
- Rev. John Cairns, Royal Army Chaplains' Department
- Lt. Arthur Campbell, Army Gymnastic Staff
- Lt.-Col. Charles Campbell, 6th Cav., Indian Army
- Maj. Arthur Edward Joseph Noel, Viscount Campden, Gloucestershire Regiment
- Maj. Edward David Carden, Royal Engineers
- Maj. Francis Gordon Cardew, Indian Army (ret.)
- Lt.-Col. Thomas Carlyle, late Royal Army Ordnance Corps
- Maj. Charles Cattley Carr DSO
- Temp Capt. William Tom Carter, South Staffordshire Regiment
- Temp Maj. Robert Jardine Carruthers, Royal Engineers
- Temp Maj. Richard Bernard Cartwright, Army Pay Department
- Maj. Louis Cassel
- Temp Maj. Edward Postle Gwyn Causton, Royal Army Medical Corps
- Temp Maj. Oswald Challis, Royal Army Medical Corps
- Lt.-Col. Ernest Washington Chance, Bedfordshire Regiment
- Maj. Maurice Chance, Bedfordshire Regiment
- Temp Capt. Cecil John Golding Chandler, Royal Army Ordnance Corps
- Maj. George James Chapman, Royal Engineers
- Maj. Joseph Thomas Chapman, Royal Artillery
- Lt.-Col. T. H. ChapmanVD Ceylon Engineers
- Lt.-Col. Frank Martin Chatterley TD Royal Warwickshire Regiment
- Maj. Thomas John Cheilew, Royal Garrison Artillery
- Capt. Dennis Chesney, Worcestershire Regiment
- Lt.-Col. Walter Raleigh Chichester, Worcestershire Regiment
- Temp Capt. John Percy Chirnside CMG Rem. Service
- Temp Lt.-Col. James Christie, Scottish Rifles
- Capt. Harry Emory Chubb, Royal Army Service Corps
- Maj. John Reginald Lopes Yarde-Buller, Lord Churston MVO Scots Guards
- Col. Robert Clark VD
- Maj. Emilius Clayton, Royal Artillery
- Capt. and Bt. Maj. Lionel Alfred Clemens MC South Lancashire Regiment
- Maj. Harry Clive, North Staffordshire Regiment
- Capt. Ernest Hamilton Clifton
- Maj. Henry Kenny Clough, Royal Lancaster Regiment
- Quartermaster and Capt. Thomas Coates MBE Extra. Reg. Empld
- Temp Maj. Walter George Cockburn, Royal Army Ordnance Corps
- Lt.-Col. Thomas Henry Cochrane MVO Royal Engineers
- Temp Capt. William Percy Cochrane MBE
- Maj. and Bt. Lt.-Col. Herbert Adolphe Coddington DSO late Royal Irish Fusiliers
- Lt.-Col. Thomas Everit Coleman, Staff for Royal Engineers Service
- Maj. Sir Herbert Benjamin Cohen Bt Royal West Kent Regiment
- Maj. Reginald Charles Coldwell, Northamptonshire Regiment
- Lt.-Col. John Albert Cole, Lincolnshire Regiment
- Maj. Mortimer Calmady Collier VD Royal Army Service Corps
- Temp Capt. Bertram James Collingwood, Royal Army Medical Corps
- Maj. Charles Howell Groset Collins, Duke of Cornwall's Light Infantry
- Rev. Edward Hycynth Collins, Royal Army Chaplains' Department
- Temp Lt. Arthur Hugh Colquhoun, Royal Army Ordnance Corps
- Lt.-Col. Charles Eliezer Colville VD Royal Highlanders
- Lt.-Col. Arthur Allen Collyer, Army Pay Department
- Temp Maj. James Scarth Combe
- Temp Maj. George Henry Edward Condon, Royal Engineers
- Maj. Alfred Evelyn Coningham MC Royal Engineers
- Maj. Sidney George Cook, Huntingdonshire Cyclist Battalion
- Maj. Martin Alfred Cooke, Royal Army Medical Corps
- Lt.-Col. Philip Blencowe Cookson CMG Northumberland Hussars
- Lt. Eustace Nugent-Fitzgeorge de Radcliffe Cooper MC Royal Field Artillery
- Temp Capt. George Alexander Conacher Cooper, Royal Engineers
- Hon Maj. Harry Cooper, Royal Army Ordnance Corps
- Lt.-Col. Martin Percy Corkery, Royal Army Medical Corps
- Maj. Evan James Trevor Cory, Royal Army Medical Corps
- Temp Capt. Sidney Herbert Court, Royal Engineers
- Maj. John Cowan, Royal Engineers
- Capt. John Cowling, London Regiment
- Maj. Lionel Hired Cowper, Royal Lancaster Regiment
- Lt. Horace Beresford Cox, Royal Garrison Artillery
- Lt.-Col. Thomas Langhorne Coxhead DSO Royal Garrison Artillery
- Capt. John Edward Crabbie, Royal Highlanders
- Capt. Peter McLellan Cran, Royal Engineers (Special Reserve)
- Temp Capt. Lucius Fairohild Crane
- Maj. Robert Eugene Cran, North Lancashire Regiment (Special Reserve)
- Lt. Albert Kenneth Graves Crater, East Surrey Regiment (Special Reserve)
- Temp Lt.-Col. John Craven, South Lancashire Regiment
- Maj. Charles Crawley, Royal Army Medical Corps
- Lt.-Col. Edward Cottingliain Creagh, 57th Rifles, Indian Army
- Maj. John Critchlow, Royal Engineers
- Lt.-Col. Arthur Albert Crocker, Essex Regiment
- Capt. Tom Croft
- Lt.-Col. Cecil Crosskey VD Royal Army Service Corps
- Lt. Eric Crossley, 11th Hussars
- Maj. Percy Hamilton Cruickshank, Royal Artillery
- Capt. Eldon Annesley Crump, South Staffordshire Regiment
- Maj. Cleland Bulstrode Cumberlege DSO Bedfordshire Regiment
- Maj. Ernest Nicholson Cunliffe Royal Army Medical Corps
- Lt.-Col. Frederick George Cunningham, East Yorkshire Regiment
- Maj. Lewis Narborough Hughes D'Aeth, Staff
- Temp Lt. Wilfred Gordon Beale Dailley, Royal Army Ordnance Corps
- Maj. Claude Hecnry Dale, Royal Warwickshire Regiment
- Temp Maj. Walter Daniel, Royal Engineers
- Capt. Humphrey Averell Daniel, London Regiment
- Lt.-Col. Edward Mashiter Dansey, late Life Guards
- Maj. Henry Read Darley DSO Dragoon Guards
- Maj. and Bt. Lt.-Col. George Bruce Dartnell, Royal Army Service Corps
- Maj. Claude Daubuz MC Royal Field Artillery
- Maj. Edward Owen Davies, London Regiment
- Capt. Bryant Fitzwilliam Richard Davis, Gloucestershire Regiment
- Lt.-Col. Cecil Davis
- 2nd Lt. Sidney Alfred Davis DSO
- Temp Lt. Col. William Richard Dawson, Royal Army Medical Corps
- Quartermaster and Lt. William Herbert Davnes
- Maj. Arthur Cecil Hamilton Dean DSO
- Quartermaster and Capt. Waiter Nathan Dearnley, 1st Life Guards
- Temp Maj. Frank Debenham, Oxfordshire and Buckinghamshire Light Infantry
- Maj. Harold Alfred Denham, Liverpool Regiment
- Temp Capt. John Dewar Denniston
- Maj. William Alfred Charles Denny, Royal Army Service Corps
- Temp Lt.-Col. Lewis Adolphus De Vic Carey
- Temp Maj. James Devine, Royal Engineers
- Temp Maj. James Arthur Devine DSO Royal Army Medical Corps
- Lt.-Col. Henry des Voeux, Labour Corps
- Lt. Michael Bruce Urquhart Dewar, Royal Engineers
- Capt. Ferdinand De Witt, Royal Artillery
- Maj. Sidhey Herbert Dewing, Norfolk Regiment
- Quartermaster and Maj. Joseph Espin Dickinson, Royal Jersey Militia
- Capt. Robert Milne Dickson Royal Army Medical Corps
- Capt. William Dickson, Royal Army Ordnance Corps
- Temp Maj. Thomas Melville Dill, Bermuda Militia Artillery and Royal Garrison Artillery
- Lt.-Col. Henry Peers Dimmock, Indian Medical Service
- Temp Maj. Edward Dixon, Travers, Royal Artillery
- Capt. and Bt. Maj. Andrew Edward Augustus Dobson, Royal Artillery
- Temp Capt. George Shannon Dockrell
- Temp Capt. Francis Sandford Dod, Royal Army Service Corps
- Temp Maj. Herbert Frederick Doidge, Royal Army Service Corps
- Maj. Claude Prendergast Doig DSO Seaforth Highlanders
- Lt.-Col. George Frederick Doland
- Maj. and Bt. Lt.-Col. William Dundas Dooner CMG Royal Army Ordnance Corps
- Temp Capt. Percy William Dove Royal Army Medical Corps
- Maj. Halkett Walton Money Down, Army Pay Department
- Lt.-Col. Henry John Downing DSO late Royal Irish Rifles
- Lt.-Col. John Summers Drew, Middlesex Regiment
- Maj. Tom Maxwell Drew, Leicestershire Regiment
- Capt. Reginald Samuel Orme Dudfield, Royal Army Medical Corps
- Temp Capt. Harold Ward Dudley, Royal Engineers
- Temp Capt. Michael Louis Duffy, Royal Engineers
- Maj. George Philip Du Plat Taylor, Grenadier Guards
- Capt. Robert Charles Dunn, Lancashire Fusiliers
- Quartermaster and Lt.-Col. John Samuel Dyke MVO late Royal West Surrey Regiment
- Maj. Hugh Eardley-Wilmot, Devonshire Regiment
- Temp Capt. Percy Eardiey-Wilmot
- Temp Maj. Lewis Thomas Jerome Earp, Royal Army Ordnance Corps
- Capt. B. J. Eaton, Malayan Volunteer Infantry
- Maj. Lionel Charles Edwards, Royal Garrison Artillery
- Maj. Albert Ebsmann, Royal Army Medical Corps
- Temp Capt. Ernest Alfred Elgee
- Maj. Stanley Elliott, London Regiment
- Maj. RichardStanley Ellis MC Royal Artillery
- Capt. and Bt. Maj. Reginald Cheyne Elmslie FRCS Royal Army Medical Corps
- Lt.-Col. Herbert Averill Elton, Staffor Royal Engineers
- Capt. William Rowe Eiworthy, Special Reserve
- Capt. Ernest Arnold Emmet
- Maj. and Bt. Lt.-Col. Evelyn Linzee Engleheart, late Royal Welsh Fusiliers
- Hon Maj. Richard Travell England
- Maj. William English, Royal Army Service Corps
- Rev. Alexander Dallas Lecky Ennis, Royal Army Chaplains' Department
- Dora Longair Esslemont, Queen Mary's Army Auxiliary Corps
- Capt. Arthur Henry Evans, Royal Army Medical Corps
- Capt. Cecil Hugh Silvester Evans, Royal Engineers
- Isabella Mercer Ewing, Controller, Queen Mary's Army Auxiliary Corps
- Temp Lt.-Col. James Ezechiel, late Indian Army
- Capt. Charles Horace John Fagan, Royal Artillery
- Maj. David Alexander Fairbairn, West Riding Regiment
- Temp Capt. James Ross Fairbairn, Durham Light Infantry
- Lt.-Col. Henry George Falkner, Royal Army Medical Corps
- Capt. Gilbert Valentine Fanell, 99th Infantry Indian Army
- Temp Capt. Edward George Duncan Fawoett, Royal Army Ordnance Corps
- Maj. Edmund Fearenside DSO Manchester Regiment
- Maj. Charles Grincill Fellowes, Royal Artillery
- Temp Maj. Donald Ferguson, Seaforth Highlanders
- Maj. Spencer Charles Ferguson, Northumberland Fusiliers
- Capt. Christopher Senior Field, Worcestershire Regiment, att. Nigeria Regiment, West African Frontier Force
- Temp Maj. Vernon Shaw Taylor Fincken MC
- Lt.-Col. Richard John Findlay, Royal Army Ordnance Corps
- Temp Maj. William Thomas Finlayson, Royal Army Medical Corps
- Capt. Colin Fish, Staff for Royal Engineers Service
- Maj. Vernon Frederick Fitch, Royal Field Artillery
- Maj. Gordon William Fitzgerald, Royal Army Medical Corps
- Maj. William Coulson Fitzgerald, late Royal Irish Fusiliers
- Capt. and Bt. Maj. James Archibald St. George Fitzwarenne-Despencer-Robertson, Royal Welsh Fusiliers
- Maj. Henry Slane Fleming
- Lt.-Col. Henry Rivers Fletcher, Norfolk Regiment
- Temp Maj. Edwin Howard Flew, Army Pay Corps
- Lt. William Henry Flinn, Royal Irish Rifles
- Quartermaster and Capt. Herbert George Henry Fogg MC Royal Army Service Corps
- Lt. Philip Edward Broadley Fooks, Royal Garrison Artillery
- Temp Maj. Robert Foran, Army Pay Corps
- Maj. George Newton Ford, London Regiment
- Capt. John Theodore Ford, Hampshire Regiment
- Temp Maj. Cornelius William Foreman, Royal Army Service Corps
- Temp Capt. Hugh Carlton Formby
- Lt.-Col. John Formby, Lancashire Volunteer Corps
- Capt. and Bt. Maj. Charles Matthew Forster, Royal Engineers
- Capt. Widenham Francis Widenham Fosbery CMG Royal Defence Corps
- Capt. and Bt. Maj. Alexander Grant Russell Foulerton, Royal Army Medical Corps
- Maj. and Bt. Lt.-Col. George Curran Orr Fowler, Royal Army Veterinary Corps
- Maj. Robert Michael Douglas Fox, Yorkshire Light Infantry
- Temp Maj. George Warren Frazer, Royal Army Service Corps
- Temp Capt. Harry Branston Freer, Royal Army Service Corps
- Capt. and Bt. Maj. Colin Charlwood Frye, Royal Army Medical Corps
- Maj. Cecil Robert Fryer, Suffolk Regiment
- Lt.-Col. Arthur Fuller-Acland-Hood, Cheshire Regiment
- Capt. Charles John Dickenson Gair, Royal Army Medical Corps
- Temp Capt. Sidney Galtrey
- Maj. James Muir Galloway, Royal Field Artillery
- Capt. FitzRoy Gardner
- Lt.-Col. Frederick Charles Garrett, Northern Cyclist Battalion
- Maj. Lawrence Challoner Garratt, Coldstream Guards
- Maj. William Alexander Stuart Gemmell DSO Royal Artillery
- Dorothy Gervers, Controller, Queen Mary's Army Auxiliary Corps
- Lt.-Col. William Naunton Roger Gilbert-Cooper, East Surrey Regiment
- Maj. Godfrey Douglas Giles, Royal Field Artillery
- Capt. Arthur Herbert Giles, Gloucestershire Regiment, attd. Nigeria Regiment
- Temp Capt. James Herbert Wainwright Gill, Royal Engineers
- Maj. Vincent Andrew Gillam, York and Lancaster Regiment
- Capt. James Adam Kirkwood Gillies, Royal Defence Corps
- Lt.-Col. Henry Thomas Gilling TD Royal Field Artillery
- Temp Capt. Conrad Theodore Gimingham, Royal Engineers
- Quartermaster and Lt.-Col. Andrew Fitzwilliam Gleeson, Royal Army Service Corps
- Capt. James Alison Glover Royal Army Medical Corps
- Temp Capt. Montague Gluckstein, Royal Engineers
- Lt.-Col. Alfred Davis Godley, Oxfordshire Volunteer Corps
- Maj. Frank Goldsmith, Suffolk Yeomanry
- Capt. Frederick Lucien Golla Royal Army Medical Corps
- Lt.-Col. Edward Wilberforce Goodall Royal Army Medical Corps
- Capt. and Bt. Maj. Robert Blunde Goodden, Welsh Regiment
- Temp Capt. Aubrey Goodwin, Royal Army Medical Corps
- Maj. Edward Ian Drumearn Gordon, Royal Scots Fusiliers
- Capt. George Gordon, Argyll and Sutherland Highlanders
- Lt. William Cyril Gover, Royal Garrison Artillery
- Maj. William Francis Newby Grant, Northamptonshire Regiment
- Maj. William Griffith Grant, late Lincolnshire Regiment
- Maj. Alexander Charles Edward Gray Royal Army Medical Corps
- Rev. Earnest William Green, Royal Army Chaplains' Department
- Temp Hon Capt. James Gregg, Royal Army Veterinary Corps
- Maj. Lancelot Mare Gregson, Grenadier Guards
- Temp Lt. Robert Holmes Arbuthnot Gresson MBE
- Capt. Gronwy Robert Griffith, Royal Welsh Fusiliers
- Lt.-Col. Charles Griffiths, Rem. Service, late Indian Army
- Temp Capt. Noel Marshall Griffiths, Royal Army Service Corps
- Rev. Trevor Griffiths, Royal Army Chaplains' Department
- Lt. Thomas Reginald Grigson, Royal Engineers
- Lt. William Edwin Grimshaw, Royal Artillery
- Lt.-Col. John Ellis Griss, Royal Engineers
- Temp Quartermaster and Maj. John James Grubb MBE Royal West Surrey Regiment
- Capt. Martin Nepean Traill Gubbins Royal Artillery
- Hon Lt.-Col. Robert Lindsay Guthrie, late 1st Lanarcshire Volunteer Regiment
- Capt. and Bt. Maj. Robert Lyall Guthrie Royal Army Medical Corps
- Quartermaster and Maj. George Gyngell, Dorsetshire Regiment
- Quartermaster and Maj. Patrick Hackett, Hampshire Regiment
- Capt. Arthur Hacking
- Maj. Edward Dashwood Haggitt, Royal Engineers
- Lt. Walter Churchill Hale MC Royal Field Artillery
- Rev. James Tooke Hales, Royal Army Chaplains' Department
- Lt.-Col. Michael Francis Halford, York and Lancaster Regiment
- Lt.-Col. Alexander Nelson Hall, Oxfordshire Yeomanry
- Quartermaster and Maj. Douglas Hall
- Maj. George Leslie Hall, Royal Engineers
- Rev. Richard Hall, Royal Army Chaplains' Department
- Temp Lt. Harry Mainwaring Hallsworth, Royal Engineers
- Lt. Herbert Adolph Hambleton, Royal Field Artillery
- Capt. Ronald James Hamilton
- Maj. Richard James Hamlin, Royal Army Ordnance Corps
- Capt. Harry Williams Hamlett, Royal Field Artillery
- Maj. Everard Ernest Hanbury, Scots Guards
- Maj. Eric Thomas Henry Hanbury Tracy, Coldstream Guards
- Temp Maj. William Hubert Alers Hankey
- Temp Maj. Charles Graham Hannay, Royal Army Service Corps
- Rev. Robert Edward Vemon Hanson, Royal Army Chaplains' Department
- Capt. Cecil Redfern Harding, Irish Guards
- Temp Maj. Confred Napier Mitchell Hardy, Army Pay Department
- Quartermaster and Maj. George Henry Harlow, Royal Army Service Corps
- Lt.-Col. Charles Sydney Harris, Army Pay Department
- Temp Maj. Emanuel Vincent Harris, Royal Engineers
- Maj. George Arthur Harris DSO
- Quartermaster and Maj. Walter Reginald Harris, Royal West Surrey Regiment
- Lt. John Stubbs Harrison, Royal Field Artillery
- Capt. Ernest James Hart, Northumberland Fusiliers
- Capt. Kenneth Eugene Hart MC Royal West Surrey Regiment
- Temp Lt.-Col. Ernest William Hart-Cox, Army Pay Department
- Capt. Ronald Victor Okes Hart-Synot DSO Royal Guernsey Militia
- Capt. Frank Barrington Harvey, Worcestershire Regiment
- Maj. Henry Wilfred Haughton DSO Buckinghamshire Yeomanry
- Temp Maj. John Alfred Hawkes, Royal Engineers
- Temp Maj. Henry Hawkins
- Lt.-Col. Frederick Haworth VD Cumberland and Westmorland Volunteer Corps
- Lt.-Col. Frederick Arthur Hayden DSO West Riding Regiment
- Surgeon-Capt. George Sullivan Clifford Hayes, 1st Life Guards
- Lt. Arthur William Ainley Headley, Royal Engineers
- Maj. Samuel Ferguson Heard, Army Pay Department
- Lt.-Col. Michael Leo Hearn, Royal Army Medical Corps
- Temp Capt. Thomas George Heatley, Royal Army Veterinary Corps
- Capt. Rowland Philip Arthur Helps MC Lancashire Fusiliers
- Lt.-Col. Coote Robert Hely-Hutchison, Royal Fusiliers
- Maj. John Acheson Henderson DSO 8th Hussars
- Lt.-Col. Hon George Edward Heneage, Lincolnshire Regiment
- Lt.-Col. Sir Reginald Hennell Kt CVO DSO Middlesex Regiment
- Temp Lt.-Col. Alfred Stanley Henry, Scottish Rifles
- Lt.-Col. Ernest Roland Herbert, Huntingdonshire Cyclist Battalion
- Capt. Arthur Cecily Herne, South Lancashire Regiment
- Maj. George James Herridge, Royal Army Service Corps
- Capt. Gerald Charles Irwin Hervey, Leicestershire Regiment
- Maj. Edward Vincent Osborne Hewett CMG DSO Royal West Kent Regiment
- Temp Maj. John Theodore Hewitt
- Temp Lt. Noel Heywood, Royal Army Service Corps
- Capt. John Esmond Longuet Higgins MC London Regiment
- Hon Lt.-Col. Joseph Walker Higgs-Walker
- Maj. Frederick George Antrim Hill, Royal Garrison Artillery
- Maj. and Bt. Lt.-Col. Frank William Rowland Hill CMG DSO Royal Army Ordnance Corps
- Temp Maj. Trevor Montague Hill, 2nd Dragoon Guards
- Capt. John William Hillyard, Royal Berkshire Regiment
- Temp Capt. R. S. Hilton
- Temp Hon Maj. Thomas Guy Macaulay Hine, Royal Army Medical Corps
- Temp Capt. Alfred Joseph Hingston, Royal Engineers
- Maj. Herbert Hoare, 5th Dragoon Guards
- Capt. Hodgkinson, Robert Frank Byron, Nottinghamshire and Derbyshire Regiment
- Lt.-Col. Thomas White Holdich TD East Yorkshire Regiment
- Temp Maj. John Joseph Holdsworth, Army Pay Department
- Lt. Charles-Frederick Holford DSO Royal Horse Artillery
- Temp Maj. Wilfred Holland
- Temp Maj. William Edward Home, Royal Army Medical Corps
- Maj. Grosvenor Arthur Alex Hood, Viscount Hood, Grenadier Guards
- Temp Maj. and Lt.-Col. Vernon Vavasour Hooley, Royal Army Service Corps
- Temp Capt. Herbert Ross Hooper, Royal Engineers
- Temp Maj. and Lt.-Col. Sir John Augustus Hope Bt labour Corps
- Maj. Percy Alfred Hopkins, Worcestershire Regiment
- Capt. and Bt. Maj. Robert Victor Galbraith Horn DSO MC Royal Scots Fusiliers
- Temp Capt. Wilfred Allen Howells, Royal Welsh Fusiliers
- Lt. Edward Jonas Hoyle, Royal Engineers
- Lt.-Col. Emanuel Hoyle, Royal Army Service Corps
- Capt. Reginald Guy Hue-Williams, East Surrey Regiment
- Maj. Claud Allard Erskine Hughes, Cheshire Regiment
- Capt. Ernest Cranmer Hughes FRCS Royal Army Medical Corps
- Capt. Gordon Stewart Hughman, Middlesex Regiment
- Temp Capt. Bernard Humphrey
- Hon Capt. Percy Harry Illingworth Humphreys
- Lt.-Col. William Humphreys VD Lancashire Fusiliers
- Maj. Thomas Edward Carew Hunt DSO Royal Berkshire Regiment
- Lt. Evan Austin Hunter, Royal Army Service Corps
- Temp Maj. Herbert Patrick Hunter, Royal Garrison Artillery
- Lt.-Col. Maurice Hunter TD Nottinghamshire and Derbyshire Regiment
- Temp Maj. Arthur Frederick Hurst, Royal Army Medical Corps
- Temp Capt. and Bt. Maj. Charles Edward Inglis, Royal Engineers
- Temp Maj. Jeremiah Inns, Royal ArtilleryS
- Maj. Leonard Paul Irby, King's Royal Rifle Corps
- Lt. Ernest Lascelles Iremonger, Scottish Horse
- Jessie Millicent Jackson RRC Matron, Queen Alexandra's Imperial Military Nursing Service Reserve
- Lt. Samuel Jackson, Royal Army Service Corps
- Capt. George Lionel Jameson, Royal Engineers
- Quartermaster and Capt. Ernest Janes, Royal Army Medical Corps
- Maj. William Jardine TD Royal Scots
- Capt. William Bertie Jarvis, Leicestershire Regiment
- Lt.-Col. Patrick Douglas Jeffreys CB Kent Volunteer Corps
- Maj. and Bt. Lt.-Col. Reginald Frank Jelley, Royal Engineers
- Maj. Harold Jellicorse, Royal Sussex Regiment
- Lt. Reginald Jeffery, Royal Field Artillery
- Capt. George John Jenkins FRCS Royal Army Medical Corps
- Temp Lt.-Col. John Alexander Jenkins, East Yorkshire Regiment
- Temp Capt. Herbert Cecil Joel MBE Royal Army Ordnance Corps
- Lt. Frederick Nelson Johns, Royal Engineers
- Lt. Albert Johnson MC Royal Field Artillery
- Maj. Henry Campbell Johnson, King's Own Yorkshire Light Infantry
- Maj. Bruce Campbell Johnston, Royal Engineers
- Capt. Edgar William Jones, Royal Engineers
- Temp Capt. Russell Jones, Welsh Regiment
- Lt.-Col. Stephen James Melville Jopp
- Maj. William Alfred Jupp, East Lancashire Regiment
- Quartermaster and Capt. Herbert Alfred Joy MBE Royal Artillery
- Maj. and Bt. Lt.-Col. Henry Albert Kaulbach, Royal Lancaster Regiment
- Temp Maj. Herbert Davenport Kay
- Capt. Cyril Arthur Keays, Royal Army Service Corps
- Quartermaster and Capt. John James Keene MBE Royal Army Service Corps
- Temp Lt. Gerald Keith, Royal Army Ordnance Corps
- Quartermaster and Maj. James Albert Kellett, Royal Engineers
- Lt. Richard Cecil Kelly, London Regiment
- Maj. William Redmond Prendergast Kemmis-Betty, Royal Berkshire Regiment
- Maj. Edmund Roger Allday Kerrison CMG late Royal Artillery
- Capt. Robert Ellis Key, York and Lancaster Regiment
- Lt.-Col. Robert Robertson Kimmitt, London Regiment
- Capt. William Henry King, Connaught Rangers
- Temp Maj. John Rudolph Kingston, Royal Engineers
- Rev. Michael Ward Kinloch, Royal Army Chaplains' Department
- Maj. Edmund Bertram Kirby, Royal Field Artillery
- Lt.-Col. Albert Edward Kirk VD West Yorkshire Regiment
- Lt. James Kirkland, Royal Army Ordnance Corps
- Lt. Alexander Kennedy Kirsop, Northumberland Fusiliers
- Maj. Alexander Wentworth Kitson, Royal Army Service Corps
- Temp Maj. Paul Hengrave Kitson, Royal Army Service Corps
- Capt. Charles Louis William Morley Knight DSO Royal Artillery
- Maj. James Stuart Knox, East Yorkshire Regiment
- Temp Lt. John Brown Laidlaw, Royal Engineers
- Temp Maj. Bertram Lambert, Royal Engineers
- Maj. George Herbert Lambert TD London Regiment
- Temp Maj. Thomas Erskine Lambert, Royal Army Service Corps
- Maj. and Bt. Lt.-Col. George Charles Lambton DSO Worcestershire Regiment
- Maj. Henry Thornton Laming DSO 5th Res. Cav. Regiment
- Lt.-Col. Philip Langclale, East Riding Yeomanry
- Lt.-Col. Percy Edward Langworthy-Parry DSO TD London Regiment
- Maj. George Reginald Lascelles, Royal Fusiliers
- Temp Maj. Walter William Laskey, Royal Army Service Corps
- Temp Maj. John Ion Latham, Royal Engineers
- Maj. Ernest Browning Lathbury, Royal Army Medical Corps
- Maj. Herbert Curling Laverton, Royal Highlanders
- Temp Capt. Robert William Rowland Law MC
- Maj. Hervey Major Lawrence DSO Scottish Rifles
- Lt.-Col. Henry Gordon Leahy, Royal Garrison Artillery
- Maj. Alfred Leamy, Royal Army Ordnance Corps
- Lt.-Col. Harold Ledward
- Maj. John Robert Lee FRCS
- Lt.-Col. Roderick Livingstone Lees DSO VD Lancashire Fusiliers
- Lt. Victor Lefobure, Essex Regiment
- Maj. Edward James Leggett, Royal Army Ordnance Corps
- Maj. Robert Anthony Linington Leggett DSO Worcestershire Regiment
- Capt. Geoffrey Hamilton Leigh, South Lancashire Regiment
- Temp Maj. H. S. Le Rossignol, Royal Jersey Militia
- Col. Robert Thomas Morland Lethbridge, Army Pay Department
- Lt.-Col. Charles Cameron Leveson-Gower CMG Royal Artillery
- Temp Capt. George Ernest Lewis, Royal Army Service Corps
- Maj. Cuthbert Hillyer Ley, Royal Engineers
- Quartermaster and Maj. Harry Sylvanus Lickmau, Ext. Reg. Empl
- Hon Maj. Willie Cresswell Link, Royal Army Ordnance Corps
- Capt. Victor Alexander John Hope, Marquess of Linlithgow, Lothians and Border Horse
- Maj. Sir John Lister-Kaye Bt Royal Army Service Corps
- Bt. Lt.-Col. John Little, Northumberland Regiment
- Maj. Marchall William Litton, Royal Irish Fusiliers
- Maj. George William David Bowen Lloyd, Royal Welsh Fusiliers
- Capt. Thomas Lodge, Royal West Surrey Regiment
- Maj. Francis Carleton Logan Logan, Lancashire Fusiliers
- Maj. William Logan, Royal Army Veterinary Corps
- Maj. Sydney Francis McIlree Lomer, King's Royal Rifle Corps
- Capt. Gerard Hanslip Long, Suffolk Regiment
- Capt. Henry John Leicester Longden MBE Army School Department
- Maj. Charles Frederick Gemley Low, Royal Army Ordnance Corps
- Quartermaster and Capt. James Lindsay Low, Royal Engineers
- Temp Maj. Andrew-Alfred Lowe, Royal Engineers
- Lt.-Col. Thomas Enoch Lowe, South Staffordshire Regiment
- Temp Maj. Reginald Hugh Lucas, Royal Army Service Corps
- Col. Thomas Lucas Woodwright Lucas MBE Glamorgan Volunteer Corps
- Capt. Dudley Owen Lumley MBE Wiltshire Regiment
- Edith Mary Lyde RRC Matron, Queen Alexandra's Imperial Military Nursing Service
- Maj. Arthur Abram Lyle, London Regiment
- Temp Capt. Oliver Lyle, Highland Light Infantry
- Maj. Charles Joseph Edward Addis McArthur, Kings Own Scottish Borderers
- Capt. Henry Montray Jones McCance
- Capt. Frederic Ewing McClellan, Middlesex Regiment
- Temp Maj. Michael McCormack MC Royal West Surrey Regiment
- Maj. John McDermott, Indian Army
- Temp Hon Lt.-Col. Peter Macdiurmid Royal Army Medical Corps
- Maj. Andrew Edward Macdonald, Cameron Highlanders
- Capt. Angus G. Macdonald Royal Army Medical Corps
- 2nd Lt. James McDonald, King's Own Scottish Borderers
- Maj. John McI. McDougall, Royal Garrison Artillery
- Maj. Donald Keith McDowell CMG Royal Army Medical Corps
- Temp Maj. Samuel Johnson McDowell, Army Pay Department
- Temp Maj. James McEwen, Staff for Royal Engineers Service
- Maj. Albert William Crawford McFall, Yorkshire Light Infantry
- Temp Capt. Charles Hamilton McGuinness
- Capt. James Douglas MacIndoe MC Scots Guards
- Capt. Alexander Donald MacKeanzie, Royal Engineers
- Maj. Colin Mansfield Mackenzie DSO London Regiment
- Capt. Eric Francis Wallace Mackenzie MC Royal Army Medical Corps
- Lt.-Col. Robert Wilson McKergow, Sussex Yeomanry
- Lt.-Col. Reginald L'Estrange McKerrell, Argyll and Sutherland Highlanders
- Lt. Archibald Donald MacKinnon CMG
- Rev. James MacLeod, Royal Army Chaplains' Department
- Maj. Kellerman Eyre McMahon, Shropshire Light Infantry
- Maj. and Bt. Lt.-Col. Andrew McMunn, Royal Army Medical Corps
- Rev. Ronald MacPherson, Royal Army Chaplains' Department
- Capt. and Bt. Maj. Gordon Nevil Macready DSO MC Royal Engineers
- Maj. Henry Patrick Magill, North Lancashire Regiment
- H.H. Prince Maj. Charles Mahé de Chenal de la Bourdonnais, Royal Field Artillery
- Lt.-Col. Frederick Colin Maitland, Viscount Maitland, Northumberland Fusiliers
- Capt. Arthur Griffiths Maitland-Jones MC Royal Army Medical Corps
- Temp Maj. Matthew James Manuia Makalua
- Maj. Edward John Malim, Machine Gun Corps
- Maj. John Charles Medland Manley, Royal Artillery
- Maj. William Edward Manley, Royal Artillery
- Maj. Reginald Ingram Marians, London Regiment
- Temp Maj. Edward Seaborn Marks
- Temp Capt. Morris Edgar Marples, Royal Army Service Corps
- Maj. Charles Howard Marsden, Yorkshire Regiment
- Temp Capt. Herbert Westmorland Marshall, Royal Engineers
- Maj. Mark Henry Marshall, Royal Army Service Corps
- Capt. Charles Jasper Martin MC Royal Army Service Corps
- Temp Lt.-Col. Horace Martin, Royal Engineers
- Capt. William Edward Maskell, Devonshire Regiment
- Temp Maj. James Ernest Mason, Royal Army Service Corps
- Capt. Frederick Hill Master, Royal Engineers
- Capt. William Harold Mather, Royal Engineers
- Temp Maj. Edward Matthews, Cheshire Regiment
- Temp Capt. Ernest James Matthews, Rem. Service
- Capt. Llewellin Washington Matthews
- Lt. RichardJohnCaswell Maunsell
- Temp Maj. Arthur Henry May, Royal Engineers
- Temp Capt. Arthur John May, Royal Engineers
- Temp Maj. Mark James Mayhew, Royal Army Service Corps
- Temp Maj. Edgar William Mayor, West Riding Regiment
- Temp Maj. Charles Mead, Royal Army Service Corps
- Capt. Harry Edward Meade, Royal Fusiliers
- Lt.-Col. William Mellis TD Gordon Highlanders
- Capt. Charles Edward Mepham, Royal Army Ordnance Corps
- Capt. Leonard Charles Rudolph Messel, East Kent Regiment
- Maj. Charles Bayard Messiter DSO Gloucestershire Regiment
- Lt. Lionel Harry Methuen MC Argyll and Sutherland Highlanders
- Hon Capt. Charles Henry Milburn, Royal Army Medical Corps
- Lt.-Col. Thomas Alan Milburn, Border Regiment
- Lt.-Col. Harry Cyril Millican, Royal Army Service Corps
- Temp Maj. Francis Henry Millman
- Lt. William Henry Ennor Millman
- Capt. George Wardlaw Milne, Royal Army Medical Corps
- Temp Lt.-Col. Arthur Brownlow Mitchell, Royal Army Medical Corps
- Lt.-Col. Spencer Mitchell, Manchester Regiment
- Maj. Francis Arthur Molony, Royal Engineers
- Maj. John Duncan Monro, Royal Engineers
- Lt.-Col. Lord George William Montagu-Douglas-Scott, late Lothians and Border Horse
- Maj. Stewart Francis Montague, Royal Artillery
- Maj. Victor Robert Montgomerie, 2nd Life Guards
- Temp Capt. James Stuart Hamilton Moore
- Maj. William Moore, London Regiment
- Temp Maj. Kenyon Pascoe Vaughan Morgan, Royal Army Service Corps
- Temp Maj. Godfrey Ewaft Morgans, Royal Engineers
- Capt. Ernest FitzRoy Morrison-Bell, Royal Wiltshire Yeomanry
- Temp Maj. John Smythe Morrow Royal Army Medical Corps
- Temp Lt. James Thomas Morton-Clarke MBE Royal Army Service Corps
- Capt. Gavin Black Loudon Motherwell, Royal Scots Fusiliers
- Capt. John Coney Moulton, Wiltshire Regiment
- Lt.-Col. Herbert William Moxon, Staff for Royal Engineers Service
- Capt. John Muir, Royal Army Medical Corps
- Lt.-Col. Robert Bunten Muir, Leicestershire Yeomanry
- Capt. the Hon Charles Henry George Mulholland DSO 11th Hussars
- Maj. James Murphy, late Royal Field Artillery
- Lt.-Col. Alan Sim Murray, North Staffordshire Regiment
- Temp Capt. Everitt George Dunne Murray, Royal Army Medical Corps
- Temp Capt. William Alfred Murray Royal Army Medical Corps
- Temp Capt. William Newcome Musgrave, Royal Army Service Corps
- Temp Capt. Edward Jonah Nathan
- Maj. Arthur Nelson, Staff
- Lt.-Col. William Nelson, late Scottish Rifles
- Temp Capt. George Nesbit MC Northumberland Fusiliers
- Lt. Cyril John Nesbitt-Dufort, Royal Army Service Corps
- Temp Maj. William Henry Newham, Royal Army Service Corps
- Maj. StephenGuy Newton, 12th Battalion Yorkshire Light Infantry
- Maj. Thomas Cochrane Newton DSO Royal Field Artillery
- Maj. Cosmos Charles Richard Nevill DSO
- Capt. John Nicol VD London Regiment
- Maj. Edward Alfred Nicholls, Staff for Royal Engineers Secv
- Maj. Thomas Brinsley Nicholson, West India Regiment
- Temp Maj. Stephen William Nicholson MC Royal Artillery
- Temp Capt. Henry James Nind, Royal Artillery
- Capt. Charles George Ashburton Nix, Res
- Capt. Richard Noble, 7th Dragoon Guards
- Maj. Henry Marshall Nornabell DSO Royal Field Artillery
- Lt.-Col. George Roubiliac Hodges Nugent, Royal Artillery
- Capt. John O'Brien, Hampshire Regiment
- Maj. Manus Basil Hugh O'Donel, Royal Engineers
- Capt. Léonce L'Hermite Ogier, Royal Jersey Militia
- Capt. Alan Grant Ogilvie MBE Royal Field Artillery
- Maj. and Bt. Lt.-Col. Alexander Ogilvie TD Royal Engineers
- Maj. Arthur Bertram Ogle, Royal Engineers
- Lt.-Col. Christopher George Oldfield CMG Royal Army Ordnance Corps
- Maj. Arthur Edwin Oppenheim, Indian Army
- Temp Lt. William Oswald Orford, Royal Field Artillery
- Capt. Guy Allen Colpoys Ormsby-Johnson MC Army Pay Department
- Capt. and Bt. Maj. Frank George Orr, Royal Field Artillery
- Maj. Patrick O'Sullivan, Royal Artillery
- Lt.-Col. Robert James William Oswald, Royal Army Medical Corps
- Temp Capt. and Bt. Maj. Franas Davidson Outram, Royal Engineers
- Lt.-Col. Herbert Hawkesworth Owtram, Lancashire Volunteer Corps
- Maj. Edmund Christopher Packe DSO Royal Fusiliers
- Maj. Frederick Edward Packe, Welsh Regiment
- Temp Maj. Frederick Henry Padfield
- Temp Maj. Archibald James Palmer, Tank Corps
- Temp Capt. Ernest-Henry Palmer, Royal Army Ordnance Corps
- Temp Maj. Edward Percy Hamilton Pardoe, King's African Rifles
- Maj. Francis Hearle Parkin, South Staffordshire Regiment
- Lt.-Col. Percival George Parkinson, Royal Army Ordnance Corps
- Capt. Harry Gordon Parkyn, Rifle Brigade
- Maj. Charles Lister Parmiter, King's Liverpool Regiment
- Capt. Cecil William Chase Parr, Malay States Volunteer Rifles
- Capt. Dealtrey Charles Part, 21st Lancers
- Maj. Edward Cecil Morgan Parry, East Kent Regiment
- Lt.-Col. Christopher Thackray Parsons Royal Army Medical Corps
- Capt. Edward Laker Paske, Duke of Cornwall's Light Infantry
- Capt. James Patch, Devonshire Regiment
- Maj. Daniel Wells Patterson Royal Army Medical Corps
- Temp Maj. George Hedworth Pattinson MC Royal Engineers
- Capt. William Paxman, London Regiment
- Lt.-Col. Walter King Peake, Gloucestershire Regiment
- Temp Quartermaster and Maj. John Wesley Pearce, Royal Engineers
- Temp Maj. William Pearce, Royal Engineers
- Capt. Charles Edmund Pearson
- Temp Maj. Jiohn Barrington Pearson, Royal Engineers
- Maj. Robert Stanley Pearson, Yorkshire Hussars
- Capt. Ernest Hubert Pease, Yorkshire Regiment
- Capt. Arthur Charlesworth Peebles, Royal Engineers
- Maj. James Penketh, South Staffordshire Regiment
- Temp Capt. and Bt. Maj. Francis Westby Perceval, Royal Army Ordnance Corps
- Maj. Albert Augustus Perkins TD Welsh Regiment
- Capt. Aubrey Edmond Pery-Knox-Gore, Yorkshire Light Infantry
- Lt.-Col. Henry Cecil Petre CMG Rifle Brigade
- Temp Capt. Cyril Charles Phillips, Royal Garrison Artillery
- Capt. and Bt. Maj. Charles Edmund Stanley Phillips, Royal West Kent Regiment
- Lt. Ernest William Phillips, Royal Garrison Artillery
- Quartermaster and Capt. William John Phillips, Royal Artillery
- Temp Capt. Alrfred Cleveland Pickett, Royal Army Medical Corps
- Capt. Wellesley George Pigott, Rifle Brigade
- Maj. William Rattray Pirie, Royal Army Medical Corps
- Maj. George Newton Pitt Royal Army Medical Corps
- Capt. Stewart Aitken Pixley, T.F. Res
- Capt. James Charles Pocock, Royal Engineers
- Temp Capt. Sydney Elsdon Pocock, Royal Army Service Corps
- Lt.-Col. Arthur Erskine St. Vincent Pollard, Border Regiment
- Capt. Allan Bingham Pollok, 7th Hrs
- Maj. and Bt. Lt.-Col. Thomas Anselan Pollok-Morris, Highland Light Infantry
- Maj. Henry Reynold Poole DSO Royal Garrison Artillery
- Temp Hon Maj. Edmund Daniel Porges
- Maj. and Bt. Lt.-Col. James Archer Potter, Leicestershire Regiment
- Maj. Thomas James Potter, Royal Army Medical Corps
- Capt. and Bt. Maj. Charles Potts
- Capt. Faville Clement Poulton, Royal Army Ordnance Corps
- Maj. George Robert Powell, North Somerset Yeomanry
- Lt.-Col. Assheton Pownall TD London Regiment
- Lt. James Dayidson Pratt, Gordon Highlanders
- Maj. Charles Henry Beeston Prescott-Westcar, East Kent Yeomanry
- Lt.-Col. William Tertius Pretty TD Suffolk Regiment
- Capt. and Bt. Maj. William Henry Russell Prewer, Royal Artillery
- Maj. and Bt. Lt.-Col. Geoffrey Robert Pridham DSO Royal Engineers
- Beatrice Ada Priestley, Unit Administrator, Queen Mary's Army Auxiliary Corps
- Maj. William Priestly, Durham Light Infantry
- Capt. Alexander Ferguson Primrose, Royal Engineers
- Temp Lt.-Col. Seton Sidney Pringle, Royal Army Medical Corps
- Maj. Harold Astley Somerset Prior DSO Yorkshire Regiment
- Lt.-Col. William Godfrey Probert, Royal Army Service Corps
- Temp Lt.-Col. William Thomas Prout CMG Royal Army Medical Corps
- Maj. Arthur William Purser MC Royal Field Artillery
- Temp Maj. Francis Carmichael Purser, Royal Army Medical Corps
- Temp Maj. Thomas Fortune Purves, Royal Engineers
- Lt.-Col. George Elliot Aubone Pyle, London Regiment
- Capt. Frederick Dennis Pyne, Royal Engineers
- Lt. Raymond Fitzwilliam Quirke, Royal Garrison Artillery
- Hon Lt.-Col. WilliamEnsley Raley, late York and Lancaster Regiment
- Maj. Thomas Rankin
- Quartermaster and Hon Capt. Robert Sheffield Ransome, late Royal Welsh Fusiliers (dated 18 March 1919.)
- Rev. Albert Edward Rawr, Royal Army Chaplains' Department
- Capt. and Bt. Maj. Geoffrey Grahame Rawson MC Royal Engineers
- Capt. Archibald Hugh Read, North Staffordshire Regiment
- Lt.-Col. George Reavell TD Northumberland Fusiliers
- Capt. Patrick John Reeves, Royal Berkshire Regiment
- Capt. Sidney George Redman, Northumberland Fusiliers
- Maj. Richard Meadows Rendel, Royal Artillery
- Capt. Thomas Shuttleworth Kendall, Dorsetshire Regiment
- Maj. Louis George Stanley Reynolds, London Regiment
- Maj. Sidney Latimer Reynolds, Royal Army Service Corps
- Capt. William Charles Noel Reynolds, Irish Guards
- Maj. Hubert Victor Rhodes, Nottinghamshire and Derbyshire Regiment
- Temp Capt. Stanislas Matthew Hastings Rhodes
- Maj. Malcolm Brown Bookey Riall, West Yorkshire Regiment
- Maj. Henry Meredyth Richards, Royal Welsh Fusiliers
- Maj. John Charles Field Richards, Hampshire Regiment
- Capt. Thomas Richardson
- Maj. Edwin Hautonville Richardson
- Maj. and Hon Lt.-Col. Charles du Plat Richardson-Griffiths DSO Gloucestershire Regiment
- Maj. Brownlow Riddell Royal Army Medical Corps
- Lt. Robert Edward Ridgway, Royal Garrison Artillery
- Capt. and Bt. Maj. Blyth Ritchie, 13th Hussars
- Temp Capt. Edward Guy Ripley, Royal Army Service Corps
- Maj. Arthur Neil Stewart Roberts, Royal West Surrey Regiment
- Temp Maj. Frank Wereat Roberts VD Royal Engineers (ret.)
- Maj. George Fossett Roberts, Royal Field Artillery
- Lt.-Col. Hugh Bradley Roberts, Royal Artillery
- Maj. and Bt. Lt.-Col. David Stephen Robertson, Royal Scots Fusiliers
- Maj. and Bt. Lt.-Col. Frederick William Robertson, Royal Engineers
- Temp Lt.-Col. John Kerr Robertson, Royal Engineers
- Temp Maj. Malcolm Robertson MC
- Maj. Lancelot Irby Oxford Robins, Welsh Regiment
- Lt.-Col. Benjamin Robert Roche, Bedfordshire Regiment
- Temp Lt. Lincoln Coslett Rogers, Royal Army Ordnance Corps
- Temp Maj. Thomas Leslie Rogers, Army Pay Department
- Quartermaster and Lt.-Col. Ambrose George Rose, Royal Army Service Corps
- Maj. Conrad Ross, Royal Artillery
- Hon Capt. William Ross, late Oxfordshire and Buckinghamshire Light Infantry
- Temp Maj. Philip Simpson Rostron, late Royal Horse Artillery
- Maj. Robert Houston Rowan, Royal Engineers
- Temp Capt. Farnel Rowbotham, Royal Army Ordnance Corps
- Capt. diaries Rowell, Northumberland Fusiliers
- Capt. Robert Pugh Rowlands FRCS Royal Army Medical Corps
- Lt.-Col. Edmund Royds MP Lincolnshire Volunteer Corps
- Capt. Ernest Rupert Royle
- Lt. Henry Rummius, Gloucestershire Regiment
- Maj. and Bt. Lt.-Col. Charles Rundle, Royal Army Medical Corps
- Lt.-Col. and Bt. Col. Frank Montagu Randall CB DSO City of London Volunteer Corps
- Temp Capt. Edmond Cecil Russell
- Capt. Thomas Russell, Royal Army Medical Corps
- Hon Capt. Hugh Septimus Kroenig Ryan, Royal Engineers
- Quartermaster and Maj. Daniel Sallis, Worcestershire Regiment
- Maj. Samuel George Sanders, 4th Dragoon Guards
- Temp Maj. Robert William Philip Sands, Army Pay Department
- Lt.-Col. John Edward Sarsoaa, Leicestershire Volunteer Corps
- Maj. Clement Richard Satterthwaite, Royal Engineers
- Lt.-Col. William Arthur Gore Saunders-Knox-Gore, Royal Artillery
- Capt. and Bt. Maj. Charles Carleton Saunders-O'Mahoney, Royal Army Service Corps
- Maj. Clare Ruxton Uvedale Suvile DSO Royal Fusiliers
- Maj. George William Sayer, Royal Engineers
- Maj. Raymond Cecil Sayers, Royal Artillery
- Hon Capt. Henry Alexander Schank, Lancashire Fusiliers
- Maj. William Ernest Schofield, Royal Army Veterinary Corps
- Capt. Ivor Buchanan Wyndham Scott, Royal Artillery
- Quartermaster and Maj. James Scott DCM Manchester Regiment
- Capt. Edward William Howet Blackburn Scratton, Royal 1st Devonshire Yeomanry
- Lt. James Gerald Lamb Searight, Royal Scots
- Capt. Keith John Seth-Smith, Royal Field Artillery
- Capt. Edward Seymour MVO DSO Grenadier Guards
- Maj. Evelyn Francis Edward Seymour DSO (Royal Dublin Fusiliers)
- Lt. Lionel Seymour, Hertfordshire Regiment
- Maj. Roger Cecil Seys DSO Royal Artillery
- Lt. Col. Leonard Julius Shadwell, Lancashire Fusiliers
- Capt. Rowland Sharp, Royal Engineers
- Lt. James Henry Montague Shaw
- Capt. Thomas Sheedy, Royal Army Medical Corps
- Lt. Eric William Sheppard, Royal West Kent Regiment
- Capt. George William Shore, Royal Army Medical Corps
- Maj. Henry George Shorto, Royal Army Service Corps
- Maj. W. Malacca Sime, Volunteer Rifles
- Lt.-Col. John Henry Lang Sims TD North Lancashire Regiment
- Maj. Robert Dunbar Sinclair Weanyss, Gordon Highlanders
- Maj. Eric Ommanney Skaife, Royal Welsh Fusiliers
- Maj. Arthur Briton Smallman DSO Royal Army Medical Corps
- Lt. Thomas Fraser Mackenzie Smart, Northumberland Fusiliers
- Lt.-Col. William Wintringham Smethurst, Royal Field Artillery
- Capt. Arthur William Smith, Cambridgeshire Regiment
- Temp Maj. Charles Edward Smith, Army Pay Department
- Lt.-Col. George Frederick Smith VD Royal Army Service Corps
- Maj. Clarence Gorton Ross Smith, Army Pay Department
- Temp Maj. Frederick Hargreaves Smith, Royal Army Service Corps
- Maj. George Rainier de Herriez Smith, Indian Army Reserve of Officers, attd. Rem. Service
- Maj. George Wilson Smith, King's Own Scottish Borderers
- Lt.-Col. Julian Carter Carrington Smith Indian Medical Service
- Capt. S. Smith, Malay States Volunteer Rifles
- Temp Capt. William Stanley Smith
- Maj. Henry Cecil East Smithett, York and Lancaster Regiment
- Maj. Standish George Smithwick, Royal Dublin Fusiliers
- Maj. Frederick Philip Smyly
- Temp Lt. Leonard Fowler Snelling, Royal Army Ordnance Corps
- Capt. and Bt. Maj. Richard Talbot Snowden-Smith, Royal Army Service Corps
- Capt. Arthur Granville Shames, Coldstream Guards
- Maj. Charles Henry Fitzroy, Lord Southampton, Yorkshire Regiment
- Capt. Edward Chayton Sowerby, Suffolk Regiment
- Lt. Arthur Owen Spafford, Royal Engineers
- Maj. Walter Augustus Sparrow, Royal Engineers
- Maj. and Bt. Lt.-Col. Harrison Spencer, Royal Artillery
- Capt. and Bt. Maj. Herbert Eames Spencer, Royal Wiltshire Yeomanry
- Maj. Walter George Spencer FRCS Royal Army Medical Corps
- Temp Lt. Archibald Borthwick Spens, Royal Army Service Corps
- Capt. John Ivan Spensi, Scottish Rifles
- Capt. Thomas L. Squires, Royal Artillery
- Maj. Arthur Clement Staniberg Royal Army Medical Corps
- Temp Capt. Henry Edmund Standage, Royal Army Service Corps
- Temp Maj. William Percy Standish
- Temp Capt. Robert Vinin Stanley Stanley, Royal Army Service Corps
- Capt. William Henry Stanley-Jones, Seaforth Highlanders
- Lt.-Col. Gerald Walter James Fitzgerald Stannus, 1st City of London Yeomanry
- Capt. and Bt. Maj. Guy Stewart St. Aubyn, King's Royal Rifle Corps
- Temp Maj. Frederick Owen Stanford, Royal Engineers
- Maj. Miles John Stapylton, Royal Army Service Corps
- Temp Capt. John Stavers MVO Royal Army Service Corps
- Hon Capt. Henry Squire Steele
- Maj. Henry Alexander Steaming TD 10th Battalion, London Regiment
- Maj. George Andrew Stephen, Gordon Highlanders
- Temp Maj. Francis Trent Stephens, King's African Rifles
- Maj. Leslie Nalder Stephens, Royal Artillery
- Temp Lt. John Stephenson
- Maj. Frederick John Stevens, West Yorkshire Regiment
- Maj. Robert Stevenson MC Royal Army Ordnance Corps
- Maj. Reginald Holden Steward, Wiltshire Regiment
- Lt.-Col. Albert Fortescue Stewart CMG Suffolk Regiment
- Maj. Charles Stewart, Worcestershire Regiment
- Capt. James Allan Stewart, Royal Scots Fusiliers, attd. Nigeria Regiment
- Lt.-Col. Alexander Brodie Seton Stewart, Royal Army Medical Corps
- Maj. James Stewart, Royal Engineers
- Temp Capt. Harold Ramsay Stobie
- Capt. Hubert Francis Stokes, Royal Irish Fusiliers
- Maj. William Noel Stokes DSC Royal Army Ordnance Corps
- Temp Maj. James Richard Neville Stopford, Viscount Stopford
- Capt. Herbert Stott, Cheshire Regiment
- Temp Capt. William Harle Stott, Royal Army Medical Corps
- Capt. William Stoyle, Royal Field Artillery, attd. Royal Army Ordnance Corps
- Acting Maj. Cecil John Charles Street MC Royal Garrison Artillery
- Temp Capt. Robert Henry Struben
- Maj. George Kingston Sullivan MC Yorkshire Light Infantry
- Maj. Russell Henry Jocelyn Swan FRCS Royal Army Medical Corps
- Lt. Ernest Edward Swann, Essex Regiment
- Capt. Henry Carol Sweeting, King's Royal Rifle Corps
- Maj. Robert William Tate, Unattd. List
- Maj. Cecil George Taylor
- Maj. Charles Lancelot Deslandes Taylor, Royal Army Medical Corps
- Capt. Jameis Taylor, Royal Army Medical Corps
- Temp Capt. Robert Clark Taylor
- Temp Maj. Max Teichman, Royal Army Service Corps
- Maj. Robert Temperley TD DL Northumberland Fusiliers
- Temp Capt. Henry Moncrieff Tennent, Royal Army Service Corps
- Temp Lt. Francis Theakston, Royal Engineers
- Temp Maj. Lewis Thomas
- Maj. A. M. Thompson, Singapore Vols.
- Lt.-Col. George Thompson TD Bedfordshire Regiment
- Temp Capt. Henry Charles Stephens Thomson, Royal Army Service Corps
- Capt. David Thomson Royal Army Medical Corps
- Maj. William Thorburn TD King's Own Scottish Borderers
- Capt. William Crockett Thome, Royal Engineers
- Maj. Gerald Thorp, Royal Engineers
- Temp Maj. Richard Eustace Tickell
- Lt.-Col. James Tidbury Royal Army Medical Corps
- Maj. Henry William Marrett Tims Royal Army Medical Corps
- Quartermaster and Capt. Alexander Gray Tod, Royal Army Medical Corps
- Lt. William Norman Tod, London Regiment
- Lt.-Col. Morton James Baring Tomlin, London Regiment
- Maj. Robert Ernest Tomlin-Money-Shewan, Royal Engineers
- Capt. and Bt. Maj. Charles Bailey Toms
- Maj. Arthur Seymour Toogood
- Lt.-Col. Frederick Sherman Toogood Royal Army Medical Corps
- Lt. Henry William Towner, Royal Garrison Artillery
- Maj. William Maxwell Tracy, Royal Army Ordnance Corps
- Temp Lt.-Col. Paul Cuningham Edward Tribe, Royal Army Medical Corps
- Lt. John Charles Trout, Royal Scots Fusiliers
- Lt. John Monro Troutbeck, London Regiment
- Quartermaster and Lt.-Col. Albert Napoleon Tucker, Royal Engineers
- Capt. Richard Jennings Tucker, Bermuda Rifles Corps, attd. Lincolnshire Regiment
- Temp Capt. and Bt. Maj. William John Tulloch, Royal Army Medical Corps
- Maj. and Bt. Lt.-Col. John Arthur Tupman, Gloucestershire Regiment
- Lt.-Col. Ralph Edward Tyler, Royal Garrison Artillery
- Maj. Reginald Bramley Tyrrell, Royal Army Ordnance Corps
- Temp Lt. Sydney Gorton Vanderfelt, Royal Army Service Corps
- Lt.-Col. John Vansagnew, Indian Army
- Hon Maj. Charles James Vasey
- Temp Maj. Gomer Miles Vaughan, Royal Engineers
- Lt.-Col. Alfred Vella, Royal Malta Artillery
- Capt. Claude Malcolm Hamilton Venour, Hampshire Regiment, attd. Nigeria Regiment
- Temp Lt.-Col. William James Nathaniel Vincent Royal Army Medical Corps
- Quartermaster and Capt. Archibald Walker, Royal Engineers
- Quartermaster and Maj. John Walker DCM Yorkshire Regiment
- Maj. John Gustavus Russell Walsh, Royal Berkshire Regiment
- Capt. Archibald Stephen Walter
- Maj. Robert Francis Walters, Labour Corps, attd. Essex Regiment
- Temp Maj. George Laird Walton, Royal Engineers
- Capt. Granville Walton, Royal Engineers
- Lt.-Col. Cecil Wanliss, South Lancashire Regiment, attd. Manchester Regiment
- Lt. Oscar Emanuel Warburg, Royal Garrison Artillery
- Beatrice Gascoigne Ward MBE Asst. Commandant, Women's Legion
- Temp Maj. John Dudley Ward, Army Pay Department
- Quartermaster and Maj. Thomas Ward, Royal Artillery
- Lt.-Col. Charles Edward Warde, Kent Volunteer Corps
- Temp Maj. David Risk Wardrop, Army Pay Department
- Lt.-Col. Charles Edward Warner TD Kent Cyclist Battalion
- Quartermaster and Maj. John Warrener, Royal Fusiliers
- Maj. Bertram Arthur Warry, Essex Regiment
- Maj. Robert Sydney Waters, Pathans, Indian Army
- Maj. Edward Owen Wathen, Northumberland Fusiliers
- Capt. Evelyn Cyril Watson, 7th Dragoon Guards
- Capt. George Leybourne Watson, Royal Scots
- Temp Maj. James Robert Watson, Army Pay Department
- Maj. Humphrey Watts, Cheshire Regiment
- Capt. G. R. H. Webb, Royal Engineers
- Temp Capt. John Montague Webb, 2nd King Edward's Horse
- Maj. Philip Webb, Royal Army Ordnance Corps
- Temp Lt.-Col. Ralph Gotland Webber
- Capt. Sir Augustus Frederick Walpole Edward Webster Bt Grenadier Guards
- Temp Capt. Charles Kingsley Webster
- Temp Capt. Henry Holman Weekes, Royal Army Medical Corps
- Maj. Arthur Francis Percival Wehner, Royal Garrison Artillery
- Maj. Cecil George Wellesley, East Yorkshire Regiment
- Maj. Harvey Welman, Indian Army
- Maj. David Thomson Welsh, York and Lancaster Regiment
- Temp Capt. Charles James West Royal Army Medical Corps
- Lt.-Col. Richard Melbourne West DSO Royal Army Medical Corps
- Lt. Frederick Newell Westbury TD
- Temp Lt.-Col. George Westcott, Scottish Rifles
- Maj. Reginald Salter Weston CMG Manchester Regiment
- Maj. William Edward May Wetherell, Bedfordshire Regiment
- Temp Capt. Charles Wheeler, Royal Army Service Corps
- Maj. George Greenhough Whiffin, Royal West Surrey Regiment
- Capt. and Bt. Maj. Arthur Marmaduke Whitaker, Yorkshire Regiment
- Hon Lt.-Col. Ernest William White Royal Army Medical Corps
- Temp Maj. The Hon Francis William White
- Temp Capt. John Christian White
- Maj. Robert Fortescue Moresby White VD Leicestershire Regiment
- Lt. The Hon Ronald George Whiteley, Royal Garrison Artillery
- Maj. Robert Langton Digby Whitfield, Royal Army Ordnance Corps
- Maj. Carl Wiggins, Royal Army Ordnance Corps
- Lt.-Col. George Alfred Wigley TD Nottinghamshire and Derbyshire Regiment
- Capt. Arthur Roland George Wilberforce, Royal Sussex Regiment
- Capt. Thomas Paul Wiley, Royal Engineers
- Maj. and Hon Lt.-Col. Stephen Willcock, Manchester Regiment
- Maj. Edmund Ernest Wilford DSO Indian Army
- Capt. Arthur Frederick Basil Williams
- Temp Lt. Alfred Harry Williams, Royal Army Service Corps
- Hon Temp Capt. Albert Howard Williams
- Temp Capt. Ernest Ulysses Williams, Royal Army Medical Corps
- Temp Lt. Harold Williams, Royal Engineers
- Temp Maj. Stanley Walter Williams, Royal Army Medical Corps
- Capt. Vivian Dunbar Stanley Williams, 5th Dragoon Guards
- Maj. Frederick Willoughby VD 1st Volunteer Battalion, Northamptonshire Regiment
- Capt. Charles Spencer Wilson, Suffolk Regiment
- Maj. and Bt. Lt.-Col. Godfrey Harold Alfred Wilson MBE
- Lt.-Col. Henry Christopher Bruce Wilson, York and Lancaster Regiment
- Temp Capt. James Robert Menzies Wilson, Royal Engineers
- Temp Capt. William Perceval Wilson
- Maj. Douglas George Nugent Irving Wimberley, Army Pay Department
- Capt. John Windham-Wright, Royal West Surrey Regiment
- Rev. Douglas Percy Winnifrith, Royal Army Chaplains' Department
- Bt. Col. William Robert Winter, Royal Army Service Corps
- Temp Lt. Kenneth A. Wolfe-Barry
- Capt. Norman Frederic Woodroffe, London Regiment
- Temp Maj. James Cowan Woods Royal Army Medical Corps
- Temp Capt. and Bt. Maj. Rickard John Woods
- Temp Maj. Sydney Winslow Woollett, Royal Army Medical Corps
- Temp Capt. Charles Earnshaw Woosnam, Royal Army Service Corps
- Maj. Reginald Worth Royal Army Medical Corps
- Temp Capt. Ernest Dixon Wortley, Royal Army Medical Corps
- Temp Lt.-Col. William Wrangham Royal Army Medical Corps
- Maj. Maurice Beresford Wright Royal Army Medical Corps
- Quartermaster and Maj. Stephen Wright MBE DCM Coldstream Guards
- Lt.-Col. John Railton Wyatt TD Dorsetshire Regiment
- Temp Maj. Charles Frederick Talbot Wyndhant Quin, Glam. Yeomanry
- Capt. Edward George Wynyard DSO Labour Corps
- Maj. Richard Darner Wynyard, East Surrey Regiment
- Temp Maj.-Walter Perceval Yetts, Royal Army Medical Corps
- Lt.-Col. William Alfred Youden TD Norfolk Regiment
- Maj. Richard Ashmur Blair Young, Army Pay Department
- Lt.-Col. John Henderson Younger, Argyll and Sutherland Highlanders
- Lt.-Col. John Robert Yourdi Royal Army Medical Corps

Canadian Forces

- Maj. David Lionel MacKenzie Baxter, Canadian Army Service Corps
- Lt.-Col. William Joseph Bentley MBE Canadian Army Dental Corps
- Lt.-Col. Claude Brown, Canadian Army Dental Corps
- Maj. Stanley Gordon Chown, Canadian Army Medical Corps
- Lt.-Col. Ernest Stanley Clifford DSO Canadian
- Lt.-Col. Cole Edward Cooper Cole, Canadian Army Medical Corps
- Capt. Edward Charles Complin, Ocean and Rail. Transport Department
- Capt. Robert Cecil Cowan, Canadian Forestry Corps
- Maj. Frederick Davy, Canadian Army Pay Corps
- Lt.-Col. Henry Charles Schomberg Elliot, Canadian Army Medical Corps
- Maj. James Pemberton Fell, Canadian Engineers
- Lt.-Col. Orland Kingsley Gibson MBE Canadian Dental Sec
- Maj. William Herbert Hewgill, Alberta Regiment
- Maj. Samuel John Huggins, 2nd Ontario Regiment
- Capt. William Clarence Inglis MBE Canadian Army Pay Corps
- Capt. John Logan Kappele, Canadian Army Dental Corps
- Maj. Thomas Reginald Ker, Quebec Regiment
- Rev John Knox, Canadian Army Chaplain Services
- Temp Lt.-Col. Owen Rickell Lobley MBE Canadian Army Pay Department
- Maj. Carson Alexander Vivian McCormack, Central Ontario Regiment
- Temp Capt. Gordon Leslie MacGillivray, Quebec Regiment
- Maj. Carlyle William Maclnnis, Alberta Regiment
- Lt.-Col. Daniel Sayre MacKay, Saskatchewan Regiment
- Maj. Thomas Roderick MacKenzie, Quebec Regiment
- Maj. Sir Andrew MacPhail, Canadian Army Medical Corps
- Lt.-Col. Charles Duncan McPherson, Saskatchewan Regiment
- Lt.-Col. Edward George Mason, Canadian Army Medical Corps
- Temp Lt.-Col. William Harcourt Milne, Canadian Forestry Corps
- Temp Capt. Kelson Charles Harley Monks, Canadian Engineers
- Maj. Charles Andrews Moorhead, Eastern Ontario Regiment
- Lt.-Col. William Harry Muirhead, Nova Scotia Regiment
- Maj. Arthur Egbert Myatt, Western Ontario Regiment
- Maj. Bayard Lamont Neiley, Canadian Army Dental Corps
- Quartermaster and Hon Capt. William James Nicholson, Canadian Machine Gun Corps
- Lt. John Wintour Robson, British Columbia Regiment
- Temp Maj. Frederick Charles Rush DSO New Brunswick Regiment
- Capt. John Percival Spanton, Canadian Forces
- Lt. Fred Spencer, Saskatchewan Regiment
- Temp Maj. Daniel Ernes Sprague, Canadian Forestry Corps
- Temp Maj. Albert Newton Stirrett MC Canadian Army Service Corps
- Temp Capt. Simon Marshall Tate, Western Ontario Regiment
- Temp Maj. Robert Broad well Thompson MBE Canadian Army Pay Corps
- Temp Capt. John James Thomson, Canadian Army Medical Corps
- Hon Maj. Sydney Jonathan Tinner
- Temp Maj. Thomas McTineaux Walker, Canadian Forestry Corps
- Rev David Victor Warner, Canadian Army Chaplain Services
- Maj. Edward Colpitts Weyman, Quebec Regiment
- Capt. Stanley Wharton, British Columbia Regiment
- Lt.-Col. David Alexander Whitton, Canadian Army Medical Corps
- Rev Thomas Augustine Wilson, Canadian Army Chaplain Services
- Lt.-Col. Robert Elmer Wodehouse, Canadian Army Medical Corps
- Lt. Mark Arthur Wolff, Manitoba Regiment

Australian Imperial Forces

- Capt. Hugh Gerner Brain MBE
- Maj. Alexander Cook, Royal Army Medical Corps
- Hon Maj. Francis Leopold Crane
- Lt.-Col. Charles Edgar Dennis, Australian Army Medical Corps
- Maj. Norman Maxwell Gibson, Australian Army Medical Corps
- Maj. Reginald Mack Gowing, Australian Army Ordnance Corps
- Lt.-Col. Cyril Tracy Griffiths CMG
- Lt.-Col. George Justice Hogben MBE
- Maj. Stanley Borwood Holder, Australian Army Pay Corps
- Maj. Charles Holmes Howard
- Lt.-Col. Alfred Jackson
- Maj. Lewis Wilmer Jeffrie DSO Australian Army Medical Corps
- Lt.-Col. Glen Alburn William James Knight, Australian Army Medical Corps
- Maj. John Macdonald, Australian Army Medical Corps
- Capt. William Henry Marshall, A.A.D.S
- Rev Frederick James Miles DSO Australian Army Chaplains' Department
- Lt.-Col. Alfred Moon CMG Australian Army Service Corps
- Maj. Frederick William Page, Australian Army Ordnance Corps
- Maj. Elliott Frank Playford, Australian Infantry
- Lt.-Col. Hugh Corbett Taylor-Young, Australian Army Medical Corps
- Maj. John Linton Treloar MBE
- Maj. Charles Percival Wilson, Australian Army Pay Corps
- Capt. Latham August Withall, Australian Engineers

New Zealand Forces

- Maj. Leopold George Dyke Acland MC NZ Army Service Corps
- Lt.-Col. Phillip Oywalk Andrew, NZ Medical Corps
- Maj. Charles Eric Andrews, NZ Staff Corps
- Maj. Cyril Victor Baigent NZ Medical Corps
- Maj. George Bertram Banks, NZ Staff Corps
- Lt.-Col. George Barclay VD NZ Engineers
- Lt.-Col. Henry Ferdinand Bernau, NZ Medical Corps
- Maj. Frederick Thompson Bowerbank NZ Medical Corps
- Maj. Edumand Harry Colbeck NZ Medical Corps
- Capt. David Eardley Fenwick NZ Medical Corps
- Maj. George Ernest Oswald Fenwick FRCS NZ Medical Corps
- Capt. Reginald Ronald Gow, Otago Regiment
- Lt.-Col. Alexander Wilson Hogg, NZ Medical Corps
- Capt. Gordon Hovey, Auckland Mounted Rifles
- Maj. Arnold Woodford Izard NZ Medical Corps
- Rev Archdeacon John Attwood Jacob, NZ Chaplains' Department
- Maj. William Kay, NZ Rifle Brigade
- Maj. Thomas Lawless, NZ Army Pay Corps
- Maj. Norman James Levien MBE NZ Army Ordnance Corps
- Lt.-Col. William Little, NZ Medical Corps
- Maj. Thomas McChristell, NZ Army Ordnance Corps
- Maj. Eric Lachlan Marchant, NZ Medical Corps
- Maj. John Mounsey, NZ Forces
- Maj. Neville Newcomb, NZ Forces
- Maj. Francis Edward Ostler, NZ Army Service Corps
- Maj. Henry Peacock, NZ Staff Corps
- Maj. Henry Percy Pickerill NZ Medical Corps
- Maj. William Henry Turnbuli, NZ Army Service Corps
- Maj. Francis Parnell Tymons, N.Z.D.C
- Capt. Herbert Horatio Spencer Westmacott, Auckland Regiment

South African Forces

- Temp Maj. William James Averre, SA Army Service Corps
- Maj. Harry Cecil Baker, SA Army Medical Corps
- Temp Maj. Harry Hyndman Balfour MBE SA Army Medical Corps
- Capt. Leonard Sydney Dacomb, British SA Police
- Temp Maj. Henry Douglas Daniels, SA Army Service Corps
- Maj. Robert Deane MBE SA Infantry
- Capt. John William George Fincham, Active Citizen Force
- Capt. Edward Thornton Fox, British SA Police
- Temp Lt.-Col. David Horwich, SA Army Medical Corps
- Capt. Richard Charles Lange, Active Citizen Force
- Temp Lt.-Col. Raymond Maxwell, SA Medical Corps
- Capt. Donald Menzies, SA Army Service Corps
- Maj. Francis Napier, SA Army Medical Corps
- Temp Lt.-Col. Herbert John Orford, SA Army Medical Corps
- Capt. Robert Derwent Parker, SA Army Medical Corps
- Maj. Arthur Llewellyn Pepper MC SA Reserve Brigade
- Capt. William James Phillips, British SA Police
- Temp Lt.-Col. Charles Porter, SA Army Medical Corps
- Maj. Alfred Edward Rann MBE MC SA Heavy Artillery
- Maj. James Charles Alexander Rigby SA Army Medical Corps
- Temp Maj. Alfred James Selick, Active Citizen Force
- Maj. Charles George Trevett, SA Army Service Corps
- Capt. Martinus Johannes Wolmarans, Permanent Force (Staff)

Newfoundland Forces

- Lt. George Michael Emerson, Royal Newfoundland Regiment
- Capt. William Howe Greene, Royal Newfoundland Regiment
- Maj. James St. Pierre Knight, Royal Newfoundland Regiment
- Maj. Liamont Patterson Royal Newfoundland Regiment
- Maj. Henry A. Timewell, Overseas Forces, Royal Newfoundland Regiment
- Lt. Gerald Joseph Whitty MC Royal Newfoundland Regiment

=== Civil Division ===
==== British India ====
- Khan Bahadur Kazi Aziz-ud-Din Ahmad ISO Judicial Secretary, Dholpur State, Rajputana
- Maulvi Nizam-ud-Din Ahmad, Nawab Nizamat Jang Bahadur, Political Secretary to His Exalted Highness the Nizams Government, Hyderabad, (Deccan)
- Wilfrid Alder, Indian Civil Service, Accountant-General and Commissioner of Issue of Paper Currency, Cawnpore, United Provinces
- Arthur Campbell Armstrong, District Superintendent of Police, Buldana, Berar, Central Provinces
- Satish Chandra Banerji, Deputy Superintendent of Police on Staff of Director, Central Intelligence, Bengal
- Albert Alfred Barnard, Inspector of Munitions, Pare, Bombay
- Sybil Barton, Joint Honorary Secretary, St. John Ambulance Association, Bangalore, Mysore State
- Lt.-Col., Edward Charles Bayley CIE Indian Army, Private Secretary to the Lieutenant-Governor of the Punjab
- Evelyn Mary Bell, Red Cross Bureau, Simla, Punjab
- Edward Henry Berthpud, India Civil Service Deputy Commissioner, Hazaribagh, Bihar and Orissa
- Lt.-Col. Sambhaji Rap Bhonsle, Commanding 3rd Gwalior Lancers
- Edward Arthur Henry Blunt, Indian Civil-Service, Director of Civil Supplies, Cawnpore, United Provinces
- Charles William Charteris Carson, Accountant-General, Bombay
- Frederick Francis Ralph Channer, Deputy Conservator of Forests, United Provinces
- Maj. John Clayton Coldstream, Indian Army, Secretary, Central Employment and Labour Bureau
- Henry Moore Annesley Cooke, Mysore State
- May Cross-Barratt, President, Silver Wedding Fund-Branch, Bangalore, Mysore State
- Maj. Charles Gilbert Crosthwaite, Indian Army, Deputy Commissioner, Bannu, North-West Frontier Province
- Edgar George Dixon, Secretary, Messrs. Turner, Morrison and Co., Calcutta, Bengal
- Duncan Donald, Superintendent of Police, Punjab
- Houston Duncan, Superintendent of Transportation, Bengal-Nagpur Railway Company, Bengal
- Ethel Duval, National Indian War Work Association, Bengal
- Thomas Peter Ellis, Indian Civil Service, Legal Remembrancer to the Government of the Punjab
- Cecil Henry Elmesy Officiating Health Officer, Port of Calcutta, Bengal
- Lewis Leigh Fermor Superintendent, Geological Survey of India
- May Fowler, Vice-President of the Sind Women's Branch, of the Imperial War Relief Fund, Bombay
- John Hugh Ronald Fraser, Indian Civil Service, Deputy Commissioner, Hazara, North-West Frontier Province
- Maj. William Best Greig, Indian Army (retired), Divisional Recruiting Officer, Delhi
- Francis Charles Griffith, Acting Commissioner of Police, Bombay
- The Reverend Canon Edward Guilford, Church Missionary Society, President of the Tarn Taran Municipality, Amritear District, Punjab
- Ashoke Chandra Gupta, Deputy Controller of War Accounts
- Seth Bandeali Hajibhoy, Burhanpur, Nimar District, Central Provinces
- Maj. Clayton Alexander Francis Kingston, Indian Medical Service, Personal Assistant to the Surgeon-General with the Government of Madras
- Kate Evans, Lady Hudson, Ladies Work Party, Simla-Delhi
- Charles Innes, Public Works Department, Executive Engineer, Tavoy Division, Burma
- Samuel Jackson, Superintending Chemist, Buckingham and Carnatic Mills, Madras
- Rai Bahadur Onkar Mull Jatia, Calcutta, Bengal
- Mary Eliot Johnson, Red Cross Association, Bangalore, Mysore State
- Dr. James Glansey Johnstone, Lingah, Persian Gulf
- Naw-ati Abdul Rahim Khan, Chief of Pathari Central India
- Khan i Bahadur Mir Ghulam Mahomed Khan of Talpui, Sind, Bombay
- Sahibzada Muhammad Jafar Ali Khan, of Maler Kotla, Punjab
- Rai Bahadur Seth Sufli Lai Karnani of Sirsa, Punjab
- Capt. Guy Talbot Lemon, Indian Army Reserve of Officers, Deputy Assistant Direct, General of Military Works, Army Headquarters
- Samuel Lupton, Editor, The Daily Gazette, Karachi, Sind, Bombay
- Charles Michael Lyons, Burma
- James Wallace Macfarlane, Deputy Controller (Hides), Bombay
- Maj. Duncan Iver Macpherson, Indian Army, Commandant, Military Police Battalion, Bengal
- Samuel Fitzgerald Madden, Vice-Principal, Mayo College, Ajmer, Rajputana
- Lady Chihubhai Madhavlal, widow of Sir Chinubhai Madhavlal, Baronet, of Ahmedabad, Bombay
- Maude Maude, Red Cross Association, Bihjar and Orissa
- Maj. William Charles Waimer Miller, Indian Army Reserve of Officers, Public Works Department, late Assistant Recruiting Officer, Shahpur, Punjab
- Rao Bahadur Seth Goverdhandas Motilal Mohatta, Sind, Bombay
- Hilda Mary Moncrieff Smith, Indian Comforts for the Troops Fund, Simla and Delhi
- Adam Wilson Moodie, Deputy Conservator of Forests Katha Division, Burma
- Violet Murray, Honorary Superintendent of the Burma Red Cross Depot
- Charles Stanley Garland Mylrea, American Mission, Koweit, Persian Gulf
- Herbert Edgar Whitehead O'Brian, Field Disbursing Officer (British Troops), Office of the Field Controller of Military Accounts, Poona
- Lt.-Col. Eugene John O'Meara, Indian Medical Service, Principal, Medical School, Agra, United Provinces
- Ernest Oughton, Baluchistan Chrome Company, Baluchistan
- Rai Sahib Mathura Pershad, Proprietor, The Central Provinces War News, Chhindwara, Central Provinces
- William Wallace Powell, Indian Civil Service, Assistant Commissioner, Pind Dad an Khan, Punjab
- Kunwar Jagdish Prasad, Indian Civil Service, Magistrate and Collector, Shahjahanpur, United Provinces
- Lt.-Col. Abdul Qayum, Khan Bahadur, Commanding Bhopal Victoria Lancers, Bhopal
- Alexander Murray Reith, Deputy Secretary, War Purposes Board, Bombay
- Frances Maud, Lady Richards, Red Cross and Comforts for the Troops Associations, Allahabad, United Provinces
- George Alexander Richardson, Assistant Resident, Aden
- Alice Richmond, Red Cross Association, Madras
- Lt.-Col. Montgomery Browne Roberts (Indian Army, retired), 39th Garhwal Rifles, United Provinces
- Stuart Duncan Robertson, District Traffic Superintendent, Operative, Great Indian Peninsula Railway, Bombay
- Rai Bahadur Ram Sarup, of Pilibhit, United Provinces
- Sardar Bahadur Bhai Arjan Singh, of Bagrian, Ludhiana District, Punjab
- Diwan Chet Singh, Honorary Magistrate of Paxna in the Agra District, United Provinces
- Rai Bahadur Thakur Dhonkal Singh, of Gorao, Jodhpur State, Rajputana
- Capt. Sardar Gopal Singh, Member of the Legislative Council of the Punjab
- Kanwar Raghbir Singh, Provincial Civil Service, Extra Assistant Commissioner, Moga, Punjab
- Raja Raghuraj Singh, of Mankapur, United Provinces
- Lt.-Col. Ram Singh, Commanding Navanagar Lancers
- The Honourable Christina Philippa Agnes Spence, Ladies Work Party Simla, Delhi
- Capt. Leonard Cording Stevens, Royal Field Artillery Central Publicity aboard, India
- Norman Cecil Stiffe, Indian Civil Service, Magistrate and Collector, Cawnpore, United Provinces
- George Frederick Stoddart, late Manager, New Glencoe Tea Estate, Jalpaiguri, Bengal
- William Fitzroy Scudamore Stallard Symes, Electrical Engineer, Delhi, Punjab
- Ernest William Tomkins, Superintendent of Police, Peshawar, North-West Frontier Province
- Hugh Kennedy Trevaskis, Indian Civil Service, Assistant Commissioner, Ambala, Punjab
- Thomas Aubrey Voice, Superintendent, Public Debt Office, Calcutta
- Walter Granville Warburton, Deputy Coal Controller, Bombay
- Lt. William Robert Ward, Commandant, Sarhad Levy Corps, Baluchistan
- Andrew Williamson, Madras and Southern Mahratta Railway, Chief Recruiting Officer
- Maj. Lennard Francis George Stovin Wylde, Indian Army, Controller of Military Accounts, 3rd (Lahore) Division

==== Dominion of New Zealand ====
- Thomas Noel Brodrick, for services as Under-Secretary of the New Zealand Lands and Survey Department
- Frederick James Burgess, Stipendiary Magistrate, for services as a Member of a Military Service Board
- James Burnett
- Donald George Clark, for services as Commissioner of the Land and Income Tax Department
- The Right Reverend Henry William Cleary Roman Catholic Bishop of Oxford, for services as Chaplain to the New Zealand Expeditionary Force
- Daniel George Arthur Cooper, Stipendiary Magistrate, for services as a Member of a Military Service Board
- Victor Grace Day, Stipendiary Magistrate for services as a Member of a Military Service Board
- Frederick Earl, Stipendiary Magistrate, for services as a Member of a Military Service Board
- James Sim Evans, Stipendiary Magistrate, for services in connection with a Military Service Board
- George Cox Fache, Commissioner of Pensions, for services in connection with War Pensions
- Frederick Chandos Courtenay Fell, for services in connection with patriotic organisations
- James Findlay, for services as Chairman of the Overseas Shipowners' Committee, Wellington
- Malcolm Fraser, for services as Government Statistician
- James Hislop, for services as Under-Secretary of the Department of Internal Affairs, the Department in charge of War Funds
- William Barr Montgomery, for services as Comptroller of Customs
- Thomas Moss, for services as a Member of the National Efficiency Board
- Vera Anita Myers, for services as Head of the Voluntary Staff at the Base Records Office, New Zealand
- John William Poynton, Stipendiary Magistrate, for services in connection with a Military Service Board
- George Edward Rhodes, for services in connection with the New Zealand Branch of the British Red Cross Society and Order of St. John of Jerusalem
- Thomas Sheriff Ronaldson, Assistant Public Trustee, for service as Chairman of the Financial Assistance Board
- The Reverend William Shirer, Senior Presbyterian Chaplain to the New Zealand Military Forces
- Guy Hardy Scholefield
- George Shirtcliffe, for services in connection with the New Zealand Branch of the British Red Cross Society and Order of St. John of Jerusalem
- The Right Reverend Thomas Henry Sprott Anglican Bishop of Wellington, for services in connection with the selection and allocation of Chaplains to the New Zealand Expeditionary Force
- King Topia, High Chief of the Wanganui and Tuwharotoa Tribes, for services in connection with recruiting and in securing land for returned Māori soldiers
- Thomas Wilson, for services in connection with the Financial Assistance Board

==== Union of South Africa ====
- Deputy Commissioner George Stephen Beer, South African Police
- George Ernest Birch, Chief Clerk, Governor-General's Office
- Paul Dudley Bray, Collector of Customs, Durban
- Paul Dietrich Cluver MBE Mayor of Stellenbosch
- Herbert Sutton Cooke, for services in connection with the recruiting of the South African Native Labour Corps
- Jean Crichton Cullen, Honorary Secretary, Red Cross Sub-Committee of the South African Hospital and Comforts Fund
- Richard Court Dent, Chairman of the Wool Advisory Committee, East London
- Eveline Mary Duquemin MBE Vice-Chairrnan of the Johannesburg Local Committee of the Governor-General's Fund
- William Francis Earle, Chairman of the Wool Advisory Committee, Durban
- John Fairbairn MBE Honorary Secretary, Red Cross of South Africa
- Bertha Helen Frood, Chairman of the Personal Service Committee of the South African Hospital and Comforts Fund
- Deputy Commissioner Richard Shearman Godley, South African Police
- Deputy Commissioner George Douglas Gray, South African Police
- Mary Augusta Mathers, for services at South African Work Rooms in London
- Charles Cecil Miller, Collector of Customs, Cape Town
- Lieutenant-Colonel Charles Frederick Kennan Murray for services as District Brigade Surgeon, St. John's Ambulance, Cape Town
- Major Thomas Leslie O'Reilly, Military Magistrate of Omarura, South West Protectorate
- Professor John Orr, for services to the Johannesburg Disabled Soldiers Board
- Willie Rockey, Member of the House of Assembly, for services to the Johannesburg Disabled Soldiers Board
- Frederick Rowland MBE Honorary Secretary, Red Cross, Johannesburg
- Emma Jane Searle MBE for Red Cross work
- Lewis Serecold Skeels, Deputy Controller of Imports and Exports
- James Sommerville, for services in connection with the settlement of returned soldiers
- Percy Henry Taylor MBE ex-Mayor of Pietermatitzburg
- Leo Weinthal, Chairman and Honorary Organiser of the " African World" War Comforts Service
- Charles Winser MBE Honorary Secretary, Red Cross, Durban
- Deputy Commissioner Thomas Joseph Wynne, South African Police

==== Newfoundland ====
- Charles Henry Hutchings KC Inspector-General of Constabulary
- Francis Joseph Morris KC for services as Chairman of the Recruiting Committee
- Rachael Fannie Parsons, for services on behalf of the Women's Patriotic Association
- Ann Roper, for services on behalf of the Women's Patriotic Association
- Robert Thomas Squarey, for services in connection with recruiting and the care of returning parties of soldiers
- Patrick Joseph Summers KC Deputy Minister of Justice, Secretary of the Military Service Board

==== Crown Colonies, Protectorates, Etc. ====
- Constance Angel, Lady Allardyce, for services in connection with War Charities in the Bahama Islands
- Francesco Azzopardi, Unofficial Member of the Executive Council and President of the Wheat Board, Malta
- Major Charles James Bagenal, Political Officer, Tabora, German East Africa
- Major Denis Lynch Baines, Political Officer, Bukoba, German East Africa
- William Chamberlain, Assistant Secretary, Royal Colonial Institute
- Philip Ward Cooper, Provincial Commissioner, Uganda, for services in recruiting and organisation of carriers
- John Rowland Crook, Government Engineer, and Chief Assistant Cable Censor, Gibraltar
- Eu Tong Sen, Unofficial Member of the Federal Council, Federated Malay States
- Francis Goodwin Gosling, Assistant Colonial Secretary, Bermuda, for services in connection with Red Cross and other war funds
- Izy Constance, Lady Haddon-Smith, for services in connection with Red Cross and other war charities, Windward Islands
- Charles Henry Harper, Chief Assistant Colonial Secretary, Gold Coast
- Sydney ThMwall Harrison CMG Comptroller of Customs, Barbados, for services as Reporting Officer
- Edward Vincent Hemmant, District Commissioner, East Africa Protectorate, for general administrative services and the supply of recruits and carriers
- Herbert Keys Hillyer, Secretary Colombo Port Commission, for services in connection with, war charities
- Joseph Howard, for general war services in Malta
- Malcolm Ludlow Jones, Chief Clerk, Oversea Settlement Office
- William Gemmell Kay, Unofficial Member of the Legislative Council, Trinidad, for services to the Priority Authority and other war work
- Godfrey James King, Civil Commissioner, Salisbury, Rhodesia, for services as Censor
- James Lochhead MBE Surgeon, Colonial Hospital, Gibraltar
- James Challenor Lynch, Member of the Legislative Council, and Member of the Recruiting Committee, Barbados
- Celia Macdonald of the Isles, for services to the Overseas Forces
- Ranald McDonald, Comptroller of Customs, Nyasaland Protectorate
- Commander Duncan Charles Macintyre, MBE RNR Harbour Master, Penang, Straits Settlements
- Hugh McLelland, Unofficial Member of the Legislative Council, Trinidad, and Mayor of San Fernando
- Arthur William Mahaffy, Administrator of Dominica
- Edward Gilbert Morris, District Commissioner, Uganda Protectorate, for services in organising levies, carriers, and supplies
- Alfredo Parnis one of His Majesty's Judges for the Island of Malta
- Elizabeth Miller Phillips, for services as Honorary Secretary, Trinidad and Tobago Branch of the Red Cross Fund
- Ratu Joni Antonio Rabici, Native Member of the Legislative Council and Roko of Cakaudrove Province, Fiji
- Lieutenant-Colonel Charles Edward Daliel Oldham Rew, Officer Commanding the British Forces and Senior Political Officer, Togoland
- Captain Stanley Rivers-Smith, Director of Education, Zanzibar Protectorate, for services in recruiting and organisation of carriers
- John Argyll Robertson, Manager of the Chartered Bank, Kuala Lumpur, for services in connection with finance and war charities, Malay States
- Thomas Roy, General Manager of the Shire Highlands Railway
- The Reverend Alfred Barrett Sackett, Temporary Chaplain to the Forces, for services in connection with the "Welcome Home," Gibraltar
- Frederick Emelius Scott, Mayor of Port of Spain, Trinidad, for services in connection with recruiting and other war work
- Paymaster-Commander Alan Edward Stack RN Assistant Secretary to the Administration, German East Africa
- Robert Walter Taylor, Treasurer, Somaliland Protectorate, for services as Chief Cable Censor and in connection with recruiting
- Thomas Shenton Whitelegge Thomas, Assistant Chief Secretary, Uganda, for Avar services in the East Africa Protectorate
- Major Osmund Tpnks, Commanding Ceylon Supply and Transport Section, for services to troops passing through Ceylon
- Antonio Cassar Torreggiani MBE Officer-in Charge of the Flour Control, Malta
- The Honourable Dorothy Marguerite Elizabeth Trefusis, for work in connection with war charities and recruiting in Jamaica
- Eubule John Waddington, Assistant
- District Commissioner, East Africa Protectorate, for services in recruiting askaris and carriers
- The Right Reverend John Jamieson Willis Bishop of Uganda, for valuable assistance throughout the period of hostilities

==== Honorary Officers ====
- Sheikh Abubakari bin Ali, Liwali of Vanga
- Sheikh Ahmed bin Sud, Acting Liwali of Lamu

== See also ==
- 1919 Birthday Honours - Full list of awards.
