= Hodder & Stoughton =

British publisher

- Parent company: Hachette
- Status: Active
- Founded: 1868; 158 years ago
- Founder: Matthew Henry Hodder; Thomas Wilberforce Stoughton
- Country of origin: United Kingdom
- Headquarters location: London, England
- Imprints: Hodder & Stoughton, Coronet, Hodder Faith, John Murray, Mulholland, Quercus, Saltyard, Sceptre, Two Roads, Hodderscape
- Official website: hodder.co.uk

Hodder & Stoughton is a British publishing house, now an imprint of Hachette.

== History ==
=== Early history ===
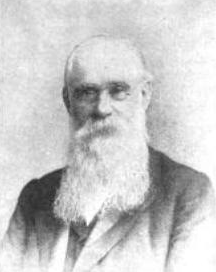
Matthew Hodder

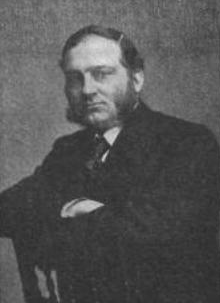
Thomas Wilberforce Stoughton

The firm has its origins in the 1840s, with Matthew Hodder's employment, aged 14, with Messrs Jackson and Walford, the official publisher for the Congregational Union. In 1861 the firm became Jackson, Walford and Hodder; but in 1868 Jackson and Walford retired, and Thomas Wilberforce Stoughton joined the firm, creating Hodder & Stoughton.

Hodder & Stoughton published both religious and secular works, and its religious list contained some progressive titles. These included George Adam Smith's Isaiah for its Expositor’s Bible series, which was one of the earliest texts to identify multiple authorship in the Book of Isaiah. There was also a sympathetic Life of St Francis by Paul Sabatier, a French Protestant pastor. Matthew Hodder made frequent visits to North America, meeting with the Moody Press and making links with Scribners and Fleming H. Revell.

The secular list only gradually accepted fiction, and it was still subject to "moral censorship" in the early part of the 20th century. Matthew Hodder was doubtful about the Rubaiyat of Omar Khayyam, and the company refused Michael Arlen's The Green Hat, a novel published by Collins in 1924. In 1922, Hodder and Stoughton published an edition of Lewis Carroll's Alice's Adventures in Wonderland.

The 1920s brought an explosion of commercial fiction at keen prices – Hodder's "Yellow Jackets" series were the precursors of the first paperbacks, and included bestsellers from John Buchan, Edgar Wallace, Dornford Yates and Sapper's Bulldog Drummond. In 1928, the company became the exclusive British hardback publisher of Leslie Charteris's adventure novel series, The Saint, publishing all 50 UK first editions of the series until 1983. In this decade they also took over ownership of the medical journal The Lancet.

By 1938, their authors included Eleanor Acland (published posthumously), Harold Spencer Jones, Stanley Baldwin, J. M. Barrie, missionaries Mildred Cable and Francesca French, Reginald Campbell, Gordon Campbell, Lord Edward Cecil (published posthumously), William Macneile Dixon, Attilio Gatti, Alain Gerbault, Wilfred Grenfell, Edward Grey, Lord Frederick Hamilton, James Hilton (Goodbye, Mr. Chips), Ronald Kaulback, Oliver Lodge, Abe Mitchell, J. E. B. Seely, Frederick O'Brien, Hugh Ruttledge, James Maurice Scott, Frank Smythe, Howard Somervell, H. Taprell Dorling and Horace Annesley Vachell.

From 1938, Hodder & Stoughton were also the originators of the Teach Yourself line of self-instruction books, which are still published through Hodder Headline's educational division. As the company expanded at home and overseas, Hodder & Stoughton's list swelled to include the real-life adventures in Peary's North Pole and several works by Winston Churchill.

During the war, Ralph Hodder Williams set up the Brockhampton Book Co. to sell off overstocks of theological works. The manager, Ernest Roker, had an interest in children's books and managed to persuade author Enid Blyton to write a series of books for them about four children and a dog. In 1942, the Famous Five series was born with Five on a Treasure Island. In 1962, Brockhampton took over the children's writer Elinor Lyon, whose novels the parent company had introduced in 1948.

Hodder & Stoughton also published the Biggles books by Captain W. E. Johns, after he moved publishers from the Oxford University Press during the Second World War. Hodder & Stoughton published their first original Biggles book in 1942 with Biggles Sweeps the Desert around September/October of that year (they had previously published a reprint of Biggles Flies East in May 1942) and the Brockhampton Press published Johns' Gimlet books from 1947. From 1953, Brockhampton Press would also publish Biggles books, alternating with Hodder & Stoughton and Captain W. E. Johns remained with them until his death in 1968, with the last Hodder & Stoughton Biggles book appearing in August 1965 and the last Brockhampton Press Biggles book appearing in July 1970. Hodder & Stoughton also published some of Johns' Worrals books. Hodder & Stoughton eventually published 35 Biggles first editions and Brockhampton Press published a further 29 Biggles first editions.

=== Post-war years ===
In 1953 they published Sir John Hunt's successful The Ascent of Everest, and began their long association with thriller writer John Creasey. In the 1970s, they brought the Knight and Coronet imprints into common use. The latter is particularly memorable for David Niven's much-celebrated autobiography The Moon's a Balloon.

In the 1960s the Hodder and Stoughton fiction list broadened to include many quality commercial authors, including Mary Stewart whose works included Madam, Will You Talk? and sold millions of copies worldwide. The non-fiction publishing included Anthony Sampson's era-defining The Anatomy of Britain in 1962. Another notable title in the children's sphere was the 1969 Brockhampton Press publication of Asterix the Gaul by Goscinny and Uderzo. In 1967, Hodder and Stoughton sold its Canadian publisher, the Musson Book Company, to General Publishing.

In 1974, John le Carré’s Tinker, Tailor, Soldier, Spy was published to much critical acclaim, earning him a Literary Guild Choice. The following year, previous employee John Attenborough published A Living Memory of Hodder. In 1981, the company acquired the New English Library, an imprint created by the American Times Mirror Company that published works from several genres including fantasy, science fiction and suspense and included books by James Herbert and Stephen King.

In 1986, Hodder & Stoughton introduced Sceptre as a literary imprint to sit alongside mass-market imprints Coronet and NEL. Originally publishing in paperback only, early books on the Sceptre list included Thomas Keneally’s Schindler's Ark which had won the Booker Prize in 1982. Hodder & Stoughton also won the Booker Prize in 1985 with the publication of Keri Hulme’s The Bone People, originally acquired from its New Zealand office.

Other notable books on the Hodder & Stoughton list in this decade include Rosamunde Pilcher’s The Shell Seekers, Elizabeth George’s A Great Deliverance and the first novel in Jean M. Auel’s prehistoric fiction series Earth’s Children® The Clan of the Cave Bear, which was an international success and the series, completed with the publication of The Land of Painted Caves in 2011, has sold more than 45 million copies worldwide.

In 1987, Hodder acquired the academic publisher Edward Arnold.

The Lancet was sold to Elsevier in 1991. In 1993, Headline bought Hodder & Stoughton and the company became a division of Hodder Headline Ltd. In 1997 Sceptre published Charles Frazier’s Cold Mountain and the following year Hodder & Stoughton released Sir Alex Ferguson’s much-lauded autobiography Managing My Life.

In 1999, Hodder Headline was acquired by W H Smith. Also in 1999, Hodder acquired the children's publisher Wayland Publishers from Wolters Kluwer.

=== 21st century ===
In 2002 Hodder Headline Ltd acquired John Murray and two years later Hodder Headline was bought by Hachette Livre, which already owned British publishers Orion and Octopus. When Hachette also acquired Time Warner Book Group (now Little, Brown) it became the UK’s lead publisher. The Hodder & Stoughton fiction list is now home to John Connolly, Jeffery Deaver, John Grisham, Sophie Hannah, Stephen King, Jodi Picoult, Peter Robinson and Robyn Young. The 2009 publication of David Nicholls’ One Day heralded another international success. David wrote the screenplay for the 2011 film adaptation, directed by Lone Scherfig and the book has sold more than two million copies worldwide.

On 7 July 2010 they released Stephen King's Under the Dome with four cover versions.

In 2012, Hodder Education sold its medical and higher education lines, including the remainder of Arnold, to Taylor & Francis.

In 2014, Hodder acquired the independent publisher Quercus.

In December 2023, Hodder & Stoughton revealed its new logo, featuring a stoat, reflecting the pronunciation of Stoughton's name.

== Imprints ==
- Coronet Books
- English Universities Press
- Firefly
- Flame - for young people
- Hodder Faith
- Hodder Moa Beckett (New Zealand)
- Hodder & Stoughton
- Hodder Children's Books
- Hodder Paperbacks Limited
- Knight Books
- John Murray
- Mulholland
- Quercus
- Sceptre
- Saltyard
- Two Roads
- Yellow Kite
- Hodderscape

== Book series ==
- The "Biggles" Books
- The Christian Evidence Society's Lectures
- Days With the Poets (At Least 19 titles - Mostly written by Mary Clarissa May Byron under various pseudonyms)
- Expositor's Bible
- The Famous Five
- Hodder & Stoughton Christian Classics
- Hodder & Stoughton Crown Octavo
- Hodder & Stoughton Demy Octavo
- Hodder & Stoughton Black Jackets
- Hodder & Stoughton 2/- Yellow Jackets
- Hodder & Stoughton 9d Yellow Jackets
- Hodder & Stoughton Yellow Jacket Service Editions
- The King's England
- A New Philosophical and Theological Library
- The Saint
- Teach Yourself Books
- The "Worrals" Books

== Notable publications ==
- 1883 Natural Law in the Spiritual World - Henry Drummund
- 1881 From Log-cabin to White House - William M. Thayer
- 1896 The Personal Life of Queen Victoria - Sarah Tooley
- 1911 Peter Pan and Wendy - J.M Barrie
- The Lord Kitchener Memorial Book (book about Herbert Kitchener, 1st Earl Kitchener) - Sir Hedley Le Bas (editor)
- 1919 Collected Verse - Rudyard Kipling
- 1927 Blind Corner - Dornford Yates
- 1934 Goodbye Mr Chips - James Hilton
- 1939 Oliver Cromwell - John Buchan
- 1942 The Queen's Book of the Red Cross
- 1942 Five on a Treasure Island - Enid Blyton
- 1942 Biggles Sweeps the Desert - Captain W. E. Johns
- 1944 Green Dolphin Country - Elizabeth Goudge
- 1952 The Colditz Story - P. R. Reid
- 1953 The Ascent of Everest - John Hunt
- 1954 Katharine - Anya Seton
- 1962 The IPCRESS File - Len Deighton
- 1962 The Anatomy of Britain - Anthony Sampson
- 1969 Asterix the Gaul - Goscinny and Uderzo
- 1970 Love Story - Erich Segal
- 1973 The Moon's a Balloon - David Niven
- 1974 Tinker, Tailor, Soldier, Spy - John le Carré
- 1980 The Clan of the Cave Bear - Jean M. Auel
- 1982 Schindler's Ark - Thomas Keneally
- 1985 The Bone People - Keri Hulme
- 1986 Bangladesh: A Legacy of Blood - Anthony Mascarenhas
- 1988 The Shell Seekers - Rosamund Pilcher
- 1988 A Great Deliverance - Elizabeth George
- 1997 Cold Mountain - Charles Frazier
- 1998 Managing My Life - Alex Ferguson
- 1998 The Ark of the People - W. J. Corbett, illustrated by Wayne Anderson
- 2001 The Eyre Affair - Jasper Fforde
- 2001 Saffy's Angel - Hilary McKay
- 2002 Kylie: La La La - Kylie Minogue & William Baker
- 2005 My Sister's Keeper - Jodi Picoult
- 2008 My Booky Wook - Russell Brand
- 2009 The Other Hand - Chris Cleave
- 2009 One Day - David Nicholls
- 2010 Under the Dome - Stephen King
- 2010 A Street Cat Named Bob - James Bowen
- 2011 The Land of Painted Caves - Jean Auel
- 2011 The Litigators - John Grisham
- 2014 Playing It My Way - Sachin Tendulkar
- 2015 The Long Way to a Small, Angry Planet - Becky Chambers
- 2016 100 Things Successful People Do - Nigel Cumberland
- 2019 The Blues Comes With Good News - Sonny Hall
- 2020 The Secret Life of a Vet - Rory Cowlam
- 2020 Beyond Possible: One Soldier, Fourteen Peaks - Nirmal Purja
- 2020 Billion Dollar Loser - Reeves Wiedeman

== Publications ==
=== Hodder Children's Books ===
- The Ark of the People (1998), written by W. J. Corbett, illustrated by Wayne Anderson

== See also ==
- List of largest UK book publishers
