= Incendiary =

Incendiary means "capable of causing fire". It may also refer to:

- Incendiary device, a device designed to cause fires
- Incendiary ammunition, a projectile designed to set fire to a target
- Incendiary (novel), a novel by Chris Cleave
- Incendiary (film), a 2008 film based on the Cleave novel
- Incendiary: The Willingham Case, a 2011 documentary film about the Cameron Todd Willingham arson murder case
- Incendiary (band), a hardcore punk band from Long Island, New York

== See also ==
- Arson, a crime of willfully and maliciously setting fire to or charring property
