= William Venning Glanville Hancock =

British Army officer (1892–1964)

William Venning Glanville Hancock OBE
- Born: 27 April 1892; Penzance, England
- Died: 8 February 1964 (aged 71); Penzance, England
- Military career
- Branch: British Army
- Rank: Major
- Awards: Order of the British Empire (OBE); Territorial War Medal

William Venning Glanville Hancock OBE (27 April 1892 – 8 February 1964) was an officer in the British Army.

Hancock was born on 27 April 1892 in Penzance, a town in Cornwall, England.

== Career ==
Hancock was commissioned into the Royal Garrison Artillery. He served in theatres in France and Belgium. He was made a captain on 3 February 1915 and subsequently a major. He received the British War Medal, Territorial Force War Medal, and Victory Medal. Hancock was mentioned in dispatches on 21 May 1918 and 7 July 1919. He was appointed an Officer of the Order of the British Empire (OBE) in the 1919 Birthday Honours.

He was subsequently employed by Barclays as a bank manager. With Hancock as treasurer of the Fowey Golf Club, Cornwall, they reported a "considerably improved financial situation due to more visitors using the links." He was a donor of the Fowey Cottage Hospital.
