= Yellow Kite =

Imprint of publisher Hodder & Stoughton

Yellow Kite is an imprint of Hodder & Stoughton, a British publishing house, now a division of Hachette.

== History ==
An imprint of Hodder and Stoughton, Yellow Kite was founded in 2013 by Liz Gough, and become one of the first ever lists dedicated to the health and well-being genre.

Yellow Kite began publishing in January 2014 and in its first year (Yellow Kite) had two Sunday Times Top Ten bestsellers: One Million Lovely Letters by Jodi Ann Bickley and Black Rainbow by Rachel Kelly. It also had a New York Times bestseller with David Perlmutter’s Grain Brain.

Publishing about a dozen non-fiction titles per year, its (stated) mission is to produce ‘books to help you live a good life’ covering inspirational self-help and memoir, mind, body and spirit, healthy eating, diet, nutrition, and practical personal development. In 2015, Yellow Kite published the biggest selling debut cookery book since records began – Deliciously Ella by healthy eating phenomena Ella Woodward. In 2016 Yellow Kite published Ella Woodward’s second book Deliciously Ella Every Day along with bestselling diet title The Sirtfood Diet and the debut book Keep It Real by Vogue Commissioning Editor and healthy eating "guru" Calgary Avansino. The publisher also has an online wellbeing festival, which launched in 2015.
