= 1914–15 Star =

Campaign medal of the British Empire

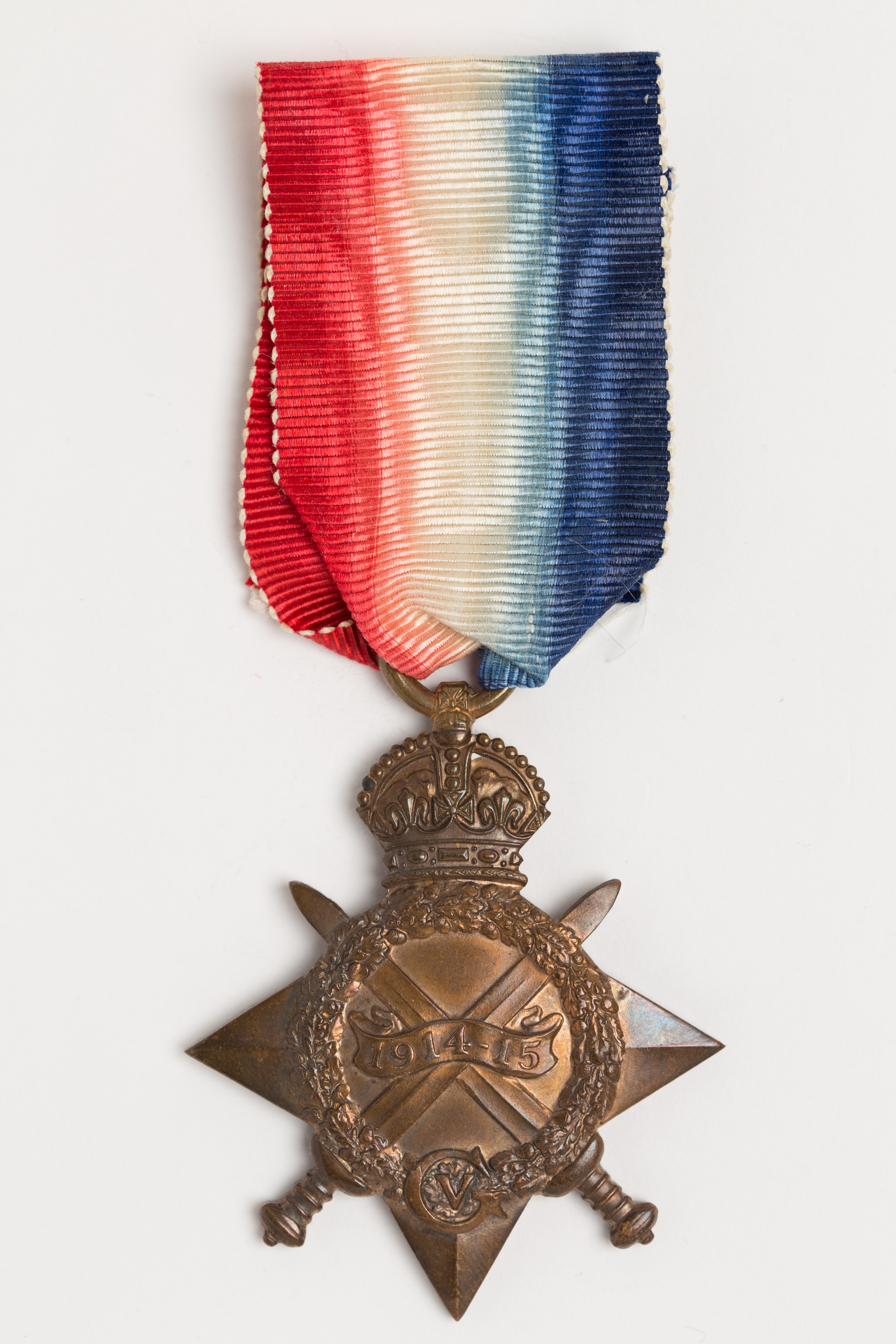
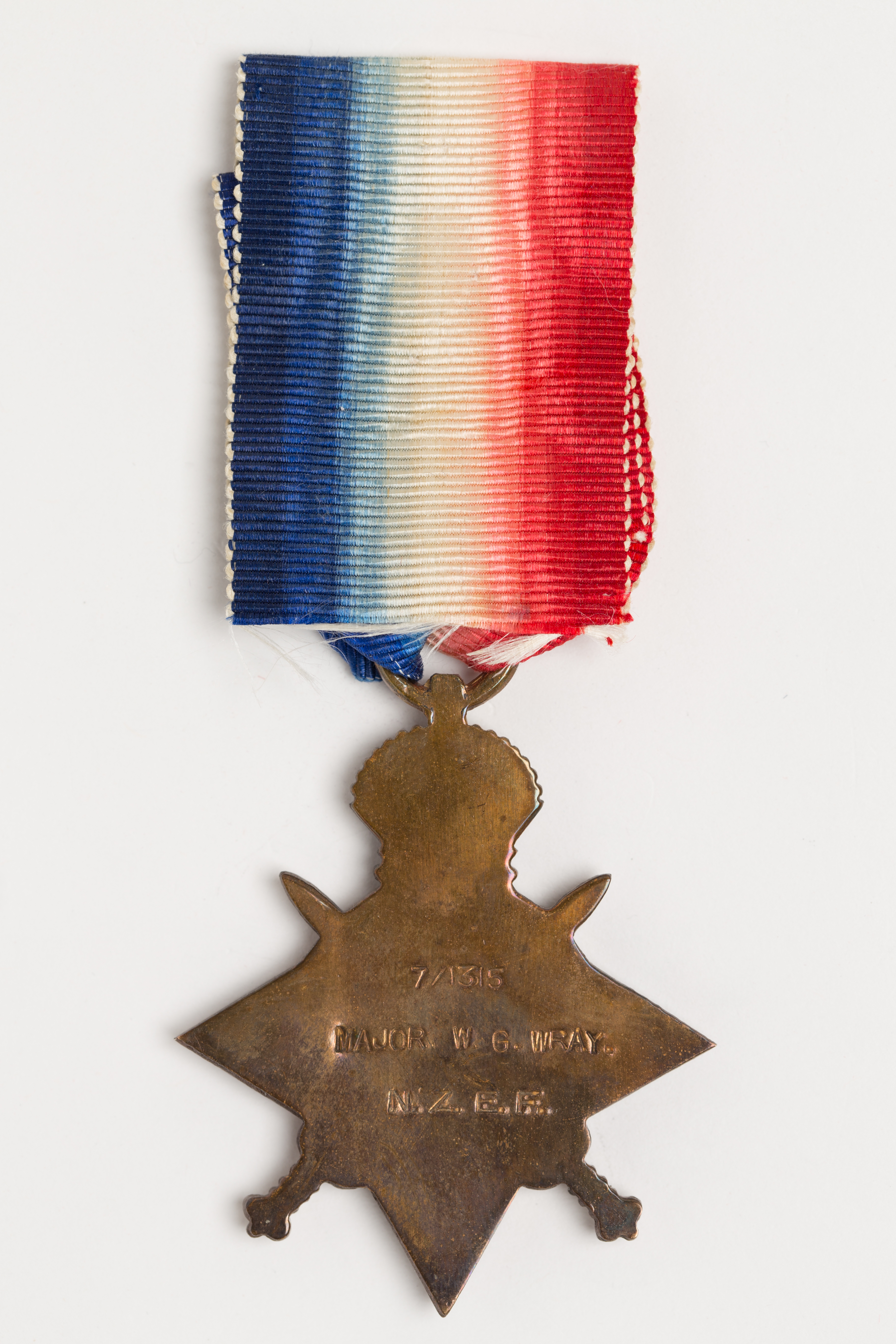
- Type: Campaign medal
- Awarded for: Campaign service
- Country: United Kingdom
- Presented by: the Monarch of the United Kingdom and the British Dominions, and Emperor of India
- Eligibility: British and Imperial forces
- Campaign: First World War
- Established: December 1918

Highlights
- Total: 2,366,000
- Ribbon bar

Order of wear
- Next (higher): 1914 Star
- Next (lower): British War Medal
- Related: 1914 Star; Africa General Service Medal; Khedive's Sudan Medal of 1910

The 1914–15 Star is a campaign medal of the British Empire which was awarded to all who served in the British and Imperial forces in any theatre of the First World War against the Central European Powers during 1914 and 1915. The medal was never awarded singly and recipients also received the British War Medal and Victory Medal.

== Institution ==
The 1914–15 Star was instituted in December 1918 and was awarded to all who served in the British and Imperial forces against the Central European Powers in any theatre of the Great War between 5 August 1914 and 31 December 1915, provided they had not already received the 1914 Star. The period of eligibility was prior to the Military Service Act 1916, which introduced conscription in Britain.

The creation of the 1914 Star for the original British Expeditionary Force, who served in France and Flanders up to November 1914, led to demands from the Australian and other dominion governments for medallic recognition for their original contingents who had fought at Gallipoli and elsewhere. This led to a proposed Gallipoli Star, for award to New Zealanders and Australians of the Australian and New Zealand Army Corps (ANZAC), but not to the British forces serving alongside them. Following protests by British parliamentarians and news media, the Gallipoli Star was never awarded and the 1914–15 Star, with its wider eligibility, instituted instead.

No clasp or bar to the medal was approved.

== Award criteria ==
To be eligible for the medal, a member must have served on the establishment of a unit in a theatre of war during the relevant dates of operations in that theatre.

Excluded from eligibility, were all those who had already qualified for the award of the 1914 Star, and those who received the Africa General Service Medal or the Khedive's Sudan Medal of 1910 for campaigns from 4 August 1914 to the end of 1915.

== Recipients ==
Some 2,366,000 medals were awarded to servicemen and supporting personnel of British military forces and the various forces of the British Dominions, India and the Colonies. (Members of the Mercantile Marine qualified only where serving under Royal Naval engagement, as a consequence of signing a T124x agreement.) This medal breakout included:

- 283,500 to the Royal Navy.
- 71,150 to Canadians.

Like the 1914 Star, the 1914–15 Star was never awarded singly and recipients were also awarded the British War Medal and Victory Medal. The only difference is that the later award bears '1914-15' on the central scroll instead of '1914'; the ribbon is the same. The three medals were sometimes irreverently referred to as Pip, Squeak and Wilfred after three comic strip characters, a dog, a penguin and a rabbit, which were popular in the immediate post-war era. Pip represented either of the two Stars, Squeak represented the British War Medal and Wilfred represented the Victory Medal.

== Description ==
The medal, based on the design of the earlier 1914 Star, is a four-pointed star of bright bronze, ensigned with a crown, with a height of 50 millimetres (62 millimetres with the ring suspension included) and a width of 44 millimetres. The medal and suspension assembly was struck in one piece.

Obverse

The obverse has two crossed gladii (swords) with their blades upwards, the points and grips of which form what might appear to be four additional points to the star. The swords are overlaid by a wreath of oak leaves, with the Royal Cypher of King George V at the base of the wreath and an overlaying central scroll inscribed "1914–15".

Reverse

The reverse is plain and is impressed with the recipient's number, rank and name.

Ribbon

The ribbon is 32 millimetres wide and has the red, white and blue colours of the flag of the United Kingdom in shaded and watered bands. The same ribbon was used for the 1914 Star.

== Order of wear ==
The order of wear of the First World War campaign stars and medals is as follows:

- The 1914 Star.
- The 1914–15 Star.
- The British War Medal.
- The Mercantile Marine War Medal.
- The Victory Medal (United Kingdom).
- The Territorial War Medal.

=== South Africa ===
On 6 April 1952 the Union of South Africa instituted its own range of military decorations and medals. These new awards were worn before all earlier British decorations and medals awarded to South Africans, with the exception of the Victoria Cross, which still took precedence before all other awards. Of the campaign medals awarded to South Africans, the 1914–15 Star takes precedence as shown below.

- Preceded by the Natal Native Rebellion Medal.
- Succeeded by the British War Medal.

== Bibliography ==
- Dorling, H. Taprell (1956). Ribbons and Medals. London: A.H.Baldwin & Sons. OCLC 930416375.
- Hayward; Birch; Bishop (2006). British Battles and Medals (7th ed.). London: Spink. ISBN 1-902040-77-5.
- Mussell, John, ed. (20 September 2014). Medal Yearbook 2015. Honiton, Devon: Token Publishing Ltd. p. 177. ISBN 978-1-908828-17-0.
- Williamson, Howard J. (2011). The Great War Medal Collectors Companion Volume I. privately published by Anne Williamson. ISBN 978-0-9527544-4-2. "The book includes: – Campaign Medals. Full history of each medal, including Army Orders, Army Council Instructions & award criteria."
