= 1914 Star =

- Obverse and reverse of the 1914 Star
- Type: Campaign medal
- Awarded for: Campaign service
- Country: United Kingdom
- Presented by: the Monarch of the United Kingdom and the British Dominions, and Emperor of India
- Eligibility: British, Indian and Canadian forces
- Campaigns: France and Belgium 1914
- Clasps: 5th AUG.–22nd NOV. 1914
- Established: April 1917

Highlights
- Total: 378,000
- Ribbon bar without and with rosette

Order of wear
- Next (higher): India General Service Medal (1909)
- Next (lower): 1914–15 Star
- Related: 1914–15 Star; British War Medal; Victory Medal; Territorial Force War Medal

The 1914 Star, colloquially known as the Mons Star, is a British First World War campaign medal for service in France or Belgium between 5 August and 22 November 1914.

== Institution ==
The 1914 Star was authorised under Special Army Order no. 350 in November 1917 and by an Admiralty Fleet Order in January 1918, for award to officers and men of the British and Indian Expeditionary Forces who served in France or Belgium between 5 August and midnight of 22–23 November 1914. The former date is the day after Britain's declaration of war against the Central Powers, and the closing date marks the end of the First Battle of Ypres.

Altogether 378,000 1914 Stars were awarded.

== Clasp ==
A "5th AUG.–22nd NOV. 1914" clasp was instituted in 1919, as published in Army Order no. 361 of 16 October 1919. The clasp, together with two small silver roses, was awarded to those who had served under fire or who had operated within range of enemy mobile artillery in France or Belgium during the period between 5 August and 22 November 1914. An order for 350,000 clasps to be manufactured was placed by the War Office. Approximately 145,000 to 150,000 clasps were issued, although the exact number is unknown since the clasp had to be claimed personally by the recipients, of whom a large number had either been demobilised from the army in early 1919 so were not receiving army orders and thus neglected to apply or had died in the intervening period. Those Army units and formations that were eligible were listed in the appendix to Army Order no. 361 of 16 October 1919.

Admiralty Fleet Order 4036 dated 17 December 1919 concludes with a similar list of formations in paragraph 6, albeit those that are not eligible and therefore do not qualify for the clasp. Paragraph 4 was explicit that 'clasps earned by deceased Officers and men will be issued to their Legatees or Next of Kin entitled to receive them'.

It was proposed that the clasp be automatically issued to the next of kin of the deceased, and this was approved by the Secretary of State for War on 17 July 1919. This was explicitly documented in the aforementioned Admiralty Fleet Order 4036, but was not in Army Order no. 361. Nonetheless, those fatalities whose next of kin were automatically issued a clasp by the War Office are denoted with a green letter "C" on the respective 1914 Star medal roll for their unit.

When the ribbon bar alone was worn, recipients of the clasp to the medal wore a small silver rosette button on the ribbon bar.

== Recipients ==
The 1914 Star was principally an Army award, although some Royal Navy personnel who served ashore at Antwerp during the qualifying period received the medal. A few women who served in France and Belgium as nurses or auxiliaries during the qualifying period were also awarded the medal, such as Beatrice Cutler.

The majority of recipients were officers and men of the pre-war British army, specifically the British Expeditionary Force, also known as the Old Contemptibles, who landed in France soon after the outbreak of the War and who took part in the Retreat from Mons, hence the medal's nickname "Mons Star". Approximately 1,000 were awarded to members of the Royal Flying Corps, of whom 300 received the clasp.

There were 160 awarded to members of the 2nd Canadian Stationary Hospital who served with the British Expeditionary Force, whose deployment commenced on 6 November 1914. A more significant quantity were awarded to the Indian Army contingent, comprising the I Corps (British India) and the Indian Cavalry Corps. A total of 11,487 were issued by the Admiralty, with 435 issued to the Royal Naval Air Service.

The 1914 Star was never awarded singly. Recipients also received the British War Medal and Victory Medal, but did not qualify for the very similar 1914–15 Star since no person could receive both Stars. The only difference is that the later award bears '1914–15' on the central scroll instead of '1914'; the ribbon is the same. These three medals, with either Star included, were sometimes irreverently referred to as "Pip, Squeak and Wilfred", after three comic strip characters, a dog, a penguin and a rabbit, which were popular in the immediate post-war era.

== Description ==
The medal is a four-pointed star of bright bronze, ensigned with a crown, with a height of 50 millimetres (2.0 in) (62 millimetres (2.4 in) with the ring suspension included) and a width of 44 millimetres (1.7 in). The medal and suspension assembly was struck in one piece.

Obverse

The obverse has two crossed gladii (swords) with their blades upwards, the points and hilts of which form what might appear to be four additional points to the star. The swords are overlaid by a wreath of oak leaves, with the Royal Cypher of George V at the base of the wreath and a central S-shaped scroll inscribed "AUG 1914 NOV".

Reverse

The reverse is plain and is impressed with the recipient's number, rank, name and regiment or unit.

Clasp

The clasp, inscribed "5th AUG.–22nd NOV. 1914", was struck in bronze and is 31 millimetres (1.2 in) wide and 5 millimetres (0.20 in) high, while the ribbon bar rosettes are in silver. The clasp was sewn onto the ribbon.

Ribbon

The ribbon is 32 millimetres (1.3 in) wide and has the red, white and blue colours of the flag of the United Kingdom in shaded and watered bands. The same ribbon was used for the 1914–15 Star.

== Order of wear ==
The order of wear of the First World War campaign stars and medals is as follows:

- The 1914 Star.
- The 1914–15 Star.
- The British War Medal.
- The Mercantile Marine War Medal.
- The Victory Medal.
- The Territorial War Medal.

== Bibliography ==
- Dorling, H. Taprell (1956). Ribbons and Medals. London: A.H.Baldwin & Sons. OCLC 930416375.
- Fevyer; Wilson (1995). The 1914 Star to the Royal Navy & Royal Marines. Uckfield: Naval & Military Press. ISBN 978-1-897632-34-5.
- Hampden, Gordon (1935). The War Office. London: Puttnam. p. 137. OCLC 464097374.
- Hayward; Birch; Bishop (2006). British Battles and Medals (7th ed.). London: Spink. ISBN 1-902040-77-5.
- Joslin; Litherland; Simpkin (1988). British Battles and Medals (6th ed.). London: Spink. ISBN 0-907605-25-7.
- Mussell, John, ed. (20 September 2014). Medal Yearbook 2015. Honiton, Devon: Token Publishing Ltd. p. 177. ISBN 978-1-908828-17-0.
- Williamson, Howard J. (2011). The Great War Medal Collectors Companion Volume I (1st ed.). privately published by Anne Williamson. ISBN 978-0-9527544-4-2. "The book includes: – Campaign Medals. Full history of each medal, including Army Orders, Army Council Instructions & award criteria."
- Williamson, Howard J. (2026). The 1914 Star to the BEF and Indian Forces. privately published by Anne Williamson.
