= Jackson and Walford =

British publisher

Jackson & Walford
- Company type: Private company
- Industry: Publishing
- Founder: Messrs. Jackson and Walford
- Defunct: 1868
- Fate: Became an imprint of Houder & Stoughton
- Headquarters: 18 St Paul's Churchyard and 27 Paternoster Row, London, England
- Area served: England and Wales
- Key people: Messrs. Jackson and Walford, Matthew Hodder, and Thomas Wilberforce Stoughton
- Services: Book Publisher
- Website: www.hodder.co.uk

Jackson and Walford, later known as Jackson, Walford, and Hodder was a British publishing firm based in London that was the predecessor of Hodder & Stoughton. The publishers with their successive name changes were one of many London publishers that operated around St. Paul's Churchyard and Paternoster Row.

== History ==
Jackson and Walford from 1861 was a London publishing firm and predecessor firm of Hodder & Stoughton. Situated at 18 St Paul's Churchyard and 27 Paternoster Row in 1871 (which was the former address of the later Ward & Co.).

They published the Congregational Year Books, which were the publications of the "Congregational Union of England and Wales, and the Confederated Societies."

Matthew Hodder apprenticed there from the age of fourteen and became a partner in 1861. Upon the retirement of Messrs. Jackson and Walford in 1868, Thomas Wilberforce Stoughton joined Hodder and the firm was renamed Hodder & Stoughton. The firm then published both religious and secular works and has survived into the present day as an imprint of Hodder Headline.
