= Hodder Faith =

UK publisher

- Parent company: Hodder & Stoughton
- Status: Active
- Founded: 1868
- Country of origin: United Kingdom
- Headquarters location: London, England
- Official website: http://www.hodderfaith.com/

Hodder & Stoughton was founded in 1868 as a Christian publisher. Today Hodder Faith is an imprint of Hodder & Stoughton, publishing the NIV Bible and a wide range of Christian books. Genres range from Christian lifestyle issues to popular theology and even some Christian fiction.

The NIV Bible is the world's most popular modern English translation.

Hodder Faith published the word-of-mouth phenomenon The Shack by Wm Paul Young in the UK in 2008. The book now has over 18 million copies in print worldwide and spent 70 weeks at number 1 in The New York Times bestseller list.

Hodder Faith authors include Rob Parsons, Philip Yancey, J.John, Richard Foster, Joyce Meyer, R.T. Kendall, Wm Paul Young, Timothy Keller, John Eldredge and Chief Rabbi Jonathan Sacks.

== Notable recent publications ==
- Prayer: Does it Make Any Difference? by Philip Yancey
- The Shack by Wm Paul Young
- The Great Partnership by Jonathan Sacks
- Life with God by Richard Foster
- Naked Spirituality and Why Did Jesus, Moses, the Buddha and Mohammed Cross the Road by Brian D. McLaren
- Red Letter Christianity by Shane Claiborne & Tony Campolo
- Beautiful Outlaw by John Eldredge
- The Manga Bible by Siku
- Cycling Home from Siberia by Rob Lilwall

== Notable backlist publications ==
- Celebration of Discipline and Prayer by Richard Foster
- Run Baby Run by Nicky Cruz
- Chasing the Dragon by Jackie Pullinger
- The Hiding Place by Corrie Ten Boom
- God's Smuggler by Brother Andrew (Andrew van der Bijl)
