= Macedonian Mule Corps =

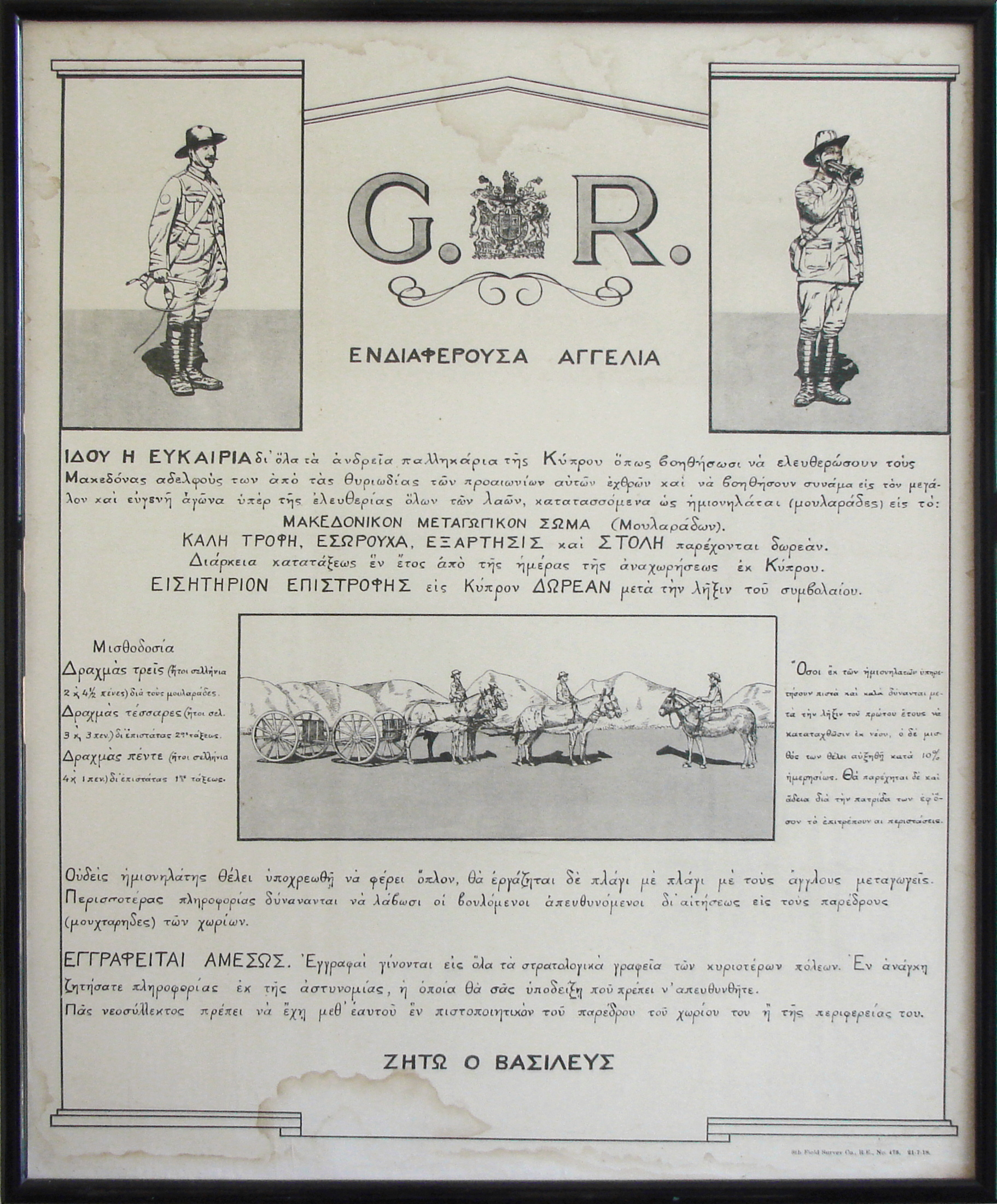
- Poster urging Cypriots to enlist in the Macedonian Mule Corps
- Active: 1916–1919
- Country: British Cyprus
- Allegiance: British Empire
- Branch: Army
- Role: Labour
- Size: 12,288
- Engagements: World War I Southern Russia intervention

The Macedonian Mule Corps (Greek: Μακεδονικόν Μεταγωγικόν Σώμα, romanized: Makedonikon Metagogikon Soma) was a formation of the British Salonika Army consisting primarily of Cypriot muleteers and their mules. The unit was established in 1916 and dissolved in March 1919. During its service it provided crucial logistical support to the Allied war effort on the Macedonian front and the Southern Russia intervention. 12,288 Cypriots served in the corps, 3,000 of whom received bronze British War Medals.

== Background ==
At the outbreak of the First World War, Cyprus was nominally a part of the Ottoman Empire, while in fact being administered by the British Empire, as agreed in the Cyprus Convention of 1878. On 5 November 1914, the Ottomans entered the conflict on the side of the Central Powers, prompting Britain to void the Cyprus Convention and annex the island, as the two states were now at war. A number of security measures, including telegraph censorship and martial law, were introduced, although Cyprus remained relatively isolated from the Macedonian front, Gallipoli Campaign, Sinai and Palestine Campaigns. As it did not possess harbors large enough to accommodate large warships, local authorities shifted their focus to supplying the fronts in its periphery with food, as well as housing those wounded in actions, prisoners of war as well as refugees.

During the course of the Crimean War (1853–1856), French merchants had acquired mules from the island for the French expeditionary force. By the time of the British occupation of the island, Cypriot mules had already cemented their reputation as both sturdy pack animals and an alternative to polo ponies. Cypriot mules were later purchased during the Greek army's mobilization of 1880, and during the Mahdist War by the British themselves, who also recruited local muleteers. Starting from the middle of the 1880s, Cypriot mules were exported to India. In 1902, 128 mules were dispatched to South Africa in support of the British forces fighting in the Second Boer War. In December 1910, the Cypriot Breeding Committee began importing horses and mules from the Middle East in order to improve the quality of the local breeds. British General Staff reports dating to 1907 and 1913 respectively described the Cypriot mules as particularly docile and adapted to mountain warfare.

== Service ==
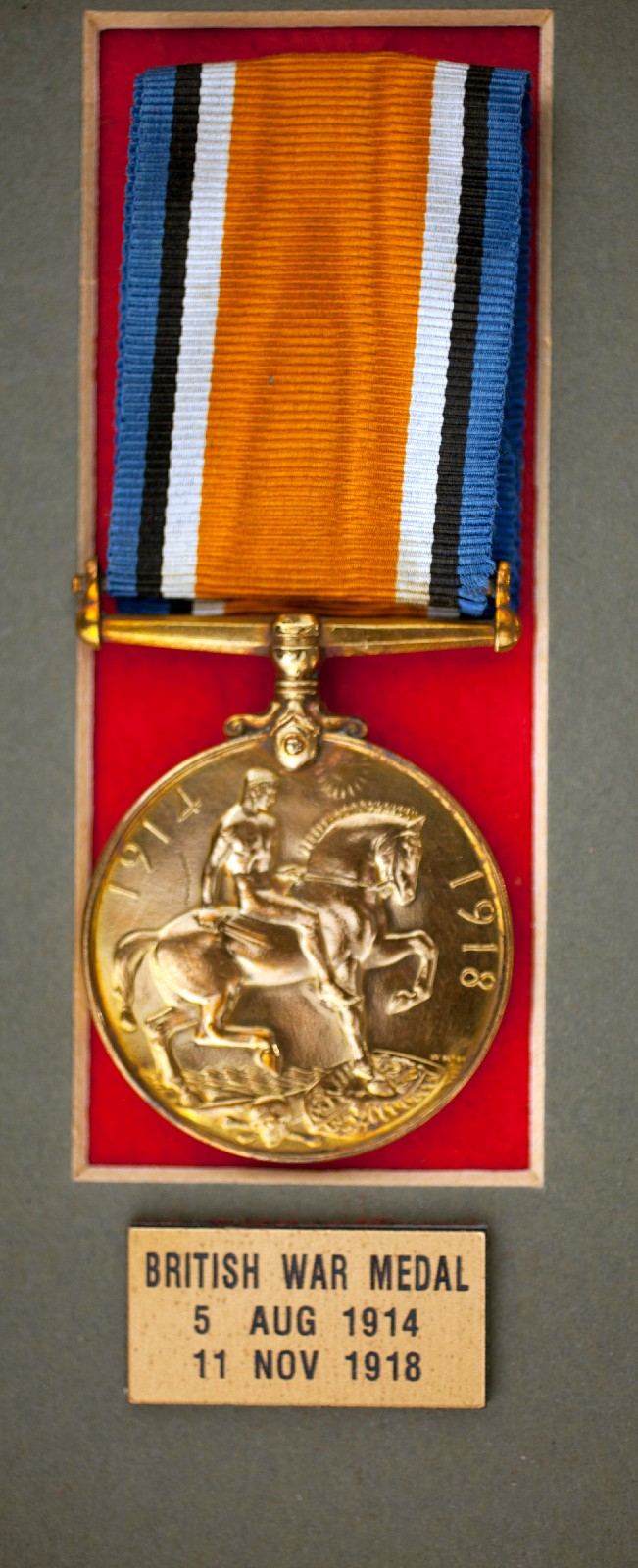
One of the British War Medals awarded to a veteran of the Macedonian Mule Corps.

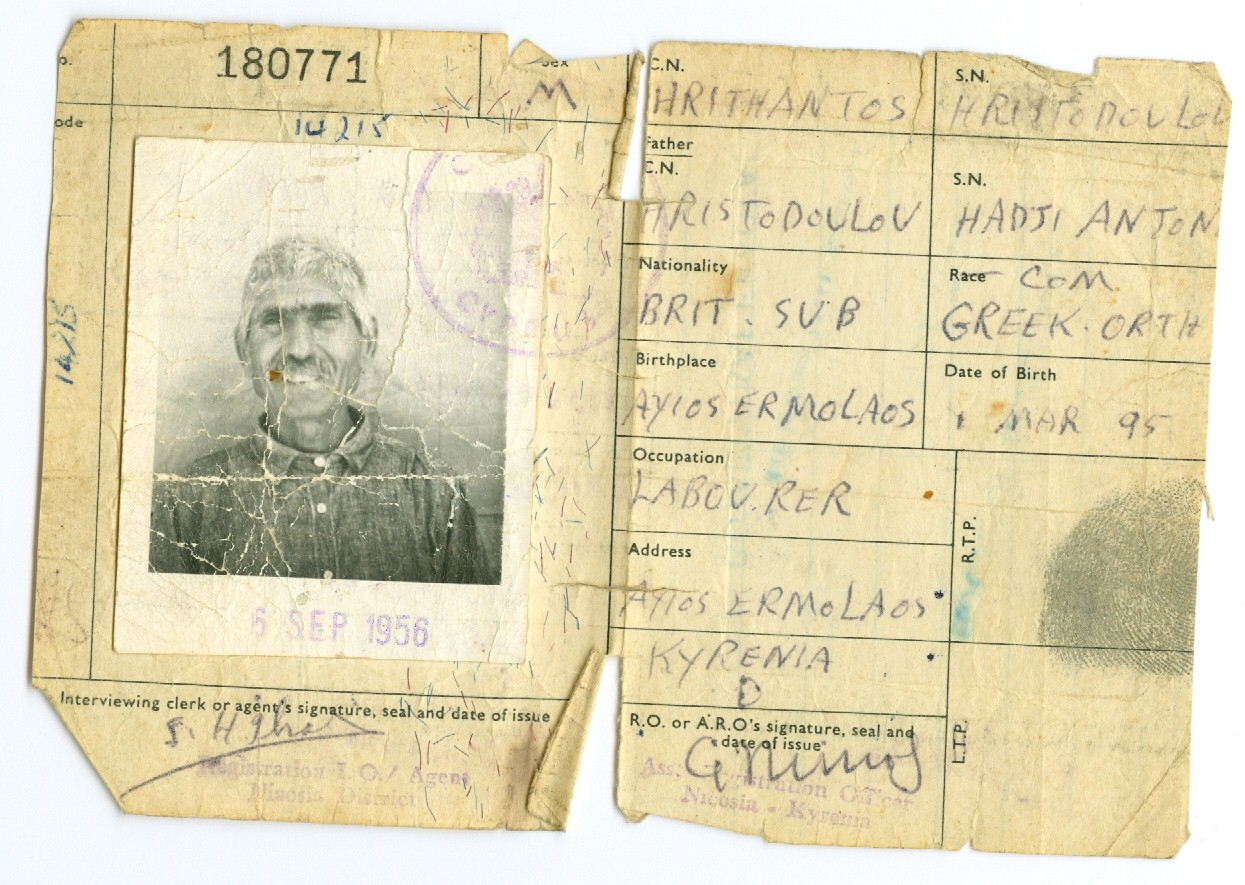
Identification card of an MMC member (Chrysanthos Christodoulou of Agios Ermolaos).

.On 24 April 1916, the commander of the British Salonika Army, Bryan Mahon, stated that for his advance towards the Greco–Serbian frontier to succeed, the recruitment of 1,676 pack animals and 1,232 muleteers per division was needed. The rough terrain, limited infrastructure and underdeveloped railway network of Macedonia necessitated the use of pack animals for military logistics. On 24 May, the British ambassador to Greece, Francis Elliot, requested the high commissioner of Cyprus, John Eugene Clauson, to raise a force of 7,000 Cypriot muleteers for the Macedonian Front in order to augment the British Salonika Army. Three days later, the British H.Q. in Salonika sent another inquiry, urgently requesting 3,000 Cypriot muleteers. The National Schism in then-neutral Greece had frustrated British efforts to recruit locals from among the pro–Triple Entente faction, with the Greek prime minister, Eleftherios Venizelos, stating that he could not guarantee that the British would be allowed to continue their recruitment drive. On 24 June, a belated reply from the British War Office ordered Clauson to purchase 2,000 mules and recruit 500 men to command them, this period of inaction drew the criticism of the Colonial Office. On 25 July, the first group of 150 muleteers disembarked at Salonika. On 27 July, 3,000 additional Cypriot muleteers (with a ratio of 1 foreman per 20 muleteers) were urgently solicited for the Macedonian Front. In the meantime, a Mule Purchasing Commission had been established in Famagusta, under the supervision of Major L. Sisman. On 2 August, 796 muleteers arrived at Salonika, 500 joining the XII Corps and 196 the XVI Corps.

On 14 August, Clauson issued an order concerning the mandatory requisitioning mules for military purposes under martial law. From July until November, 2,750 mules, 1,200 donkeys and 140 ponies were sent to Salonika. By July 1919, over 3,500 mules and 3,000 donkeys had been exported. A number of rudimentary recruitment posters and leaflets were issued starting in summer of 1916; the posters were issued in English, Greek and Ottoman Turkish. British recruiters used pro-Enosis rhetoric in order to increase the number of Greek Cypriot recruits, using references to “Macedonian brothers” and “eternal enemies” (Bulgarians). The recruiters also falsely promised that the muleteers would stay away from the frontlines. Those interested were invited to the recruitment camps situated at Paphos, Limassol, Nicosia, Kyrenia and Famagusta. As of 6 November, 3,496 Cypriots had joined the corps in the capacity of muleteers, saddlers, farriers, coachmen, foremen and interpreters; signing up for 12 month contracts. Despite the opposition of the Turkish Cypriot political leadership to the war, by 1918 approximately 11% of the recruits were members of the Turkish Cypriot community. On 18 October, special legislation banned emigration for Cypriot males of conscription age in order to halt the mass migration of Cypriots to the USA. Passports that were already issued were subsequently revoked.

The ranks of the Macedonian Mule Corps personnel were distinguished by an arm brassard bearing the letters "MMC" and a cap badge. Recruits underwent 15 days of basic training while in Cyprus, and were provided further mule and weapons training upon arriving in Salonika. Although officially muleteers were unarmed, a MMC veteran claimed that they were given Lee–Enfield rifles for the purpose of self defense. A crucial factor in the drive's success was the high wages (90 drachmas per month), free food and clothing offered, as well as the fact that the muleteers were registered as camp followers under the Army Act. In July 1917, the Mule Purchasing Commission was renamed into the Muleteer Recruiting and Staff Purchasing Commission, shifting its focus towards the recruiting of manpower. During the course of the campaign, Cypriot muleteers were tasked with transporting food, weapons, ammunition and water to the front as well as carrying injured soldiers back and working on road construction. The animals and their handlers endured harsh conditions, such as navigating swamps, rivers and mountain terrain during the night and under freezing temperatures. Following the end of World War I many members of the corps extended their contracts. Cypriots were subsequently stationed at Varna, Gallipoli, Constantinople, Serres, Doiran, Serbia and other locales. Others participated in the Allied Southern Russia intervention, during the Russian Civil War.

== Aftermath ==
The Corps was dissolved in March 1919. By that time, 12,288 men had served in the unit, or approximately 20% of the Cypriot male population between the ages of 18 and 39. The Corps played a crucial role in the logistics of the British and French armies on the Macedonian Front, contributing to the eventual Allied victory. The veterans of the Macedonian Mule Corps received 3,000 bronze British War Medals. Approximately 40 graves of Cypriot muleteers are scattered in British war cemeteries located in Macedonia, Sofia, Constantinople and Georgia. At the conclusion of the war most of the mules were sold to Macedonian civilians, although some were shipped to Egypt and later on to Anton Denikin's Anti-Bolshevik Volunteer Army which was at the time fighting in the Russian Civil War.

== See also ==
- Chinese Labour Corps
- Maltese Labour Corps
