= Gold (Cleave novel) =

2012 sports novel by Chris Cleave

- First edition (UK)
- Author: Chris Cleave
- Language: English
- Genre: Literary fiction
- Publisher: Sceptre (UK); Simon & Schuster (US)
- Publication date: 3 July 2012
- Publication place: United Kingdom
- Media type: Print (hardcover)
- Pages: 336

Gold is a 2012 sports novel by British author Chris Cleave and was published by Simon & Schuster on 3 July 2012 in the US, and by Sceptre in the UK. The story focuses on the friendship and rivalry between two women and the effects that come from the choices they make and the events that they cannot prevent.

== Plot ==
Gold follows two friends and professional cycling rivals, Kate Meadows and Zoe Castle, through their lives until the London Olympics. Meeting at the age of nineteen at a cycling challenge, Kate chooses a family over cycling while Zoe maintains her profession, winning several medals at both Olympic Games and Commonwealth Games. Kate re-enters competitive cycling with hopes of competing in the London Olympics. Kate's daughter, Sophie, is seriously ill with leukemia during the preparation for the Olympics.

== Background ==
Cleave stated that the then-upcoming 2012 Summer Olympics prompted him to write Gold, with his children also serving as a source of inspiration. He also did research on cycling as he wrote the book, with the book going through six drafts before its final version.

== Reception ==
Critical reception for Gold was positive, with the Guardian praising it as "thrillingly good". The Toronto Star and Kirkus Reviews both gave positive reviews of the novel, with the Star stating that Gold was "a sports novel [that] transcends the tropes and clichés of sport journalism".

The Telegraph gave an ambivalent review for Gold, saying that "Cleave’s writing style suggests that he enjoys the practical mechanics of his subject, but there are times when concrete, industrial images just can’t work". Bruce Barcott of the New York Times praised Gold but stated that instead of being the "“North Dallas Forty” or “Ball Four” of an obscure Olympic sport" it was "“Beaches” on bikes".
