= Mercantile Marine War Medal =

- Type: Campaign medal
- Awarded for: Campaign service
- Description: Bronze circular medal
- Country: United Kingdom
- Presented by: the Monarch of the United Kingdom and the British Dominions, and Emperor of India
- Eligibility: Merchant Marine mariners
- Campaign: First World War
- Clasps: None
- Established: 1919

Highlights
- Total: 133,135
- Ribbon bar

Order of wear
- Next (higher): British War Medal
- Next (lower): Naval General Service Medal (1915)

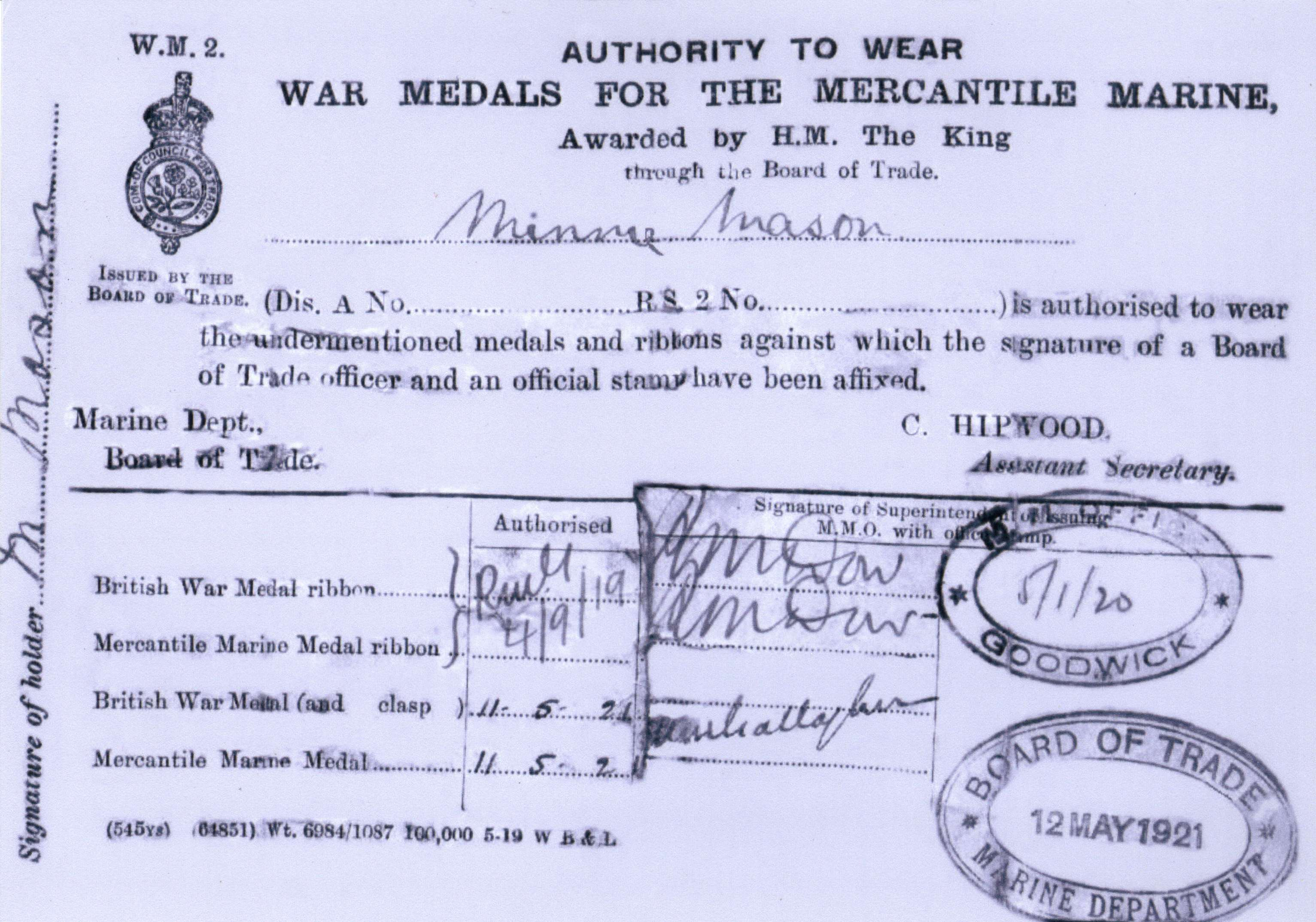
Authority to wear the British War Medal and the Mercantile Marine Medal issued to Minnie Mason for service on English Channel ferries in World War I

The Mercantile Marine War Medal was established in 1919 and awarded by the Board of Trade of the United Kingdom to mariners of the British Mercantile Marine (later renamed the Merchant Navy) for service at sea during the First World War.

== Institution ==
Between 5 August 1914, the day following the British declaration of war against the German Empire, and the armistice of 11 November 1918, 2,479 British merchant vessels and 675 British fishing vessels were lost as a result of enemy action, with respectively 14,287 and 434 lives lost. The Mercantile Marine War Medal was instituted by the Board of Trade and approved by the King to reward the war service of the officers and men of the Mercantile Marine who, while only trained as peacetime mariners, continued to serve while running the risk of being attacked at sea during the war.

== Award criteria ==
One or more voyages through a danger zone during the war qualified a mariner for the award of the medal, as did service at sea for not less than six months between 4 August 1914 and 11 November 1918. Men who served in coastal trades, such as pilots, fishermen and lightship and post office cable ship crews could also qualify. There was no minimum qualifying period for those killed or wounded by enemy action, or taken prisoner.

All recipients also received the British War Medal.

Members of the Royal Navy seconded to the Mercantile Marine to man defensive weapons on merchant ships could qualify for the Mercantile Marine War Medal in addition to other campaign medals. Men who transferred in or out of the Mercantile Marine from or to the fighting services could also qualify for the award of the Victory Medal and, if appropriate, the 1914 Star or 1914–15 Star, while still being eligible for the Mercantile Marine War Medal. Service solely in the Mercantile Marine, however, did not count for the award of the Victory Medal or either of the two Stars.

Altogether 133,135 Mercantile Marine War Medals were awarded. Over 17,000 were to seamen born outside the United Kingdom, including 624 to Canadians.

== Description ==
=== Medal ===
The Mercantile Marine War Medal is a disk, struck in bronze and 36 millimetres in diameter. The straight clasp non-swivelling suspender is attached to the medal with a single-toe claw mount and a pin through the upper edge of the medal. The recipient's name only is impressed on the rim in sans-serif capital letters and the first given name is usually in full.

Obverse

The obverse is identical to that of the British War Medal and shows Sir Bertram Mackennal's bareheaded effigy of King George V facing left, with the legend "GEORGIVS V BRITT: OMN: REX ET IND: IMP:" (George V, King of all the British Isles and Emperor of India).

Reverse

The reverse, designed by Harold Stabler, shows a merchant steamship ploughing through heavy seas, with an enemy submarine sinking on portside and a sailing ship in the background. The exergue is inscribed, in three lines, "FOR•WAR•SERVICE", "MERCANTILE•MARINE" and "•1914–1918•". Around the rim enclosing the whole image is a laurel wreath.

Ribbon

The ribbon is 32 millimetres (1.25 inches) wide, with a 13½ millimetres wide green band, a 5 millimetres wide white band and a 13½ millimetres wide red band, representing a ship's starboard and port running lights with the masthead steaming light in the centre.

== Memorial plaque ==
Along with the medal, the next-of-kin of those men and women who lost their lives as a result of enemy action, were presented with a memorial plaque and memorial scroll, both inscribed with the deceased's full name, and a condolence slip.

Memorial plaque for Ernest Horner

The Memorial Plaque is a medallion designed by Edward Carter Preston, struck in bronze and 4 3/4 inches (120 millimetres) in diameter, which shows Britannia with two dolphins behind her and a male lion in the foreground. Around the perimeter the medallion is inscribed "HE*DIED*FOR*FREEDOM*" at left and "*AND*HONOVR" at right. The deceased's full name is in relief in a rectangular frame above the lion's head. The exergue depicts the defeat of the Prussian eagle by the British lion. More than a million plaques were produced to commemorate the sacrifice of military and mercantile marine men and women who fell between 4 August 1914 and 30 April 1920.

=== Condolence slip ===
The text of the condolence slip which accompanied the plaque reads: "Buckingham Palace. I send you this Memorial on behalf of my people and myself. We all desire that the brave and loyal service of the Mercantile Marine in war-time shall be gratefully recorded, and that the names of those who gave their lives for us shall be handed down with honour from one generation to another. (Signed) George RI".

=== Memorial scroll ===
The memorial scroll text reads: "This scroll is written to honour that great company of our men who though trained only to the peaceful traffic of the sea yet in the hour of national danger gave themselves with the ancient skill and endurance of their breed to face new perils and new cruelties of war and in a right cause served fearlessly to the end. And this is written further to ensure that among the rest shall be ever freshly remembered the name and service of... (full name)."

== Order of wear ==
The order of wear of the First World War campaign stars and medals is as follows:

- The 1914 Star.
- The 1914–15 Star.
- The British War Medal.
- The Mercantile Marine War Medal.
- The Victory Medal (United Kingdom).
- The Territorial War Medal.

=== South Africa ===
On 6 April 1952 the Union of South Africa instituted its own range of military decorations and medals. These new awards were worn before all earlier British decorations and medals awarded to South Africans, with the exception of the Victoria Cross, which still took precedence before all other awards. Of the First World War campaign medals applicable to South Africans, the Mercantile Marine War Medal takes precedence as shown.

- Preceded by the British War Medal.
- Succeeded by the Victory Medal (South Africa).

== See also ==
- Sea Gallantry Medal: also issued by the Board of Trade
