= The Other Hand =

2008 novel by Chris Cleave

The Other Hand Little Bee
- Front cover of the first edition
- Author: Chris Cleave
- Language: English
- Genre: Literary fiction
- Publisher: Sceptre
- Publication date: 7 August 2008
- Publication place: United Kingdom
- Media type: Print (hardcover)
- Pages: 368 pp (first edition)
- ISBN: 978-0-340-96340-1
- OCLC: 227274979

The Other Hand, also known as Little Bee, is a 2008 novel by British author Chris Cleave. It is a dual narrative story about a Nigerian asylum-seeker and a British magazine editor, who meet during the oil conflict in the Niger Delta, and are re-united in England several years later. Cleave, inspired as a university student by his temporary employment in an asylum detention centre, wrote the book in an attempt to humanise the plight of asylum-seekers in Britain. The novel examines the treatment of refugees by the asylum system, as well as issues of British colonialism, globalization, political violence and personal accountability.

The novel was published by Sceptre, an imprint of Hodder & Stoughton. Sales were initially slow, but increased as a result of "word-of-mouth" publicity, with the book eventually ranking 13th on the 2009 Sunday Times bestseller list. It has also been ranked #1 on the New York Times bestseller list. The novel has received mixed reviews from critics. It has been praised for its focus on underlying human decency; however, some reviewers felt its events were contrived. The two protagonists have been juxtaposed, with less sympathy evoked by Surrey-born Sarah than Nigerian-refugee Little Bee. The novel was nominated for the 2008 Costa Book Awards and a 2009 Commonwealth Writers' Prize. A film adaptation is now in pre-production, and will be produced by and star Julia Roberts. Amazon Studios will be distributing the film.

== Background ==
Cleave spent his early childhood in West Africa, which he credits for having partially inspired The Other Hand. Further inspiration came from Cleaves's temporary employment while studying experimental psychology at the University of Oxford. During the summer, Cleave painted underpasses, gardened and picked up litter, and hoped to use this experience to write a book. His final job was at Campsfield House in Oxfordshire, an immigration detention centre. Cleave spent three days serving food to residents from war zones including Somalia, Eritrea and the Balkans. He explained: "I got talking with some of them and said why are you here? Why are you in prison? It's not illegal and yet we concentrate them in these places. It's a text-book definition of a concentration camp. The conditions are appalling. I was shocked enough for that to be the end of my light comedy book of my amusing summers working as a labourer." Cleave believes he would not have written the novel were he not a parent, as he does not wish for his children "to grow up into a world that is callous and stupid."

In 2005, an incident inspired Cleave to write The Other Hand. Four years previously, in 2001, an Angolan asylum-seeker named Manuel Bravo had arrived in England with his 9-year-old son. After being detained in an immigration centre for four years, officials decided to forcibly deport Bravo and his son back to Angola the next morning. During the night, Bravo committed suicide, aware that his son, who was still a minor, could not be deported unaccompanied. Cleave felt compelled to write about the "dirty secret" that is the British immigration system, and to do so in such a way as to showcase the "unexpected humour" of the refugees wherever possible, in order to make the book "an enjoyable and compelling read" for his audience. Cleave explained:

I think the job is important because there's something you can do in fiction that you don't have the space to do in news media, which is to give back a measure of humanity to the subjects of an ongoing story. When I started to imagine the life of one asylum seeker in particular, rather than asylum seekers in general, the scales fell from my eyes in regard to any ideological position I might have held on the issue. It's all about exploring the mystery and the wonder of an individual human life. Life is precious, whatever its country of origin.

— Chris Cleave

== Plot ==
Using alternating first-person perspectives, the novel tells the stories of Little Bee, a Nigerian refugee, and Sarah O'Rourke (née Summers), a magazine editor from Surrey. After spending two years detained in a British immigration detention centre, Little Bee is illegally released after a fellow refugee performs sexual favours for a detention officer. She travels to the home of Sarah and her husband Andrew, whom she met two years previously on a beach in the Niger Delta. Sarah is initially unaware of Little Bee's presence, until Andrew, haunted by guilt of their shared past, commits suicide. Little Bee reveals herself to Sarah on the day of Andrew's funeral, and helps her to care for her four-year-old son Charlie.

Through a mutual reflection on their past, it is revealed that Sarah and Andrew were on holiday at the time of their meeting with Little Bee. The trip was an attempt to salvage their marriage after Andrew discovered Sarah had been unfaithful to him, embarking on an affair with Home Office employee Lawrence Osborn. While walking on the beach one morning, they were approached by a then 14-year-old Little Bee, and her older sister Nkiruka. The girls were being pursued by soldiers who had burned down their village and intended for there to be no witnesses left alive. The soldiers arrived and murdered a guard from the O'Rourkes' hotel, but offered to spare the lives of the girls if Andrew would amputate his own middle finger with a machete. Afraid, and believing the soldiers would murder the girls anyway, Andrew refused, but Sarah complied in his place. The soldiers took both girls away, leaving the couple in doubt as to whether the soldiers would leave one girl alive in response, as they promised.

I smiled back at Charlie and I knew that the hopes of this whole human world could fit inside one soul. This is a good trick. This is called, globalisation.

— Little Bee

Little Bee explains that although Nkiruka was gang raped, murdered, and cannibalised by the soldiers, she was allowed to escape, and stowed away in the cargo hold of a ship bound for England. Sarah allows Little Bee to stay with her, intent on helping her become a legal British citizen. Lawrence, who is still involved with Sarah, disapproves of her actions and contemplates turning Little Bee in to the police. When he informs Little Bee that he is considering this, she responds that allowing her to stay would be what is best for Sarah, so if Lawrence turns her in, Little Bee will get revenge by telling his wife Linda about his affair. The two reach an uneasy truce. After spending several days together, Sarah, Lawrence, Little Bee and Charlie take a trip to the park. Charlie goes missing, and Little Bee calls the police while Sarah searches for him. Although he is quickly found, the police become suspicious of Little Bee, and discover that she is in the country illegally.

Little Bee is detained and quickly deported back to Nigeria, where she believes she will be killed. Lawrence uses his Home Office connections to track Little Bee's deportation details, and Sarah and Charlie are able to accompany her back home. Sarah believes that Little Bee will be safe as long as she is present, and together they begin collecting stories for a book Andrew had begun, and which Sarah intends to finish on his behalf, about the atrocities committed in the Nigerian oil conflict. During a trip to the same beach where they first encountered one another, soldiers arrive to take Little Bee away. Despite being captured, Little Bee is not dispirited, and instead is ultimately hopeful at the sight of Charlie playing happily with a group of Nigerian children.

== Characters ==
The primary characters in The Other Hand are Little Bee, a Nigerian refugee, and Sarah, a middle-class Englishwoman. Critics have focused on the contrast between the two, with Caroline Elkins of The New York Times commenting that Sarah might initially appear "insipid" to readers, and that when juxtaposed with Little Bee, she seems "unsympathetic, even tiresome". Tim Teeman of The Times deemed Sarah "batty, bizarre and inconsistent, and despite the tragedy she has suffered, unsympathetic", while writing that in contrast: "Goodness peppers every atom of [Little Bee's] being." Other reviewers took an opposite stance. Margot Kaminski of the San Francisco Chronicle found Little Bee's characterisation problematic, writing: "Sometimes she's not convincing, and sometimes she tries too hard to convince. It's too often apparent that Little Bee is not real. This doesn't do justice to her story, and puts the burden back on the author to show that he's representing her, rather than exploiting her." Ed Lake of The Daily Telegraph felt that "Bee's arch reasonableness and implausibly picturesque speech mean she often comes off as a too-cute cipher", and ultimately found Sarah the more convincing character.

The Guardian's Lawrence Norfolk commented that Sarah is a "far from perfect heroine: a semi-neglectful mother and unfaithful wife", but noted that "Cleave does not mock Sarah (and life in Kingston upon Thames) any more than he does Little Bee and her experiences in Nigeria." Norfolk felt that: "For all the characters' faults, none of them is presented as inauthentic or standing for something that we are intended to disbelieve." On the disparity in sympathy for Sarah and Little Bee, Cleave assessed: "Sarah inevitably suffers by proximity to Little Bee, who is much easier to like. If Sarah is more twisted, I think it's because her path through life has necessarily been more convoluted. Little Bee's life is extremely harrowing but it is also very simple – she is swimming very hard against the current, struggling to survive and not to be swept away. Sarah doesn’t have the luxury of knowing in which direction she should swim."

Steve Giergerich of the St. Louis Post-Dispatch felt that Sarah and Little Bee are both "so richly drawn that the supporting characters suffer by comparison." These supporting characters are Andrew, Sarah's husband, Lawrence, her lover, Clarissa her colleague and Charlie, her four-year-old son, who for much of the novel answers only to "Batman" and dresses only in his Batman costume. Sarah Liss of CBC News deemed Andrew and Lawrence the two least-likeable characters in the novel, describing Andrew as "an ordinary guy with self-righteous beliefs who comes up slightly short when he's tested by real life" and Lawrence as a "cowardly yes-man". Cleave agreed that for Lawrence, "career and propriety are more important than basic morality. He's gone so far down that road that he can't come back, and he's made more villainous for all the things he could do but doesn't." Charlie is based on Cleave's oldest son, who similarly spent six months aged four answering only to "Batman". He forms the emotional centre of the novel, holding the adult characters together, and is a study in the early formation of identity. Cleave explained: "Little Bee is a novel about where our individuality lies – which layers of identity are us, and which are mere camouflage. So it's a deliberate choice to use the metaphor of a child who is engaging in his first experiments with identity – in Charlie's case by taking on the persona of a superhero."

== Themes ==
The Other Hand presents a critique of the British asylum system and attitude towards asylum-seekers. Cleave feels there exists a "general lethargy" about the way asylum-seekers are treated in Britain, and though he believes he is not a political writer, the book begins with an extract from a 2005 UK Home Office publication entitled "United Kingdom: A Journey to Citizenship". The extract reads: "Britain is proud of its tradition of providing a safe haven for people fleeting (sic) persecution and conflict." Cleave questioned: "If a government can't even successfully proof-read such a fundamental document, how seriously can we take its asylum procedure?" In writing The Other Hand, Cleave hoped to "humanise" the issue for readers. Despite discussions of political violence and British Colonialism within the novel, Sarah L. Courteau, editor of the Wilson Quarterly commented: "You're almost entirely unaware of its politics because the book doesn't deal in abstractions but in human beings." For this reason, she deemed The Other Hand "the best kind of political novel". Emma Philip of The Courier-Mail has opined that while The Other Hand does make political points, readers should not confuse it with a political book, as the "overwhelming beauty" of the relationship between Sarah, Little Bee and Charlie "far outweighs the political message."

We're often told that we live in a globalized world, and we talk about it all the time, but people don't stop to think about what it means.

— Chris Cleave, CBC News

The novel also deals with the issue of globalisation. Courteau observed that although Little Bee learns English from newspapers she acquires at the English detention centre, her reference points are still Nigerian, and thus through her narrative voice Cleave "illustrates the forcible dislocations of a globalized world." Cleave chose to explore the issue in The Other Hand as he believes that, although globalisation is frequently discussed, people rarely consider its meaning. He explained: "money can move freely across national borders, but people can't. They're actively prevented from going where the money is. Capital is global, but labour isn't. I believe that's the cause of two major crises that we're involved in as a species – one is a financial crisis and one is a refugee crisis. Imagine a world where money can't move, where capital is stuck in its country of origin, but people can freely move where the work is! That's an alternate interpretation of globalization that would solve a lot of problems." Although Cleave did not intend for the novel to be heavily political, he felt it was important to raise the issue, given the refugee subject matter of The Other Hand.

Marital infidelity features throughout the sections of the novel narrated by Sarah. Cleave discussed: "When you are choosing a lover, you're choosing a philosophy; it's not about sex, it's not about marriage. With Sarah, her unfaithfulness is just one of the symptoms of the fact that she's torn and is going to have to make this strong moral choice." Sarah's storyline also explores her moral culpability following Andrew's suicide. Personal accountability is a central theme of the novel, with Elkins of The New York Times opining that by not focusing on "postcolonial guilt or African angst", Cleave is able to use the novel to challenge readers' conceptions of civility and ethical choice. Margot Kaminski of the San Francisco Chronicle similarly feels that the book delivered a message of anti-complacency, however believes that it does so by "bemoaning the normality of the First World in the face of the horrors of the Third." She deemed The Other Hand essentially a novel about "the borders we draw, and the real damage they inflict".

== Style ==
Having spent almost two years working on the novel, Cleave decided upon using the dual narrative, as: "This is a story of two worlds: the developed and the developing, and of the mutual incomprehension that sometimes dooms them to antagonism." He found it technically challenging to write from a female perspective, but felt that it prevented him from unwittingly using his own voice to animate the characters, explaining: "It forces me to listen, to think, and to write more precisely." Kaminski accused Cleave of cultural appropriation, asking rhetorically: "When a white male author writes as a young Nigerian girl, is it an act of empathy, or identity theft?" Cleave has responded by stating that he sympathises with those who feel he has no right to write from the perspective of a Nigerian girl, but feels that he does it well. He believes that the best mechanism for telling a story about crossing borderlines is to depict both sides. He conducted interviews with actual asylum seekers and illegal immigrants, a psychiatrist specialising in the trauma of child refugees, and members of London's Nigerian community, researching speech patterns to shape the "quirks and cadences" of Little Bee's narrative voice.

A central stylistic feature of the novel is the lack of detail Cleave gives regarding elements of Little Bee's past. "Little Bee" is an assumed name, described as a "mechanism for survival" by Courteau, as the character is forced to discard her true name when pursued by soldiers, through fear it may reveal her tribe and religion. Her real name, Udo, is not revealed until the end of the novel. Courteau also highlights the fact that Little Bee's Nigerian enemies and their motivations are never explicitly described, as the novel is told through the first-person narrative, and Little Bee herself is limited in her understanding of them. Cleave intended for the story as a whole never to be fully explicit, relying instead on readers' interpretation of the characters' dialogue.

Throughout the novel, Little Bee considers how she would explain England to "the girls back home" in Nigeria. Cleave uses the girls as a Greek chorus, providing a foil to allow the cultural dissonance experienced by Little Bee to be made explicit. He feels the device is more natural than having Little Bee narrate her alarm first hand, allowing the reader to appreciate the cultural gulf, and Little Bee to seem knowing as opposed to tragic. Through Little Bee's narration, Cleave examines human culture from the opposite perspective as science fiction does, having an extraordinary protagonist explore an ordinary world. This contemporary realism gives a significance to mundane events experienced by Little Bee, while bringing into focus "sad and ignoble" aspects of English culture such as the detention system. Cleave commented: "We have become accustomed to viewing our own actions in soft focus, but the alien narrator has not yet acquired this cultural immunity. She sees us as we can no longer see ourselves."

Courteau compared The Other Hand to Ian McEwan's Enduring Love observing that both novels are formed around "a single horrific encounter", and praised Cleave for his "restrained, diamond-hard prose". Philip drew a different comparison, opining that Cleave's writing style—using plain language to describe atrocities— was reminiscent of John Boyne's The Boy in the Striped Pyjamas.

== Publication history ==
The novel was first published on 7 August 2008, released in hardback by Sceptre in the UK. The hardback edition sold just 3,000 copies in 2008, however the publication of a paperback copy, released on 5 February 2009, saw increased sales, with 100,000 paperback copies sold in Britain in March and April 2009, despite no advertising and little marketing for the novel. As of November 2009, 300,000 copies of the novel had been sold. Richard Brooks of The Times attributed its success to recommendations from readers to family and friends, with Cleave calling it "an example of word-of-mouth success." The novel was published in America and Canada by Simon & Schuster under the alternative title Little Bee. It was released in hardback and e-book format in February 2009, and in paperback in February 2010. Cleave likes both titles, believing that The Other Hand "speaks to the dichotomous nature of the novel, with its two narrators and two worlds", also referencing Sarah's injury, while Little Bee is appropriate as the novel is really the telling of Little Bee's story, and sounds "bright and approachable", in line with his aim to write "an accessible story about a serious subject."

=== Blurb ===
Mirroring the deliberately vague detail within the novel, the blurb on the book is unusually written, in that it does not name the characters or reveal the plot. It was written by a team at Sceptre led by marketing consultant Damian Horner, and has the approval of Cleave, who described it as "genius". Cleave explained: "I think readers are quite smart and don't really need the whole thing spelt out for them in a plot summary. It's nice to let them discover the book at their own speed. And the technique of the book is to release these dirty secrets gradually." The content of the blurb varies between UK and American editions of the novel, but both begin: "We don't want to tell you too much about this book. It is a truly special story and we don't want to spoil it." and end: "Once you have read it, you'll want to tell everyone about it. When you do, please don't tell them what happens either. The magic is in how it unfolds." James Spackman, Sales and Marketing Director for Sceptre, was initially sceptical of the blurb, particularly disliking the use of "we" for the publisher to address the reader directly. Once the book became a best-seller, however, he revised his stance, and now believes that the reason the blurb works is because it makes a virtue of denying the reader information, with an unusual format and "arrestingly direct" tone. The blurb won Sceptre the "Best Blurb" award at the 2010 Book Marketing Society Awards.

== Reception ==
The Other Hand reached number 13 on the 2009 Sunday Times bestseller list, and was the only literary title on the list without a Richard and Judy Book Club recommendation, a literary award or a film adaptation. It also topped The New York Times Best Seller list for paperback trade fiction in 2010. The novel was nominated at the 2008 Costa Book Awards, though lost to The Secret Scripture by Sebastian Barry. It was nominated for the 2009 Commonwealth Writers' Prize as the best book originating from Europe and South Asia, but lost to Unaccustomed Earth by Jhumpa Lahiri. In 2010, The Other Hand was longlisted for the International Dublin Literary Award, nominated by Cleveland Public Library, Seattle Public Library and Dunedin Public Libraries, New Zealand.

The book has received mixed reviews. Some critics have praised the novel for its focus on underlying human decency. The New York Times's Caroline Elkins felt that the pretext of the novel "initially feels contrived", but assessed that "in a world full of turpitude and injustice, it is [Sarah and Little Bee's] bold, impulsive choices that challenge the inevitability of despair, transforming a political novel into an affecting story of human triumph." James Urquhart of The Independent called the book "a powerful piece of art", writing: "Besides sharp, witty dialogue, an emotionally charged plot and the vivid characters' ethical struggles, The Other Hand delivers a timely challenge to reinvigorate our notions of civilised decency". Equally, Andrew Rosenheim of Publishers Weekly found the book noteworthy for Cleave's "ability to find a redemptive grace in the midst of almost inconceivable horror." while Jeremy Jehu of The Daily Telegraph deemed it an "elegant parable" and a "challenge to every cosy, knee-jerk liberal inclined to spout off about our shared humanity and global obligations."

A separate Daily Telegraph review, this by critic Ed Lake, took a dissimilar stance, opining that that book is "pervaded by a vaguely distasteful glossiness", and that "if Cleave is writing from great depths of feeling, he hides it well." Lake deemed the book "faultlessly relevant, but ultimately cloying." Another Publishers Weekly review was also less positive, calling the book "beautifully staged" but "haphazardly plotted", and noting: "Cleave has a sharp cinematic eye, but the plot is undermined by weak motivations and coincidences." Teeman of The Times felt that the book was overwritten, and wished "twistedly" that it had a less positive conclusion, commenting: "With every motive and action explicitly drawn, fleshed out and explained, there is no room for mystery, ambiguity or even tension."

== Film adaptation ==
Initial reports touted the possibility of a film adaptation; six offers were made from interested companies. The film was to star Nicole Kidman, and was to be produced by Kidman, Gail Mutrux and Per Saari through Mutrux's production company Pretty Picture, and Kidman's, Blossom Films. Shawn Slovo was to write the script, and Christine Langan was to be the executive producer. Kidman had already read the novel before Mutrux contacted her about producing the film, on a flight between Los Angeles and Australia. The Times reported that she was "so eager" to play Sarah that she personally competed with several film studios in order to secure the rights to the book.

However, online references to this project went dead within a couple of years, and as of 2017 no film had been made.
