= Territorial War Medal =

Territorial Force War Medal
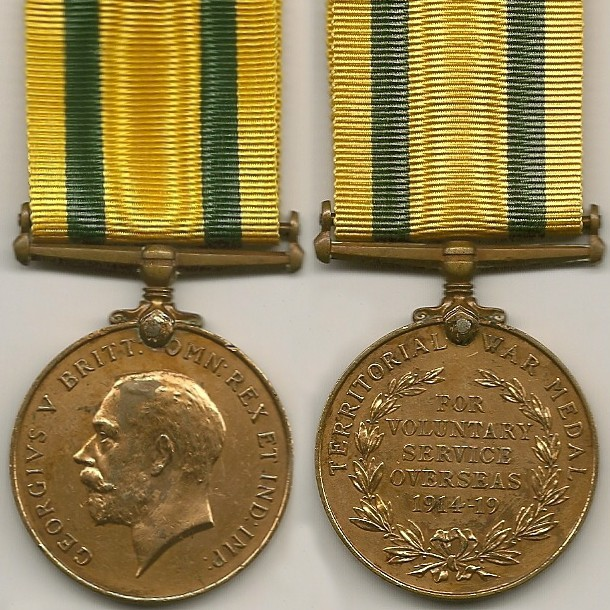
- Type: Campaign medal
- Awarded for: Campaign service
- Description: Bronze disk, 36mm diameter.
- Country: United Kingdom
- Presented by: the Monarch of the United Kingdom and the British Dominions, and Emperor of India
- Eligibility: British forces
- Campaign: First World War
- Clasps: None
- Established: April 1920

Highlights
- Total: 33,944
- Ribbon bar

Precedence
- Next (higher): Victory Medal (United Kingdom); Victory Medal (South Africa)

The Territorial Force War Medal was a campaign medal awarded to members of the British Territorial Force and Territorial Force Nursing Service who served overseas in World War I. It is the rarest of the five British Great War medals.

== Award Criteria ==
The medal was established in April 1920 for award to members of the Territorial Force and Territorial Force Nursing Service who volunteered for service overseas on or before 30 September 1914, and served overseas. They had to:

- have been serving with the Force on 4 August 1914; or
- have completed four years service with the Force before 4 August 1914 and rejoined on or before 30 September 1914.

In addition provided they:

- undertook, either verbally or by written agreement on or before 30 September 1914 to serve outside the United Kingdom, such agreement being operative after 4 August 1914, and
- have served outside the United Kingdom between 5 August 1914 and 11 November 1918 (both dates inclusive; the last date was in 1918 though the years on the reverse said 1914–19) and
- did not qualify for the 1914 Star or 1914-15 Star.

A total of 33,944 Territorial Force War Medals were awarded. This includes 227 to nurses of the Territorial Force Nursing Service, the only women to receive the medal. The numbers given to each regiment varied widely. For example, 63 were awarded to Seaforth Highlanders, where all three Territorial Force battalions were in France by 1915, compared with 824 to the East Surrey Regiment, where both Territorial battalions undertook garrison duty in India until 1917, and therefore did not qualify for the 1914 or 1914-15 Star.

== Description ==
- The medal is a circular, bronze and of 36mm (1.42 in) diameter, with a straight bar suspender, with the following design:
- Obverse: a King George V bareheaded effigy, facing left, with the legend: 'GEORGIVS V BRITT : OMN : REX ET IND : IMP :' ;
- Reverse: a wreath with in centre 'FOR / VOLUNTARY / SERVICE / OVERSEAS / 1914-19', and around the upper outer edge 'TERRITORIAL WAR MEDAL';
- Ribbon: yellow with two green stripes, 32 mm (1.25 in) wide;
- Naming: The number, rank name and unit of the recipient were impressed on the rim in block capitals.

== Order of wear ==
The order of wear of medals awarded for service during the First World War is as follows:

- 1914 Star.
- 1914–15 Star.
- British War Medal.
- Mercantile Marine War Medal.
- Victory Medal.
- Territorial Force War Medal.

== See also ==
- British campaign medals
- Territorial Force Imperial Service Badge

== Bibliography ==
- Dorling, H. Taprell (1956). Ribbons and Medals. London: A.H.Baldwin & Sons. OCLC 930416375.
- Hayward; Birch; Bishop (2006). British Battles and Medals (7th ed.). London: Spink. pp. 508–511. ISBN 1-902040-77-5.
- Mussell, John, ed. (20 September 2014). Medal Yearbook 2015. Honiton, Devon: Token Publishing Ltd. p. 177. ISBN 978-1-908828-17-0.
- Williamson, Howard J. (2011). The Great War Medal Collectors Companion Volume I. privately published by Anne Williamson. ISBN 978-0-9527544-4-2. "The book includes: – Campaign Medals. Full history of each medal, including Army Orders, Army Council Instructions & award criteria."
