= 100 Things Successful People Do =

2016 book by Nigel Cumberland

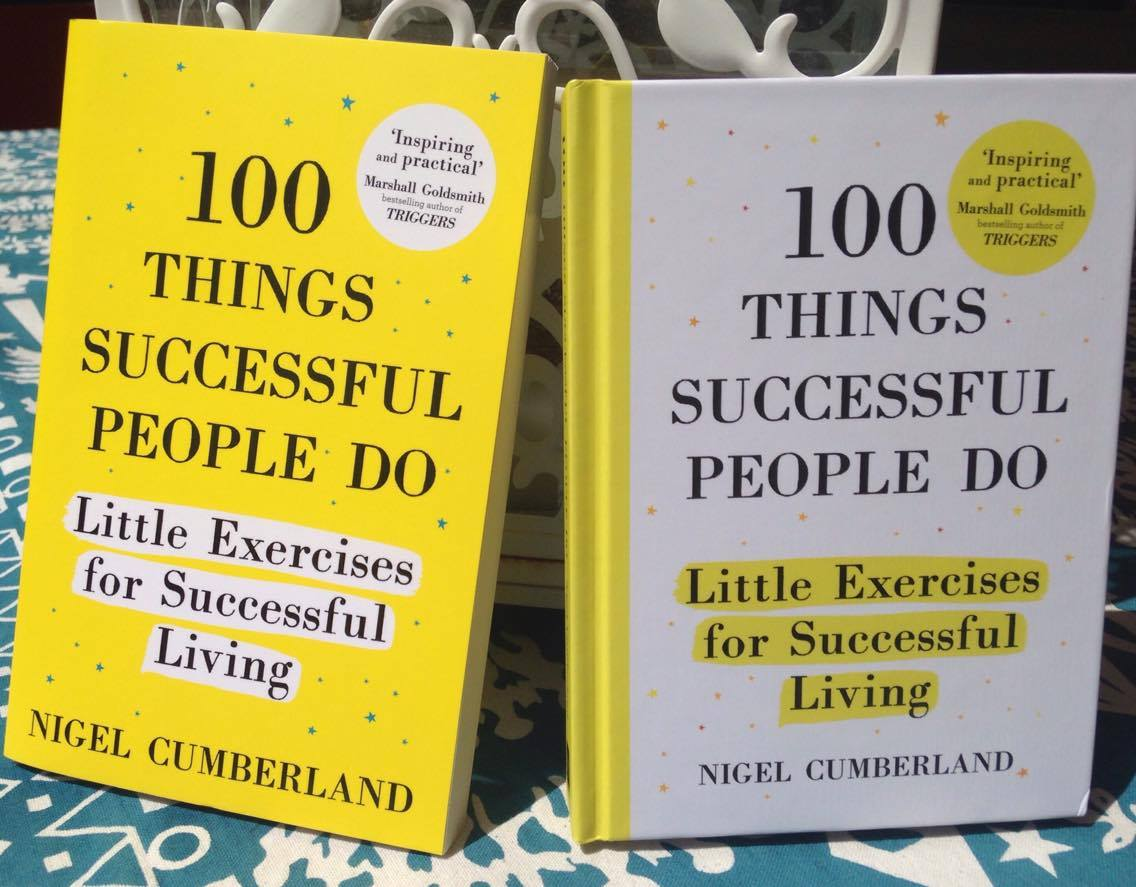
- Author: Nigel Cumberland
- Language: English
- Subject: self help, leadership, self-development
- Publisher: John Murray Learning, Hodder & Stoughton, Nicolas Brealey, Hachette UK
- Publication date: August 11, 2016 (hardcover), May 4, 2017 (paperback),
- Publication place: United Kingdom & United States
- Media type: Hardcover, Paperback, Audiobook and E-book
- Pages: 224 (Hardcover 1st edition)
- ISBN: 978-185-7-88662-7

100 Things Successful People Do: Little Exercises for Successful Living is a self-help guide by Nigel Cumberland.

== Publication ==
The book was published in August 2016 by John Murray Learning in the UK, a part of Hodder & Stoughton (imprint of Hachette UK). The US edition came out in October 2016 published by another Hachette UK imprint, Nicolas Brealey Publishing. The paperback version was published in the UK in May 2017, with a US edition coming out in late 2017. The book has a foreword written by Marshall Goldsmith. It has featured in various suggested reading lists in the mainstream media.

Translated editions of the book include in Burmese, Marathi, Japanese, Persian, Dutch, Romanian, Russian, and Slovak. Other translations include into Arabic, Bulgarian, Chinese, Czech, Indonesian, Korean, Spanish, Turkish, Vietnamese and Bangla.

The book is available to be used in schools for the visually impaired in the United States through the bookshare service.

The book is also available as an audiobook on sites such as Audible.com in the US.

There have been three following books by Cumberland entitled 100 Things Successful Millionaires Do: Little Lessons in Wealth Creation,100 Things Successful Leaders Do: Little Lessons in Leadership and 100 Things Productive People Do, which are also translated into foreign languages and reviewed.

== Contents ==
The book's 100 chapters each cover one of the 100 things that the author suggests successful people do in a couple of pages. A reviewer writes: "the book, subtitled Little Exercises For Successful Living, is easily digestible (perhaps even as a tip a day), with each spread over two pages – the first explaining the concept and the second featuring practical exercises and activities to apply it to your life." Another adds: "each secret to success is a powerful reminder of the ways you can make your life – and other's – more satisfied, at work, at home and in your relationships, with your health, wealth and in retirement."
