= British War Medal =

First World War campaign medal

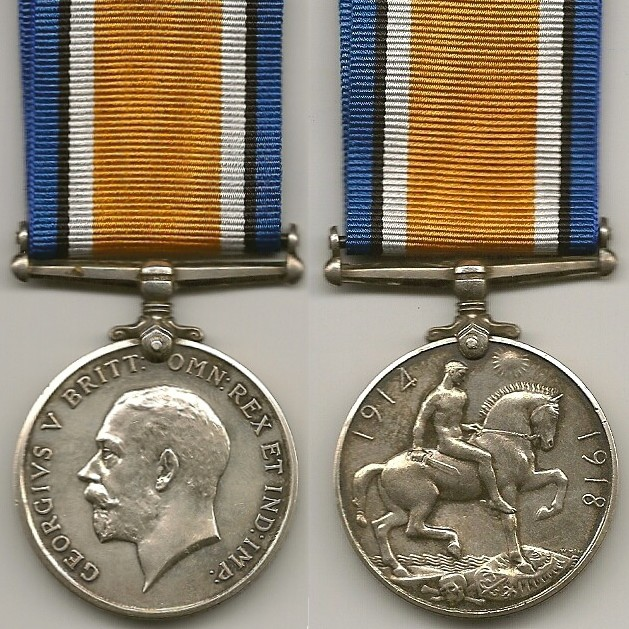
- Type: Campaign medal
- Awarded for: Campaign service
- Country: United Kingdom
- Presented by: the Monarch of the United Kingdom and the British Dominions, and Emperor of India
- Eligibility: British and Imperial forces
- Campaign: First World War
- Established: 26 July 1919

Highlights
- Total: 6,500,000 silver 110,000 bronze
- Ribbon bar

Precedence
- Next (higher): 1914–15 Star
- Next (lower): Victory Medal (United Kingdom); Victory Medal (South Africa)

The British War Medal is a campaign medal of the United Kingdom which was awarded to officers and men and women of British and Imperial forces for service in the First World War. Two versions of the medal were produced. About 6.5 million were struck in silver and 110,000 in bronze, the latter awarded to, among others, the Chinese, Maltese and Indian Labour Corps.

== Institution ==
The British War Medal was instituted on 26 July 1919 for award to those who had rendered service between 5 August 1914, the day following the British declaration of war against the German Empire, and the armistice of 11 November 1918, both dates inclusive. Consideration was given to the award of clasps to commemorate certain battles and theatres of operations and some 68 clasps were proposed for Naval recipients and 79 for the Army. While the Naval clasps were authorised, and printed in Admiralty Weekly Order 2051 of August 1920, none were awarded and the idea was abandoned in 1923 on the grounds of excessive cost.

== Award criteria ==
The British War Medal was awarded to all officers and men of British and Imperial forces who had served for a prescribed period during any stage of the war, or who had died on active service before the completion of this period. Eligibility was subsequently extended to cover service in 1919 and 1920 in mine-clearing at sea as well as participation in operations in North and South Russia, the eastern Baltic region, Siberia, the Black Sea and the Caspian Sea, during the allied intervention in the Russian Civil War.

=== Navy ===
For the Royal Navy, Royal Marines and the Dominion and Colonial naval forces, the criteria were 28 days mobilised service, without a requirement for overseas service. The medal was presented to the next-of-kin of all casualties, including those who were killed before the completion of this 28 days period. The medal was also awarded, with the same criteria, to members of the Women's Royal Naval Service, to members of Queen Alexandra's Royal Naval Nursing Service and Royal Naval Nursing Service Reserve, and to a number of non-Naval personnel who served on Royal Navy ships, such as canteen and medical staff. This was communicated via Admiralty Monthly Order 3973 of 1919.

=== Army ===
Officers and men of the British Army, including Dominion and Colonial forces, were required to have either entered an active theatre of war or to have left the United Kingdom for service overseas between 5 August 1914 and 11 November 1918, and to have completed 28 days mobilised service. The medal was also awarded in the event of death on active service before the completion of the prescribed period. The same criteria for eligibility were applied to members of the Women's Auxiliary Forces and staff of officially recognised military hospitals and members of recognised organisations such as the British Red Cross and the Order of Saint John who actually tended the sick and wounded. This was communicated via Army Order 266 of 1919.

=== Air Force ===
For the Air Forces, the Royal Naval Air Service and the Royal Flying Corps which were amalgamated into the new Royal Air Force on 1 April 1918, eligibility was broadly the same as for the British Army. It required overseas service, but members of the Air Forces who had seen combat whilst based in the United Kingdom, who had ferried aircraft to France or who had served on ships carrying aircraft were eligible for the award of the medal. This was communicated via Air Ministry Weekly Order 888 dated 7 August 1919.

=== Mercantile Marine ===
Merchant seamen qualified for the British War Medal in addition to the Mercantile Marine War Medal if they served at sea for not less than six months between 5 August 1914 and 11 November 1918, or had undertaken one or more voyages through a danger zone. There was no minimum qualifying period for those killed or disabled by enemy action or taken prisoner. Men who served in coastal trades, such as pilots, fishermen and lightship and post office cable ship crews could also qualify.

== Description ==
The medal, struck by the Royal Mint, is a silver or bronze disk, 36 millimetres (1.4 in) in diameter, with a straight clasp suspender without swivel.

Obverse

The obverse shows Sir Bertram Mackennal's bareheaded effigy of King George V facing left, with the legend "GEORGIVS V BRITT: OMN: REX ET IND: IMP:" (George V, King of all the British Isles and Emperor of India).

Reverse

The reverse, designed by William McMillan, shows Saint George naked on horseback and armed with a short sword, an allegory of the physical and mental strength which achieved victory over Prussianism. The horse tramples on the Prussian eagle shield and the emblems of death, a skull and cross-bones. In the background are ocean waves and just off-centre near the right upper rim is the risen sun of Victory. The years "1914" and "1918" appear on the perimeter in the left and right fields respectively.

Naming

The recipient's name, rank, service number and unit are impressed on the bottom edge of the medal. On medals awarded to Army officers, with the exception of the Royal Artillery, the name of the regiment or corps was omitted. No ship name is given for naval personnel, with the exception of medals to New Zealand personnel.

Ribbon

The watered silk ribbon is 32 millimetres (1.25 in) wide, with a 3 millimetres wide royal blue band, a 2 millimetres wide black band and a 3 millimetres wide white band, repeated in reverse order and separated by a 16 millimetres wide orange band. The colours are not thought to have any particular symbolic significance.

== Recipients ==
While all recipients of the 1914 Star, 1914–15 Star and Victory Medal qualified for the British War Medal, the British War Medal could be awarded alone, for example to members of the Royal Navy who were mobilised for 28 days but who did not proceed into a war zone, and to British soldiers who rendered service overseas but not in a theatre of war, including garrison duty in India.

Some 6,610,000 medals were awarded, 6,500,000 struck in silver and 110,000 in bronze. The bronze medals were awarded to the Chinese, Maltese, Egyptian, Indian and other Labour Corps, the Macedonian Mule Corps and to other native personnel mobilised for war service and who received military rates of pay.

Altogether 427,993 medals were awarded to Canadians who served in the Canadian Expeditionary Force.

== Nicknames ==
The trio of First World War medals, either one of the 1914 Star or the 1914–15 Star, the British War Medal and the Victory Medal, were collectively irreverently referred to as Pip, Squeak and Wilfred, after three comic strip characters, a dog, a penguin and a rabbit, which were popular in the immediate post-war era. Pip represented either of the two Stars, Squeak represented the British War Medal and Wilfred represented the Victory Medal.

Similarly, when only the British War Medal and Victory Medal are worn together, they are referred to as the Mutt and Jeff pair.

== Order of wear ==
The order of wear of the First World War campaign stars and medals is as follows:

- The 1914 Star.
- The 1914–15 Star.
- The British War Medal.
- The Mercantile Marine War Medal.
- The Victory Medal (United Kingdom).
- The Territorial War Medal.

=== South Africa ===
On 6 April 1952 the Union of South Africa instituted its own range of military decorations and medals. These new awards were worn before all earlier British decorations and medals awarded to South Africans, with the exception of the Victoria Cross, which still took precedence before all other awards. Of the First World War campaign medals applicable to South Africans, the British War Medal takes precedence as shown.

- Preceded by the 1914–15 Star.
- Succeeded by the Victory Medal (South Africa).

== Bibliography ==
- Dorling, H. Taprell; Guille, Lionel F. (1963). Ribbons and Medals. London: George Philip. OCLC 993415265.
- Hayward; Birch; Bishop (2006). British Battles and Medals (7th ed.). London: Spink. ISBN 1-902040-77-5.
- Joslin; Litherland; Simpkin (1988). British Battles and Medals (6th ed.). London: Spink. ISBN 0-907605-25-7.
- Mussell, John, ed. (20 September 2014). Medal Yearbook 2015. Honiton, Devon: Token Publishing Ltd. ISBN 978-1-908828-17-0.
- Williamson, Howard J. (2011). The Great War Medal Collectors Companion Volume I (1st ed.). privately published by Anne Williamson. ISBN 978-0-9527544-4-2. "The book includes: – Campaign Medals. Full history of each medal, including Army Orders, Army Council Instructions & award criteria."
- Williamson, Howard J. (2014). The Great War Medal Collectors Companion Volume II. privately published by Anne Williamson. ISBN 978-0-9527544-5-9.
