= Gallipoli Star (Commonwealth) =

- Type: Decoration
- Eligibility: ANZAC
- Campaign: Gallipoli Campaign
- Status: Cancelled

Highlights
- Total: 200
- Ribbon bar
- Related: 1914–15 Star

The Gallipolli Star is a military decoration proposed by the British Empire; it was never awarded but later privately struck. Originally to have been called the ANZAC Star, it was proposed by Lieutenant General Birdwood for Australian and New Zealand troops who served at Gallipoli. Despite approval by George V, protest at a medal that could not be awarded to other Commonwealth troops who took part in the operation (the majority deployed) was raised by British parliamentarians and media. In 1918, after ribbons, but not medals, had been shipped to the two nations, the award was cancelled and instead eligible soldiers were awarded the 1914 – 1915 Star. In 1990 the award was privately struck with 200 copies being given to Gallipoli veterans and the other 1800 sold to collectors.

== Design ==
The medal was designed by R K Peacock. It was an eight-pointed bronze star (represented NZ and the seven territories of Australia) surrounding a silver disc. On the disc the words "Gallipoli 1914-15" surrounded the King's crown.

The ribbon had a blue centre with yellow on the wearer's right and silver (white) on the left. Between the yellow and blue and between the blue and white there was a narrow stripe of red. Yellow represented the Australian wattle, white the NZ silver fern, blue the ocean and red for the Australian gum blossom and NZ rata.

In 1990, from the original design there were 1000 medals initially privately produced by Ross E. Smith, OAM of Canberra. Of these 200 medals were made as his personal gift to the remaining Gallipoli Veterans of both Australia and New Zealand. However, in order to recoup some of the production expenditure the remaining 800 medals were sold to Suttles Medal P/L Sydney for private sales etc.
