= Calgary Avansino =

American journalist

- Born: 6 May 1975 (age 51)
- Occupation: CEO – Glamcam

Calgary Avansino (born 6 May 1975) is a contributing editor to the British edition of Vogue and Wellbeing expert. After moving to London in 2000, she began a three-week internship at Vogue. Soon after, she was offered the job as assistant to the editor-in-chief, Alexandra Shulman. Two and a half years later, she shifted to the beauty department where she became a beauty assistant, followed by Wellbeing editor, then executive fashion director. Between 2008 and 2013, she was executive fashion and digital project director.

Avansino left her full-time role at Vogue in 2013 to become a contributing editor. She wrote a weekly Wellbeing blog for Vogue, ran her own health and Wellbeing website, and is the author of Keep It Real.

In October 2017, Avansino became the CEO of GLAMCAM.

== Early life ==
Avansino was born in 1975. Brought up on the West Coast of America as a vegetarian, Avansino was taught a great deal about the fundamentals of healthy living by her parents. She went to Cate School and graduated from Georgetown University in 1998. Avansino moved to England in 2000 with her husband. In 2017, Avansino and her family returned to California, United States.

== Career ==
Avansino contributes regularly and has a weekly Wellbeing blog on the Vogue website. Avansino is regularly interviewed in print, online, at events and on television for her thoughts on Wellbeing, exercise, and healthy eating. In February 2016, her debut book Keep It Real: Create a Healthy, Balanced and Delicious Life – For You and Your Family was released.

== Personal life ==
Avansino is married and has three children.
