= Chris Cleave =

British writer and journalist

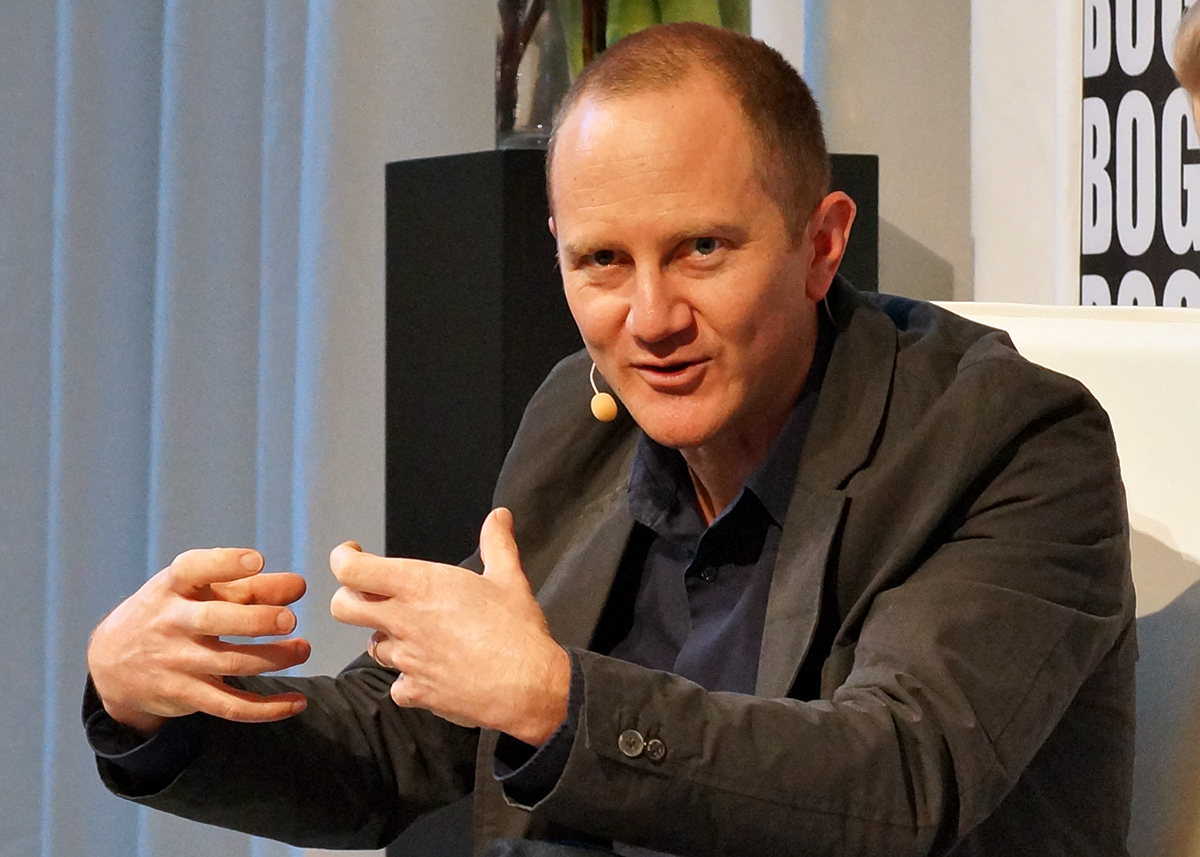
- Born: 14 May 1973 (age 53); London, England
- Education: Balliol College, Oxford
- Occupation: Writer
- Writing career
- Language: English
- Subject: Literary fiction
- Notable works: Incendiary; The Other Hand

Chris Cleave (born 1973) is a British writer and journalist.

== Biography ==
Cleave was born in London on 14 May 1973, brought up in Cameroon and Buckinghamshire, and educated at Dr Challoner's Grammar School and Balliol College, Oxford, where he studied experimental psychology. He lives in the UK with his French wife and three children.

== Writing ==
Cleave's debut novel Incendiary was published in twenty countries and has been adapted into a feature film starring Michelle Williams and Ewan McGregor. The novel won a 2006 Somerset Maugham Award and was shortlisted for the 2006 Commonwealth Writers' Prize. The audiobook version was read by Australian actor Susan Lyons.

His second novel, The Other Hand, was released in August 2008 and was described as "A powerful piece of art... shocking, exciting and deeply affecting... superb" by The Independent. It has been shortlisted for the 2008 Costa Book Awards in the Novel category. Cleave was inspired to write The Other Hand from his childhood in West Africa. It was released in the US and Canada in January 2009 under the title Little Bee.

Gold, his third novel, was called "bold and brave" by The Observer.

Cleave is a columnist for The Guardian in London. From 2008 until 2010 he wrote a column for The Guardian entitled "Down with the kids".

== Bibliography ==
=== Novels ===
- Incendiary (2005)
- The Other Hand (2008, Sceptre), published as Little Bee in the United States and Canada.
- Gold (2012)
- Everyone Brave Is Forgiven (2016)

=== Short stories ===
- "Quiet Time"
- "Fresh Water"
- "Oyster"
