= Incendiary (novel) =

2005 novel by Chris Cleave

- First edition (UK)
- Author: Chris Cleave
- Language: English
- Genre: Literary fiction
- Publisher: Chatto & Windus (UK); Knopf (US)
- Publication date: 7 July 2005 in UK and 2 August 2005 in USA
- Publication place: United Kingdom
- Media type: Print
- Pages: 352
- ISBN: 978-0-307-26282-0

Incendiary is a novel by British writer Chris Cleave. When it was first published in the summer of 2005, it garnered international headlines for the eerie similarity of its plot to the 7 July 2005 London bombings in England carried out on the same day it was published. It won the 2005 Book-of-the-Month Club First Fiction Award. A 2008 film with the same name was based on it.

== Narrative ==
The novel is written as an epistolary first-person novel, in which, the main character, a young mother, writes a letter to Osama bin Laden after a London incendiary bombing.

== Plot summary ==
A young mother's life is blown apart when her husband and four-year-old son are killed during a bombing at a football match. Following this, the young mother falls into a depression. While the young mother tries to battle her depression, she also must fight the guilt of committing adultery the same day of her son's and husband's death.

== Critical reception ==
The Washington Post called it "A mezmering tour de force". New York Times said it was "As benefits good genre fiction, Cleave's characters are sustained, driven and informed by the plot, which dictates and governs all". It also is considered to be "strong, intelligent, heart-breaking and realistic. The author said that principally, the novel is about the feelings of a mother for its children and the aftermath of a terrorist attack.

== Film adaptation ==
The film, loosely based on the book, was released in the UK on Friday, October 24, 2008. It was directed by Sharon Maguire and starring Michelle Williams in the main role, supported by Ewan McGregor as Jasper Black, and Matthew MacFadyen as Terrence Butcher. Unlike the book, the film received poor reviews, receiving 23% of approval in the site Rotten Tomatoes.
