= Ward & Company of London =

British stained glass manufacturer

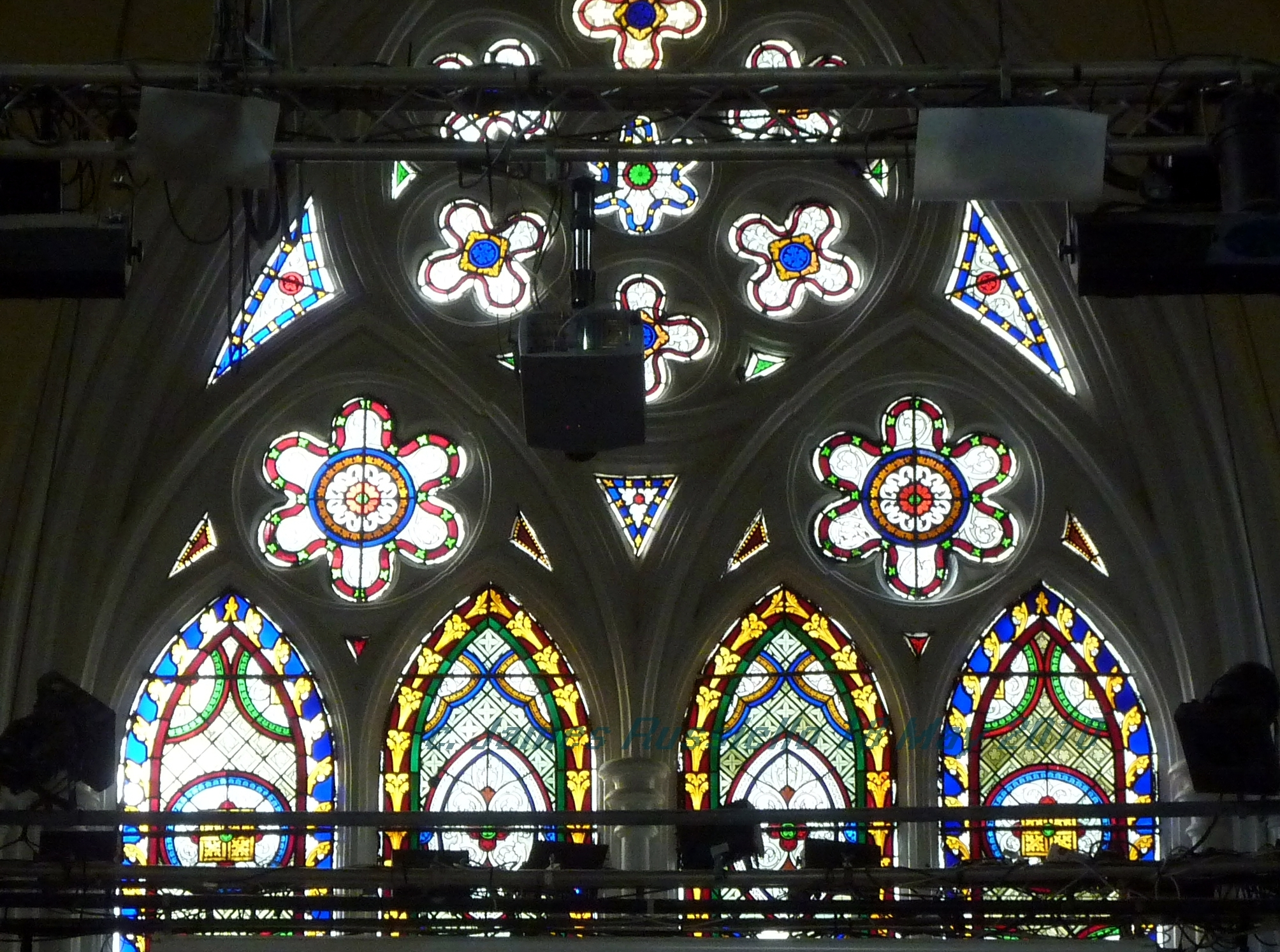
Window in the chancel arch recess of the former Horbury Chapel, now Kensington Temple (London), Notting Hill

Ward & Co. was a London-based stained glass manufacturer in the mid-nineteenth-century that predominantly focused on ecclesiastical commissions. It was the firm of choice for architect John Tarring of London. It is believed to have become defunct before 1863 and operated out of 27 Paternoster Row, London.

== Works ==
- 1848: Windows in the former Horbury Chapel, now Kensington Temple (London)(designed by John Tarring of London)
- 1850: Clapham Grafton Square Congregational Church (designed by John Tarring of London)
- 1857: Linden Grove Chapel (Peckenham Rye) (designed by John Tarring of London)
