= Incendiary (film) =

- Theatrical release poster
- Directed by: Sharon Maguire
- Screenplay by: Sharon Maguire
- Based on: Incendiary by Chris Cleave
- Produced by: Andy Paterson; Anand Tucker; Adrienne Maguire
- Starring: Michelle Williams; Ewan McGregor; Matthew Macfadyen
- Cinematography: Ben Davis
- Edited by: Valerio Bonelli
- Music by: Shigeru Umebayashi
- Distributed by: Optimum Releasing; THINKFilm (United States)
- Release dates: 20 January 2008 (Sundance); 24 October 2008 (UK)
- Running time: 96 minutes
- Country: United Kingdom
- Language: English

Incendiary is a 2008 British drama film written and directed by Sharon Maguire. Based on the 2005 novel Incendiary by Chris Cleave, it stars Michelle Williams as a woman who loses her husband and young son in a terrorist attack at a football match. Ewan McGregor and Matthew Macfadyen co-star. Incendiary premiered at the Sundance Film Festival on 20 January 2008. Upon its release in UK theatres on 24 October 2008, it received mostly negative reviews from critics.

== Plot ==
A young East Ender woman is married to bomb-disposal officer Lenny (Nicholas Gleaves), they have a four-year-old son (Sidney Johnston).

While the young mother is having an affair with a reporter called Jasper Black, Lenny, their son, and about 1000 others are killed in a terrorist attack carried out by six suicide bombers at a football match. Both Jasper and Lenny's boss, Terrence Butcher, who is in charge of the anti-terrorist division, try to comfort the mother. Both are also romantically interested in her.

Through Jasper's investigation into the bombing, the mother discovers the identity of one of the terrorists. She befriends his teenage son, who only knows that his father is missing since the attacks. When he finds out what his father did, he panics and runs, causing the police to suspect him to be a terrorist. When he tries to take something out of his pocket they think he has a gun or wants to trigger a bomb, they shoot at him, but he is unarmed. The mother, who tried to protect him, is wounded, but not severely. Later, the terrorist's wife and son apologize to the mother for his part in the killings.

Terrence confesses to the mother that he knew that a suicide attack was going to happen and could have stopped it, but he did not in order to be able to continue his investigation of the terrorist group. He says that he did not know in which stadium it would happen, and also thought it would be of a smaller scale. Although he knew Lenny and his son would be going, he did not warn them.

Sometimes the mother is confused, thinking that nothing has happened to her son. Throughout the film, for therapeutic reasons, she writes a letter addressed to Osama bin Laden, who is assumed to be responsible for the attack.

In the film's final scenes, the mother has another son by Jasper, who is seen running to the hospital and asking for her at the nursing station.

== Cast ==
- Michelle Williams as Young Mother
- Ewan McGregor as Jasper Black
- Matthew Macfadyen as Terrence Butcher
- Nicholas Gleaves as Lenny
- Sidney Johnston as The Boy
- Usman Khokhar as The Bomber's Son
- Sasha Behar as Mrs. Ghorbani, the Bomber's Wife
- Ed Hughes as Danny Walsh (as Edward Hughes)
- Alibe Parsons as Pearl
- Stewart Wright as Charlie
- Al Hunter Ashton as Male Survivor
- Benjamin Wilkin as Young Policeman
- Steve Leatherbarrow - Policeman
- Robin Berry as Dazed Supporter
- Mercy Ojelade as Nurse Mena
- Joe Marshall as Gary / VT Man
- Dom Garcia - Young Lad on Train Platform

== Production ==
Mainly the book and the film are about this mother’s love for her child and the loss of that child. There is also a policeman, who is essentially a good man who wants to do the right thing but can’t because he’s got an unseen enemy and he has to make decisions that he wouldn’t normally make and it gets him into trouble. Then there’s a journalist who kind of represents the liberal thinkers in society. All liberal thinkers have had to reassess that attitude since 9/11 because the results of free association, free movement, and free expression have put us all in danger in many ways, so everybody’s had to rethink their position. They represent the world before 9/11 and 7/7 and then what happened afterwards, so that’s what it’s about.

— Sharon Maguire

Filming began on 26 March 2007 in London, England. The first filmed scenes were shot on location in Northampton Square and the Brunswick Estate in Islington, North London. Filming also took place at Leyton Orient's Brisbane Road stadium. Filming continued during the week of 30 April 2007 in St Albans, in particular in and around the Cathedral, St Albans School, and Westminster Lodge.

The production also visited The Metropolitan Training College facilities near Gravesend to shoot the scenes at the football stadium, after the bomb has exploded.

== Reception ==
The film received generally negative reviews from critics. Tom Charity, after viewing the film at the 2008 Sundance Film Festival, gave it one star out of five and called it an "ambitious/opportunistic effort that misses the mark, from the one-dimensional characters to the craven plotting and sentimental tone."

Philip French called it an "ambitious British picture on an urgent topical subject [that] is torpedoed by a poor script."

Time Out gave it two stars out of six, saying "there are so many things wrong with writer-director Sharon Maguire’s first film since Bridget Jones's Diary in 2001 that it's hard to know where to start, but the fatal problem is that this is a film with an identity crisis"; the film at times seems like a "study of guilt and grief" and at other times a "conspiracy thriller" but "ends up being a compendium of bizarre diversions, most of which are utterly surplus to the film’s half-cocked desire to stick with the experience and emotions of its main character."
