= Sarah Tooley =

English journalist and biographer

One of Tooley's best-known works was her Life of Florence Nightingale (1904).

Sarah Anne Tooley (née Southall; 1856–1946) was an English journalist and biographer particularly known for her celebrity interviews.

== Early life ==
She was born Sarah Anne Southall at Brierley Hill, Staffordshire, on 5 July 1856, daughter of glass and china dealer Thomas Southall and his wife Anne, née Lewis. Her parents died when she was young, and she lived with relatives in London. She attended Greenhill House boarding school in Stourbridge, Worcestershire, and then two years of literary classes run by Henry Morley at University College London.

On 15 March 1882, she married Baptist minister George Tooley and moved with him to Dumfries. When his work was hindered by a spinal complaint, Mrs Tooley began writing to supplement their income, and they moved to London so that she could pursue a journalistic career.

== Career ==
Tooley’s popularity as a celebrity interviewer was established in 1893 with her interview with reformer Teruko Sono in Christian Weekly. A variety of papers carried her interviews, especially The Woman’s Signal, The Young Woman, and Woman at Home. Her subjects included writers Frances Hodgson Burnett, Sarah Grand, and Walter Besant, designers William Morris and Gertrude Jekyll, scientists Margaret Lindsay Huggins and Elizabeth Garrett Anderson, and feminist campaigners Josephine Butler and Clementina Black as well as feminist economist Beatrice Webb. Her writing emphasises women’s rights, especially when writing for the more feminist Woman’s Signal.

Her book-length works mainly focused on royal subjects, especially the popular Personal Life of Queen Victoria. She is particularly noted for contributing to research into Florence Nightingale with her Life of Florence Nightingale and History of Nursing in the British Empire.

She died on 24 December 1946.

== Works ==
- Lives, Great and Simple (1884)
- Life of Harriet Beecher Stowe (1893)
- The Personal Life of Queen Victoria (1897)
- The Life of Queen Alexandra (1902)
- Royal Palaces and their Memories (1902)
- Life of Florence Nightingale (1904)
- The History of Nursing in the British Empire (1906)
- The Royal Family, by Pen and Camera (1907)
