= H. Taprell Dorling =

British naval officer and writer (1883–1968)

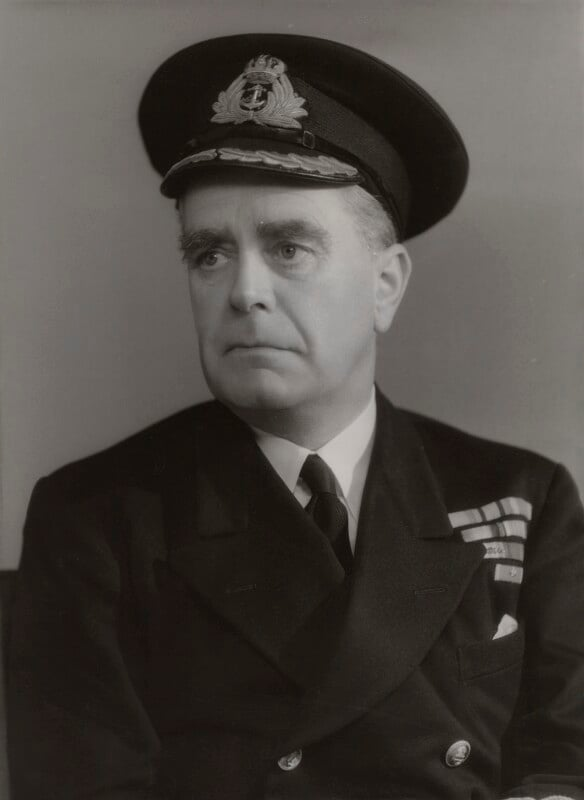
Dorling in 1940

Captain Henry Taprell Dorling (1883–1968) was a British sailor, author, and journalist who served in the Royal Navy during both World War One and World War Two, giving his marine fact and fiction a notable authenticity. His Pincher Martin, O.D. (1916) is widely referenced as the source for Pincher Martin (1956) by Nobel prizewinner William Golding. He wrote under the name Taffrail.

== Naval career ==
Dorling was born in Berwick, the second son of Colonel Francis Dorling, and named Taprell Henry, but later changed the order of his names. He entered HMS Britannia in August 1897, his 1113 marks placing him fifty-eighth in merit among the sixty-three candidates accepted as naval cadets. By then an acting sub-lieutenant, he was in late September 1902 transferred to the seagoing training brig HMS Dolphin.

He was promoted to the rank of lieutenant on 31 December 1904, and commander on 31 December 1916. The following year he was appointed in command of the new R-class destroyer HMS Telemachus in her first commission.

== Bibliography ==
In addition to his novels, novelettes, and non-fiction books, Dorling also wrote short stories for magazines such as The Royal Magazine.

Dorling wrote three types of books: adult fiction, books about naval operations, and juvenile fiction.

The following list is drawn from the Jisc Library Hub Discover catalogue. This is an online database that collates 161 UK and Irish academic, national & specialist library catalogues. Nevertheless, this catalogue is not exhaustive, and three titles drawn from searches on Abe Books, a site for the used-book trade, are included.

Books by Dorling in the Jisc Library Hub Discover Catalogue
No	Year	Title	Illustrator	Publisher	Pages	Notes
1	1912	All about ships: a book for boys		Cassell & Co, London	xii, 371 pages, 4 col plates, drawings, photos, (8º)	
2	1915	The Boy Castaways; or, Endeavour Island	William Rainey	Blackie & Son, London	vi, 360 pages, (8º)	
4	1916	Carry on!: naval sketches and stories		C. A. Pearson, London	[6], 122 p., 19 cm.	
7	1916	Pincher Martin, O.D.: a story of the inner life of the Royal Navy. By 'Taffrail	Clifford Fleming-Williams	W. & R. Chambers, London	340 p., 20 cm.	
3	1916	Service medals, ribbons, badges and flags		George Philip & Son, London	In 4 parts: [6], 86, 48, 48, 45 p. : illustrations (some color), 18 cm.	(Note: Dorling produced many different versions of this.)
5	1916	Stand By!: naval sketches and stories		C. A. Pearson, London	120 pages, (8º)	
6	1916	The secret submarine: a story of fighting by sea and land	C. M. Padday	Blackie & Son, London	352 pages, (8º)	
10	1917	Minor Operations		C. A. Pearson, London	120 p., 20 cm.	
9	1917	Off Shore		C. A. Pearson, London	121 p., 18 cm.	
11	1917	Sea, Spray and Spindrift: naval yarns	W. Edward Wigfull, Neville Southeby Pitcher	C. A. Pearson, London	159 pages : illustrations, (8º)	
8	1917	The sub: being the autobiography of David Munro, sub-lieutenant, Royal Navy		Hodder & Stoughton, London	356 p. : 5 leaves of plates, 20 cm.	
13	1918	A Little Ship		W. & R. Chambers, London	337 pages, (8º)	
12	1918	The watch below: naval sketches and stories		C. A. Pearson, London	121 p., 18 cm.	
14	1920	H.M.S. anonymous		H. Jenkins, London	320 p., 19 cm.	
15	1920	Oh, Joshua!		Hodder & Stoughton, London	318, [2]p., 19 cm.	
16	1925	Sea venturers of Britain		W. Collins, London	xix, 316 p. : plates, ports., maps (part. fold.), 19 cm.	
17	1927	Sea Escapes and Adventures		P. Allan & Co, London	286 pages, (8º)	
20	1929	Men o' war: St. Vincent, Cochrane, Marryat, Fisher, Beresford		P. Allan & Co, London	308 p. : illustrations, maps., 22 cm.	
19	1929	Pirates		Hodder & Stoughton, London	311 pages, (8º)	
18	1929	Shipmates		Hodder & Stoughton, London	316 pages, (8º)	
21	1930	The lonely bungalow		Hodder & Stoughton, London	320 p., 19 cm.	
23	1931	Endless story: being an account of the work of the destroyers, flotilla-leaders, torpedo-boats and patrol boats in the great war		Hodder & Stoughton, London	451 p : illus, 25 cm.	
22	1931	Kerrell		Hodder & Stoughton, London	319 p. : illustrations, 19 cm.	
24	1932	Cypher K		Hodder & Stoughton, London	315 pages, (8º)	
25	1932	The scarlet stripe: being the adventures of a naval surgeon		Hodder & Stoughton, London	310 p. : plan, 18 cm	
26	1933	Dover-Ostend: a cross channel thriller		Hodder & Stoughton, London	351 p. : 1 map, 19 cm.	
27	1933	The man from Scapa Flow		Hodder & Stoughton, London	320 pages, (8º)	
28	1934	Seventy North (70º N)		Hodder & Stoughton, London	319 p., 20 cm.	
29	1935	Second Officer		Hodder & Stoughton, London	310 p., 20 cm.	
30	1935	Swept channels: being an account of the work of the minesweepers in the Great War.		Hodder & Stoughton, London	388 pages, (8º)	
31	1935	Second Officer		Hodder & Stroughton, London		(Note: From a listing on Abe Books, not found on the Jisc catalogue.)
32	1936	Mid-Atlantic		Hodder & Stoughton, London	318, [1] p., 20 cm.	
33	1936	Mystery at Milford Haven		Hodder & Stoughton, London	319 pages, (8º)	
34	1937	Mystery Cruise		Hodder & Stoughton, London	320 p., 20 cm.	
35	1938	Operation 'M.O.'		Hodder & Stoughton, London	288 pages, (8º)	
36	1938	Micheal Bray		Hodder & Stroughton, London		(Note: From a listing on Abe Books, not found on the Jisc catalogue.)
37	1939	Fred Travis, A.B.		Hodder & Stoughton, London	336 p., 20 cm.	
38	1939	The Shetland plan		Hodder & Stoughton, London	256 p. : maps, 19 cm	
39	1940	The navy in action		Hodder & Stoughton, London	224 p., 19 cm.	
40	1940	The Navy is here: a convoy of naval novels		Hodder & Stoughton, London	753 p., 8º.	
41	1943	Chenies		Hodder & Stoughton, London	282 p., 20 cm.	
42	1943	White Ensigns		G. P. Putnam's Sons, New York	280 p.	(Note: From a listing on Abe Books, not found on the Jisc catalogue.)
43	1946	Ribbons and medals, naval, military, air force and civil		George Philip & Son, London	viii, 208 p., illustrated, xvi color plates on 9 leaves; 19 cm	
44	1947	Western Mediterranean, 1942-1945		Hodder & Stroughton, London	461p. : illustrations, 8 volumes	
45	1949	Toby Shad		Hodder & Stoughton, London	317 p., 20 cm.	
46	1951	The jade lizard		Hodder & Stoughton, London	256 p., 19 cm.	
47	1952	Salt water quiz		Hodder and Stoughton, London	157 p., illustrated, 20 cm	
48	1952	The new moon		Hodder & Stoughton, London	254 p., 19 cm.	
49	1953	The Hurlingham Club, 1869-1953		Hurlingham Club, London	69 p., illustrated, 21 cm.	
50	1953	Euridice		Hodder & Stoughton, London	286 pages, (12º) 19x13cm, red cloth hardcover, original price 12/6	
51	1956	Arctic convoy		Hodder & Stoughton, London	315 p., 21 cm.	
52	1973	Blue Star Line at war, 1939-1945		Foulsham, Slough	159, xiii p, : illustrated, maps (1 color), ports, 23 cm.	
53	1974	Ribbons and medals: the world's military and civil awards		George Philip & Son, London	359 pages : illustrations (some colour), 23 cm	(Note: Enlarged edition revised under the editorship of Francis K. Mason)
