= One Morning Like a Bird =

2008 novel by Andrew Miller

- Author: Andrew Miller
- Language: English
- Genre: Bildungsroman
- Publisher: Sceptre
- Publication date: 4 August 2008
- Publication place: England
- Media type: Print
- Pages: 373
- ISBN: 978-0-340-82514-3
- OCLC: 230989513
- Preceded by: The Optimists (2005)
- Followed by: Pure (2011)

One Morning Like a Bird is the fifth novel by English author, Andrew Miller, released on 4 September 2008 through Sceptre. The novel received mostly positive reviews.

== Plot ==
Yuji Takano is a writer in 1940s Tokyo. The story focuses on Takano's exploration and discovery of "Western" culture, exemplified in the meetings of the "club" which he forms with his French-speaking friends. The novel examines the effects on Takano's life and relationships of the impending events of World War II, and the possibility of conscription.

== Reception ==
Miller details conventional middle-class Tokyo life with such intricacy that it is something of a relief when larger events outside Yuji's carefully constructed self-image forcefully intrude and reveal the irony of his pose.

— Isobel Montgomery, The Guardian

The novel received mostly positive acclaim, with reviewers praising Miller's evocation of the Eastern world and its intricacies; and Miller's "delicate" prose. Detractors of the novel cited two-dimensional characters and some confusing moments as the main faults.

In a review for Pop Matters, David Pullar stated the novel was "clever, responsible and just plain well-written"; that it is an "imaginative and profound reflection on Japanese identity in the early days of the Second World War"; stating of the novel as a whole "Miller’s depiction of a Japanese world that largely passed with the American occupation is vivid and enticing" and awarding it a score of eight out of ten. Reviewing for The Daily Telegraph, Helen Brown felt the novel was "convincingly Japanese", stating "there are moments of beauty, truth and irony" and "Miller places his words and plot developments carefully". She did, however, find the "distillation of things down to their universal essence can slow the pace" and found that she "got a bit bored following Yuji about the city". Peter Carty, reviewing for The Independent, stated "Miller's trademark is silken prose which gleams with acutely rendered detail" and that "when this stylistic fluency is brought to bear on Yuji, the result is a character so well realised as to engage all of our sympathies". He does temper this somewhat, however, stating, of the novel as a whole, "mostly, he is supremely successful, although his massings of humanity can be confusing, and there is a sense of a frustrating compression".

In another review for The Telegraph, reviewer Harriet Paterson viewed the novel in a more critical light. She stated that "Yuji remains an unremarkable figure", that "Miller does quite a line in tortured males, but in this case Yuji's self-absorbed ennui is not interesting enough to carry the narrative" and that the plot continues "without [him] ever fleshing out into a three-dimensional character". Paterson did find that parts of the novel were written in a "delicate prose", however found that "they are too sporadic to create an overall texture". In conclusion she states "The obvious enjoyment with which Miller brought the 18th century to life for his books Casanova and Ingenious Pain is missing. The drama of the historical setting gets lost along the way, having promised a more compelling novel than ultimately emerges".
