= The Optimists (novel) =

2005 novel by Andrew Miller

- Author: Andrew Miller
- Language: English
- Genre: Fictional prose
- Publisher: Sceptre
- Publication date: 21 March 2005
- Publication place: England
- Media type: Print
- Pages: 313
- ISBN: 978-0-340-82512-9
- OCLC: 59195375
- Preceded by: Oxygen (2001)
- Followed by: One Morning Like a Bird (2008)

The Optimists is the fourth novel by English author, Andrew Miller, released on 21 March 2005 through Sceptre.

== Plot ==
The novel focuses on a veteran photojournalist named Clement Glass, and his struggle to come to terms with the aftermath of a church massacre. Although these events take place in an undisclosed African location, there are close similarities to Rwanda and the genocide of 1994. The novel follows Glass as he travels from Africa to locations in Europe and North America, and tries to reconcile his memories, while dealing with a family crisis, eventually journeying to Brussels, where the perpetrator of the massacre may be in hiding.

== Reception ==
The novel received mixed reviews, with some critics praising the novels meditative approach and striking imagery and detractors citing the unsettling themes of the book being left unresolved as the main transgression.

Reviewing for The Seattle Times, Michael Upchurch praised "a narrative that is alive, unpredictable and stirringly deep", stating that he found the "orchestration" of the protagonist's "flailing movements" "impeccable" and stated, of the novel as a whole; "it takes on its chosen terrain head-on and renders it into a shifting, complex fiction". In a review for The Observer, Stephanie Merritt commented on the difference between he language in this novel and Millers previous, historical, offerings, stating "his prose here is deliberately unadorned, an accumulation of observed detail in brief, one-clause sentences to create scenes of photographic reality.". She does note that this level of detail sometimes "weighs a little too heavily", however found the novel, as a whole, to be "profound" and "meditative", stating "it leaves the reader with a feeling of courage and, in the face of so much evidence to the contrary, hope.". Publishers Weekly also reviewed the novel in a positive light, finding the novel to be a "powerful study of emotional trauma" and "starkly illustrative".

James Buchan, reviewing for The Guardian, was less positive of the novel. He stated that "the tempo of the narrative is slow and, like the adagio movement for a violinist, quite unforgiving of faults of technique and judgment [sic].". Buchan also found the important scenes were not imbued by Miller with enough weight, stating "Big Themes are the curse of modern English fiction, and Miller may decide they are not, in the end, for him.". The novel was reviewed twice in The Daily Telegraph, neither of which positive. Kate Chisholm stated that while "Miller's writing is full of clever insights" she found that "in the end I felt uneasy", citing Millers "attempt to persuade us of moral equivalence" as the main factor for this. Additionally, Theo Tait also found the vastly varying themes to be the novels main detractor, stating "The book ricochets uneasily between moods and settings." and that "Miller's attempts to link the Somerset story to Africa are less satisfactory.". He does, however, state that "It is a testament to the author's skill and intelligence that The Optimists is never quite as jolting as it sounds.". In a review for The Spectator, Sebastian Smee offered the same sort of critique, stating "Much of [the novel] is sophisticated and provocative, but it feels like an intrusion in the midst of a promising fiction. It is too persistent, too indiscreet." and concluding with "Miller is a fine writer, but The Optimists is a moral voice in search of a convincing fiction.".
