= The Crossing (Miller novel) =

2015 novel by Andrew Miller

- First edition
- Author: Andrew Miller
- Cover artist: Brian Stauffer
- Language: English
- Publisher: Sceptre
- Publication date: 2015
- Publication place: United Kingdom
- Media type: Print
- Pages: 336
- ISBN: 1 44475-349-5

The Crossing is the seventh novel by English novelist Andrew Miller published in 2015 by Sceptre, an imprint by Hodder & Stoughton. It was recommended by the Financial Times as being one of the best books in 2015.

== Plot ==
Maud is a biology student at Bristol University where she is an active member of the university sailing club. While working on a yacht in a dry dock she falls and is rushed to hospital by air ambulance. Meanwhile, Tim, a wealthy fellow student and guitarist (with an original Lacôte) sees her fall and visits her at the hospital. They marry and have a child Zoe, and then buy a Nicholson 32, a 32-foot ocean-going yacht called Lodestar. Tragedy then strikes and Maud single-handedly sets off across the Atlantic and encounters a violent storm.

== Reception ==
- Kate Clanchy writing in The Guardian highlights both Tim and Maud. Firstly Tim: "the dilettante musician desperately in search of the purpose and self-definition... The story of Tim’s narcissism, self-deception and deception, and of the chiming treacheries of his friends and family, is rich and delicate enough to have sufficed for most contemporary novels.". Then later Maud: "nose to nose with Maud and desperate for intimacy, for narration, for stories, for a redemptive ending. Miller delivers instead a finale perhaps more original than it is satisfying, but one that guarantees that Maud, and questions about Maud, will linger in your mind long after you close this remarkable novel."
- Lucy Scholes from The Independent enjoyed the first half of the novel but is not as satisfied with the remainder: "Much of the pleasure of these early sections of The Crossing, comes from learning to keep step with the strange, sparse lull of the prose. What unfurls is a portrait of the couple's partnership seen from Tim's perspective that cleverly appears to be asking us to sympathise with him as he struggles to access Maud's interiority, but actually with every turn of the page, the reader becomes more and more intrigued by Maud herself...Then, without warning, tragedy strikes, and the entire fabric of the novel is torn asunder. The narrative viewpoint spins on its axis as Tim disappears from the story and we're left alone with Maud, who quite literally sets out to sea...I found myself wishing Miller had stayed closer to the novel I'd been reminded of initially, as ultimately, once Tim abandons ship the narrative flounders."
- Francesca Wade writing in the Financial Times also contrasts the two halves on the novel: "Miller’s writing is assured, often poetic, remaining evocative even when a splurge of sailing terminology threatens to submerge his lyricism among its winches, jury-rigging and backing plates. His structure — perfectly linear yet radically fragmented — tests the extremes to which one character’s trajectory can lead, and each half is strangely gripping in very different ways. But the combination feels disjointed, and it’s disconcerting for a reader to adjust abruptly from the suburban to the nautical, from provincial English domesticity to the exotic harbour, inhabited by a tribe of shamanistic children, where Maud washes up after 50 days at sea." and concludes "The Crossing is deeply intriguing but ultimately frustrating: as if, through deliberate perversion, it never quite fulfils its mysterious potential."
