= Now All Roads Lead to France =

2011 biography of Edward Thomas by Matthew Hollis

- Hardcover version cover
- Author: Matthew Hollis
- Language: English
- Subject: Edward Thomas
- Publisher: Faber & Faber (UK); W. W. Norton Company (US)
- Publication place: United Kingdom

Now All Roads Lead To France is a 2011 non-fiction book by Matthew Hollis. It details the life of Edward Thomas, a seminal poet in the history of British literature known for his work exploring the notions of disconnection and unsettledness. Reviews praising the book ran in publications such as The Guardian, The Independent, and The Wall Street Journal. The book won the 2011 Costa Book Award for 'Best Biography', with the judges calling it "brilliant", as well as the 2011 H. W. Fisher Best First Biography Prize.

== Contents ==
The book is biographical in nature and details the life of Edward Thomas before poetry, turning to poetry, the times of war, and his final days, including a reflection of the impact of his work.

Hollis gives a detailed picture of Thomas' life and the poet's inner struggles. Thomas, Hollis writes, suffered through chronic depression, with Thomas stating that he felt "plagued with work, burning my candle at 3 ends" with frequent thoughts of suicide and vicious verbal sparring with his wife Helen. Walking through the English countrysides offered Thomas some relief. Still, it took Thomas' meeting with Robert Frost, an immigrant from the U.S. seeking to break into English literary circles, in 1913 to change his life's path.

Frost's relationship to Thomas, as Hollis discusses, essentially saved Thomas' life. Their friendship serves as the heart of the book. Hollis details how the two poets spent hours "talks-walking", in Frost's words, around the bucolic areas of Gloucestershire to think. Thomas wrote in September 1914, "I am slowly growing into a conscious Englishman."

In a short space of about two years, Thomas published as much as other poets took a lifetime to write. His work, Hollis recounts, conveyed his deep sense of wandering insecurity and lack of connection, particularly using his emotional reflections based on nature. Hollis describes how the advent of World War I, the horrors of which Thomas knew well, brought out a profound purpose in Thomas' mind. Commissioned as a second lieutenant in the British army, Thomas sought out action in 1917, and he died from the shock-wave of a passing shell just about ten weeks after arriving on the Western Front.

== Reception ==
Supportive reviews ran in a variety of publications. Travel writer Robert Macfarlane summed up the book for The Guardian by writing, "An impressive new view of Edward Thomas helps us to understand how much more there is to the poet than willow-herb and meadowsweet". He also commented that Hollis' "narrative is calm and discreet, his tone witty and scholarly", and "he is unsentimentally candid about his subject's troubles and solipsism." The Independent published praise from writer Sean O'Brian; O'Brian remarked, "In this extremely readable critical-biographical study, place and landscape have an importance equal to poetry."

Author and journalist Allan Massie wrote a positive review in The Wall Street Journal. He stated about Thomas that once he "took to poetry at age 36, it was as if the ice on a winter river had melted and the water could flow freely." Massie concluded about the book,

"Hollis gives as full an account of Thomas's life as may be possible. He treats his family difficulties sympathetically, recounts, without innuendo or prurience, loving relationships with two other women besides his wife, notes Thomas's difficulties with his father and his inability to understand his own son. Yet this book is essentially a study of the making of a poet, and Mr. Hollis's chief interest is in the poems themselves. It is a very intelligent and sympathetic study."

The book won the 2011 Costa Book Award for 'Best Biography'. The judges commented: "Dramatic and engrossing. A brilliant biography that moved us all." It also won the 2011 H. W. Fisher Best First Biography Prize.

The 2011 Costa awards were subject to some attention from bookmakers. They offered odds of 2/1 for favourite Now All Roads Lead To France to win as overall 'Book of the Year' and odds of 3/1 for novelist Andrew Miller's Pure. Pure narrowly won out, the judging panel having been locked in a "fierce debate and quite bitter dissent" and eventually using a vote to decide on the winner.

== See also ==
- 2011 in literature
- Costa Book Awards
- Matthew Hollis
