= The Land in Winter =

2025 novel by Andrew Miller

- Author: Andrew Miller
- Language: English
- Publisher: Sceptre
- Publication date: 2024
- Publication place: UK
- Pages: 384
- Awards: Booker Prize (shortlisted)
- ISBN: 1529354277

The Land in Winter is a 2024 novel by English novelist Andrew Miller published by Sceptre, an imprint of Hodder & Stoughton. The novel tells the story of two young married couples living in the British West Country during the Big Freeze of 1963 – one of the coldest winters on record in the United Kingdom – with the narrative spanning December 1962 to February 1963.

The novel won the 2025 Walter Scott Prize for Historical Fiction. The judges said the novel "painted big themes on a subtle canvas of tiny detail" and described its prose as being "as softly dazzling as the snow of the 1962/63 winter in which the novel is set". The 1962–3 setting fell just within the Prize's definition of "historical" as being at least sixty years earlier. Miller had been shortlisted for the Prize twice before.

The novel was shortlisted for the 2025 Booker Prize, with the judges describing it a "dazzling chronicle of the human heart".

Miller described the process of writing the novel as liberating, because "I didn’t worry much about themes. As long as there was a good forward energy, I was happy just to follow it. One of my guiding intentions – a central one – was to let my four main characters have the freedom to see out their parts in whatever way was right for them. No one was going to be shoved around by plot."

== Synopsis ==
Irene Parry and her Husband Eric live in a country cottage in the West Country of Britain during the early 1960s. Eric is one of two general practitioners in the area and his wife stays at home. Irene, originally from London, feels bored and out of place in the countryside.

Another young, married couple, Rita Simmons and her husband Bill, live on a nearby farm. They are new arrivals to the West Country. Bill bought the dairy farm rashly upon leaving Oxford University without a degree and is overwhelmed by and ill-prepared for his new role as a farmer. His wife, Rita, was a dancer in a club in Bristol and, like Irene, she also feels out of place in her new setting.

Both Rita and Irene are newly pregnant, and form a friendship after Rita gifts Irene some eggs from their farm.

Eric is cheating on his wife with Alison, his married patient.

Eric and Irene hold a party for Boxing Day in 1962. They invite friends and acquaintances, including Alison and her husband. The interactions between the characters reach a climax during the party; they become more drunk as it progresses, while outside, a large blizzard is forming.

== Reception ==
Writing for The Times Literary Supplement, Jude Cook said that the two couples' development, with their transition from socially traditional values to becoming sexually bold, was intimately depicted in the work and added tension to the plot.

Reviewing the book for The Guardian, novelist Rachel Seiffert said that Miller dramatically depicted life in early 1960s England, with the repercussions of World War II and the Holocaust still present. In her words, "It is a mark of Miller's skill that he makes spare mention of either, and yet they loom large." She also said that despite these past horrors and the snowy backdrop, this is not a bleak book, as the reader is drawn to sympathise with the flawed characters and hope that they will overcome their difficulties.

Writing for the Financial Times, Lucy Scholes said that the characters' inner upheavals and conflicts were depicted with great tenderness, and that "the delicate attention Miller affords his characters’ inner lives makes for incredibly satisfying reading."
