= Fontaine des Innocents =

Monumental public fountain in Paris

Coordinates: 48.86065°N 2.348011°E

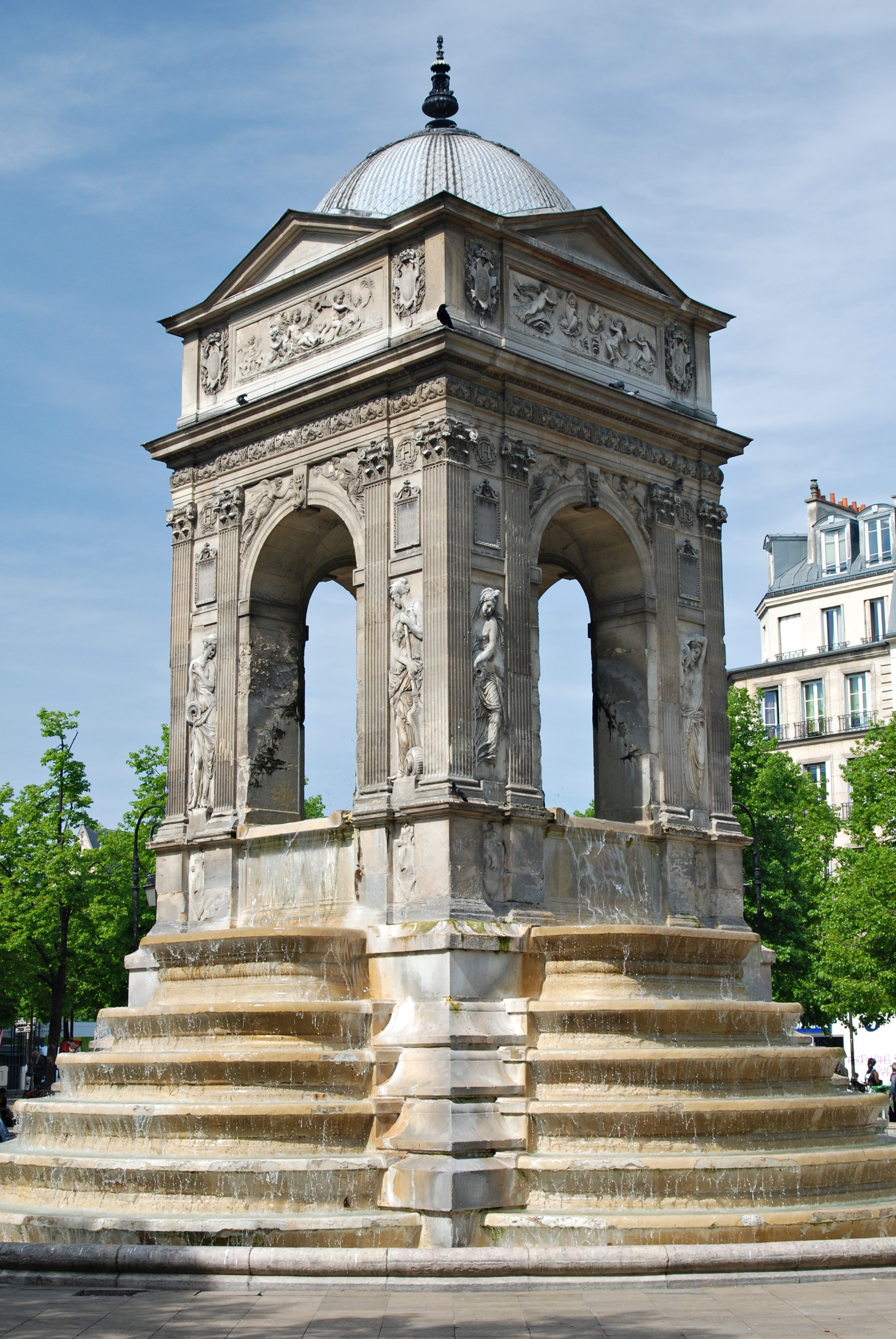
Fontaine des Innocents

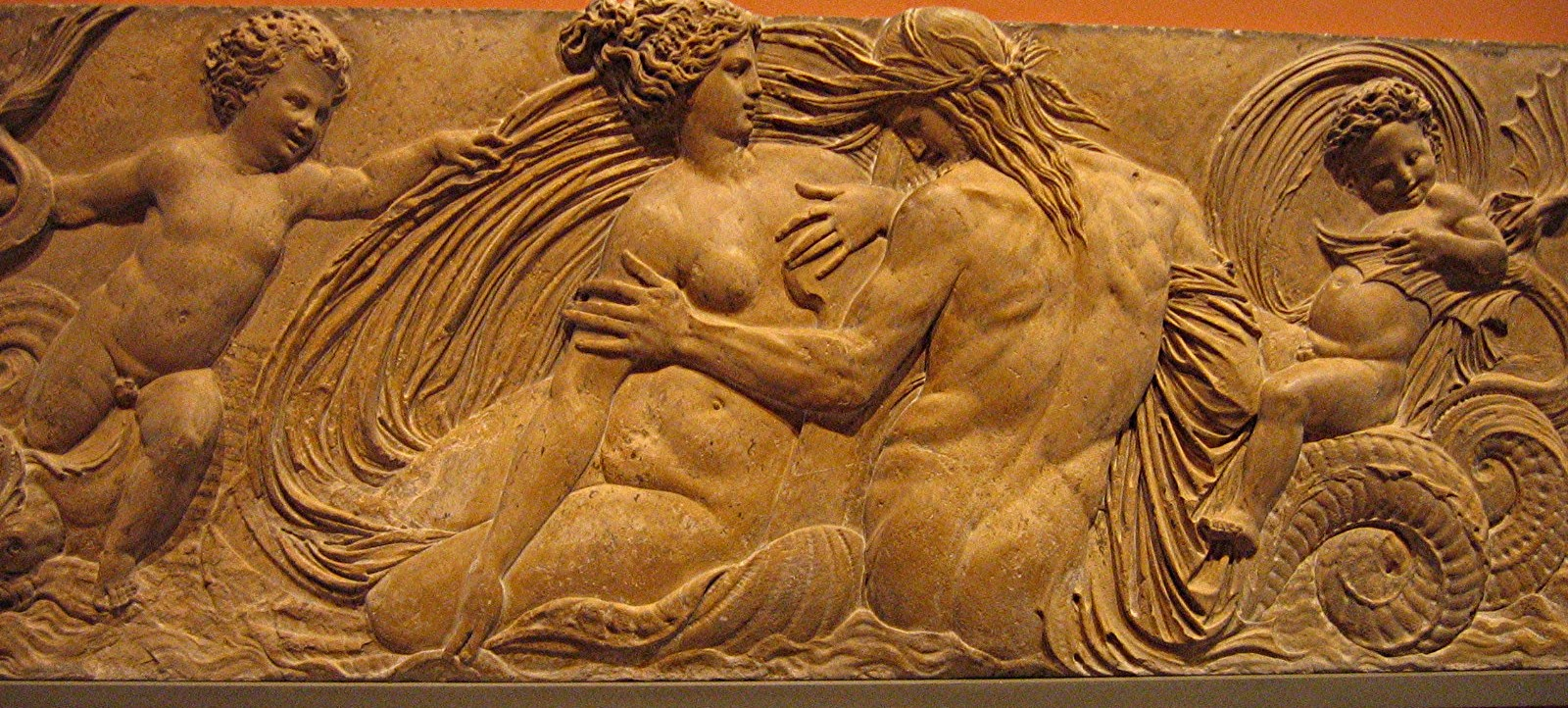
Bas-relief of a Nymph and a Triton (now in the Louvre)

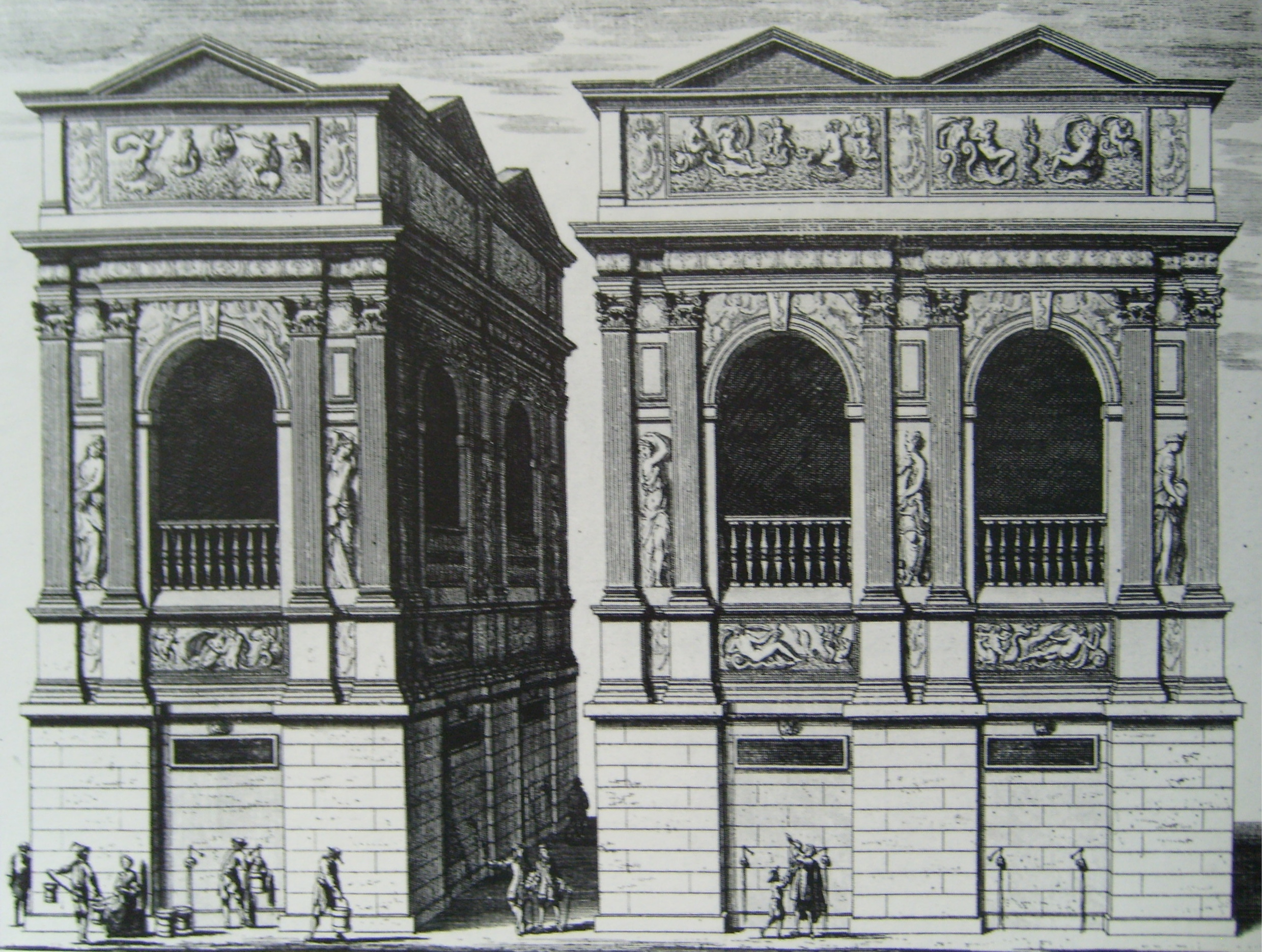
Front and side views of Fontaine des Innocents in its original form, ca. 1670

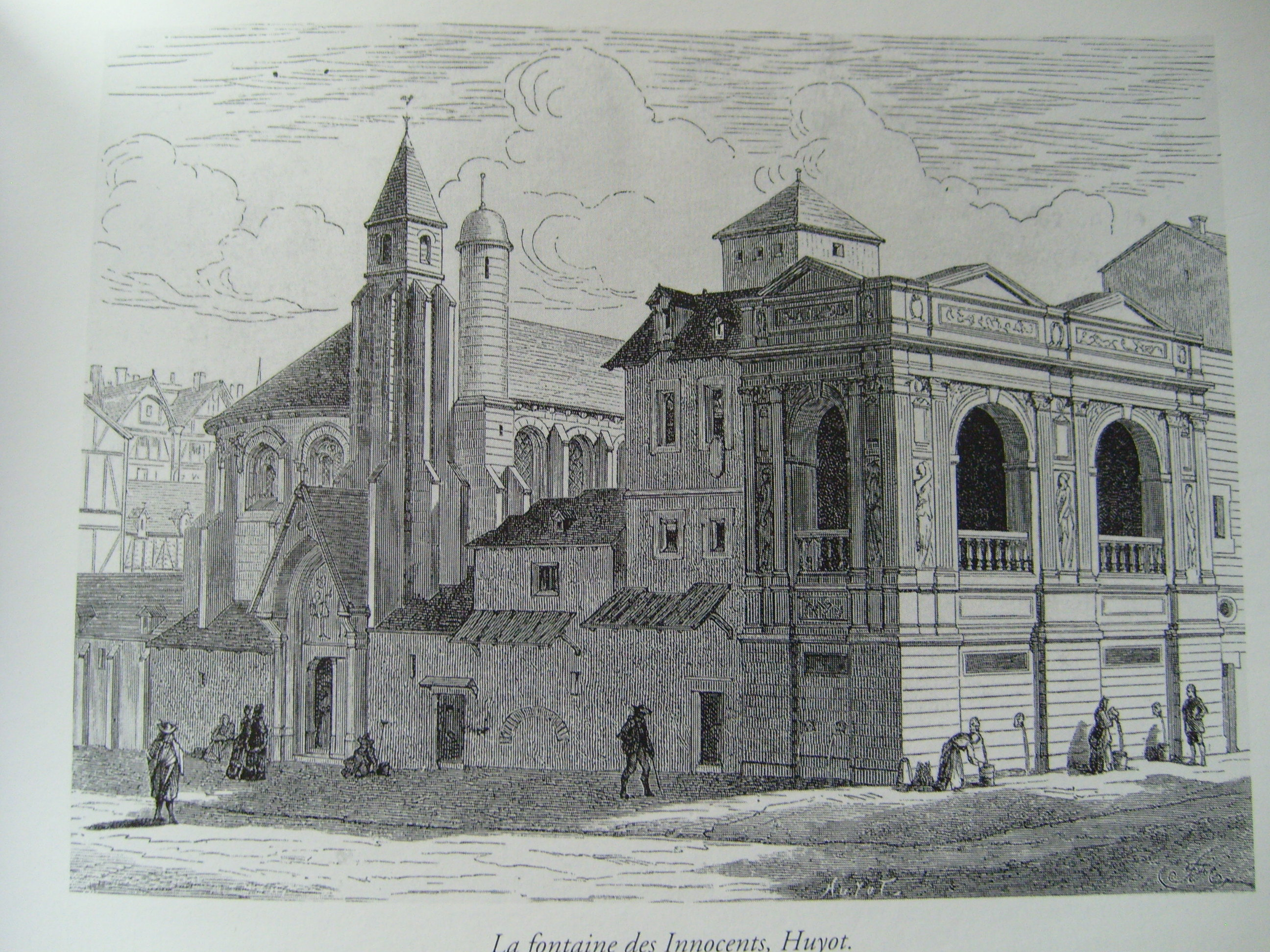
Fontaine des Innocents in its original location in the 17th century (19th-century engraving)

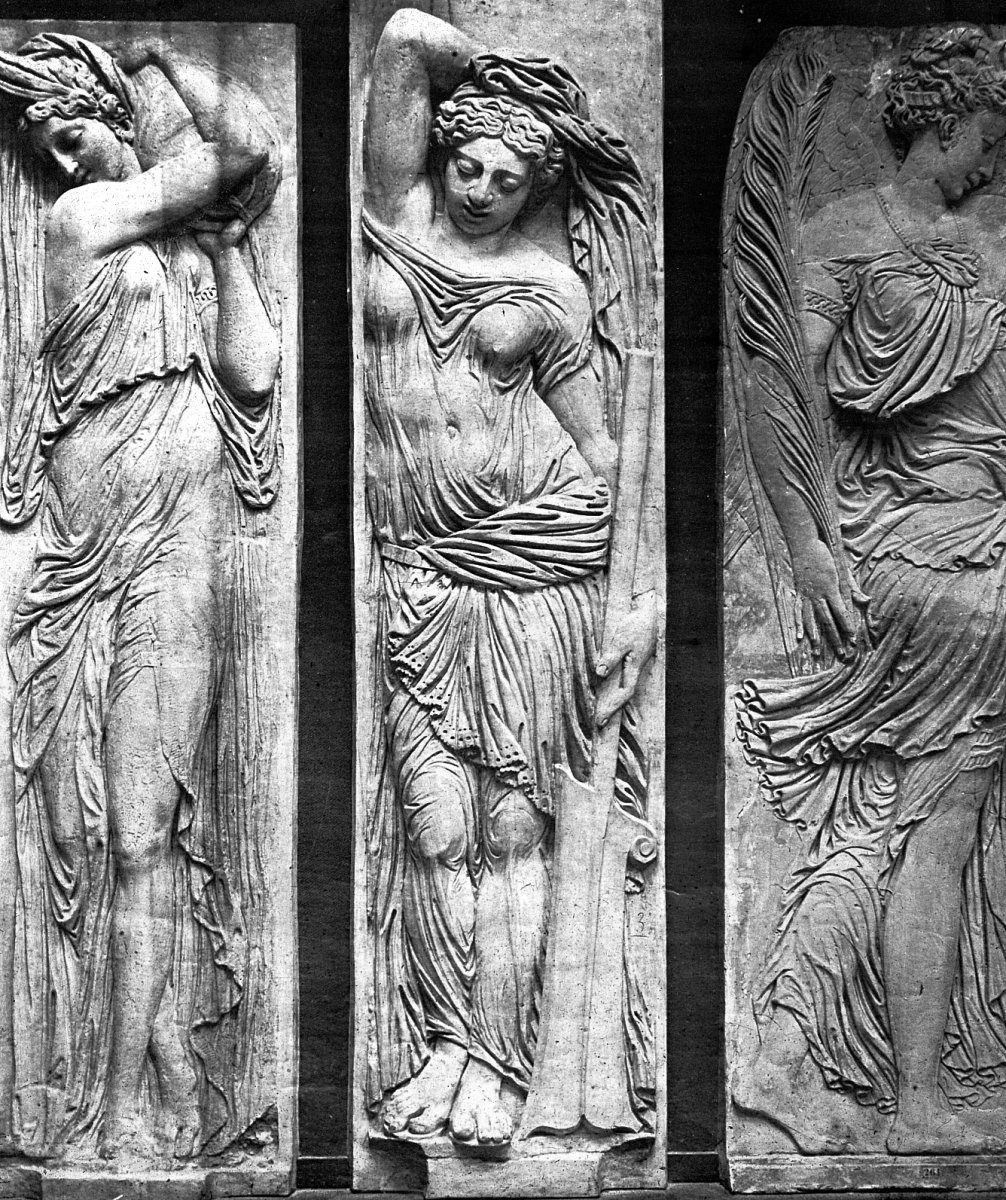
Fontaine des Innocents [reliefs]; Louvre, Paris. Brooklyn Museum Archives, Goodyear Archival Collection

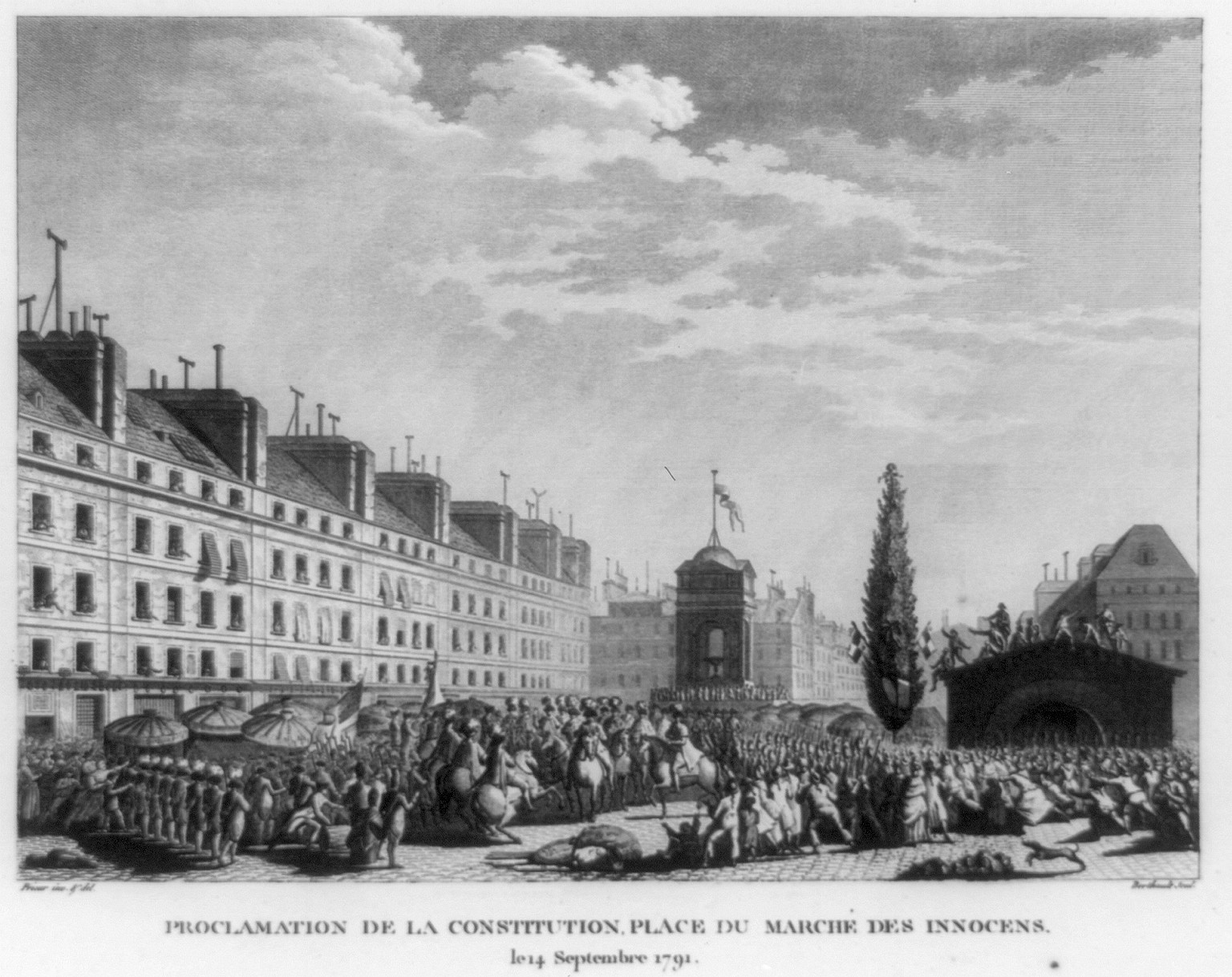
The fountain as it appeared in 1791 when the French constitution was proclaimed on the Marché des Innocents

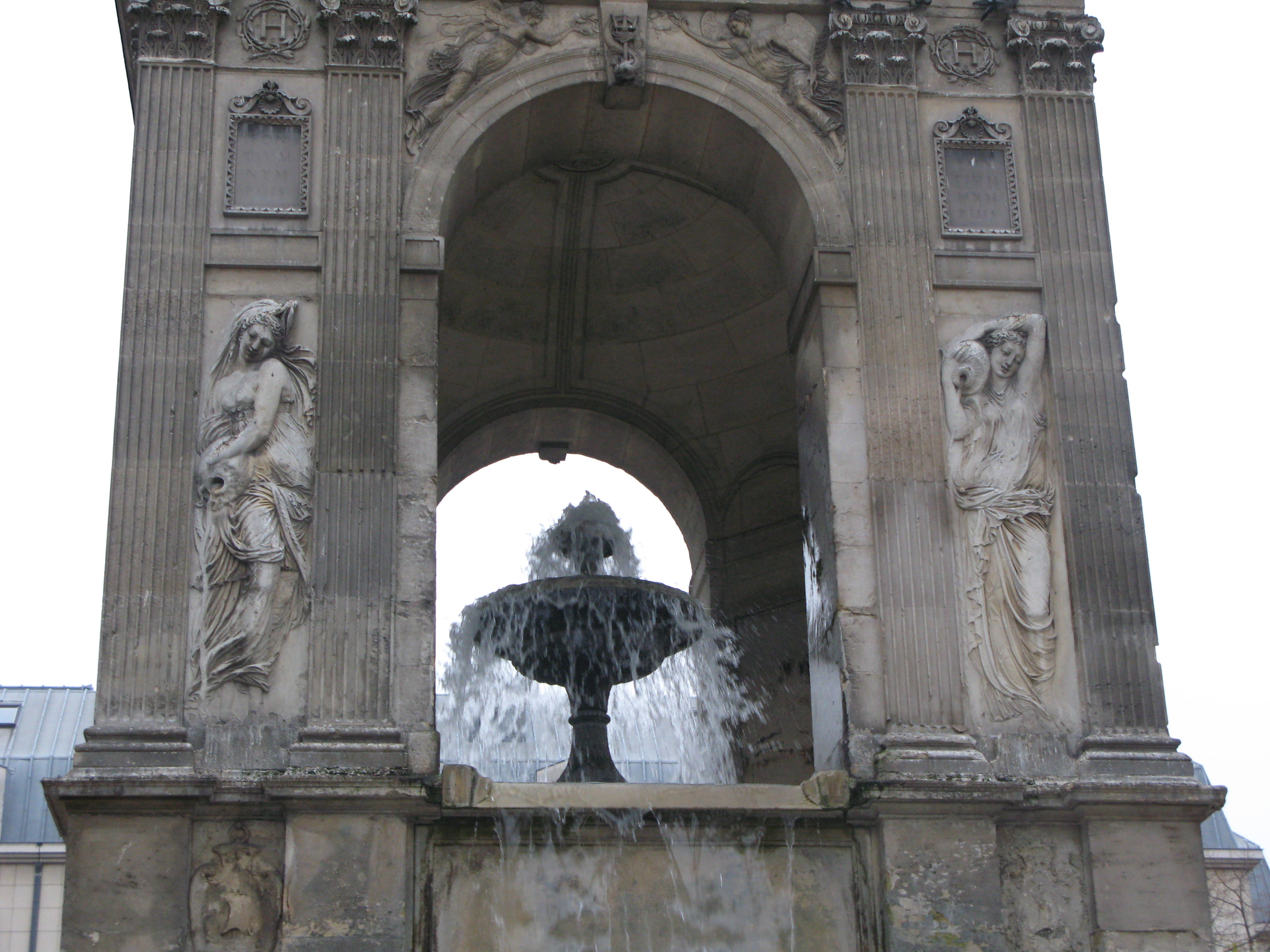
Fontaine des Innocents today (detail)

The Fontaine des Innocents is a monumental public fountain located on the place Joachim-du-Bellay in the Les Halles district in the 1st arrondissement of Paris, France. Originally called the Fountain of the Nymphs, it was constructed between 1547 and 1550 by architect Pierre Lescot and sculptor Jean Goujon in the new style of the French Renaissance. It is the oldest monumental fountain in Paris.

== History ==
The fountain was commissioned as part of the decoration of the city to commemorate the solemn royal entry of King Henry II into Paris in 1549. Artists were commissioned to construct elaborate monuments, mostly temporary, along his route, from the Port Saint-Denis to the Palais de la Cité, passing by le Châtelet, the Pont Notre-Dame and the Cathedral. The fountain was placed on the site of an earlier fountain dating to the reign of Philip II of France, against the wall of the Saints Innocents Cemetery, at the corner of rue Saint Denis (where the King's procession passed) and rue aux Fers (today's rue Berger), with two façades on one street, one façade on the other. It was to serve as a fountain as well as a grand reviewing stand for local notables; it resembled the walls of a large residence, with water taps along the street at the street level, and a stairway to the loggia on the upper level, where officials stood on the balcony to greet the King. Its original name was the Fountain of the Nymphs.

Once the procession had passed, the structure became a simple water fountain for the neighborhood, with taps, ornamented with lion heads, permanently trickling water. The upper floor of the fountain was eventually turned into a residence, with windows and a chimney.

In 1787, for sanitary reasons, the cemeteries of Paris were moved outside the city walls, and the former cemetery of the Church of the Saints-Innocents, against whose wall the fountain stood, was transformed into a market square, le Marché des Innocents. The fountain was scheduled for destruction. It was saved largely by the efforts of writer Quatremère de Quincy, who wrote a letter to the Journal de Paris urging the preservation of "A masterpiece of French sculpture." The fountain was moved to the middle of a large basin in the market, raised on a stone pedestal decorated with four lions and four basins. The sculptor Augustin Pajou was commissioned to create a fourth façade for the fountain, in the same style as the other three, so that it could be free-standing.

Because of the poor water supply system of Paris, the fountain produced only a small flow of water. Under Napoleon Bonaparte, a new aqueduct was constructed from the River Ourcq, and finally the fountain gushed water, in such abundance that it threatened the sculptural decoration. The smaller bas-reliefs at the base of the fountain were removed in 1810 and placed in the Musée du Louvre in 1824.

In 1858, during the Second French Empire of Louis Napoleon, the fountain was again moved, to its present location on a modest pedestal in the middle of the square; and six basins of pouring water, one above the other, were added on each façade.

== Architecture ==
Pierre Lescot (1510–1578), the architect of the fountain, was responsible for introducing classical models and French Renaissance architecture into Paris. Francis I named him chief architect of the Palais du Louvre, and over the following years he transformed the building from a medieval castle into a Renaissance palace. He worked with Jean Goujon on the decoration of two façades of the Cour Carrée of the Louvre.

The fountain's architecture was inspired by the nymphaeum of ancient Rome, a building or monument decorated with statuary of nymphs, tritons and other water deities, and usually used to protect a fountain or spring.

== Sculptural decoration ==
In 1547, Jean Goujon (1510–1572) became the court sculptor for Henry II, and this fountain was one of his first important commissions. In the same year he made illustrations for the French translation of the book of architecture by Vitruvius, a major classical source of the architecture of the Italian Renaissance and the French Renaissance. Later he worked again with Pierre Lescot on the bas-reliefs for the Cour Carrée of the Louvre Palace.

Though he was the court sculptor of Henry II, Goujon was a Protestant, and he fled to Italy during the French Wars of Religion, when Henry II began serious persecution of French Protestants.

Goujon was one of the first French sculptors to draw inspiration from the sculpture of ancient Rome, particularly the bas-relief sculptures on Roman sarcophagi. The nymph and triton on one of the fountain panels (see illustration) resembled a Roman sarcophagus in Grottaferrata, which was on display when Goujon was in Rome, and which had been the subject of several 16th-century artists. The Triton’s hair resembled that in an ancient statue of The River Tiber, which had been discovered in Rome in 1512.

Goujon’s work on the fountain was also inspired by the Italian artists who had come to work for Francis I at the Château de Fontainebleau, Rosso Fiorentino (1495-1540) and Francesco Primaticcio (1504-1570). The nymph and sea dragon on the fountain had the same pose as the nymph of Fontainebleau, by Rosso, in the Galerie François I of the chateau, and the female forms of the nymphs, with their elongated bodies, narrow shoulders, and small, high breasts, resembled the idealized female figures of Primaticcio.

Goujon’s personal contribution was a decorative swirling movement in the sculptures, with undulating drapery and curling scrolls made of sea shells and the tails of sea creatures.

== See also ==
- Fountains in Paris

== Bibliography ==
- Paris et ses fontaines, de la Renaissance à nos jours, texts assembled by Dominque Massounie, Pauline-Prevost-Marchilhacy and Daniel Rabreau, Délegation a l'action artistique de la Ville de Paris
- Jacques Hillairet and Pascal Payen-Appenzeller, Dictionnaire historique des rues de Paris, Éditions de minuit, Paris, 1985, (ISBN 2-707-310549)
- H. Sauval, Histoire et recherche des antiquités de la ville de Paris, Paris, 1724, t.1., p. 21
- G. Brice, Description nouvelle de ce qu'il y a de plus remarquable dans la Ville de Paris, Paris, 1725, 8th ed. p. 325
- J.-A. Piganiol de la Force, Description historique de la Ville de Paris et de ses environs, Paris, 1778, 6th edition, p. 325
- J.-C. Quatremère de Quincy, Encyclopédie méthodique, Paris, 1800, pp. 475–7
- David Gilks, ‘The Fountain of the Innocents and its place in the Paris cityscape’, Urban history (2018) 45: 49-73.
