= Casanova (novel) =

1998 novel by Andrew Miller

- First edition
- Author: Andrew Miller
- Language: English
- Genre: Fictional prose
- Publisher: Sceptre
- Publication date: 3 September 1998
- Publication place: England
- Media type: Print
- Pages: 279
- ISBN: 978-0-340-68209-8
- OCLC: 440896425
- Preceded by: Ingenious Pain (1997)
- Followed by: Oxygen (2001)

Casanova is the second novel by English author Andrew Miller, released on 3 September 1998 through Sceptre. The novel was relatively well received by reviewers and was shortlisted for an Encore Award in 1999.

== Plot ==
Set in 1763, the novel is centred around the historical figure of Giacomo Casanova and loosely follows his autobiographical Histoire de ma vie. The plot of the novel concerns Casanova falling for a woman and having, for the first time, to deal with rejection and the pain which it causes him.

== Reception ==
The novel was relatively well received, with reviewers praising Miller's prose and sense of place. Critics of the novel cited Miller's basic plot and lack of originality when compared with Casanova's own Histoire de ma vie.

The novel was well received by Stephanie Merritt of The Daily Telegraph, who stated that "Miller has drawn an exquisite and convincing picture of 18th-century London" and complemented the novel's "elegant prose", "luxurious imagery" and "wry humour". It was also relatively well reviewed by an author in The Independent, who stated that "The only problem posed for the reader is whether to dwell on the sumptuous pleasures of Miller's intricate prose or to race along with the farcical complications of his plot.". The novel was well received by The New York Times, with reviewer Lorna Sage stating "Miller's Casanova, ingeniously translated to our own fin de siècle, is a New Age narcissist -- so observant, so chastened, that self-love can save him after all."; and, while commenting on the implausibility of the novels premise, stating "that's precisely the confidence trick Miller is so good at, conjuring the phrases that get sensation onto the page, keeping you in obsessive, close-up focus". The novel was praised in the Seattle Times also, with reviewer Michael Upchurch praising the novels "extravagant humor" and "wealth of period detail", while stating "Miller, born in 1961, seems a mite too young to have passed this particular threshold of experience himself. But he sure gets it painfully and hilariously right.".

The novel did not, however, receive universal acclaim. Elspeth Barker, also reviewing for The Independent, stated "this is a disappointing and unsatisfying book", calling Casanova himself a "two-dimensional creature, too shallow and self-absorbed to engage sympathy" and mentioning that "his actions and the actions of those around him often seem merely arbitrary" and stating "some of the prose is oddly awkward and laboured". She does, however, temper this by stating "despite its flaws, at its best it confirms the unshakeable certainty which possesses anyone who has read Miller's marvellous Ingenious Pain: that here is a writer of very rare and outstanding gifts, no matter what.". In a review by Michael Arditti, again for The Independent, Arditti states "Casanova is a deeply disappointing second novel from the author of Ingenious Pain. There is no sense of personal impetus behind the writing, which offers a rehash of well-known images and themes." and criticises the "basic plot", simple characters and lack of originality. He further states of Miller that he "hope[s] he gives more scope to his own proven powers of imagination in his next book.".
