= Oxygen (Miller novel) =

2001 novel by Andrew Miller

- Author: Andrew Miller
- Language: English
- Genre: Fictional prose
- Publisher: Sceptre
- Publication date: 6 September 2001
- Publication place: England
- Media type: Print
- Pages: 323
- ISBN: 978-0-340-72825-3
- OCLC: 48362915
- Preceded by: Casanova (1999)
- Followed by: The Optimists (2005)

Oxygen is the third novel by English author, Andrew Miller, released on 6 September 2001 through Sceptre. Although the novel received mixed reviews, it was shortlisted for both a Man Booker Prize and a Whitbread Award in 2001.

== Plot ==
Set in San Fernando Valley and Hungary in 1997, the story revolves around a late-stage cancer patient, Alice; her two markedly different sons, one a translator, the other a soap star; and a seemingly unconnected Hungarian playwright named László Lázár. The plot centres on the family's troubles and the sons coming to terms with the fact that their mother will likely not see another birthday.

== Reception ==
Alfred Hickling, writing for The Guardian, praised Miller's "piteous and poetic" evocation of the subject of Alice's cancer and stated: "Most fiction catalogues its characters' achievements; Miller lingers remorselessly on their failures. It's a bleak world, but one invested with a peculiar beauty." In a review for the New York Times, author Margot Livesey praised Miller's disparate storytelling, stating "only a writer of verve and talent would be able to pull off the creation of such varied milieus, and happily, Miller is such a writer." Livesey also praised the ending of the novel, stating that "although Miller's methods may lead to a certain diminution of emotional impact, the ending of his novel more than rewards the attentive reader." The novel was well received by Publishers Weekly, with the reviewer praising Miller's "elegant, resonant prose" and "brilliant dexterity" with respect to his intertwined plot-lines, and stating that "this book breathes with compassion and honesty, and with the rare quality called hope".

The novel received mixed reviews from the Daily Telegraph and the Seattle Times. For the Seattle Times, reviewer Scott Stolnack found the novel "richly imagined" and praised the novel's depth and the strength of the individual characters, but did not feel it was "of the caliber of his previous works", stating "while certain scenes are rendered beautifully and lucidly, nothing here compares to the startling vividness of his two earlier novels". These views were coupled in the Telegraph, with the reviewer praising Miller's "stylistic polish", "considerable flair for characterisation" and "superbly realised" three-dimensional characters. The reviewer, however, also found that the "narrative meanders" somewhat and states that the novel as a whole "does not quite cohere, but there is fine writing on every page".

Reviewing for the New Statesman, Hugo Barnacle was more critical of the novel, finding the prose "self-consciously literary" and commenting that it "doesn't quite pay its way". Barnacle also found the story lacking, stating, "The plotting would never pass muster at a crime writers' convention. For some reason, posh-prose writers can be very slack on that score. Miller introduces a loaded gun and a deadly poison capsule on the feeblest of pretexts." He ended his review with the opinion that "Miller will have to ditch a few pretensions if he wants to be good". The novel was also not well received by Darren Waters of the BBC. Waters found the plot to be "disappointingly straightforward", the language to be "terse, almost perfunctory" and the female characters to be "drawn with pencil". He further stated: "The book's themes have the transparency of oxygen, as the title suggests, but they never crystallize into anything remotely interesting."
