= Place Joachim-du-Bellay =

Square in Paris, France

Coordinates: 48.86062°N 2.34801°E

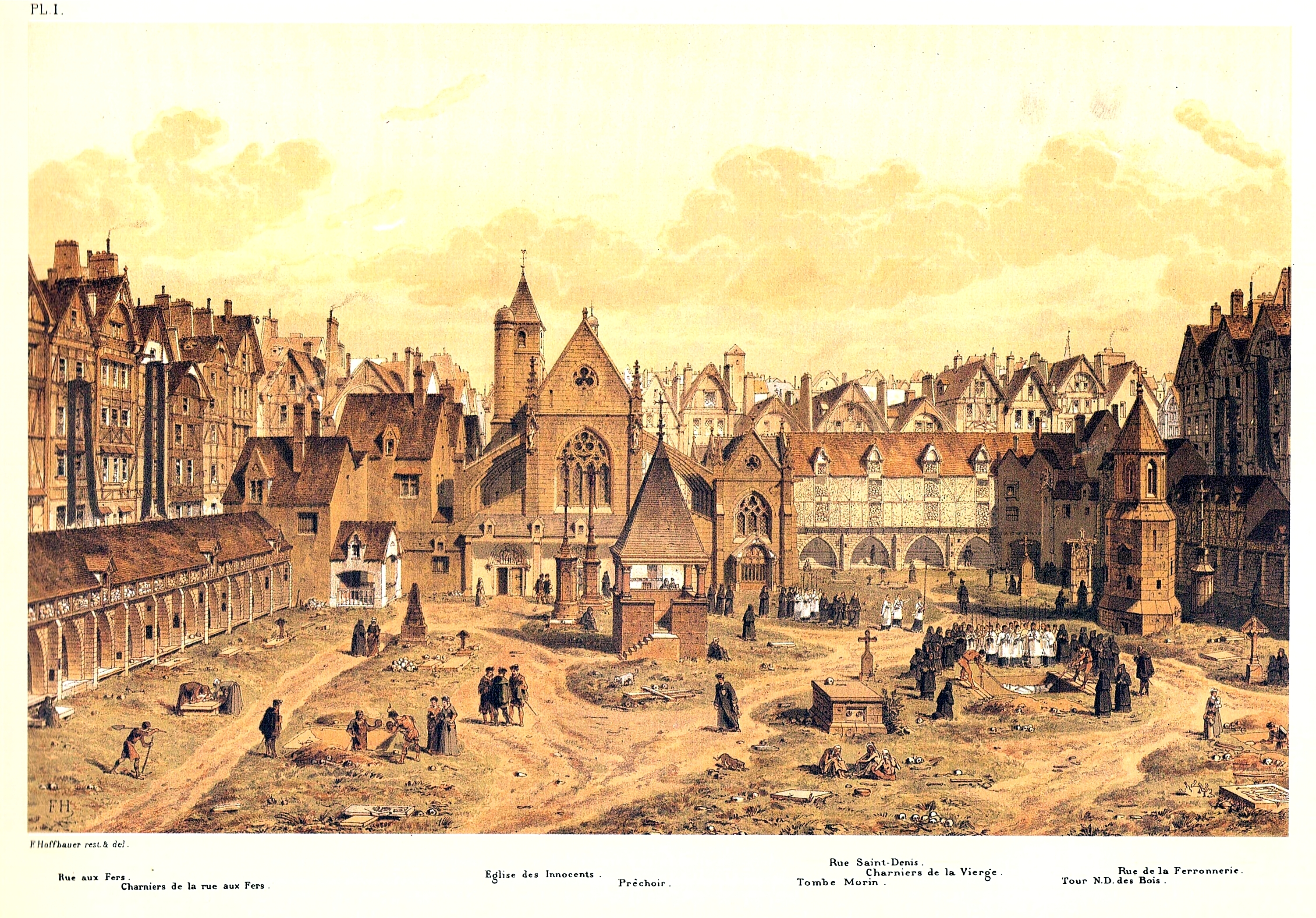
The Holy Innocents' Cemetery, c. 1550. The Church of the Holy Innocents, bordering the Rue Saint-Denis, is in the background.

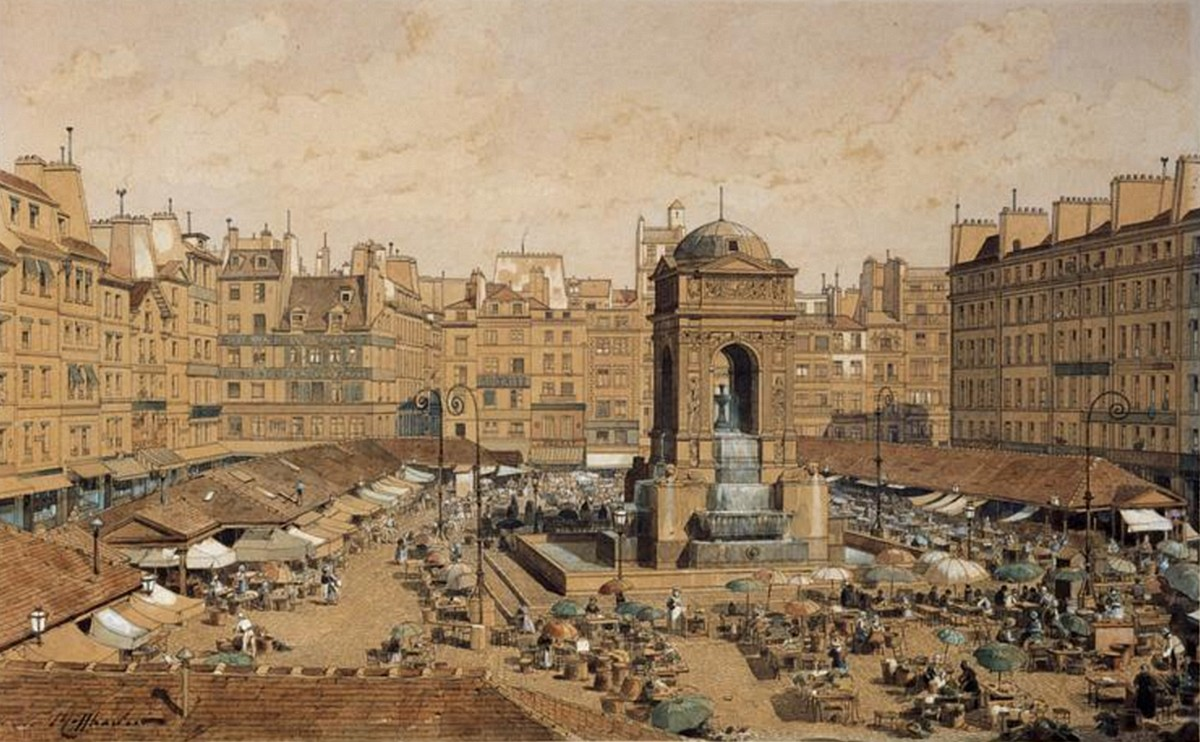
The square with the Fountain of Innocents, 1850

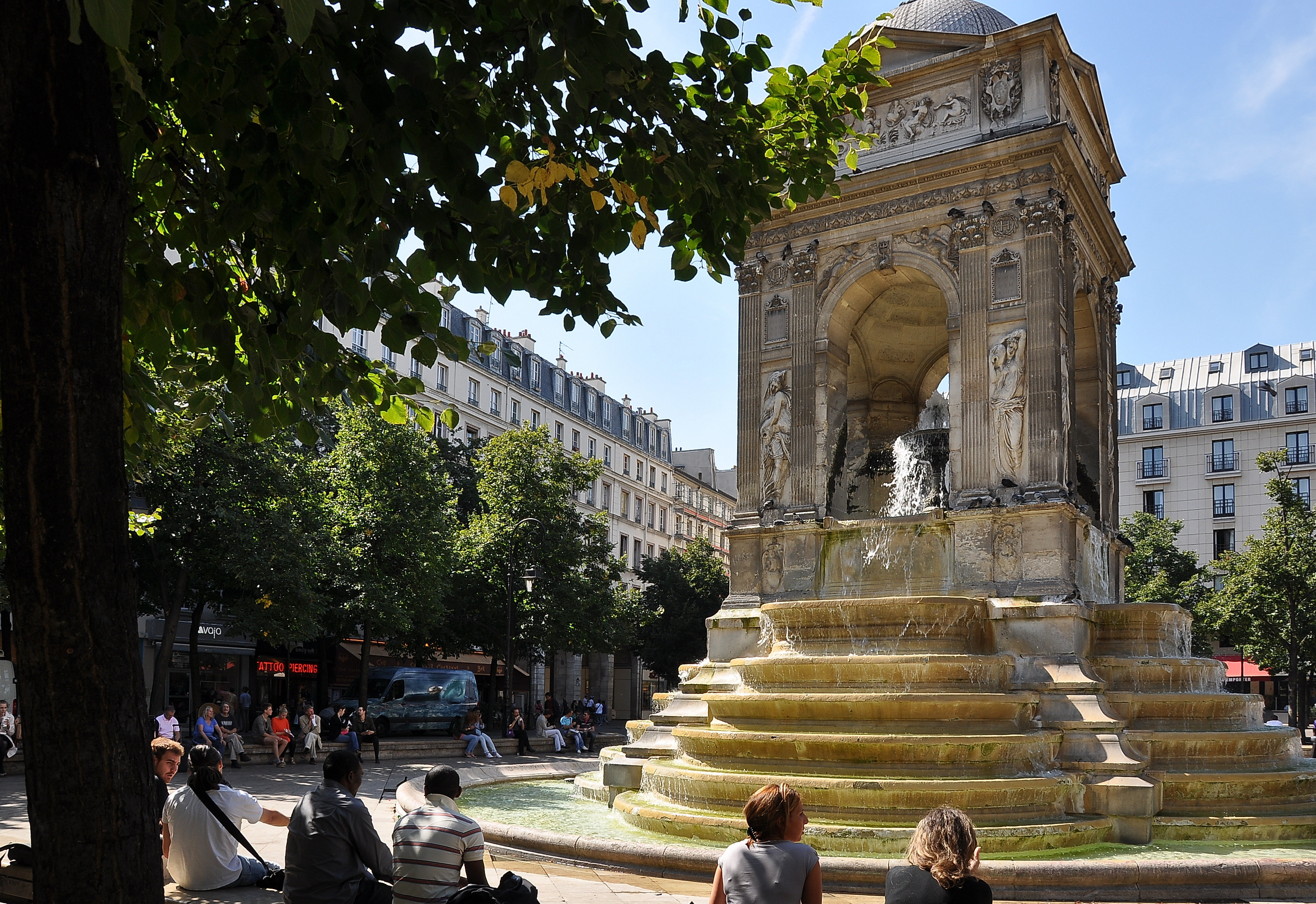
The Fountain of Innocents

The Place Joachim-du-Bellay is a square in the 1st arrondissement of Paris, France, near Les Halles and the Pompidou Center. It is named after Joachim du Bellay, a French poet and literary critic (1522–1560).

The square was built in 1787 on the location of the previous Holy Innocents' Cemetery, after the cemetery's demolition. The Fountain of Innocents now resides in the center of the square, marking the cemetery's last remnant.

== History of location ==
While the history of the location on which the Place Joachim-du-Bellay resides is long and rich, this history of the square itself is rather simple.

The previous structure was that of the Holy Innocents Cemetery, which operated, along with the Church of the Holy Innocents, from the 9th century to 1780 (during the Ancien Régime in France), when it was closed due to overuse.

The Holy Innocents Cemetery is notable because it held the first documented mural of Danse Macabre, a style of painting during late-medieval times emphasizing the impact of death on lives and all ages. This mural was destroyed, however, almost 200 years after its construction, in 1669.

At the edge of the cemetery there was a fountain, originally named the Fountain of the Nymphs and now known as the Fountain of the Innocents (French: Fontaine des Innocents). This fountain was dismantled in 1787 when the grounds of the church and cemetery were finally torn down and replaced by a stone laid square, the Place Joachim-du-Bellay. The square was originally a herb and vegetable market and was also known as the Marché des Innocents.

The Fountain of the Innocents was re-assembled soon after the completion of said square and erected in its center, where it now stands. The Fountain of Innocents is the oldest monumental fountain in Paris.

== Sources ==
- Fontaine des Innocents – aviewoncities.com
