= Ingenious Pain =

1997 novel by Andrew Miller

- First edition
- Author: Andrew Miller
- Language: English
- Genre: Bildungsroman
- Publisher: Sceptre
- Publication date: 20 February 1997
- Publication place: England
- Media type: Print
- Pages: 337
- ISBN: 978-0-340-68207-4
- OCLC: 154247990
- Followed by: Casanova (1998)

Ingenious Pain is the first novel by English author Andrew Miller, published in 1997. Set in the mid-18th century, the novel follows the picaresque adventures of James Dyer, an Englishman born without the ability to feel pain or pleasure. It won the James Tait Black Memorial Prize for Fiction, the International Dublin Literary Award, and the Italian Premio Grinzane Cavour prize for a foreign language novel. The novel was also listed by The New York Times as a "Notable Books of the Year" for 1997.

== Plot ==
The novel opens in 1771 with the autopsy of James Dyer by two gentleman surgeons keen on understanding the deceased's famed inability to feel physical pain. The pair had been given access to the corpse by the Reverend Lestrade, a hunting enthusiast and vicar to a country parish.

The story then rewinds to the night of James's conception on a midwinter night in 1739, when his mother is raped by a stranger while skating at night. She gives birth to an infant whose failure to cry is unsettling to all present. Against all expectations the baby lives, growing up to be a mute boy with an inordinately precocious countenance that disconcerts everyone, foremost of all his schoolteacher, a crippled spinster who prides herself on being an expert on children.

James is discovered to be incapable of feeling pain following a fall from the top of a tree. Shortly after, he surprises everyone by speaking. While recuperating from the fall, an outbreak of smallpox kills his mother and two siblings, leaving him alone with his older sister Liza, the only person who has any affection for him, and his mother's distraught husband, Joshua, an impoverished yeoman. Already something of a habitual drunkard, Joshua gives himself completely to alcoholism in his grief, ultimately killing himself.

James immediately departs for Bristol, leaving Liza, who has been rendered blind by smallpox, to an undetermined fate. James searches out Marley Gummer, a veteran conman and huckster who had been among the men to rescue James from his fall and the first to note James's unusual nature.

Gummer takes the young boy under his wing, training him to mimic pain and suffering. Once James has perfected his screams, they set out to tour the country fair circuit in England, peddling a quack nostrum touted as capable of warding off pain. It is at one of these acts that James catches the attention of a gentleman by the name of Canning, a collector of freaks and patron of artists. James understands Canning's overtures and willingly acquiesces to being kidnapped away from Gummer, who is beaten up by men in the employ of Canning.

James finds himself being housed on a vast country estate, where he is largely left to his own devices. At night he wanders the seemingly endless corridors of Canning's manor house, encountering a librarian, a painter, and a pair of Siamese twins. His newfound acquaintances all provide something to James: through the librarian, he is given access to a near-inexhaustible supply of anatomy books, from the painter the ability to finetune drawing (a skill he had picked up in his earlier childhood), and from the twins his first experience of sexual intercourse.

Canning is revealed to be a member of the Royal Society and an enthusiast of science. He takes James to London where the boy is subjected to experimentation in front of an audience of Canning's peers, who are all wowed by James's indifference to stabbings. Meanwhile, the Siamese twins die as a result of an awry attempt to surgically separate them; James is the only one unmoved by the blood-splattered carnage that accompanies the event.

Gummer reappears and kidnaps James at gunpoint. This is shortly after James has discovered that Canning is a hermaphrodite. The reunited duo return to Bristol, where Gummer immediately embarks on a drinking spree to celebrate the boy's return. Any hopes of a return to the days of Gummer's successful quackery are put to an immediate end, however, when James allows for the two of them to be pressganged into the royal navy.

On board the ship, James develops a reputation for efficiency and fearlessness. These qualities enable him to become assistant to naval surgeon Robert Munro. James discreetly engineers Munro's ouster by enabling his drinking. James is appointed Munro's replacement and distinguishes himself in action against the French during the battle for Minorca.

James eventually departs naval service to become a medical student, accompanied by Gummer, who by now has become his manservant. His studies over, he searches out Munro, who has settled in Bath with a young pretty wife. James moves in with the married couple and proceeds to establish their medical practice as the most sought in the city. The surgeons' wealth expands in accordance with their increasing popularity among the aristocracy. This period of prosperity proves fleeting, however, because Munro's wife Agnes soon falls for James. The extramarital affair drives Munro to suicide, which in turn causes both Agnes and James to be ostracised.

With his practice snubbed and his clinic falling prey to vandalism by the city's outraged denizens, James opts to participate in a race among other English doctors to inoculate Empress Catherine of Russia. Against the odds, he fails to win the race, having been waylaid by a snowstorm and abandoned by Gummer. James falls into a stupor and loses his sanity. James is subsequently shipped back from Saint Petersburg and incarcerated in Bedlam, where he is subjected to many beatings. It is during this time that he discovers sensation, feeling both pain and pleasure.

== Reception ==
Critics praised Miller's evocative prose, thorough research and precise pacing.

Sarah Broadhurst in a review for Love Reading stated that the book was a "very skilful, densely written, complicated novel" and stated that it was "challenging and intelligent, it is a rewarding read." Publishers Weekly called the novel "inventive", "steeped with specific details" and "beautifully controlled". In a review for The Independent, Josie Barnard praised the tone of the novel, stating "Ambivalence is one of Miller's strengths. He enfolds the reader in the present tense and wields his writing style as coolly and precisely as a scalpel." and also praised his descriptions of the 18th century, stating that "Miller's evocation of the period is thorough. Many of his sentences speak paragraphs, his paragraph pages. Ingenious Pain is a book that gives visceral pleasure.", calling the novel as a whole "sensational". It was again reviewed by The Independent a year later by Lilian Pizzichini who opined that Miller's "understanding of contemporary mores is thorough, the period detail precisely evoked, and his characters come alive with flashes of humour and compassion."

Patrick McGrath writing for The New York Times was particularly effusive in his praise, calling the novel "peculiar", "colorful" and "complicated"; an "extraordinary first novel". He also praises Miller's research, writing that "he writes a fine strong prose thickly larded with the sights, sounds, and smells of the period". He also praises the pacing of the novel; and draws comparison to John Fowles' novel The French Lieutenant's Woman; Graham Swift's Waterland; and Peter Ackroyd's "early flamboyant historical pastiches".

== See also ==
- Congenital insensitivity to pain
