= Matthew Hollis =

English author, editor, professor, and poet (born 1971)

- Born: 1971 (age 54–55); Norwich, England
- Education: University of Edinburgh; University of York
- Occupations: Author; editor; professor; poet
- Parent(s): Patricia Hollis and Martin Hollis
- Writing career
- Notable work: Now All Roads Lead to France (2011)

Matthew Hollis (born 1971) is an English author, editor, professor, and poet, currently living in London, England.

== Career and background ==
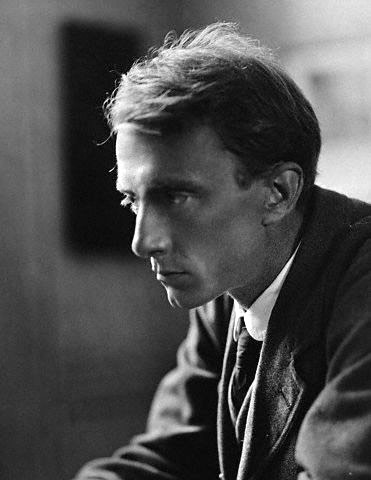
The late Edward Thomas, for whom Hollis has been a biographer and editor, and received inspiration from

He was born in Norwich, England, the son of politician Patricia Hollis and academic Martin Hollis. He has studied at the universities of Edinburgh and York. He presently lives in London, England, writing as well as serving as a tutor for the London Poetry School. He joined Faber and Faber in 2002, helping devise the Faber New Poets series. He became the publisher's poetry editor in 2012 and retired from the role in 2023. He is a member of the international educational and cultural enhancement organisation the British Council, taking part in the Arts Council's "First Lines" programme in 2001.

Hollis has published a variety of written works. After its shortlisting for the Forward Prize for Best First Collection, his first full-length collection Ground Water (Bloodaxe Books, 2004) was shortlisted for the Guardian First Book Award (the first time for a poetry book) and for the Whitbread Poetry Award; Ground Water was also a Poetry Book Society Recommendation.

Hollis is perhaps best known for the 2011 non-fiction book Now All Roads Lead to France, a critically acclaimed (praise appearing in The Guardian, The Independent, The Wall Street Journal, and others) biography of seminal English poet Edward Thomas. The work won the 2011 H. W. Fisher Best First Biography Prize, as well as the 2011 Costa Book Award for "Best Biography". The judges for the latter commented: "Dramatic and engrossing. A brilliant biography that moved us all."

Hollis's most recent work is Waste Land: A Biography of a Poem, published on 13 October 2022 by Faber and Faber, which was made book of the year by the Sunday Times, the New Statesman and the Financial Times.

== See also ==
- Now All Roads Lead to France
- Patricia Hollis, Baroness Hollis of Heigham
- List of poets
