= Andrew Miller (novelist) =

British novelist (born 1960)

Andrew Miller FRSL
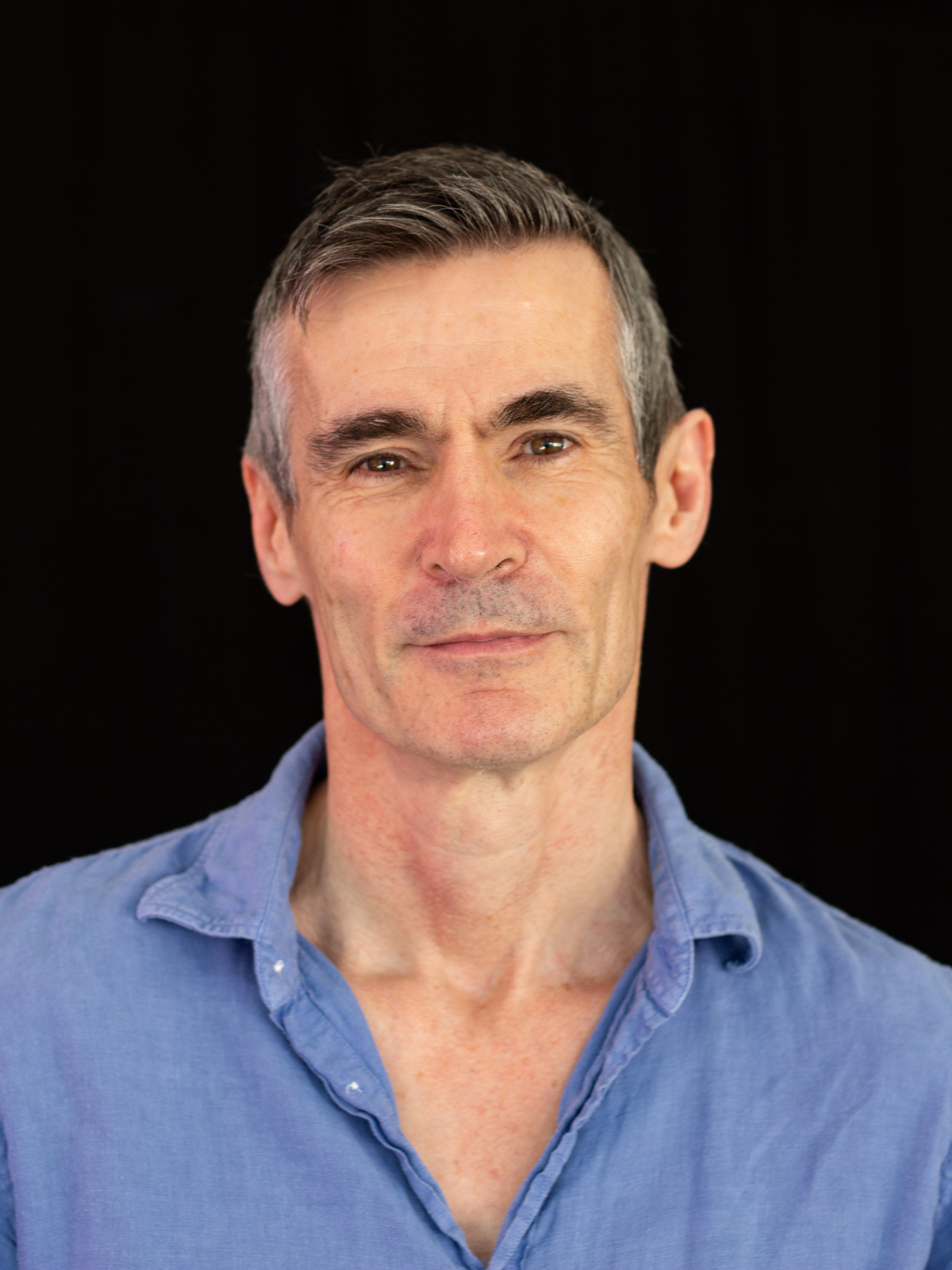
- Miller at Perth Festival Writers Week in 2019
- Born: 29 April 1960 (age 66); Bristol, England, UK
- Education: Critical and Creative Writing
- Alma mater: Middlesex University; University of East Anglia; Lancaster University
- Occupation: Author
- Writing career
- Language: English
- Genre: Fictional prose
- Notable works: Ingenious Pain (1997); Oxygen (2001); Pure (2011); Now We Shall Be Entirely Free (2018); The Land in Winter (2024)
- Notable awards: James Tait Black Memorial Prize; IMPAC (1999); Costa Book Award (2011)

Andrew Brooke Miller (born 29 April 1960) is an English novelist. He has published ten novels and has won the James Tait Black Memorial Prize, the International Dublin Literary Award, the Costa Book Awards Book of the Year, the Winston Graham Historical Prize and the Walter Scott Prize. He has been shortlisted for the Booker Prize.

== Life and career ==
Miller was born in Bristol, England. He grew up in the West Country and has lived in Spain, Japan, Ireland and France. He was educated at Dauntsey's School, and after gaining a first-class degree in English at Middlesex Polytechnic, completed an MA in Creative Writing at the University of East Anglia in 1991. In 1995, he wrote a PhD in critical and creative writing at Lancaster University.

For his 1997 first novel, Ingenious Pain, Miller received three awards: the James Tait Black Memorial Award for Fiction, the International Dublin Literary Award, and the Grinzane Cavour Prize in Italy. The book has been translated into 36 languages.

Miller currently lives in Witham Friary in Somerset with his daughter Frieda.

== Bibliography ==
- Ingenious Pain (1997, Sceptre)
- Casanova (1998, Sceptre)
- Oxygen (2001, Sceptre)
- The Optimists (2005, Sceptre)
- One Morning Like a Bird (2008, Sceptre)
- Pure (2011, Sceptre)
- The Crossing (2015, Sceptre)
- Now We Shall Be Entirely Free (2018, Sceptre)
- The Slowworm's Song (2022, Sceptre)
- The Land in Winter (2024, Sceptre)

== Awards ==
- 1997: James Tait Black Memorial Prize, Fiction Award, Ingenious Pain
- 1997: Premio Grinzane Cavour (Italy), Best Foreign Fiction, Ingenious Pain
- 1999: International Dublin Literary Award, winner, Ingenious Pain
- 2001: Booker Prize, shortlist, Oxygen
- 2001: Whitbread Novel Award, shortlist, Oxygen
- 2011: Costa Book Awards, Best Novel, Pure
- 2011: Costa Book Awards, Costa Book of the Year, Pure
- 2012: Walter Scott Prize, shortlist, Pure
- 2012: Elected Fellow of the Royal Society of Literature
- 2013: International Dublin Literary Award, shortlist, Pure
- 2018: Highland Book Prize, winner, Now We Shall Be Entirely Free
- 2019: Walter Scott Prize, shortlist, Now We Shall Be Entirely Free
- 2025: Winston Graham Historical Prize, winner, The Land in Winter
- 2025: Walter Scott Prize, winner, The Land in Winter
- 2025: Booker Prize, shortlist, The Land in Winter
