= Sceptre (imprint) =

Imprint of Hodder & Stoughton

- Parent company: Hodder & Stoughton
- Founded: 1986
- Country of origin: United Kingdom
- Headquarters location: London, England
- Nonfiction topics: Various
- Fiction genres: Literary fiction
- Official website: Sceptre Books

Sceptre is an imprint of Hodder & Stoughton, a British publishing house that is a division of Hachette UK.

Founded in 1986 as the literary imprint of Hodder & Stoughton, Sceptre’s remit is to publish original fiction and non-fiction that aims not just to entertain and absorb but also to stretch the mind: to be thought-provoking, stimulating, surprising and enlightening.

== Notable publications ==
- David Mitchell

- Cloud Atlas (2004) - winner of the British Book Awards Literary Fiction Award, Richard & Judy Book of the Year Award; shortlisted for the 2004 Booker Prize, Nebula Award, and Arthur C. Clarke Award. Adapted into a 2012 film of the same name, starring Tom Hanks and Halle Berry.
- The Thousand Autumns of Jacob de Zoet (2010) - winner of the 2011 Commonwealth Writers' Prize regional prize, longlisted for the Booker Prize, shortlisted for the 2011 Walter Scott Prize.

- Thomas Keneally

- Schindler's Ark (1982) - winner of the Booker Prize, adapted into the film Schindler's List, directed by Steven Spielberg
- The Widow and Her Hero (2007) - shortlisted for the Miles Franklin Award and for the Prime Minister's Literary Award
- The Daughters of Mars (2012) - winner of the Colin Roderick Award

- Andrew Miller

- Ingenious Pain (1997)
- Oxygen (2001) - shortlisted for the Booker Prize and for the Whitbread Novel Award
- Pure (2011) - winner of the Costa Prize
- The Land in Winter (2024) - winner of the Walter Scott Prize; shortlisted for the 2025 Booker Prize

- Chris Cleave

- The Other Hand (2008) - shortlisted for the 2008 Costa Book Award
- Gold (2012)

- Jenn Ashworth
- Siri Hustvedt
- Ned Beauman

- Boxer, Beetle (2010) - shortlisted for the Guardian First Book Award 2010

- Polly Atkin

- Some of Us Just Fall: On nature and not getting better (2023) - winner of the Lakeland Book of the Year 2024
